= List of Farm to Market Roads in Texas (400–499) =

- Texas Farm to Market Road and Ranch to Market Road markers

Highway names
- Interstates: Interstate Highway X (IH-X, I-X)
- US Highways: U.S. Highway X (US X)
- State: State Highway X (SH X)
- Loops: Loop X
- Spurs: Spur X
- Recreational: Recreational Road X (RE X)
- Farm or Ranch to Market Roads: Farm to Market Road X (FM X); Ranch to Market Road X (RM X)
- Park Roads: Park Road X (PR X)

System links
- Highways in Texas; Interstate; US; State; Former; Toll; Loops; Spurs; FM/RM; Park; Rec

Farm to Market Roads in Texas are owned and maintained by the Texas Department of Transportation (TxDOT).

== FM 400 ==
Farm to Market Road 400
- Location: Lynn, Lubbock, Hale, and Swisher counties
- Length: 85.417 mi (137.465 km)
- Existed: June 25, 1945–present

Farm to Market Road 400 (FM 400) runs for 85 miles (137 km), around the east side of Lubbock, from an interchange with US 87 near Tahoka to FM 145 near Kress.

== FM 401 ==
Farm to Market Road 401
- Location: Childress County
- Length: 1.159 mi (1.865 km)
- Existed: November 26, 1969–present

Farm to Market Road 401 (FM 401) is located in Childress County. Its southern terminus is at US 287 (Avenue F) and 7th Street in downtown Childress. It runs north along 7th Street for 1.2 miles (1.9 km) to a T-intersection with FM 3181 north of the city.

FM 401 was designated on November 26, 1969, along the current route.

=== FM 401 (1945–1964) ===
Farm to Market Road 401
- Location: Lubbock and Hale counties
- Existed: June 25, 1945–August 20, 1964

A previous route numbered FM 401 was designated in Lubbock County on June 25, 1945, from US 84, 2 miles (3.2 km) northwest of Shallowater, to the Hale County line. On July 9 of that year, it was extended north into Hale County to FM 54. FM 401 was cancelled on August 20, 1964, and its mileage was transferred to FM 179.

=== FM 401 (1968) ===
Farm to Market Road 401
- Location: Angelina County
- Existed: July 11, 1968–October 1968

Another route numbered FM 401 was proposed in Angelina County on July 11, 1968, to run from US 59 0.8 miles (1.3 km) south of Loop 287 in Lufkin southwest 0.7 miles (1.1 km). This route was cancelled 90 days later, as Angelina County and/or the city of Lufkin did not accept the minute order by that time.

== FM 402 ==
Farm to Market Road 402
- Location: Terry County
- Length: 16.265 mi (26.176 km)
- Existed: June 25, 1945–present

Farm to Market Road 402 (FM 402) is a 16.3-mile-long (26.2 km) route in Terry County. The highway begins at an intersection with FM 213 and County Road 856 about one and a half miles (2.4 km) west of the city of Wellman. FM 402 heads north with two slight S curves to the west before intersecting US 82/US 380 ten miles (16 km) west of Brownfield. The highway reaches the settlement of Johnson before curving to the east at FM 3262 and then curving back to the north to reach its terminus at FM 303.

The highway was created on June 25, 1945, running from what was then US 62 and US 380 to the community of Johnson for a length of three miles (4.8 km). On December 16, 1948, the road was extended south to a point west of Wellman which is now the road's current southern terminus. On December 17, 1952, the road was extended north past Johnson to a point along what was then FM 300 (now FM 211) bringing the length of the road to 22.3 miles (35.9 km). However, on February 24, 1953, FM 300 would take over the northernmost six miles (9.7 km) of FM 402 leading to the configuration that FM 402 follows today. This section of FM 300 was renumbered FM 303 on February 10, 1966.

== FM 403 ==
Farm to Market Road 403
- Location: Gaines and Terry counties
- Length: 17.136 mi (27.578 km)
- Existed: June 25, 1945–present

Farm to Market Road 403 (FM 403) is located in Gaines and Terry counties in western Texas. The 17.2-mile (27.7 km) highway begins at an intersection with SH 83 and County Road 664 in northeastern Gaines County and travels north through the county for three miles (4.8 km) before making an S curve to the west where it enters Terry County. The highway makes another S curve to the west before intersecting FM 213 and passing through the community of Foster before ending on the city limit line of Brownfield at an intersection with US 62/US 385 and SH 137.

On June 25, 1945, the highway was designated from its current northern terminus south to Foster for a length of seven miles (11 km). The road was extended south to the Gaines–Terry county line on July 20, 1948, and to its current southern terminus on June 21, 1951.

Junction list

County	Location	mi	km	Destinations	Notes
Gaines		0.0	0.0	SH 83 – Seagraves, Welch	
Terry		7.6	12.2	FM 213	
Terry	Brownfield	17.1	27.5	US 62 / US 385 / SH 137	
1.000 mi = 1.609 km; 1.000 km = 0.621 mi

== FM 404 ==
Farm to Market Road 404
- Location: Victoria and Calhoun counties
- Existed: June 12, 1945–August 29, 1990

Farm to Market Road 404 (FM 404) existed from 1945 to 1990 in southeastern Texas. The southern terminus of the road had always been in Green Lake at SH 35. From the time of its designation on June 12, 1945, until July 9 of the same year, its northern terminus was at the Calhoun–Victoria county line (with the road being entirely in Calhoun County). On July 9, the road was extended north through Bloomington and Pleasant Valley to the city of Victoria at US 87. On October 16, 1951, FM 404 began being signed (but not designated) as an extension of SH 185. On August 29, 1990, the entire route was officially designated as SH 185, and FM 404 was cancelled.

== FM 405 ==
Farm to Market Road 405
- Location: Walker County
- Length: 8.507 mi (13.691 km)
- Existed: June 11, 1945–present

Farm to Market Road 405 (FM 405) is a 8.5-mile-long (13.7 km) route in Walker County. The road's southern terminus is at US 190 near the community of Dodge and within the confines of the Sam Houston National Forest. The route heads north through unincorporated lands (mostly pine forests) before ending in the city of Riverside at SH 19. It was created on June 11, 1945.

== FM 406 ==
Farm to Market Road 406
- Location: Grayson County
- Length: 3.878 mi (6.241 km)
- Existed: October 26, 1983–present

Farm to Market Road 406 (FM 406) is a 3.9-mile-long (6.3 km) route running from SH 289 in the community of Fink to FM 84 in northern Grayson County, just south of Lake Texoma and the Oklahoma state line. The designation was assigned on October 26, 1983, between FM 120 in Fink to FM 84, similar to how it runs today (but at a total length of 4.0 miles (6.4 km)).

=== FM 406 (1945–1962) ===
Farm to Market Road 406
- Location: Orange County
- Existed: June 11, 1945–May 1, 1962

The first FM 406 existed from 1945 until 1962. It was a north–south road located in Orange County west of Orange. At the time of its designation on June 11, 1945, it traveled from SH 87 to the community of Peveto. On October 29, 1953, the road was extended northeastward by 1.3 miles (2.1 km) bringing the total length of the highway to 7.5 miles (12.1 km). This extension was formerly FM 1137. On September 29, 1954, the road was extended northeast to FM 1130. On April 27, 1955, the highway from Peveto to FM 1130 was redesignated as FM 1078, as the section from US 90 to Peveto was redesignated as part of rerouted SH 62 (which had its old route on Womack Road given to the county). The entire route was deleted on May 1, 1962, when it was replaced by SH 62.

== FM 407 ==
Farm to Market Road 407
- Location: Wise and Denton counties
- Length: 29.792 mi (47.946 km)
- Existed: May 23, 1951–present

Farm to Market Road 407 (FM 407) is located in Wise and Denton counties. It runs from US 81/US 287 in New Fairview to I-35E/US 77 in Lewisville. There is a brief concurrency with FM 156.

=== FM 407 (1945) ===
Farm to Market Road 407
- Location: Orange County
- Existed: June 11, 1945–December 10, 1946

A previous route numbered FM 407 was designated on June 11, 1945, from Orange north 2.3 miles (3.7 km). FM 407 was cancelled on December 10, 1946, as it became part of rerouted SH 87. The old route of SH 87 became FM 1559 upon completion, but this was transferred to FM 1130 in 1950, and removed from the state highway system on June 27, 1962.

== FM 408 ==
Farm to Market Road 408
- Location: Orange County
- Length: 3.166 mi (5.095 km)
- Existed: June 11, 1945–present

Farm to Market Road 408 (FM 408) is a 3.2-mile-long (5.1 km) route in Orange County, connecting Bridge City at FM 1442 (Roundbunch Road) to Orangefield at FM 105 (Orangefield Road). The highway begins at its south end along Miller Drive and travels due north. After exiting the city limits, the road makes a reverse curve to the west and resumes traveling north. It travels through the center of Orangefield before it ends at FM 105 which is within the city limits of Orange.

FM 408 was designated on June 11, 1945, from SH 87 (now SH 73, SH 87, and Texas Avenue) in Bridge City, west along Roundbunch Road, and then along its current routing to Orangefield, ending just south of its current terminus. In the 1940s, the route was proposed to be signed as a state highway, but was redesignated back to an FM route. It was extended north on January 12, 1966, due to the relocation of FM 105, and truncated to its current southern terminus on September 13, 1987, with FM 1442 replacing the deleted section.

== FM 409 ==
Farm to Market Road 409
- Location: Fannin County
- Length: 7.785 mi (12.529 km)
- Existed: March 16, 1982–present

Farm to Market Road 409 (FM 409) is a designation that has been used four times. The current use is in Fannin County, from FM 2029, one and a half miles (2.4 km) south of Telephone, to FM 100.

FM 409 was designated on March 16, 1982, from FM 2029 to Bois D'Arc Creek. It was extended to FM 100 on September 22, 1982.

=== FM 409 (1945–1953) ===
Farm to Market Road 409
- Location: Orange County
- Existed: June 11, 1945–January 29, 1953

The first use of the FM 409 designation was in Orange County, from SH 87 west to FM 408 at Orangefield. FM 409 was cancelled on January 29, 1953, and transferred to FM 105. Note that FM 409 used Cormier Road east of FM 408, because the current route of FM 105 to the north was not built.

=== FM 409 (1954–1955) ===
Farm to Market Road 409
- Location: Briscoe County
- Existed: October 26, 1954–October 15, 1955

The second use of the FM 409 designation was in Briscoe County, from FM 598, 4.3 miles (6.9 km) north of the Floyd County line, west to the Swisher County line. On October 15, 1955, FM 409 was cancelled and transferred to FM 145.

=== FM 409 (1956–1977) ===
Farm to Market Road 409
- Location: Potter and Randall counties
- Existed: September 21, 1956–September 29, 1977

The third use of the FM 409 designation was in Potter and Randall counties, from the south city limit of Amarillo along Bell Street south to US 60/US 87. FM 409 was cancelled on September 29, 1977, and removed from the highway system.

== FM 410 ==
Farm to Market Road 410
- Location: Red River County
- Length: 52.951 mi (85.216 km)
- Existed: June 22, 1945–present

Farm to Market Road 410 (FM 410) is a 53-mile-long (85 km) route located in Red River County. The two-lane road begins in the southwestern corner of the county at FM 196. It travels north coming to a 180-foot (55 m) concurrency with US 271 between Deport and Bogata. FM 410 continues north intersecting some local and other farm to market roads before it enters Detroit. Through the town, FM 410 carries the name 1st Street and also intersects US 82. Near the northern city limits, the road passes the Detroit High School. The road continues north forming a 380-foot (116 m) with FM 195 before FM 410 continues north towards the Red River. As it approaches the river and the Oklahoma state line, FM 410 begins to curve to the east and later towards the southeast. The highway ends at FM 195 near the community of Blakeney.

When designated on June 22, 1945, FM 410 ran from US 82 in Detroit to Kanawha, north of Woodland. The road would be extended five miles (8.0 km) south from Detroit on May 23, 1951, before being extended north and south on December 18 of the same year. The road was extended south 3.3 miles (5.3 km) to FM 411 near Fulbright and north 7.4 miles (11.9 km) miles to West Scrap (now known as Kiomatia). After taking over the north–south section of FM 411 from Fulbright to US 271 on January 16, 1953, the road was extended further south to Morris Chapel on October 26, 1954. On May 2, 1962, FM 410 was extended from West Scrap to FM 862 (12.0 miles (19.3 km)). On May 24, 1962, the road was extended to the easternmost intersection with FM 195, replacing FM 862 (3.1 miles (5.0 km)). In September 1968, its southern terminus was moved 4.4 miles (7.1 km) to the south and west to end at FM 196.

Junction list

The entire route is in Red River County.

Location	mi	km	Destinations	Notes
	0.0	0.0	FM 196 to SH 37 – Cunningham	
Rugby	7.2	11.6	US 271 east – Bogata	Southern end of US 271 concurrency
Rugby	7.2	11.6	US 271 west – Deport	Northern end of US 271 concurrency
	8.7	14.0	FM 1149 west – Deport	Eastern terminus of FM 1149
	10.8	17.4	FM 411 east – Fulbright	Western terminus of FM 411
	17.1	27.5	FM 194 west – Blossom	Eastern terminus of FM 194
Detroit	19.0	30.6	US 82 (Garner Drive) – Paris, Clarksville	
Detroit	19.6	31.5	FM 3281 east (North McAllister Street)	Western terminus of FM 3281
Woodland	29.8	48.0	FM 195 west – Paris	Southern end of FM 195 concurrency
Woodland	29.8	48.0	FM 195 east – Kanawha	Northern end of FM 195 concurrency
	52.9	85.1	FM 195	
1.000 mi = 1.609 km; 1.000 km = 0.621 mi: Concurrency terminus

== FM 411 ==
Farm to Market Road 411
- Location: Red River County
- Length: 4.533 mi (7.295 km)
- Existed: June 22, 1945–present

Farm to Market Road 411 (FM 411) is a 4 1/2-mile-long (7.2 km) east–west connector between FM 410 and SH 37 (at a point about four and a half miles (7.2 km) north of Bogata) in Red River County. In addition, it provides access to the community of Fulbright.

Designated on June 22, 1945, FM 411 originally ran from US 271 east of Deport and headed north along what is now FM 410, then traveled east along its current routing, before heading northeast towards Clarksville along what is now SH 37. At one point, this entire route was designated as a state highway; it is unknown if the road was ever signed as such. On March 30, 1952, SH 37 was designated on its current alignment, leaving FM 411 to only run from US 271 to SH 37. On January 16, 1953, FM 410 replaced the north–south portion of FM 411.

== FM 412 ==
Farm to Market Road 412
- Location: Red River County
- Length: 15.878 mi (25.553 km)
- Existed: June 22, 1945–present

Farm to Market Road 412 (FM 412) is a 16-mile-long (26 km) route in Red River County. It runs from the community of Boxelder at FM 44 to the west and north to US 82 just east of Clarksville. The designation was assigned on June 22, 1945, as a spur from US 82 to the ranch settlement of Petersburg. It was extended three times: southward 1.7 miles (2.7 km) on July 22, 1949, south 5.2 miles (8.4 km) on October 31, 1957, and east 5.5 miles (8.9 km) on June 28, 1963.

== FM 413 ==
Farm to Market Road 413
- Location: Falls and Limestone counties
- Length: 28.954 mi (46.597 km)
- Existed: June 30, 1945–present

Farm to Market Road 413 (FM 413) runs from Rosebud in Falls County to Kosse in Limestone County by way of Reagan. The road runs about 29 miles (47 km) in a southwest to northeast orientation. The highway begins just outside the eastern Rosebud city limits at Loop 265 heading southeast briefly but soon curves to the northeast. In Wilderville, there is a brief 240-foot-long (73 m) concurrency with FM 2027. After crossing the Brazos River, there is an intersection with FM 1373 and it passes through the community of Highbank. In Highbank, there is a 1/4-mile-long (0.40 km) spur road of FM 413 following a former alignment of the main road. The road continues northeast to Reagan where there is an interchange with the southbound lanes of SH 6. Access to and from SH 6 northbound is provided through the original alignment of SH 6 in Reagan. After intersecting three more minor farm to market roads in Falls County, the highway enters Limestone County and ends at SH 14 in the city of Kosse.

The highway was first designated on June 30, 1945, running from Highbank to Reagan. On November 23, 1948, it was extended northeast to Kosse. It would undergo two extensions in the 1950s: on June 23, 1953, to Wilderville and on November 21, 1956, to Rosebud. Minor realignments have occurred since then.

Junction list

County	Location	mi	km	Destinations	Notes
Falls	Rosebud	0.0– 0.1	0.0– 0.16	Loop 265 – Pleasant Grove, Rosebud	
Falls	Wilderville	6.1	9.8	FM 2027 south – Baileyville	Southern end of FM 2027 concurrency
Falls	Wilderville	6.1	9.8	FM 2027 north – Cedar Springs	Northern end of FM 2027 concurrency
Falls		10.5– 10.6	16.9– 17.1	FM 1373 – Bremond	
Falls	Reagan	17.7	28.5	SH 6 south	Interchange; access to and from southbound SH 6 only
Falls		22.3	35.9	FM 1771 north	Southern terminus of FM 1771
Falls		24.7	39.8	FM 2413 south	Northern terminus of FM 2413
Falls	Alto Springs	26.5	42.6	FM 2745 north	Southern terminus of FM 2745
Limestone	Kosse	29.0	46.7	SH 14 (Mignonette Street) / Filmore Street – Groesbeck, Bremond	
1.000 mi = 1.609 km; 1.000 km = 0.621 mi: Concurrency terminus; Incomplete access

== FM 414 ==
Farm to Market Road 414
- Location: Shelby County
- Length: 6.695 mi (10.775 km)
- Existed: June 11, 1945–present

Farm to Market Road 414 (FM 414) is a 6.7-mile-long (10.8 km) route in Shelby County. Its western terminus is at SH 87 between Center and Shelbyville. It runs east to the community of Campi School near the edge of the Sabine National Forest.

FM 414 was designated on June 11, 1945, along the current route; at the time, the western terminus was a part of US 96.

== FM 415 ==
Farm to Market Road 415
- Location: Shelby County
- Length: 7.848 mi (12.630 km)
- Existed: June 11, 1945–present

Farm to Market Road 415 (FM 415) is a 7.8-mile-long (12.6 km) route connecting FM 138 in Stockman to SH 87 just south of Timpson, in western Shelby County.

FM 415 was designated on June 11, 1945, on the current route.

== FM 416 ==
Farm to Market Road 416
- Location: Freestone and Navarro counties
- Length: 15.535 mi (25.001 km)
- Existed: September 10, 1968–present

Farm to Market Road 416 (FM 416) is a 15 1/2-mile-long (24.9 km) route in Freestone and Navarro counties generally following the southern shoreline of the Richland-Chambers Reservoir. The road begins at the intersection of SH 75 and Runnells Street on the border of Streetman, Freestone County and heads north almost immediately entering Navarro County. The road soon curves to the east where it intersects numerous access roads to the reservoir. After passing through the community of Winkler, it heads back into Freestone County and passes through an unnamed settlement featuring numerous businesses, churches, and ranch homes. FM 416 ends at an intersection with FM 488 just south of the reservoir's dam. The designation was applied on September 10, 1968, by replacing a portion of FM 246.

=== FM 416 (1945–1966) ===
Farm to Market Road 416
- Location: Shelby County
- Length: 3.4 mi (5.5 km)
- Existed: June 11, 1945–September 9, 1966

The first FM 416 existed in the area of Paxton, Shelby County from June 11, 1945, to August 31, 1966. The road ran a distance of 3.4 miles (5.5 km) from Paxton Center Road to US 84 in Paxton. The designation was deleted upon the overlay of FM 699 on September 9, 1966, when it was extended north from its former terminus.

== FM 417 ==
Farm to Market Road 417
- Location: Shelby County
- Length: 19.210 mi (30.915 km)
- Existed: June 11, 1945–present

Farm to Market Road 417 (FM 417) is a 19-mile-long (31 km) route in Shelby County running from US 96 near the community of Choice to FM 139 in the town of Huxley within the confines of the Sabine National Forest. The highway travels east from its western terminus for about one mile (1.6 km) before turning north at FM 2140. After heading through a reverse curve featuring a grade crossing with the Timber Rock Railroad, FM 417 heads north and northeast through a mix of forest and ranch lands. It intersects FM 2975 at its northern terminus before continuing to Shelbyville. In Shelbyville, there is a 700-foot (210 m) concurrency with SH 87. Continuing east from the end of the concurrency, FM 417 intersects FM 2694 at the latter's western terminus and enters Sabine National Forest upon crossing the Beauchamp Creek. Though within a national forest, most of the southern side of the road features small ranches. The road enters the town limits of Huxley, a town whose borders generally follow local roads, then ends at FM 139 less than a mile from Toledo Bend Reservoir.

The highway was first designated on June 11, 1945, running 2.8 miles (4.5 km) southwest from Shelbyville. On July 14, 1949, the road was extended further west to what was then a proposed routing of US 96 (US 96 at the time ran along SH 87) bringing the total length to 7.1 miles (11.4 km). On April 28, 1950, FM 417 was shortened by 0.4 miles (0.64 km) as it was rerouted toward Choice. On October 29, 1953, FM 417 was extended southwest to US 96. This configuration would last until August 13, 1968, when FM 417 took over all of FM 1820 northeast of Shelbyville.

== FM 418 ==
Farm to Market Road 418
- Location: Hardin County
- Length: 12.087 mi (19.452 km)
- Existed: June 13, 1945–present

Farm to Market Road 418 (FM 418) is a 12-mile-long (19 km) route located in Hardin County. The road begins at the intersection of 5th Street and U.S. Highways 69 and 287 in Kountze. After passing through a residential neighborhood of Kountze, the road heads east through more rural areas of the county crossing the Village Creek. Following the crossing of the creek, it enters the community of Reeves containing a mix of residences and ranches. It also intersects FM 1122 in the community. Now traveling in a southeasterly direction, FM 418 enters the city of Silsbee passing through its northern reaches. Northeast of the city center, the road intersects FM 92 at North 5th Street. The road heads through a wooded area still within the city limits as it curves to the south and ends at an intersection with US 96 Bus.

The highway was designated on June 13, 1945, running from US 69 0.5 miles (0.80 km) north of Kountze northeastward 3.5 miles (5.6 km), then southward 3.9 miles (6.3 km) to US 69 south of Kountze, for a total distance of 7.4 miles (11.9 km). On August 1. 1947, the road was shortened to a length of 2.4 miles (3.9 km) traveling along its current route today starting at US 69/US 287. On March 21, 1950, the road was extended across Village Creek through Reeves to end at FM 92 in Silsbee, replacing FM 419. The last change to the road occurred on June 1, 1965, when FM 418 was extended from FM 92 to what is now its eastern terminus, the cross road then being US 96.

== FM 419 ==
Farm to Market Road 419
- Location: Nolan and Fisher counties
- Length: 27.801 mi (44.741 km)
- Existed: May 23, 1951–present

Farm to Market Road 419 (FM 419) is located in Nolan and Fisher counties. It runs on a zigzagging route from BL I-20 and Bus. SH 70 (formerly US 80) in Sweetwater to US 180 in Roby.

FM 419 was designated on May 23, 1951, from US 180 at Roby southwest to a road intersection for a distance of 7.6 miles (12.2 km). On November 4, 1953, it was extended 21.1 miles (34.0 km) southwest and south to US 80 at Sweetwater, replacing FM 1572 (the connecting section was designated on October 28, 1953).

=== FM 419 (1945) ===
Farm to Market Road 419
- Location: Hardin County
- Existed: June 13, 1945–March 21, 1950

A previous route numbered FM 419 was designated on June 13, 1945, from Silsbee northwest to Reeves. FM 419 was cancelled on March 21, 1950, and combined with FM 418.

== FM 420 ==
Farm to Market Road 420
- Location: Hardin County
- Length: 3.858 mi (6.209 km)
- Existed: June 13, 1945–present

Farm to Market Road 420 (FM 420) is a 3.9-mile-long (6.3 km) spur road from U.S. Highways 69 and 287 east to the unincorporated community of McKinney in northern Hardin County. Starting at the pair of U.S. Highways between Kountze and Village Mills, the road heads east passing the visitors center for the Big Thicket National Preserve and a pair of RV parks. It winds its way east with the preserve being located on the north side of the road before it ends in a small clearing where some houses and a cemetery are located, the community of McKinney. State maintenance and the FM 420 designation ends at the intersection of McNeely Road and Jordan Road.

FM 420 was designated on June 13, 1945, on the current route.

== FM 421 ==
Farm to Market Road 421
- Location: Hardin County
- Length: 13.117 mi (21.110 km)
- Existed: June 13, 1945–present

Farm to Market Road 421 (FM 421) is a 13.1-mile-long (21.1 km) route in Hardin County. Its western terminus is at SH 326 near Sour Lake. It passes through the communities of Pine Ridge and Ariola before reaching Lumberton, where it intersects US 69/US 287. Its eastern terminus is at US 96 in Lumberton.

FM 421 was designated on June 13, 1945, as a spur of US 69/US 287, at a length of 8.2 miles (13.2 km). On November 23, 1948, the designation was extended to SH 326. On July 15, 1949, the route was truncated to its original length, but it was extended to a length of 10.1 miles (16.3 km) on November 20, 1951. It was extended to SH 326 again on December 17, 1952. The designation was extended a short distance to the east on July 11, 1968, when it was routed along Country Lane Drive to US 96. The easternmost 0.9-mile (1.4 km) segment of the highway was transferred to Urban Road 421 (UR 421) on June 27, 1995. The designation of that section reverted to FM 421 with the elimination of the Urban Road system on November 15, 2018.

== FM 422 ==
Farm to Market Road 422
- Location: Baylor and Archer counties
- Length: 25.603 mi (41.204 km)
- Existed: June 27, 1945–present

Farm to Market Road 422 (FM 422) is a 25.6-mile-long (41.2 km) route in Baylor and Archer counties in Central Texas. Beginning in the city of Seymour at an intersection which includes US 82, Bus. US 183/277/283, and in addition to SH 114, FM 422 heads east along California Street before performing a reverse curve to the north where it transitions to Archer Road. Just outside the city limits, there is an interchange with the Seymour bypass, which carries US 183/US 277/US 283. East of the interchange, the road heads toward the settlement of England and has a one-mile-long (1.6 km) concurrency with FM 1170. After entering Archer County, FM 422 ends at an intersection with FM 210 about three miles (4.8 km) south of Lake Kickapoo and twelve miles (19 km) west of Archer City.

FM 422 was designated on June 27, 1945, as a spur from Seymour to England, running approximately eight miles (13 km). On October 31, 1957, the road was extended east to its present eastern terminus at FM 210. This configuration lasted until a road realignment was completed in Seymour on May 28, 2015. Before the realignment, FM 422 began at Main Street and traveled east along Nevada Street. The road then turned to the north at Stadium Drive in front of the Seymour Middle School and traveled four blocks before turning right onto Archer Road and continuing as it does today. Upon the completion of the realignment, which allows traffic to head directly to Main Street without passing through 90-degree bends, the former routing was transferred to the city.

== FM 423 ==
Farm to Market Road 423
- Location: Denton County
- Length: 10.811 mi (17.399 km)
- Existed: July 2, 1945–present

Farm to Market Road 423 (FM 423) is located in Denton County.

== FM 424 ==
Farm to Market Road 424
- Location: Cross Roads
- Length: 1.551 mi (2.496 km)
- Existed: July 2, 1945–present

Farm to Market Road 424 (FM 424) is located in Cross Roads. It begins at US 380; the right-of-way also continues southward from this point as Naylor Road, which travels into Oak Point. The route runs northward for approximately one and a half miles (2.4 km) before ending at US 377.

FM 424 was first designated on July 2, 1945, connecting Aubrey to the former community of New Hope at what was then SH 24 (now US 380). The portion in Aubrey was removed on September 25, 1962, and a portion of it became the former SH 99 (now US 377).

== FM 425 ==
Farm to Market Road 425
- Location: Kleberg County
- Length: 1.883 mi (3.030 km)
- Existed: September 21, 1955–present

Farm to Market Road 425 (FM 425) is located in Kleberg County. It runs from US 77 Bus. in Kingsville, past an interchange with I-69E/US 77, to the access gate at Naval Air Station Kingsville.

FM 425 was designated on September 21, 1955, on the current route.

=== FM 425 (1945–1952) ===
Farm to Market Road 425
- Location: Denton and Wise counties
- Existed: July 2, 1945–June 25, 1952

The first route numbered FM 425 was designated on July 2, 1945, from Sanger to Bolivar. On July 15, 1949, the road was extended west 3.9 miles (6.3 km). On May 23, 1951, the road was extended west five miles (8.0 km) to FM 1656 at the Denton/Wise County Line. On July 5, 1951, the 2.7 miles (4.3 km) FM 1656 became part of FM 425. On November 20, 1951, the road was extended east 3.6 miles (5.8 km) to a road intersection. FM 425 was cancelled on March 15, 1952, and transferred to FM 455.

== FM 426 ==
Farm to Market Road 426
- Location: Denton County
- Existed: July 2, 1945–present

Farm to Market Road 426 (FM 426) is located in Denton County. It runs from the Denton city limit to the shoreline of Lewisville Lake.

FM 426 was designated on July 2, 1945, from US 77 in Denton to a point near the Lewisville Lake shoreline. On June 27, 1995, the route was redesignated Urban Road 426 (UR 426). On June 30, 2016, the segment within the city of Denton was cancelled. The designation of the remaining segment reverted to FM 426 with the elimination of the Urban Road system on November 15, 2018.

== FM 427 ==
Farm to Market Road 427
- Location: Wilson County
- Length: 5.291 mi (8.515 km)
- Existed: September 21, 1955–present

Farm to Market Road 427 (FM 427) is located in Wilson County. It runs from US 181 in Poth to FM 537 northeast of the town.

FM 427 was designated on September 21, 1955, from FM 541 1.7 miles (2.7 km) east of Poth northwest to FM 537. On October 26, 1956, the route was changed to end at US 181 and intersect FM 537 further east, adding 0.7 miles (1.1 km) to its total length.

=== FM 427 (1945) ===
Farm to Market Road 427
- Location: Collin and Denton counties
- Existed: July 2, 1945–January 29, 1953

A previous route numbered FM 427 was designated on July 2, 1945, from SH 10 in Pilot Point in Denton County to the Denton–Collin county line. On November 23, 1948, the road was extended to SH 289 in Celina. On July 14, 1949, the road was extended east to a road intersection 4.3 miles (6.9 km) east of Celina. On May 23, 1951, the road was extended east to FM 543 in Weston bringing the length of the highway to 21.6 miles (34.8 km). FM 427 was cancelled on January 29, 1953, and its mileage was transferred to FM 455.

== FM 428 ==
Farm to Market Road 428
- Location: Denton and Collin counties
- Length: 24.685 mi (39.727 km)
- Existed: July 2, 1945–present

Farm to Market Road 428 (FM 428) is a 25.8-mile-long (41.5 km) route in Denton and Collin counties (of which 24.7 miles (39.8 km) is on its own route). It begins at US 77 in Denton and travels northeast towards Loop 288. Past Loop 288, the highway curves to the east as it exits the city limits of Denton. After crossing a spur of the Ray Roberts Lake State Park, it enters the town of Aubrey, crosses US 377, and passes through western reaches of Celina. FM 428 briefly follows the Denton–Collin county line before fully entering Collin County and ending at FM 455.

The highway was first designated on July 2, 1945, running from Aubrey at SH 10 towards the east for 4.6 miles (7.4 km). On May 23, 1951, it was extended further east to FM 1385 bringing the length to 5.9 miles (9.5 km). Then on September 27, 1960, another eastward extension, this time to FM 455 in Celina, brought its length to 14.4 miles (23.2 km). The last major change to FM 428 occurred on September 25, 1962, when it took over a portion of SH 99 from Denton to Aubrey. On June 27, 1995, the 2.3-mile (3.7 km) section from US 77 to Loop 288 was redesignated Urban Road 428 (UR 428). The designation of this section reverted to FM 428 with the elimination of the Urban Road system on November 15, 2018.

Junction list

County	Location	mi	km	Destinations	Notes
Denton	Denton	0.0	0.0	US 77 south (Elm Street) / Sherman Drive	US 77 on a one-way pair
Denton	Denton	0.1	0.16	US 77 north (Locust Street)	US 77 on a one-way pair
Denton	Denton	2.3– 2.4	3.7– 3.9	Loop 288 / US 380 Truck	Interchange
Denton	Denton	6.7	10.8	FM 2153 west to FM 2164	Eastern terminus of FM 2153
Denton	Aubrey	11.1	17.9	FM 3524 north (Sherman Drive) / Main Street	Southern terminus of FM 3524
Denton	Aubrey	11.8	19.0	US 377 – Pilot Point, Denton	
Denton	Aubrey	14.5	23.3	FM 2931 to US 380	
Denton		17.2	27.7	FM 1385 north – Pilot Point	Western end of FM 1385 concurrency
Denton		18.2	29.3	FM 1385 south to US 380	Eastern end of FM 1385 concurrency
Collin	Celina	25.8	41.5	FM 455 (Walnut Street) – Pilot Point	
1.000 mi = 1.609 km; 1.000 km = 0.621 mi: Concurrency terminus

== FM 429 ==
Farm to Market Road 429
- Location: Kaufman and Hunt counties
- Length: 29.626 mi (47.678 km)
- Existed: June 28, 1945–present

Farm to Market Road 429 (FM 429) is a 29.6-mile-long (47.6 km) route connecting rural Kaufman County to Terrell then to the Lake Tawakoni area in Hunt County. The road begins at an intersection with SH 243 at a point between Kaufman and Canton. FM 429 heads north and northwest through the northeast quadrant of the county. FM 2727 has its northern terminus at an intersection with FM 429 in this area. The road has an interchange with I-20's exit 506 southwest of Elmo; this interchange also has a road connecting FM 429 with FM 2728 which shares a one-half-mile-long (0.80 km) concurrency with FM 429. North of the concurrency, FM 429 continues northwest before it reaches the city limits of Terrell at an intersection with US 80.

US 80 and FM 429 together head west for one-half-mile-long (0.80 km) before FM 429 breaks off and heads northeast through a rural portion of Kaufman County northeast of Terrell. The road heads off of its northeastern bearing to travel towards Ables Springs where it intersects FM 2728 at its northern terminus. FM 429 heads due east for about one and a half miles (2.4 km) before curving to the north and enters Hunt County. The road soon curves to the northeast as it parallels the Lake Tawakoni shoreline for about one mile (1.6 km) before ending at FM 751.

FM 429 was designated on June 28, 1945, running from SH 243 to 0.9 miles (1.4 km) mile north of Black Jack, a community south of the FM 2727 intersection. On January 29, 1953, FM 429 was extended north 3.5 miles (5.6 km) over previously-unnumbered roads and the entire 4.9-mile (7.9 km) length of the former FM 1837 to US 80 east of downtown Terrell. The road was then extended to 6.9 miles (11.1 km) north of US 80 on October 28, 1953, bringing the road to a 21.7-mile (34.9 km) length. It has been extended twice more: by 4.5 miles (7.2 km) on November 21, 1956, and by 4.8 miles (7.7 km) on September 20, 1961.

== FM 430 ==
Farm to Market Road 430
- Location: Brooks County
- Length: 3.291 mi (5.296 km)
- Existed: June 22, 1945–present

Farm to Market Road 430 (FM 430) is a 3.3-mile-long (5.3 km) spur road from FM 755 in rural Brooks County. It begins at a reconfigured intersection with FM 755 in the southern portion of the county, about seven miles (11 km) west of Rachal. The two-lane road heads north for two miles (3.2 km) through desolate lands populated by a few ranches. At the two-mile mark, the road curves to the west and continues for another 1.25 miles (2.01 km) before ending at the entrance to the Tacubaya Ranch. State maintenance ends at this point but the road continues as County Road 314. When the road was designated on June 22, 1945, FM 430 included its current road and current FM 755 to Rachal at US 281. The road achieved its current routing on November 26, 1951, when FM 755 took over most of the road leaving FM 430 on a 3.3 miles (5.3 km) route.

== FM 431 ==
Farm to Market Road 431
- Location: Falls County
- Length: 13.564 mi (21.829 km)
- Existed: June 30, 1945–present

Farm to Market Road 431 (FM 431) is a 13.6-mile-long (21.9 km) route located in southern Falls County. It begins at SH 320 in the community of Westphalia. It heads on a zig-zagging route generally heading east to Travis where it has a 0.1-mile-long (160 m) concurrency with US 77. East of there, the road travels on a much straighter path to the east-northeast path where it intersects FM 3145 and ends at FM 2027 in the community of Cedar Springs.

The highway was designated on June 30, 1945, running from Travis to Cedar Springs. Around its current eastern end, the road traveled another 0.4 miles (0.64 km) southeast along modern FM 2027. This portion of the road was transferred to FM 2027 on October 14, 1960. Three more extensions to the west would occur in the 1960s: a three-mile (4.8 km) extension on August 28, 1963, from US 77, a further 1.3-mile (2.1 km) extension on May 6, 1964, and to its current western terminus on July 11, 1968.

== FM 432 ==
Farm to Market Road 432
- Location: Wilbarger County
- Length: 7.595 mi (12.223 km)
- Existed: July 9, 1945–present

Farm to Market Road 432 (FM 432) is located in Wilbarger County, near the Oklahoma state line. The 7.6-mile-long (12.2 km) road travels from an interchange with US 287 in the community of Tolbert north to FM 91 south of Odell. Near the road's midpoint, it intersects FM 924. Designated on July 9, 1945, FM 432 has not been changed significantly since it was created.

== FM 433 ==
Farm to Market Road 433
- Location: Wilbarger County
- Length: 14.039 mi (22.594 km)
- Existed: July 9, 1945–present

Farm to Market Road 433 (FM 433) is a 15.2-mile-long (24.5 km) route in Wilbarger County acting as a southern bypass of Vernon. The road begins at an intersection with US 70 in Lockett, five miles (8.0 km) southwest of Vernon. It heads east then turns to the south. At FM 2074, it curves back to the east making a beeline towards US 183 and US 283. After intersecting FM 3207, the road forms a 1.1-mile-long (1.8 km) concurrency with US 183/US 283 before breaking off towards the east again. In this segment of the road, FM 433 intersects FM 1949, FM 3430, and FM 2897. It ends at an interchange with US 70/US 183/US 287 east of Vernon at the community of Oklaunion.

The road was first designated on July 9, 1945, running from Lockett to US 183/US 283 south of Vernon. The road was extended to its current length on October 31, 1957, when FM 433 was routed along previously unnumbered roads.

== FM 434 ==
Farm to Market Road 434
- Location: Falls and McLennan counties
- Length: 21.0 mi (33.8 km)
- Existed: July 9, 1945–present

Farm to Market Road 434 (FM 434) is a 21.0-mile-long (33.8 km) route in the vicinity of Waco. It begins in the community of Chilton at SH 7 and travels north through Falls County. Upon crossing into McLennan County, it travels along the city limits of Robinson before breaking off the boundary at FM 3400. At SH 6/Loop 340, the through movement on FM 434 is completed along the former's frontage roads. North of SH 6/Loop 340, the road enters Waco. The highway ends at Bus. US 77. From here, the road continues through the campus of Baylor University as University Parks Drive, passing the Texas Sports Hall of Fame before reaching an interchange with I-35 and US 77.

FM 434 was designated on July 9, 1945, running from the community of Asa to Waco at La Salle Avenue (now Bus. US 77) via Downsville. On July 14, 1949, the road was extended south to the Falls County line. The road was extended to Satin on February 27, 1958, and was extended to its current southern terminus on April 22, 1958, taking over FM 2116. On September 26, 1963, the road was extended north further into Waco to I-35. On May 26, 1970, a spur connection in Waco was added. On June 27, 1995, the segment of FM 434 west of SH 6 was redesignated Urban Road 434 (UR 434). On April 27, 2017, the section of FM 434 from I-35 to Bus. US 77 was given to the city of Waco, as was the spur connection. The designation of the section west of SH 6 reverted to FM 434 with the elimination of the Urban Road system on November 15, 2018.

Junction list

County	Location	mi	km	Destinations	Notes
Falls	Chilton	0.0	0.0	SH 7 – Marlin	
Falls		9.2	14.8	FM 2839 west	Eastern terminus of FM 2839
McLennan	Asa	11.1	17.9	FM 2643 west (Leona Parkway)	Eastern terminus of FM 2643
McLennan	Downsville	13.9	22.4	FM 3400 north (University Parks Drive) – Waco	Southern terminus of FM 3400
McLennan	Waco	19.3	31.1	SH 6 / Loop 340	Interchange; through movement via SH 6/Loop 340 frontage roads
McLennan	Waco	19.6	31.5	FM 3400 south / South 3rd Street	Northern terminus of FM 3400
McLennan	Waco	21.3	34.3	Bus. US 77 (La Salle Avenue/South Loop)	
1.000 mi = 1.609 km; 1.000 km = 0.621 mi

== FM 435 ==
Farm to Market Road 435
- Location: Yoakum County
- Length: 8.991 mi (14.470 km)
- Existed: May 23, 1951–present

Farm to Market Road 435 (FM 435) is located in Yoakum County. It runs from FM 213 (formerly FM 396) near Bennett to US 82 and US 380 east of Plains. It was designated on its current routing on May 23, 1951.

=== FM 435 (1945–1948) ===
Farm to Market Road 435
- Location: McLennan County
- Existed: July 9, 1945–November 23, 1948

A previous route numbered FM 435 was designated on July 9, 1945, from Elm Mott to Leroy in McLennan County. FM 435 was cancelled on November 23, 1948, and became a portion of FM 308.

== FM 436 ==
Farm to Market Road 436
- Location: Bell County
- Length: 13.520 mi (21.758 km)
- Existed: June 11, 1945–present

Farm to Market Road 436 (FM 436) is located in Bell County. At a length of 13.5 miles (21.7 km), the highway begins at the interchange complex of I-35, I-14/US 190, and SH 317 in Belton. The highway travels southeast to Little River-Academy where it intersects SH 95. East of the town, FM 436 makes a sharp turn to the north where it has an interchange with US 190 and SH 36 and ends in the community of Heidenheimer at US 190 Bus.

FM 436 was created on June 11, 1945, to run from Belton to Little River (the former name of Little River-Academy). There were two extensions of the road on September 9, 1948, when it was brought east of Little River to SH 95 and on October 26, 1949, upon slight realignments at both ends. On December 18, 1951, the road was brought to its current length when it was extended to what was then US 190 in Heidenheimer. On June 27, 1995, the section of FM 436 west of Loop 121 was redesignated Urban Road 436 (UR 436). The designation of this section reverted to FM 436 with the elimination of the Urban Road system on November 15, 2018.

Junction list

The entire route is in Bell County.

Location	mi	km	Destinations	Notes
Belton	0.0– 0.1	0.0– 0.16	I-35 / I-14 / US 190 north (Main Street) / SH 317 – Killeen, Fort Cavazos, Austin, Waco	Western terminus of I-14 at I-35; I-35 exit 293B; southern terminus of SH 317
Belton	1.0	1.6	Loop 121 north	Southern terminus of Loop 121
	2.4	3.9	FM 1123 south – Holland	Northern terminus of FM 1123
Little River-Academy	9.3	15.0	SH 95 – Holland, Temple	
Heidenheimer	13.1– 13.2	21.1– 21.2	US 190 / SH 36 – Cameron, Temple	Interchange
Heidenheimer	13.5	21.7	Bus. US 190 / Heidenheimer Road	
1.000 mi = 1.609 km; 1.000 km = 0.621 mi

== FM 437 ==
Farm to Market Road 437
- Location: Milam and Bell counties
- Length: 20.360 mi (32.766 km)
- Existed: June 6, 1946–present

Farm to Market Road 437 (FM 437) is a 20.4-mile-long (32.8 km) route in Milam and Bell counties. It begins in the community of Davilla in Milam County at FM 487 and travels north. It intersects FM 1915 and in the community of Val Verde, FM 2268. Upon entering Bell County, the road comes into Rogers where it intersects Mesquite Avenue (US 190/SH 36/FM 2184) in the center of the town. It heads north through Red Ranger where FM 437 intersects FM 940 at the latter's western terminus before itself ends at SH 53 in the community of Zabcikville.

The road connecting Rogers and Zabcikville was designated as FM 437 on June 6, 1946. It was extended south to Joe Lee School, southwest of Rogers, on December 17, 1952. On March 28, 1953, FM 2184 replaced the portion of the road from Joe Lee School to Rogers while FM 437's route south of Rogers was moved to follow its current route to the Bell County line. On October 26, 1954, the southern terminus of the road was moved to Val Verde. On June 25, 1962, the segment to Davilla was designated.

On September 24, 2020, FM 437 was rerouted on a more direct route, and the old route became FM Spur 437.

== FM 438 ==
Farm to Market Road 438
- Location: Bell County
- Length: 9.853 mi (15.857 km)
- Existed: June 11, 1945–present

Farm to Market Road 438 (FM 438) is a 9.9-mile-long (15.9 km) route in eastern Bell County. The road begins at the intersection of Loop 363 and Young Avenue in the northeastern quadrant of Temple. The road generally heads in an eastern direction where it intersects FM 2086 just outside of the Temple city limits. Near the community of Oenaville, the road turns to the north at its intersection with FM 3369. FM 438 ends at FM 935 in the community of Belfalls, only feet from the Bell–Falls county line.

When the road was designated on June 11, 1945, FM 438 ran from downtown Temple to Oenaville. It was extended north to its current terminus at Belfalls on November 21, 1956. The 2.3-mile (3.7 km) segment of FM 438 internal to Loop 363 was transferred to the city of Temple's jurisdiction on November 29, 1990. Prior to the transfer, FM 438 started at Adams Avenue (SH 53) and traveled along 8th Avenue, French Avenue, 12th Avenue, Garfield Avenue, 14th Avenue, and Shell Avenue through the city.

== FM 439 ==
Farm to Market Road 439
- Location: Bell County
- Length: 21.469 mi (34.551 km)
- Existed: June 6, 1945–present

Farm to Market Road 439 (FM 439) is located in Bell County stretching from US 190 Bus. in Killeen to SH 317 in Belton. The main route is about 17.3-mile-long (27.8 km) and there is also a spur, Spur 439, that runs from a point in Old Nolanville Road in Nolanville, across US 190 to FM 439.

The road was designated on June 6, 1945, from Killeen east for four miles (6.4 km). On October 28, 1953, the road was extended to the Nolanville area (for a total of 11.1 miles (17.9 km)) with the addition of a spur road through Nolanville. It was extended east 3.0 miles (4.8 km) on October 26, 1954. It was extended northeast 2.5 miles (4.0 km) on July 28, 1955. On November 21, 1956, FM 439 was extended 2.6 miles (4.2 km) to FM 2271. On July 16, 1975, FM 439 was extended east to SH 317, replacing a section of FM 2271. On June 21, 1985, the section along 8th Street was given to the city of Killeen. Instead, FM 439 was rerouted west via Rancier Avenue to RM 440 (Fort Hood Street). On January 27, 1988, RM 440 was cancelled, so FM 439 was extended south to US 190 and SH 195 (which replaced the remainder of RM 440 north of Florence; the old route west of Florence was renumbered SH 138). On May 24, 1990, the spur was extended 0.6 miles (0.97 km) from US 190 to Old Nolanville Road. The route was redesignated Urban Road 439 (UR 439) on June 27, 1995. The route's current configuration was established on January 31, 2002, when the portion of the road from the gate of Fort Hood (now Fort Cavazos) to FM 2410 was returned to the city of Killeen; the section from Fort Hood Gate to US 190 and SH 195 became part of SH 195, and FM 439 was rerouted replacing a section of FM 2410 to US 190 Bus. The designation reverted to FM 439 with the elimination of the Urban Road system on November 15, 2018.

== FM 440 ==
Farm to Market Road 440
- Location: Archer County
- Length: 3.563 mi (5.734 km)
- Existed: October 29, 1992–present

Farm to Market Road 440 (FM 440) is located in Archer County. It runs from US 82 Bus./US 277 Bus. and College Avenue in Holliday to FM 1954 east of the town. The highway is 3.6 miles (5.8 km) long. FM 440 was designated on October 29, 1992. On July 31, 1997, FM 440 was extended north and west to FM 368. Construction has not started on the extension from US 82 to FM 368.

A 0.7-mile-long (1.1 km) spur road of FM 440 was designated on July 31, 1997, in the town of Holliday but construction has not been started.

=== FM/RM 440 (1945–1988) ===
Ranch to Market Road 440
- Location: Bell and Williamson counties
- Existed: June 11, 1945 (Note: RM 440 was previously designated as FM 440 from 1945 to 1956.)–January 27, 1988

A previous route numbered FM 440 was designated on June 11, 1945, from Killeen southwest five miles (8.0 km). On May 26, 1949, the road was extended south 3.8 miles (6.1 km) to a point 3 miles (4.8 km) south of Reese Creek School. On May 23, 1951, the road was extended 12.7 miles (20.4 km) south to SH 195 (now SH 138) north of Florence. The road was redesignated Ranch to Market Road 440 (RM 440) on October 1, 1956. On October 15, 1985, a 0.7-mile (1.1 km) section of the road along Fort Hood Street from FM 439 to Loop 518 (which was redesignated as Bus. US 190 on June 21, 1990) was added. RM 440 was cancelled on January 27, 1988; the section from SH 195 (which the section west of RM 440 was renumbered as SH 138) to US 190 was transferred to rerouted SH 195 and the section from US 190 to FM 439 was transferred to FM 439. That section of FM 439 that was previously RM 440 was transferred to SH 195 on January 31, 2002.

== FM 441 ==
Farm to Market Road 441
- Location: Wharton County
- Length: 21.562 mi (34.701 km)
- Existed: July 9, 1945–present

Farm to Market Road 441 (FM 441) is located in Wharton County. It is 21.6 miles (34.8 km) long. It begins near the settlement of Danevang in the southern portion of the county at SH 71. The road heads west then curves to the north as it passes through a largely agricultural portion of the state. In the community of Hillje, FM 441 has a 1/2-mile-long (0.80 km) concurrency with Loop 524 before heading back north. The road passes over Future I-69/US 59 which has ramps to the southbound lanes of the highway (access to and from the northbound lanes of Future I-69/US 59 is provided through Loop 524). It continues north to its end at FM 1300 northwest of El Campo.

When it was designated on July 9, 1945, FM 441 was a six-mile-long (9.7 km) spur of US 59 (now part of Loop 524) that ran north from Hillje. On February 25, 1949, the road was extended to a point 8.8 miles (14.2 km) south of Hillje. The road was brought to its current length on October 31, 1957, by extending the road east to SH 71.

== FM 442 ==
Farm to Market Road 442
- Location: Wharton and Fort Bend counties
- Length: 18.430 mi (29.660 km)
- Existed: July 9, 1945–present

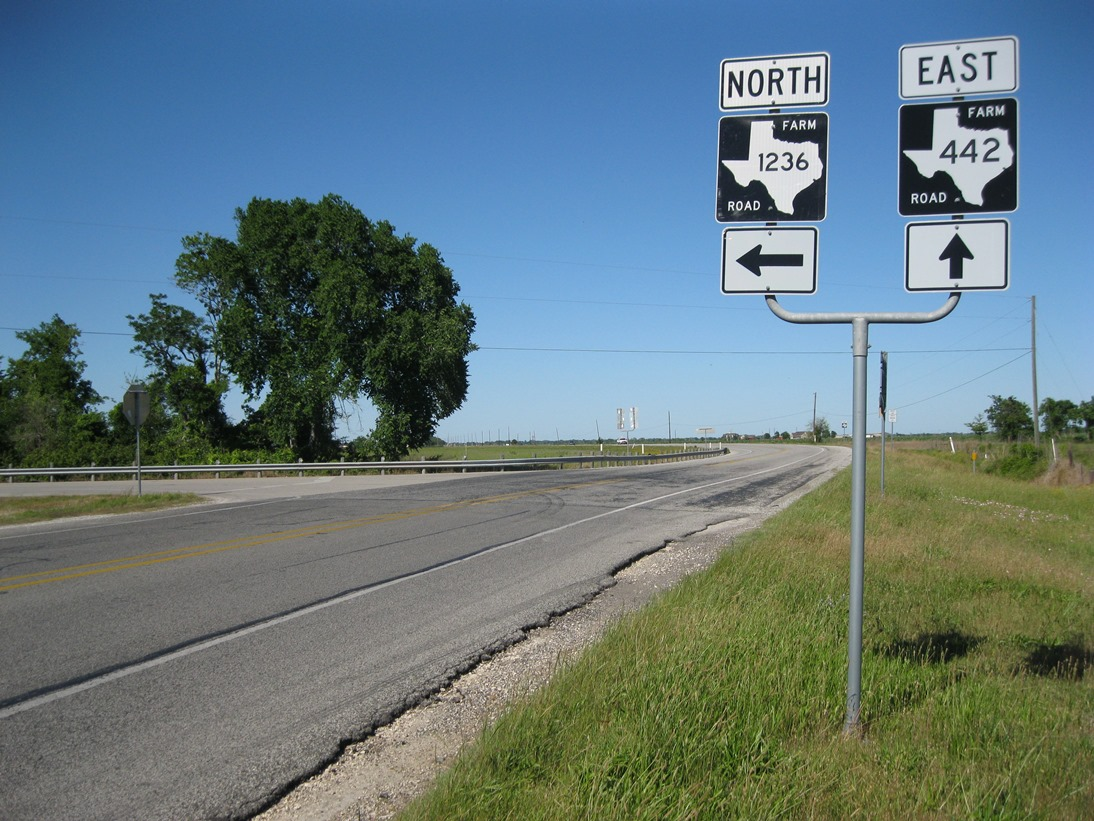
FM 442 at the southern terminus of FM 1236

Farm to Market Road 442 (FM 442) is located in Wharton and Fort Bend counties. The highway begins at SH 60 at Lane City in Wharton County, runs to the northeast through Boling-Iago and ends on SH 36 southeast of Needville in Fort Bend County.

It starts as a two-lane road at SH 60 in Lane City. In town, the road is also called Lenert Street. From there, FM 442 goes northeast 1.9 miles (3.1 km) to its intersection with FM 1096. From there, the road turns east-southeast for one mile (1.6 km) and east-northeast for one mile (1.6 km). FM 442 turns to the northeast and goes three miles (4.8 km) to Boling-Iago where it intersects FM 1301 at a four-way stop sign.

From Boling, FM 442 crosses Caney Creek about 260 yards (238 m) north of FM 1301 and continues northeast for 1.4 miles (2.3 km). At this point the highway turns directly east for 0.6 miles (0.97 km) before curving to the northeast again for 2.3 miles (3.7 km). FM 442 turns to the east-northeast for 1.6 miles (2.6 km), crossing the San Bernard River into Fort Bend County. The highway veers northeast again for two miles (3.2 km) to its intersection with FM 1236. After a slight jog, FM 442 continues in the same direction for three and a half miles (5.6 km) where it terminates at SH 36 to the southeast of Needville.

FM 442 was designated on July 9, 1945, from SH 60 at Lane City to Boling. It was extended 5.2 miles (8.4 km) from Boling to the Fort Bend County line on February 25, 1948. The highway was extended again to SH 36 on July 22, 1949.

Junction list

County	Location	mi	km	Destinations	Notes
Wharton	Lane City	0.0	0.0	SH 60 – Bay City, Wharton	
Wharton		1.9	3.1	FM 1096 north – Iago	Southern terminus of FM 1096
Wharton	Boling	6.8	10.9	FM 1301 – Pledger, Wharton	
Fort Bend		14.9	24.0	FM 1236 north – Needville	Southern terminus of FM 1236
Fort Bend	Needville	18.4	29.6	SH 36 – Damon, Needville	
1.000 mi = 1.609 km; 1.000 km = 0.621 mi

== FM 443 ==
Farm to Market Road 443
- Location: DeWitt and Gonzales counties
- Length: 12.340 mi (19.859 km)
- Existed: July 9, 1945–present

Farm to Market Road 443 (FM 443) is a 12.3-mile-long (19.8 km) route in DeWitt and Gonzales counties. The road starts at an intersection with SH 111 (just east of US 183) in the settlement of Hochheim in DeWitt County. Paralleling the Guadalupe River, the road enters Gonzales County near the settlement of Dreyer. FM 443 then starts to travel on a zig-zagging route north where it intersects FM 533. In the community of Kokernot, FM 443 ends at US 90 Alt.

The highway was designated on July 9, 1945, running from the community of Dozer via Kokernot to SH 200 (now US 90 Alt.). On December 16, 1948, the road was extended south to the DeWitt–Gonzales county line. It was brought to its current length on July 21, 1949, when the southern terminus was moved to what is now its current terminus.

== FM 444 ==
Farm to Market Road 444
- Location: Victoria County
- Length: 29.948 mi (48.197 km)
- Existed: July 9, 1945–present

Farm to Market Road 444 (FM 444) is a thirty-mile-long (48 km) route in the northeastern quadrant of Victoria County. The road is shaped as an arc around the city of Victoria and travels through a very sparse area. The only other state-maintained roads that FM 444 intersects throughout its trip are at its southern terminus, FM 1686, at an interchange with I-69/US 59 in Inez, and its northern terminus at US 77.

When the road was designated on July 9, 1945, it was a six-and-a-half-mile-long (10.5 km) spur road from US 59 in Inez south to oil fields in the vicinity of the Garcitas Creek. On November 23, 1948, FM 444 was extended northwest 2.0 miles (3.2 km). On May 25, 1962, the road was extended southeast and southwest to FM 1686, replacing FM 2545. The road was extended northwest 2.6 miles (4.2 km) on July 11, 1968, ending it 5 miles (8.0 km) northwest of Inez. On November 3, 1972, the road was extended northwest 2.1 miles (3.4 km). On September 5, 1973, the road was extended northwest 3.4 miles (5.5 km) to Salem Road. On October 21, 1981, the road was extended northwest 4.6 miles (7.4 km). On October 26, 1983, FM 444 was extended northwest 4.0 miles (6.4 km) to US 77.

== FM 445 ==
Farm to Market Road 445
- Location: Victoria County
- Length: 2.382 mi (3.833 km)
- Existed: July 9, 1945–present

Farm to Market Road 445 (FM 445) is located in Victoria County, connecting US 77 to the community of McFaddin. It begins at US 77 and San Antonio River Road (north of its namesake) and travels east. Upon crossing a Union Pacific railroad, the road enters McFaddin and continues past some houses and a post office. It ends at the intersection of McFadden Road and Cusham Road. The road was designated on July 9, 1945, along its current route. However, on May 23, 1951, the FM 445 designation was extended west from US 77 a distance of two miles (3.2 km) bringing the length of the road to about 4.5 miles (7.2 km). The road was truncated to its original and current routing on December 17, 1952.

== FM 446 ==
Farm to Market Road 446
- Location: Victoria County
- Length: 8.930 mi (14.371 km)
- Existed: July 9, 1945–present

Farm to Market Road 446 (FM 446) connects the Victoria area to oil fields southwest of the city. The 8.9-mile-long (14.3 km) highway begins at an intersection with Kemper City Road in a rural area of the county. The area which was once part of multiple oil fields is now made up of brush and a low density of homes. The road heads northeast crossing Boggy Creek and having an intersection with the divided US 59/US 77. As the road gets closer to the city limits, the number of homes that surround the road increases but FM 446 ends at an intersection with US 77 Bus. before reaching the city. The road's designation was applied on July 9, 1945, as a 2.5-mile-long (4.0 km) spur from US 77 (now US 77 Bus.) outside of Victoria. On November 23, 1948, the road was extended southwest 7 miles (11 km) to end at Fleming School; it has not been changed significantly since then.

== FM 447 ==
Farm to Market Road 447
- Location: Victoria County
- Length: 5.404 mi (8.697 km)
- Existed: July 9, 1945–present

Farm to Market Road 447 (FM 447) is a 5.4-mile-long (8.7 km) route in Victoria County that acts as a connector between FM 236 in Mission Valley and US 87 in Nursery. It begins northwest of the city of Victoria and heads northeast. After crossing the Guadalupe River and passing the South Texas Electric Cooperative's Red Gate Power Plant, the road curves to the north before ending at US 87.

FM 447 was designated on July 9, 1945, to run from Lower Mission Valley Road (near the Guadalupe River) to US 87 in Nursery. On November 23, 1948, it was extended 1.4 miles (2.3 km) southwest to Upper Mission Valley Road (later FM 1515, now FM 236).

== FM 448 ==
Farm to Market Road 448
- Location: Fayette and Lee counties
- Length: 13.696 mi (22.042 km)
- Existed: June 11, 1945–present

Farm to Market Road 448 (FM 448) is a 13.7-mile-long (22.0 km) route connecting Winchester in Fayette County with Giddings in Lee County. The road begins in the center of Winchester at an intersection with FM 153. It heads north-northeast out of the community paralleling a Union Pacific railroad. After crossing into Lee County, FM 448 crosses the aforementioned railroad at Northrup and continues heading north further away from the railroad. The road intersects FM 2239 at the latter's eastern terminus before heading back towards the northeast, crossing the railroad again, and entering Giddings city limits. At South Main Street (US 77), FM 448 reaches its northern terminus.

FM 448 was designated on June 11, 1945, running from Northrup to Giddings, and was extended to Winchester on October 31, 1957.

== FM 449 ==
Farm to Market Road 449
- Location: Gregg and Harrison counties
- Length: 22.604 mi (36.378 km)
- Existed: June 11, 1945–present

Farm to Market Road 449 (FM 449) is located in Gregg and Harrison counties, running from US 259 near Judson east to Loop 390 in Marshall.

FM 449 was designated on June 11, 1945, from US 80 in west Marshall west 11.4 miles (18.3 km) to what is now FM 450. On December 2, 1953, it was extended west 4.2 miles (6.8 km). On July 15, 1957, the south end was changed from US 80 to what was then SH 154 (now Loop 390). On December 31, 1959, the section from FM 450 to FM 2208 was transferred to FM 2208. On October 17, 1966, FM 449 extended to US 259, replacing a section of FM 450, a section of FM 2208, and all of FM 2657.

Junction list

County	Location	mi	km	Destinations	Notes
Gregg		0.0	0.0	US 259 – Daingerfield, Longview	
Gregg		1.0	1.6	FM 2751	
Harrison		4.6	7.4	FM 2879	
Harrison		6.5	10.5	FM 2208 south – Longview	West end of FM 2208 overlap
Harrison	Carterville	10.5	16.9	FM 450 – Hallsville	West end of FM 450 overlap
Harrison	Carterville	10.6	17.1	FM 450 north / FM 2208 north – Harleton, Jefferson, Lake O' the Pines	East end of FM 450/FM 2208 overlaps
Harrison	Marshall	22.6	36.4	Loop 390 / Hynson Springs Road – Marshall, Jefferson	
1.000 mi = 1.609 km; 1.000 km = 0.621 mi: Concurrency terminus

== FM 450 ==
Farm to Market Road 450
- Location: Harrison, Marion, and Upshur counties
- Length: 30.289 mi (48.745 km)
- Existed: June 11, 1945–present

Farm to Market Road 450 (FM 450) is a 30.6-mile-long (49.2 km) route that runs through Harrison, Marion, and Upshur counties in northeastern Texas. It begins in western Harrison County at the intersection of FM 968 and FM 2625 (the latter also ends here) and travels north towards Hallsville. Before reaching the city limits, FM 450 interchanges I-20 at its exit 604. Heading north into Hallsville, it intersects US 80 in the center of the city. At Carterville, FM 450 forms a concurrency with FM 449 and FM 2208. The FM 449 concurrency is about 0.1-mile-long (0.16 km) while the FM 2208 concurrency is much longer. The two highways cross the Little Cypress Bayou. Before reaching Harleton, FM 2208 breaks off the concurrency towards the east while FM 450 continues into the community where it reaches SH 154.

In Harleton, FM 450 and SH 154 together head west for 0.2 miles (0.32 km) until FM 450 breaks off to head northwest. This section of the road passes through wooded areas in northwestern Harrison County. The road forms a concurrency with FM 726 just south of the Lake O' the Pines. FM 726 provides access to the southern shoreline of the lake. FM 450 continues northwest where it briefly enters Marion County. Most of the roads that intersect FM 450 provide access to a small community on the lake's western shore. FM 450 heads into Upshur County and shortly thereafter the city of Ore City. The highway ends at an intersection with US 259 and FM 1649.

FM 450 was designated on June 11, 1945, running as a road connecting Harleton to Smyrna, a small settlement located south of the modern-day FM 726 intersection. On November 23, 1948, the road was extended south to Hallsville bringing the length to 13.4 miles (21.6 km). On July 15, 1949, the road was brought north to Ore City partially via what had been Spur 162. The last extension occurred on October 15, 1954, when FM 450 was routed south of Hallsville and assumed its current length. By 2016, FM 450 was rerouted north of FM 449 on a more straighter path; the old routing of FM 450 was removed altogether.

Junction list

County	Location	mi	km	Destinations	Notes
Harrison		0.0	0.0	FM 968 / FM 2625 east – Longview	Western terminus of FM 2625
Harrison		1.6– 1.7	2.6– 2.7	I-20 – Shreveport, Dallas	I-20 exit 604
Harrison	Hallsville	3.8	6.1	US 80 (Main Street) – Longview, Marshall	
Harrison	Carterville	11.7	18.8	FM 449 west / FM 2208 south – Judson, Longview	Southern end of FM 449/FM 2208 concurrencies
Harrison	Carterville	11.8	19.0	FM 449 east – Marshall	Northern end of FM 449 concurrency
Harrison		16.1	25.9	FM 2208 north / Dave Wilson Road – Jefferson	Northern end of FM 2208 concurrency
Harrison	Harleton	17.3	27.8	SH 154 east / North Grand Avenue – Marshall	Southern end of SH 154 concurrency
Harrison	Harleton	17.5	28.2	SH 154 west – Gilmer	Northern end of SH 154 concurrency
Harrison	Harleton	17.7	28.5	FM 1968 north	Southern terminus of FM 1968
Harrison		23.5	37.8	FM 726 east – Lake O' the Pines	Southern end of FM 726 concurrency
Harrison		24.6	39.6	FM 726 west / McCoy Road	Northern end of FM 726 concurrency
Marion	No major junctions				
Upshur	Ore City	30.6	49.2	US 259 / FM 1649 west (Main Street) – Longview, Daingerfield	Eastern terminus of FM 1649
1.000 mi = 1.609 km; 1.000 km = 0.621 mi: Concurrency terminus

== FM 451 ==
Farm to Market Road 451
- Location: Harrison County
- Length: 4.748 mi (7.641 km)
- Existed: June 11, 1945–present

Farm to Market Road 451 (FM 451) is a 4.7-mile-long (7.6 km) route in Harrison County.

The western terminus of FM 451 is in Elysian Fields at FM 31. The route heads east and crosses the West Fork Socagee Creek before reaching its eastern terminus at FM 9. The roadway continues as Don Long Road.

FM 451 was designated on June 11, 1945, from a point 8.8 miles (14.2 km) east of Elysian Fields to US 80 in Waskom. On November 23, 1948, the route was extended west to FM 31 in Elysian Fields. On November 18, 1953, the portion of the road between Don Long Road and Waskom was transferred to FM 9.

== FM 452 ==
Farm to Market Road 452
- Location: Cottle County
- Length: 7.079 mi (11.393 km)
- Existed: July 9, 1945–present

Farm to Market Road 452 (FM 452) is a seven-mile-long (11 km) route in southern Cottle County. Starting at County Road 706, the route heads north for about a mile (1.6 km), curves to the east, then to the north again. At the settlement of Delwin, FM 452 reaches the southern terminus of FM 2278. FM 452 turns to the east and travels for four miles (6.4 km) to end at US 83. The road was designated on July 9, 1945, running only along the east–west portion from Delwin to US 83. On October 31, 1958, the road was extended 2.5 miles (4.0 km) to the south and west to end at its current endpoint.

== FM 453 ==
Farm to Market Road 453
- Location: Wheeler County
- Length: 9.232 mi (14.857 km)
- Existed: July 9, 1945–present

Farm to Market Road 453 (FM 453) is a 9-mile-long (14 km) route in western Wheeler County. Starting at I-40's exit 152 and County Road 6, the highway heads due north through ranch and agricultural lands. Near the southern end, it crosses the North Long Dry Creek. The highway terminates at FM 2473 where it makes a reverse curve. FM 453 was designated on July 9, 1945, running from what was then US 66 (between McLean and Lela) north for 6.2 miles (10.0 km); the remaining three miles (4.8 km) was brought under state maintenance on May 2, 1962.

== FM 454 ==
Farm to Market Road 454
- Location: Rockwall County
- Length: 0.4 mi (640 m)
- Existed: November 29, 1989–present

Farm to Market 454 (FM 454) will be a 0.4-mile-long (0.64 km) route near Rockwall. The road, which will carry the name of Tandem Trail, will travel from SH 276 to FM 551. It was designated on November 29, 1989.

=== FM 454 (1945) ===
Farm to Market Road 454
- Location: Montague County
- Length: 5.0 mi (8.0 km)
- Existed: July 9, 1945–December 17, 1945

The first use of the FM 454 designation was in Montague County, from Bowie southwest for five miles (8.0 km). This designation was cancelled five months later, as the proposed route followed SH 59, in which that portion was designated on January 10, 1945.

=== FM 454 (1951–1964) ===
Farm to Market Road 454
- Location: Yoakum County
- Length: 8.0 mi (12.9 km)
- Existed: May 23, 1951–December 20, 1963

The second iteration of the FM 454 designation was in Yoakum County, from SH 328 (now SH 83) north through Allred and east to SH 214. FM 454 was cancelled on December 20, 1963; the section from SH 214 to FM 1622 was returned to Yoakum County and the section from FM 1622 to SH 83 was transferred to FM 1622.

=== FM 454 (1978–1987) ===
Farm to Market Road 454
- Location: Rusk County
- Length: 7.1 mi (11.4 km)
- Existed: July 24, 1978–September 29, 1987

The third use of the FM 454 was in Rusk County on a loop route from US 259 to US 259 in Henderson. FM 454 was cancelled on September 29, 1987, and transferred to Loop 571.

== FM 455 ==
Farm to Market Road 455
- Location: Montague, Cooke, Wise, Denton, and Collin counties
- Length: 94.746 mi (152.479 km)
- Existed: July 9, 1945–present

Farm to Market Road 455 (FM 455) is a 97.2-mile-long (156.4 km) route in northern Texas that runs through portions of Montague, Cooke, Wise, Denton, and Collin counties. The highway's termini are the intersection of County Road 345 and Woodland School Road about two and a half miles (4.0 km) west of Montague at its west end, and FM 2862 in the eastern reaches of Anna (south of the community of Westminster) at its east end.

FM 455 was originally designated on July 9, 1945, from SH 59 in Montague southeast 4.0 miles (6.4 km). On December 17, 1945, it was extended 3.8 miles (6.1 km) to Mallard. On November 23, 1948, it was extended 7.0 miles (11.3 km) to Forestburg. On July 14, 1949, it was extended southeast 5.3 miles (8.5 km). On November 20, 1951, it was extended southeast to FM 51, replacing FM 1657. On March 15, 1952, FM 455 was extended eastward to a road intersection 3.6 miles (5.8 km) east of U.S. Highway 77 (US 77), replacing FM 425. Part of that road was numbered as FM 1656 earlier. On June 25, 1952, the road was from rerouted on its current route from the Montague/Wise County Line to a road intersection west of Greenwood; part of the old route from west of Greenwood to FM 51 was renumbered as FM 1204. On January 29, 1953 (unnumbered when first designated on December 17, 1952), FM 455 was extended east 3.0 miles (4.8 km) to the end of FM 1829. It replaced FM 1829 from that intersection to what is now US 377, FM 427 from what is now US 377 to FM 543, the section of FM 543 from there to what is now SH 5, and FM 1376 from what is now SH 5 to Westminster. On October 31, 1957, FM 455 was extended east to SH 160 in Desert. On April 29, 1959, the eastern terminus was changed to FM 545. On July 26, 1963, the section from SH 5 to FM 545 was renumbered as FM 2862 and it was extended east to SH 121 on a different route. On June 2, 1967, it was extended east to FM 2862. On November 26, 1969, it was extended southwest 2.5 miles (4.0 km) from SH 59 in Montague. In 1987, Lake Ray Roberts was completed and FM 455 was rerouted over the dam, completing two new routes: FM 1190 (which was designated from FM 455 eastward to the Lake Ray Roberts marina) and FM 1192 (which was designated from the east side of the lake, through Pilot Point to its connection with the original FM 455 at US 377).

== FM 456 ==
Farm to Market Road 456
- Location: Matagorda County
- Length: 2.555 mi (4.112 km)
- Existed: June 25, 1945–present

Farm to Market Road 456 (FM 456) is a 2 1/2-mile-long (4.0 km) route in Matagorda County. The highway starts at SH 71 about 0.65 miles (1.05 km) south of Midfield and travels east past a few ranches. After crossing the Tres Palacios Creek, state maintenance ends at the intersection of Rugeley Road and Dabelgott Road. It was designated on June 25, 1945, along its present route.

== FM 457 ==
Farm to Market Road 457
- Location: Matagorda County
- Length: 27.764 mi (44.682 km)
- Existed: June 25, 1945–present

Farm to Market Road 457 (FM 457) (designated as the Sergeant Joe Parks Jr. Memorial Highway) is located in Matagorda County. The road is 27.8 miles (44.7 km) long and connects Bay City with the coastline of the Gulf of Mexico, specifically the at Matagorda Peninsula. The highway begins at an intersection with SH 35 in the eastern reaches of Bay City and travels east. In the area of Caney, it passes near the Bay City Municipal Airport and intersects FM 2540. It continues east but begins to curve towards the southeast in Cedar Lane where FM 457 then intersects FM 521. After passing Gainesmore, Hawkinsville, and FM 2611 at its western terminus, FM 457 passes through the community of Sargent, crosses the Intracoastal Waterway, and ends on the Matagorda Peninsula not far from a beach on the Gulf of Mexico. The entire highway is also known as the Sergeant Joe Parks, Jr. Memorial Highway.

The highway was created on June 25, 1945, running from Bay City to Gainesmore. On March 20, 1946, the highway was extended to southeast of Sargent bringing the total mileage of the road to 25.8 miles (41.5 km). On December 17, 1952, FM 457 was further extended southeast to the Gulf of Mexico taking over what had been State Highway 330. SH 330 was a 0.1-mile-long (160 m) highway that existed from May 1940 until its absorption by FM 457 and only consisting of the bridge (constructed as a wooden swing bridge at the time) over the Intracoastal Waterway.

From 2018 to 2021, TxDOT built a replacement for the old swing bridge over the Intracoastal Waterway between Sargent and Sargent Beach. The swing bridge was the last of its kind in the entire state. The new corkscrew-style bridge is a fixed concrete span with helix roads on both ends to allow for clearance over the canal and provide uninterrupted access to Sargent Beach.

Junction list

The entire route is in Matagorda County.

Location	mi	km	Destinations	Notes
Bay City	0.0	0.0	SH 35 – Bay City, Angleton	
Caney	5.3	8.5	FM 2540	
Cedar Lane	13.5	21.7	FM 521	
Hawkinsville	19.8	31.9	FM 2611 east	Western terminus of FM 2611
Intracoastal Waterway	27.7	44.6	Sargent Corkscrew Bridge	
	27.8	44.7	County Road 238, Sargent Beach	Eastern terminus of CR 238
1.000 mi = 1.609 km; 1.000 km = 0.621 mi

== FM 458 ==
Farm to Market Road 458
- Location: Matagorda County
- Length: 5.633 mi (9.065 km)
- Existed: June 25, 1945–present

Farm to Market Road 458 (FM 458) is a 5.7-mile-long (9.2 km) route near the western border of Matagorda County. The road's southern terminus is at FM 616 about three miles (4.8 km) west of Blessing while the northern terminus is at SH 111 2.75 miles (4.43 km) west of Midfield. The entire highway is two-lane undivided road that crosses a Union Pacific railroad line at its southern terminus, and then continues through a mix of farm fields and woods with occasional homes. Farther north, the highway heads into open agricultural areas, turning east before a turn back to the north towards its end. The road does not have any other junctions with Texas state roads.

The highway was designated on June 25, 1945, as a three-mile-long (4.8 km) spur from SH 111. On September 21, 1955, the road's southern terminus was extended south to FM 616.

== FM 459 ==
Farm to Market Road 459
- Location: Matagorda County
- Length: 3.137 mi (5.049 km)
- Existed: June 25, 1945–present

Farm to Market Road 459 (FM 459) is a 3.1-mile-long (5.0 km) route in Matagorda County. The road starts at the intersection of Hawley Cemetery Road and SH 35 about two miles (3.2 km) east of Blessing. It heads south for 0.3 miles (0.48 km) following the Tres Palacios Creek until it crosses a Union Pacific railroad and turns to the east paralleling the railroad. After two-thirds mile (1.1 km), the road turns to the south and then returns to an easterly bearing. The road heads through mostly agricultural lands with some houses along the road and the Tidehaven Intermediate School. FM 459 ends at FM 1095 south of Elmaton. It was designated on June 25, 1945.

== FM 460 ==
Farm to Market Road 460
- Location: Kaufman County
- Length: 1.114 mi (1.793 km)
- Existed: September 21, 1955–present

Farm to Market Road 460 (FM 460) is located in Kaufman County, in and around Forney. Known locally as Clements Drive, the road begins at an interchange with US 80 in the northwestern reaches of the city and runs northeast approximately 1.1 miles (1.8 km) to FM 740.

FM 460 was designated on September 21, 1955, on the current route.

=== FM 460 (1945) ===
Farm to Market Road 460
- Location: Matagorda County
- Existed: June 25, 1945–October 15, 1954

The first iteration of FM 460 was designated on June 25, 1945, from SH 35 6 miles (9.7 km) north of Palacios to a point 6 miles (9.7 km) to the east. FM 460 was cancelled on October 15, 1954, and combined with FM 521.

== FM 461 ==
Farm to Market Road 461
- Location: Howard and Glasscock counties
- Length: 15.934 mi (25.643 km)
- Existed: May 23, 1951–present

Farm to Market Road 461 (FM 461) is located in Howard and Glasscock counties. The length of the highway is 16.4 miles (26.4 km) of which 15.9 miles (25.6 km) has its own route; a concurrency with US 87 also occurs along the road. The highway begins at an intersection with FM 818 in rural Howard County southwest of Big Spring. It travels south and heads into Glasscock County. Shortly after the county line, the highway curves to the east and intersects RM 33 in the unincorporated community of Lees. After reentering Howard County, it reaches US 87 and turns north onto the highway. After a one-half-mile-long (0.80 km) concurrency, FM 461 leaves the concurrency and travels east towards Forsan. After traveling along the town's southern border, the highway turns to the south at Rex Avenue. FM 461 ends at FM 821 one mile (1.6 km) to the south of the town.

FM 461 was designated on May 23, 1951, from US 87 southwest to the Glasscock County line. On December 17, 1952, the road was extended to RM 33. It was extended to the west and north to FM 818 on June 1, 1964. The section from US 87 to FM 821 was added on July 14, 1978.

Junction list

County	Location	mi	km	Destinations	Notes
Howard		0.0	0.0	FM 818	
Glasscock	Lees	7.1	11.4	RM 33	
Howard		12.0	19.3	US 87 south – Sterling City	Western end of US 87 concurrency
Howard		12.5	20.1	US 87 north – Big Spring	Eastern end of US 87 concurrency
Howard		16.4	26.4	FM 821	
1.000 mi = 1.609 km; 1.000 km = 0.621 mi: Concurrency terminus

=== FM 461 (1945–1946) ===
Farm to Market Road 461
- Location: Matagorda County
- Existed: June 25, 1945–March 20, 1946

A previous route numbered FM 461 was designated on June 11, 1945, from SH 60 at Wadsworth east for seven miles (11 km). FM 461 was cancelled on March 20, 1946, as a result of a request from the Matagorda County Court and mileage was used by an extension of FM 457.

== FM 462 ==
Farm to Market Road 462
- Location: Frio, Medina, and Bandera counties
- Length: 59.481 mi (95.725 km)
- Existed: July 9, 1945–present

Farm to Market Road 462 (FM 462) is a 60-mile-long (97 km) route in Frio, Medina, and Bandera counties west of San Antonio. The road begins at FM 472 in Bigfoot, Frio County and travels west to Moore where it interchanges I-35. It then starts to curve to the north where it enters Medina County and passes through the community of Yancey where FM 462 shares a concurrency with FM 2200. It continues north to serve the city of Hondo where it has a brief concurrency with US 90. North of the city, FM 462 begins to closely parallel Hondo Creek. Shortly after leaving Medina County for Bandera County, the Hondo Creek heads away from the road and Williams Creek begins to closely parallel the road. FM 462 ends at FM 470 in the community of Tarpley.

FM 462 was created on July 9, 1945, as a road connecting Yancey and Hondo. It was extended north to Tarpley on May 25, 1953, when it took over what was then FM 1888. A southward extension to Moore (at US 81) occurred on October 31, 1957, and the eastward extension at its south end occurred on December 16, 1959, replacing FM 2147.

Junction list

County	Location	mi	km	Destinations	Notes
Frio	Bigfoot	0.0	0.0	FM 472 to SH 173 / FM 140	
Frio		2.6	4.2	FM 3176 north – Devine	Southern terminus of FM 3176
Frio	Moore	7.6	12.2	FM 2779 south – Pearsall	Northern terminus of FM 2779
Frio	Moore	8.4	13.5	I-35 / Frontage Road – Pearsall, Devine	I-35 exit 114
Medina	Yancey	18.6	29.9	FM 2200 south – Devine	Southern end of FM 2200 concurrency
Medina	Yancey	19.2	30.9	FM 2200 north – D'Hanis	Northern end of FM 2200 concurrency
Medina	Hondo	32.7	52.6	FM 1250 west (30th Street) to US 90	Eastern terminus of FM 1250
Medina	Hondo	33.4	53.8	US 90 east (19th Street) / Avenue E – San Antonio	Southern end of US 90 concurrency
Medina	Hondo	33.9	54.6	US 90 west (19th Street) / Avenue M – Uvalde	Northern end of US 90 concurrency
Bandera	Tarpley	60.0	96.6	FM 470 / Thomas Creek Road – Utopia, Bandera	
1.000 mi = 1.609 km; 1.000 km = 0.621 mi: Concurrency terminus

== FM 463 ==
Farm to Market Road 463
- Location: Medina County
- Length: 11.132 mi (Note: The certified length given is shorter than the actual mileage, as the Texas Department of Transportation description of FM 463 considers it to be discontinuous at rather than concurrent with SH 132.) (17.915 km)
- Existed: July 9, 1945–present

Farm to Market Road 463 (FM 463) is located in Medina County southwest of San Antonio. The highway starts at I-35's exit 124 east of Devine and travels west towards the city. Just inside the city limits, FM 463 reaches SH 132 in a cluster of businesses. The two roads form a 0.9-mile-long (1.4 km) concurrency to the northeast until FM 463 breaks off and heads due north through a mix of homes and ranches. About five miles (8.0 km) later, the road takes a right turn to FM 471. After a one-half-mile (0.80 km) concurrency to the north, FM 463 resumes its easterly course before ending at FM 2790. The intersection is located within the city of Lytle and located on the Medina–Atascoa county line.

The highway was designated on July 9, 1945, as a spur road from what was then US 81 (now SH 132) in Devine north for five miles (8.0 km) to Chacon Lake. The east–west portion of the road connecting the northern end to FM 471 was added on December 17, 1952. The portion between FM 471 and FM 2790 was added to the highway on October 31, 1958, and the southern extension to I-35 was added on April 26, 1979.

Junction list

The entire route is in Medina County.

Location	mi	km	Destinations	Notes
	0.0	0.0	I-35 / Bigfoot Road – Pearsall	I-35 exit 124
Devine	1.0	1.6	SH 132 south / Colonial Parkway – Devine	South end of SH 132 overlap
	1.9	3.1	SH 132 north – Natalia	North end of SH 132 overlap
	8.0	12.9	FM 471 south – Natalia	South end of FM 471 overlap
	8.5	13.7	FM 471 north – La Coste	North end of FM 471 overlap
Lytle	12.3	19.8	FM 2790	
1.000 mi = 1.609 km; 1.000 km = 0.621 mi: Concurrency terminus

== FM 464 ==
Farm to Market Road 464
- Location: Guadalupe County
- Length: 1.770 mi (2.849 km)
- Existed: July 9, 1945–present

Farm to Market Road 464 (FM 464) is located in central Guadalupe County. The road begins at an intersection with Dunn Street in the unincorporated community of Nolte. The right of way continues west continued towards the Guadalupe River in the past but is now part of the property of a nearby CMC Steel mill. The two-lane road heads east towards Seguin and at the intersection of FM 1620 (which is its southern terminus), the north side of FM 464 is in the city limits of Seguin. It crosses over I-10 at its exit 605. After passing a large distribution warehouse, the road comes to an end at an intersection with US 90 which also doubles as the western terminus of US 90 Alt. The road was created on July 9, 1945, and has not been changed significantly since its creation.

Junction list

The entire route is in Guadalupe County.

Location	mi	km	Destinations	Notes
Nolte	0.0	0.0	Dunn Street	
Seguin	0.2	0.32	FM 1620 north	Southern terminus of FM 1620
Seguin	0.6– 0.8	0.97– 1.3	I-10 – San Antonio, Houston	I-10 exit 605
Seguin	1.7	2.7	US 90 / US 90 Alt. east – San Antonio, Luling, Gonzales	Western terminus of US 90 Alt.
1.000 mi = 1.609 km; 1.000 km = 0.621 mi

== FM 465 ==
Farm to Market Road 465
- Location: Guadalupe County
- Length: 3.667 mi (5.901 km)
- Existed: July 9, 1945–present

Farm to Market Road 465 (FM 465) is a 3.7-mile-long (6.0 km) route running from I-10/US 90 to FM 78 in Marion. The road begins along Line Road where it has an interchange with I-10 at the latter's exit 599. FM 465 heads north-northwest through mostly rural areas of Guadalupe County before it enters the town limits of Marion at the Marion High School and Marion Middle School campuses. The highway heads north through Marion on South Center Street before ending at a signalized T-intersection with San Antonio Street, FM 78. FM 465 was designated along its current routing in July 1945, though at the time of its creation, it only intersected US 90 as I-10 had not been constructed yet.

== FM 466 ==
Farm to Market Road 466
- Location: Guadalupe and Gonzales counties
- Length: 34.392 mi (55.349 km)
- Existed: July 9, 1945–present

Farm to Market Road 466 (FM 466) is a 34.4-mile-long (55.4 km) route running from US 90 in Seguin to SH 97 in Cost. The highway runs through Guadalupe and Gonzales counties in central Texas. It passes by three historic sites, the El Capote Ranch, the H. Wilson & Company, and the site of the Battle of Gonzales.

== FM 467 ==
Farm to Market Road 467
- Location: Guadalupe County
- Length: 13.269 mi (21.354 km)
- Existed: July 9, 1945–present

Farm to Market Road 467 (FM 467) is a 13.3-mile-long (21.4 km) route in Guadalupe County connecting the cities of New Berlin and Seguin. The road starts at FM 775 in the narrow municipality of New Berlin and heads east-northeast. After intersecting FM 539 at its northern terminus, the road curves more to the northeast. It passes through a mix of ranches and residential properties. As the road enters the Seguin city limits, it intersects SH 46 acting as a bypass of the city. Further into the city, the road reaches the eastern terminus of FM 725 but soon ends itself at an intersection with SH 123 Bus.

The road was designated on July 9, 1945, running from the Elm Creek School southwest of Seguin to its current eastern terminus for a total distance of 5.9 miles (9.5 km). On August 25, 1949, the road was extended 2.7 miles (4.3 km) southwest. It reached its present configuration on November 13, 1954.

== FM 468 ==
Farm to Market Road 468
- Location: Dimmit and La Salle counties
- Length: 21.349 mi (34.358 km)
- Existed: June 25, 1945–present

Farm to Market Road 468 (FM 468) is a 21.3-mile-long (34.3 km) route in Dimmit and La Salle counties. Starting at SH 85 three miles (4.8 km) east of Big Wells, it heads southeast to an intersection with FM 469 outside of Cotulla. After this intersection, the number of commercial business that dot the highway increase until it reaches I-35 at its exit 67. Now within the city limits past the Interstate, FM 468 heads through the city on Leonard Avenue and Leona Street through a residential neighborhood to its end at Main Street (Business Loop I-35).

FM 468 was once much longer that it is now; it included segments east and southeast of Cotulla. At the time of its designation on June 25, 1945, the road included a 2.5-mile (4.0 km) segment running northwest from US 81 (current Bus. I-35) and another segment 8.3-mile-long (13.4 km) southeast of the city running parallel to the Nueces River. On December 16, 1948, FM 468 was extended northwest to Woodward. The road reached its current western terminus at SH 85 on July 31, 1952, by taking over parts of FM 1019 and all of FM 1684, and FM 1684 was reused to replace the old route of FM 468 northwest of US 81 (note that FM 1684 was cancelled and combined with FM 469 on November 16, 1953). The eastern segment was changed often. On December 17, 1952, it was extended along an unconstructed route and what is now FM 469 to SH 97, replacing FM 1342. On July 29, 1953, the section from SH 97 to Los Angeles was renumbered as FM 1919, as the FM 1342 designation was reused on December 17, 1952. The section from Los Angeles westward 8.3 miles (13.4 km) was cancelled and FM 468 was extended southeast 8.0 miles (12.9 km). It was extended southeast 4.0 miles (6.4 km) on September 21, 1955, 0.3 miles (0.48 km) on September 27, 1960. Eastern segment was relocated from US 81 (now Business I-35) on June 25, 1965. At its longest length, FM 468 had a length of 46.8 miles (75.3 km) (both the eastern and western segments) from 1965 to 1976. January 29, 1976, is when the eastern segment was transferred to FM 624 leaving only the SH 85–Cotulla segment intact.

== FM 469 ==
Farm to Market Road 469
- Location: La Salle County
- Length: 47.293 mi (76.111 km)
- Existed: June 25, 1945–present

Farm to Market Road 469 (FM 469) is located in La Salle County. The 48-mile-long (77 km) two-lane road is shaped as a long loop around the north side of Cotulla with inconsistent directional signage throughout. The western terminus of the road is at FM 468 two miles (3.2 km) northwest of Cotulla. It heads northwest first to the community of Woodward before turning to the northeast. In the community of Millett, FM 469 has an interchange with I-35 at its exit 77. Heading in an east-southeast direction, the road reaches the community of Los Angeles, where it crosses SH 97. The road continues south for eight miles (13 km), turns to the west for five miles (8.0 km), and south again for just under three miles (4.8 km) to its western end at FM 624.

At the time of its creation on June 25, 1945, the road was only 4.3-mile-long (6.9 km) and traveled from northeast of Woodward to US 81 in Millett. In the mid 1950s, the road was extended four times: 9.3 miles (15.0 km) to the southeast from Millett on January 29, 1953 (total length 13.6 miles (21.9 km)) (taking over FM 1895), an extension at its west end to FM 468 on October 28, 1953 (taking over FM 1684), to 5.6 miles (9.0 km) from its current terminus on November 13, 1954 (taking over FM 1919), and to its current eastern terminus October 31, 1957.

== FM 470 ==
Farm to Market Road 470
- Location: Bandera County
- Length: 28.656 mi (46.117 km)
- Existed: June 25, 1945–present

Farm to Market Road 470 (FM 470) is a 28.7-mile-long (46.2 km) route located in the southern portion of Bandera County. Starting at RM 187 north of Utopia, the road heads east to Tarpley, where it intersects FM 462. East of Tarpley, the road heads east-northeast. Immediately after crossing the Medina River, FM 470 ends at SH 16 about two miles (3.2 km) west of Bandera.

In June 1945, FM 470 was designated, and consisted of a spur road from SH 16 to Tarpley. The road was extended seven and a half miles (12.1 km) west of Tarpley on February 25, 1949, and another three miles (4.8 km) west over a mountain pass on August 22, 1951. The road was extended to FM 187 (became RM 187 in 1963) on December 17, 1952. The road was Ranch to Market Road 470 (RM 470) in February 1947, but it became an FM by 1948.

== FM 471 ==
Farm to Market Road 471
- Location: Medina and Bexar counties
- Length: 41.1 mi (66.1 km)
- Existed: May 23, 1951–present

Farm to Market Road 471 (FM 471) is a 41.1-mile-long (66.1 km) partial loop around the western suburbs of San Antonio in Medina and Bexar counties. It runs from I-35 near Natalia to Loop 1604 inside the San Antonio city limits. It also travels through Pearson, LaCoste, Castroville (where it forms a brief concurrency with US 90), and Rio Medina.

The highway was created on May 23, 1951, running from US 81 in Natalia to US 90 in Castroville. On January 26, 1953, FM 471 was extended north and east to 5.7 miles (9.2 km) west of SH 16 in Leon Valley, replacing FM 1105. FM 471 was extended east to SH 16 on October 28, 1953. On May 6, 1964, FM 471 was extended southeast to I-35. The northern end was truncated to Loop 1604 by 2018 when the portion of the road between Loop 1604 and the Leon Valley city limits was removed from the state highway system while the portion inside Leon Valley was resigned as Spur 471 when the Project Acceptance Letter for project CSJ 0849-01-047 was sent as part of TxDOT's San Antonio turnback program.

=== FM 471 (1945–1949) ===
Farm to Market Road 471
- Location: Frio County
- Existed: July 9, 1945–August 25, 1949

The first iteration of FM 471 existed from July 9, 1945, to August 1949 in Frio County. For most of its existence, it traveled from SH 84 in Dilley to Divot. On July 22, 1949, the route was extended north from Divot for five miles (8.0 km) to near Batesville, however on August 25, the entire road was transferred to FM 117. Note that this FM 471 (as well as FM 117) was planned as early as March 26, 1942, both to replace part of SH 55, which all of FM 117 was part of.

== FM 472 ==
Farm to Market Road 472
- Location: Frio County
- Length: 16.649 mi (26.794 km)
- Existed: July 9, 1945–present

Farm to Market Road 472 (FM 472) is a 16.6-mile-long (26.7 km) route in eastern Frio County southwest of San Antonio. Starting at Goldfinch Road about thirteen miles (21 km) east of Pearsall, it heads north, intersecting FM 140 and FM 1549, before reaching the community of Bigfoot, where it intersects FM 462. FM 472's northern terminus is near the Medina County line at SH 173.

FM 472 was designated on July 9, 1945, from SH 173 to Bigfoot. On August 22, 1951, FM 472 was extended west to US 81 at Moore. On April 20, 1954, it was routed south to Schattel School and Goldfinch Road over former FM 2147, while the former east–west segment was transferred to FM 2147 (which was transferred to FM 462 on December 16, 1959).

== RM 473 ==
Ranch to Market Road 473
- Location: Kendall and Blanco counties
- Length: 39.733 mi (63.944 km)
- Existed: June 26, 1945 (Note: RM 473 was previously designated as FM 473 from 1945 to 1956.)–present

Ranch to Market Road 473 (RM 473) is located in Kendall and Blanco counties. It runs from SH 27 in Comfort to RM 32 east of Twin Sisters.

== RM 474 ==
Ranch to Market Road 474
- Location: Kendall County
- Length: 15.764 mi (25.370 km)
- Existed: June 26, 1945 (Note: RM 474 was previously designated as FM 474 from 1945 to 1960.)–present

Ranch to Market Road 474 (RM 474) is located in Kendall County, northwest of San Antonio. It begins at an intersection with US 87 Bus. in the city of Boerne. The highway heads northeast along East Blanco Road passing the city hall. Near Boerne High School, RM 474 turns left onto Esser Road and heads out of the city into a rural area. It then travels north and north-northeast over the Guadalupe River before ending at RM 473 about halfway between Sisterdale and Kendalia.

RM 474 was designated on June 26, 1945, as Farm to Market Road 474 (FM 474), running from what was then US 87 in Boerne to the community of Kreutzberg, a highway with a total length of 7.3 miles (11.7 km). On February 25, 1949, the highway was extended three miles (4.8 km) north past the Guadalupe River and was extended to its current terminus on July 14, of the same year at what was then a county road. This road became FM 473 on December 18, 1951. FM 474 was changed to RM 474 in 1960.

== FM 475 ==
Farm to Market Road 475
- Location: Bee County
- Length: 0.436 mi (702 m)
- Existed: October 29, 1992–present

Farm to Market Road 475 (FM 475) is located in Bee County. Located southeast of the city of Beeville, it runs from the northbound US 181 frontage road southeast to the entrance of the McConnell Unit prison. It was designated on October 29, 1992, on its current route.

=== FM/RM 475 (1945) ===
Ranch to Market Road 475
- Location: Bandera, Comal, and Kendall counties
- Existed: June 26, 1945 (Note: RM 475 was previously designated as FM 475 from 1945 to 1960.)–September 28, 1988

FM 475 was first designated on June 26, 1945, running from US 87 in Boerne east to the intersection of US 281 and SH 46 running in Comal and Kendall counties. On July 18, 1951, the road was extended southwest to the Bandera County line, replacing FM 1719 and creating a concurrency with US 87. The road was extended southwest to SH 16 on December 18, 1951. In 1960, FM 475 was redesignated as RM 475. On October 28, 1960, RM 475 was signed, but not designated, as an extension of SH 46. RM 475 was cancelled on September 28, 1988, and replaced by SH 46.

== FM 476 ==
Farm to Market Road 476
- Location: Bexar and Atascosa counties
- Length: 23.718 mi (38.170 km)
- Existed: July 9, 1945–present

Farm to Market Road 476 (FM 476) connects the outskirts of Somerset, Bexar County to Pleasanton, Atascosa County via Poteet. About one-third of the road travels and is signed north and south, this is the portion between FM 2790 and FM 2504. From this point, the road heads generally in an east-southeast direction towards Poteet where it has a concurrency with SH 16 and another concurrency through downtown Poteet with Loop 282. Continuing southwest, FM 476 enters the city of Pleasanton where it intersects Spur 242 and heads south along Bryant Street. It ends at SH 97 southwest of the downtown.

The road was created on July 9, 1945, as a spur road running from Pleasanton running 6.5 miles (10.5 km) towards Poteet. On December 17, 1946, the road was slightly extended to reach Poteet. FM 476 was extended much further west and north to Bexar County near Somerset on May 25, 1953, by taking over the former FM 1100. FM 476 ran through Pleasanton was along what is now Spur 242 and ended at US 281; the routing was changed to Bryant Avenue on July 16, 1965.

A spur of FM 476 existed in Poteet along School Drive from March 21, 1963, to December 30, 1988. This road became the main route of FM 476, while the main route of FM 476 became FM 3498.

Junction list

County	Location	mi	km	Destinations	Notes
Bexar		0.0	0.0	FM 2790 – Lytle, Somerset	
Atascosa		2.1	3.4	FM 3175 west – Lytle	Eastern terminus of FM 3175
Atascosa		9.1	14.6	FM 2504 south – Kyote	Northern terminus of FM 2504
Atascosa		12.2	19.6	FM 1333 south – Charlotte	Northern terminus of FM 1333
Atascosa		14.7	23.7	FM 2146 south	Northern terminus of FM 2146
Atascosa	Poteet	15.6	25.1	SH 16 north – San Antonio	Western end of SH 16 concurrency
Atascosa	Poteet	15.6	25.1	SH 16 south / Loop 282 begins – Jourdanton	Eastern end of SH 16 concurrency; western end of Loop 282 concurrency
Atascosa	Poteet	16.2	26.1	FM 3498 east (School Drive)	Western terminus of FM 3498
Atascosa	Poteet	16.7	26.9	Loop 282 south (4th Street) / Avenue H	Eastern end of Loop 282 concurrency
Atascosa	Poteet	17.2	27.7	FM 1470 north (9th Street) – Leming	Southern terminus of FM 1470
Atascosa	Poteet	17.4	28.0	FM 3498 west (School Drive)	Eastern terminus of FM 3498
Atascosa	Pleasanton	23.8	38.3	Spur 242 east (Bensdale Road) to US 281	Western terminus of Spur 242
Atascosa	Pleasanton	24.8	39.9	FM 3350 (Goodwin Street)	
Atascosa	Pleasanton	24.9	40.1	SH 97 (Oaklawn Road) / Bryant Street	
1.000 mi = 1.609 km; 1.000 km = 0.621 mi: Concurrency terminus

== FM 477 ==
Farm to Market Road 477
- Location: Guadalupe County
- Length: 2.462 mi (3.962 km)
- Existed: September 21, 1955–present

Farm to Market Road 477 (FM 477) is a 2.4-mile-long (3.9 km) route in central Guadalupe County, southeast of the county seat of Seguin. The route connects SH 123 (just south of its intersection with SH 46) with FM 466.

FM 477 was designated on September 21, 1955, on the current route.

=== FM 477 (1945–1953) ===
Farm to Market Road 477
- Location: Atascosa County
- Existed: July 9, 1945–January 29, 1953

The first iteration of FM 477 was designated on July 9, 1945, running from SH 173 (now SH 16) to Christine. FM 477 was cancelled on January 29, 1953, and was transferred to FM 140.

== FM 478 ==
Farm to Market Road 478
- Location: Atascosa and Wilson counties
- Length: 3.563 mi (5.734 km)
- Existed: July 9, 1945–present

Farm to Market Road 478 (FM 478) is located in Atascosa and Wilson counties south of San Antonio. Starting at County Road 753 in Black Hill, a settlement located nine miles (14 km) east of Pleasanton in Atascosa County, the road heads north past ranches. The road makes a reverse curve to the east; at the second curve, FM 478 crosses into Wilson County before ending at SH 97. It was created on July 9, 1945, running along the same route as it does today.

== RM 479 ==
Ranch to Market Road 479
- Location: Kerr and Kimble counties
- Length: 32.346 mi (52.056 km)
- Existed: July 9, 1945 (Note: RM 479 was previously designated as FM 479 from 1945 to 1960.)–present

Ranch to Market Road 479 (RM 479) is a 32-mile-long (51 km) route in Kerr and Kimble counties northwest of San Antonio. Beginning at SH 27 between Mountain Home and Ingram, the road heads north through sparsely populated brush lands. It reaches exit 492 of I-10 three miles (4.8 km) from its southern terminus. After entering Kimble County, RM 479 intersects US 290 and turns to the northwest. After passing the ghost town of Noxville, the road curves to the west and ends at FM 2169.

RM 479 was designated on July 9, 1945 as Farm to Market Road 479 (FM 479), starting out as a nine-mile-long (14 km) road traveling from SH 27 to the Reservation Community. It was extended twice in the 1950s: it was extended to the Kerr–Kimble county line on December 17, 1952, and to US 290 on February 24, 1953, respectively. In 1960, the designation was changed to RM 479. The road was extended northwestward 4.3 miles (6.9 km) on June 30, 1966. It was extended northwest 5.3 miles (8.5 km) on November 3, 1972. It was extended west 3.5 miles (5.6 km) on April 25, 1978. It was extended west 3 miles (4.8 km) to the end of RM 1534 on September 26, 1979. On December 8, 1981, RM 479 took over the entire length of RM 1534.

Junction list

County	Location	mi	km	Destinations	Notes
Kerr		0.0	0.0	SH 27 – Kerrville, Mountain Home	
Kerr		3.4	5.5	I-10 – Junction, Kerrville	I-10 exit 492
Kimble		11.6	18.7	US 290 – Junction, Harper	
Kimble		32.3	52.0	FM 2169 – Junction	
1.000 mi = 1.609 km; 1.000 km = 0.621 mi

== RM 480 ==
Ranch to Market Road 480
- Location: Kerr County
- Length: 6.409 mi (10.314 km)
- Existed: July 9, 1945 (Note: RM 480 was previously designated as FM 480 from 1945 to 1960.)–present

Ranch to Market Road 480 (RM 480) is a 6-mile-long (9.7 km) route located in Kerr County. Its southern terminus is at SH 173 in Camp Verde. It runs to the northeast, paralleling Verde Creek for about 4.5 miles (7.2 km). After breaking away from the creek, RM 480 turns north to Center Point, where it intersects FM 1350 before crossing the Guadalupe River and reaching its northern terminus at SH 27.

RM 480 was designated on July 9, 1945 as Farm to Market Road 480 (FM 480), along the current route. The route was changed to RM 480 in 1960.

== FM 481 ==
Farm to Market Road 481
- Location: Maverick, Zavala, Uvalde counties
- Length: 43.336 mi (69.743 km)
- Existed: May 23, 1951–present

Farm to Market Road 481 (FM 481) is a 43.3-mile-long (69.7 km) route in Maverick, Zavala, and Uvalde counties. Its southern terminus is at an intersection with US 57 in Maverick County. It travels to the northeast and clips the northwestern corner of Zavala County before entering Uvalde County, where it crosses the Nueces River and passes the Uvalde National Fish Hatchery. FM 481 ends at US 90 at the city limits of Uvalde.

FM 481 was designated on May 23, 1951, running from US 90 to the southwest for a distance of 6.3 miles (10.1 km). It was extended to the southwest several times: by 1.2 miles (1.9 km) on December 17, 1952; by 1.5 miles (2.4 km) on September 5, 1973; 3.0 miles (4.8 km) on March 31, 1976; and by 3.0 miles (4.8 km) on June 30, 1976, to the Uvalde–Zavala county line. On July 8, 1983, FM 481 was extended over the former FM 3078 to its current southern terminus at US 57.

=== FM 481 (1945) ===
Farm to Market Road 481
- Location: Kerr County
- Length: 6.3 mi (10.1 km)
- Existed: July 9, 1945–June 4, 1946

The original FM 481 was designated on July 9, 1945, in Kerr County. It ran from SH 16 to the Camp Verde–Kerrville Road, a distance of 6.3 miles (10.1 km). It was deleted on June 4, 1946, with its mileage transferred to the original FM 689 (later SH 173). Some highway documents refer to this as Ranch to Market Road 481 (RM 481), probably in error.

== FM 482 ==
Farm to Market Road 482
- Location: Comal County
- Length: 7.568 mi (12.180 km)
- Existed: July 9, 1945–present

Farm to Market Road 482 (FM 482) is a 7.5-mile-long (12.1 km) route located in Comal County. Running as an east–west road between the cities of Schertz and New Braunfels, the road generally parallels I-35 between its exits 177 and 184. It begins at the northbound I-35 frontage road at exit 177 and heads to the north. At FM 2252, the road turns to become more parallel to the Interstate and heads through more rural areas of the city. FM 482 exits the city limits of Schertz and begins to skirt around the limits of New Braunfels as it passes near housing developments, trailer parks, and an apartment complex. Around the settlement of Solms, FM 482 merges with the route of former US 81. It ends fully inside the city limits of New Braunfels at the southbound frontage road to I-35 about one mile (1.6 km) later. The road was created on July 9, 1945, from the vicinity of its western terminus to US 81 in Solms. When US 81 was relocated to what is now the right-of-way of I-35 on October 30, 1957, FM 482 was extended another mile to its current eastern terminus.

== FM 483 ==
Farm to Market Road 483
- Location: Comal County
- Length: 0.962 mi (1,548 m)
- Existed: July 9, 1945–May 27, 2010

Farm to Market Road 483 (FM 483) was located northeast of downtown New Braunfels. It was designated on July 9, 1945, from US 81 to San Geronimo School. Upon the construction and designation of newer roads, FM 483 would run between the northbound frontage road of I-35 and FM 1101. Around 2006, construction began on the New Braunfels Town Center at Creekside shopping center, which led to the truncation of FM 483 at an access road through the center. Due to the extension of nearby FM 306 from I-35 to FM 1101, FM 483 was cancelled on May 27, 2010. Street signs still say "FM 483".

== RM 484 ==
Ranch to Market Road 484
- Location: Comal County
- Length: 2.980 mi (4.796 km)
- Existed: July 9, 1945 (Note: RM 484 was previously designated as FM 484 from 1945 to 1984.)–present

Farm to Market Road 484 (RM 484) is a 3-mile-long (4.8 km) route in northern Comal County, connecting FM 306 in Canyon Lake to RM 32 in the community of Fischer. From its southern terminus, the two-lane road heads north to an intersection with RM 32. RM 484 continues north of there to head through the center of Fischer passing a general store and post office. It then ends at RM 32 where the road itself continues south as Cranes Mill Road.

RM 484 was designated on July 9, 1945, as Farm to Market Road 484 (FM 484), a spur from RM 32 south towards the area of where the lake is now. On June 1, 1966, FM 484 was extended another 0.1-mile (0.16 km) to an Army Corps of Engineers road (now FM 306). In 1984 or later, the designation was changed to RM 484.

== FM 485 ==
Farm to Market Road 485
- Location: Bell, Milam, and Robertson counties
- Length: 38.546 mi (62.034 km)
- Existed: July 12, 1945–present

Farm to Market Road 485 (FM 485) is a 38.5-mile-long (62.0 km) route in Bell, Milam, and Robertson counties in central Texas. Starting at SH 53 near Zabcikville, the road heads east, southeast, and east again through mostly agricultural lands passing small settlements along the way. About two-fifths of the trip in, it intersects US 77. The road heads through areas of again farmland but the density of woods increases as it approaches the Brazos River. FM 485 crosses the river, has a short concurrency with FM 1644, and enters the city limits of Hearne. After passing through some residential neighborhoods of the northern reaches of the city, FM 485 ends at an intersection with US 79 and SH 6.

The road was created on July 12, 1945, running from Yarrellton (the location of the modern-day FM 1915) to Splawn at US 77 and then-US 190. On November 20, 1951, the FM 485 was extended south from Yarrellton to Buckholts at US 190. A 3.2-mile (5.1 km) extension of the road southwest of Buckholt occurred on October 31, 1958, but was truncated by one mile (1.6 km) on January 31, 1961. On October 3, 1966, the portion of the road from Buckholt to Yarrellton was redesignated FM 1915 while FM 485 took over the route of part of FM 2269. On March 31, 1975, US 190 was moved to a routing further south between Cameron and Hearne; FM 485 took over the route of US 190 between US 77 and US 79 at that time.

Junction list

County	Location	mi	km	Destinations	Notes
Bell	Zabcikville	0.0	0.0	SH 53 – Temple, Rosebud	
Bell		0.7	1.1	FM 964 west – Cyclone	Eastern terminus of FM 964
Bell		2.8	4.5	FM 1671 east – Wilson	Western terminus of FM 1671
Bell		3.6	5.8	FM 940 west – Meeks	Eastern terminus of FM 940
Milam	Yarrellton	8.3	13.4	FM 1915 south – Buckholts	Northern terminus of FM 1915
Milam	Yarrellton	8.6	13.8	FM 2269 south – Cameron	Northern terminus of FM 2269
Milam	Splawn	14.5	23.3	US 77 – Rosebud, Cameron	
Milam	Belmena	20.4	32.8	FM 979 north – Calvert	Southern terminus of FM 979
Robertson		34.1	54.9	FM 1644 south	Western end of FM 1644 concurrency
Robertson		34.6	55.7	FM 1644 north – Calvert	Eastern end of FM 1644 concurrency
Robertson	Hearne	38.5	62.0	US 79 / SH 6 – Calvert, Hearne	
1.000 mi = 1.609 km; 1.000 km = 0.621 mi: Concurrency terminus

== FM 486 ==
Farm to Market Road 486
- Location: Milam and Williamson counties
- Length: 29.408 mi (47.328 km)
- Existed: July 12, 1945–present

Farm to Market Road 486 (FM 486) is a 29.4-mile-long (47.3 km) route that runs mostly in Milam County with a small portion near its southern terminus being in Williamson County. From its south end at FM 112 in the community of Shiloh, the road heads north crossing into Milam County about three miles (4.8 km) into its journey. In the city of Thorndale, FM 486 crosses US 79. four and a half miles (7.2 km) north of Thorndale, FM 486 crosses three farm to market roads (908, 1331, and 3061) at their termini and crosses the San Gabriel River in the community of San Gabriel. Heading east then north through agricultural lands, the road intersects FM 487 and the Little River. As the road approaches the community of Pettibone, the road briefly heads east to parallel a BNSF railroad, turns north to cross the railroad, and ends at US 190 and SH 36.

FM 486 was created on July 12, 1945, running from Thorndale to San Gabriel. On November 23, 1948, the road was extended north to Pettibone at US 190. The next extension occurred on October 31, 1957, was when it was extended 4.7 miles (7.6 km) south from Thorndale to Conoley Church. On November 24, 1959, the road was extended south to Shiloh.

== FM 487 ==
Farm to Market Road 487
- Location: Williamson, Bell, and Milam counties
- Length: 60.791 mi (97.834 km)
- Existed: July 12, 1945–present

Farm to Market Road 487 (FM 487) is a 61.1-mile-long (98.3 km) route located in Williamson, Bell, and Milam counties in central Texas. The route's western terminus is at SH 195 in Florence. It travels east to Jarrell where there is a discontinuity of the road at I-35. After resuming on the other side of I-35, it continues to the east through Bartlett but then curves towards the south before entering Rockdale. In Rockdale, there is a short concurrency with US 79. It then ends south of Rockdale at an intersection with US 77.

FM 487 was designated on July 12, 1945, from Rockdale to Tracy. On May 23, 1951, it was extended west to Sharp. On December 17, 1952, it was extended west to Davilla. On October 26, 1954, it was extended west to FM 1236 at the Bell County line. On January 6, 1955, FM 1236 was canceled and combined, bringing the road to its current western terminus. Note that part of FM 1236 was previously FM 1329. On June 1, 1960, it was extended south along the old route of US 77 to US 79. On November 1, 1962, it was extended further east along US 79 and further south along the old route of US 77, bringing the road to its current eastern terminus. On August 31, 1965, it was relocated in Jarrell along a different route and I-35. On December 12, 2019, the highway was relocated along Bud Stockton Loop; the old route east to I-35 was given to the city of Jarrell.

Junction list

County	Location	mi	km	Destinations	Notes
Williamson	Florence	0.0	0.0	SH 195 (Patterson Avenue) – Fort Cavazos, Georgetown	Western terminus
Williamson		3.1	5.0	FM 2483 – Salado	
Williamson	Jarrell	13.1	21.1	I-35 – Austin, Waco	Discontinuous at I-35
Bell		17.5	28.2	FM 2115 – Salado	
Williamson	Schwertner	19.8	31.9	FM 1105 – Weir	
Bell	Bartlett	25.4	40.9	SH 95 (Dalton Street) – Taylor, Temple	
Milam	Davilla	36.1	58.1	FM 437 – Rogers	
Milam		41.3	66.5	FM 3061 – Thorndale	
Milam		45.7	73.5	FM 486 – Thorndale, Pettibone	
Milam		49.6	79.8	FM 1600 – Cameron	
Milam		55.4	89.2	FM 1712 – Minerva	
Milam	Rockdale	57.4	92.4	US 79 north (East Cameron Avenue) – Hearne	West end of US 79 overlap
Milam	Rockdale	57.4	92.4	FM 908 (North Main Street) – Thorndale	
Milam	Rockdale	57.8	93.0	US 79 south (West Cameron Avenue) – Thorndale	East end of US 79 overlap
Milam		61.1	98.3	US 77 – Giddings, Cameron	Eastern terminus
1.000 mi = 1.609 km; 1.000 km = 0.621 mi: Concurrency terminus

== FM 488 ==
Farm to Market Road 488
- Location: Freestone County
- Length: 18.209 mi (29.305 km)
- Existed: July 9, 1945–present

Farm to Market Road 488 (FM 488) is 18.2 miles (29.3 km) in length and is located in Freestone County. The road begins at US 84 (East Commerce Street) east of downtown Fairfield (but still within the city limits) and travels east and northeast along Main Street. Northeast of the city limits, FM 488 curves more to the north at an intersection where FM 2570 heads off to the north-northeast. The road passes a railroad balloon loop which provides an unloading point for coal to the Big Brown Coal Plant and FM 833. It also passes the Freestone Energy Center (a natural gas-powered generating station) and FM 1124. After the road's intersection with FM 417's eastern terminus, the road descends in elevation to travel along the bottom of the dam restraining the Richland-Chambers Reservoir. After a bridge that spans the Richland Creek (immediately downstream of the dam), FM 488 ends at an intersection with US 287. The route of the highway at the time of its designation on July 9, 1945, consisted of a spur road from Fairfield north for about 14.0 miles (22.5 km). It was extended north to US 287 on February 27, 1948.

== FM 489 ==
Farm to Market Road 489
- Location: Limestone and Freestone counties
- Length: 32.806 mi (52.796 km)
- Existed: July 9, 1945–present

Farm to Market Road 489 (FM 489) is a 33-mile-long (53 km) route in Limestone and Freestone counties. Starting at SH 164 near Personville, the road travels northeast through Limestone County for about one-half mile (0.80 km) before heading east through Freestone County for the rest of its route. In the settlement of Freestone, FM 489 shares a 0.4-mile (0.64 km) concurrency with FM 80. Heading through Dew, the road passes over I-45 without an interchange but intersects SH 179 and SH 75 (the former providing access to the Interstate). Heading past Lanely where it intersects FM 1848, FM 489 begins to curve to the north and intersects US 84 in the settlement of Red Lake. The highway continues northwest of the U.S. Highway for just under two miles (3.2 km) but curves to the northeast past that point. It ends at the intersection of County Roads 240, 241, and 271.

When the road was created on July 9, 1945, it traveled a distance of 4.5 miles (7.2 km) from Dew toward the vicinity of Oakwood in Leon County. On May 31, 1955, FM 1368 and FM 1915 were combined into portions of FM 489 such that it now ran from SH 164 to Lanely. On December 10, 1956, FM 489 took over the routing of FM 1980 to bring the eastern terminus of the route to US 84 (the connecting section was designated on November 21). The last extension north of US 84 occurred on September 27, 1960, with FM 489 being routed over previously unnumbered roads.

== FM 490 ==
Farm to Market Road 490
- Location: Starr, Hidalgo, and Willacy counties
- Length: 66.829 mi (107.551 km)
- Existed: June 26, 1945–present

Farm to Market Road 490 (FM 490) is a 69-mile-long (111 km) route in Starr, Hidalgo, and Willacy counties. Beginning at FM 755 between Rio Grande City and La Gloria, the road heads east through a rural area comprising farm lands and oil wells. The road eventually leaves Starr County for Hidalgo and comes to the community of McCook where some small businesses, homes, and churches are found. In this town, a two-mile-long (3.2 km) concurrency begins with FM 681. In the vicinity of the road's interchange with I-69C/US 281, it briefly enters the Edinburg city limits and passes the entrance to South Texas International Airport at Edinburg. East of here, the road begins to make successive 90-degree bends but still maintains an overall heading of east. FM 490 then passes through Hargill, where it intersects FM 493.

The remainder of the road through Willacy County passes mainly through unincorporated rural areas no passing through any settlements, though it does pass near Lasara at its intersection with FM 1015. It also passes near Raymondville where it crosses US 77 Bus. Surrounding this intersection are some large stores and housing complexes. East of this intersection, FM 490 has an interchange with I-69E and US 77. Ten miles (16 km) later, the road ends at FM 1420 near the settlement of Willamar.

FM 490 was created on June 26, 1945, running from its intersection with US 281 to the Hidalgo–Willacy county line. On November 11, 1948, it was slightly extended east to FM 88. The next extension occurred on January 20, 1958, when it was extended over the entire length of FM 2059 to end at FM 681. On February 15, 1958, FM 490 was extended over FM 1561 to end at FM 755. FM 490 was extended east from FM 88 to FM 1015 on May 6, 1964, and to FM 2099 on June 1 of that year, over the entire length of FM 1432. The eastward extension to FM 1420 occurred on June 1, 1965.

Junction list

County	Location	mi	km	Destinations	Notes
Starr		0.0	0.0	FM 755 – Rio Grande City, La Gloria	
Starr		9.2	14.8	FM 2844 north / Pipeline Road	Southern terminus of FM 2844
Hidalgo	McCook	18.8	30.3	FM 681 north / FM 2058 south – La Gloria	Western end of FM 681 concurrency; northern terminus of FM 2058
Hidalgo		21.1	34.0	FM 681 south / CR 3198 – Mission	Eastern end of FM 681 concurrency
Hidalgo	Edinburg	35.0– 35.1	56.3– 56.5	I-69C south / US 281 – Falfurrias, Edinburg	Interchange; temporary northern terminus of I-69C; I-69C exit 17
Hidalgo	Hargill	43.0	69.2	FM 493	
Willacy		47.9	77.1	FM 88 – Raymondville, Weslaco	
Willacy		50.4	81.1	FM 1015 – Lasara, Edcouch	
Willacy		53.6	86.3	FM 1425	
Willacy		55.7	89.6	FM 2845 south / CR 155	Northern terminus of FM 2845
Willacy		56.7	91.2	FM 1834 north / CR 180	Southern terminus of FM 1834
Willacy		58.3	93.8	Bus. US 77 – Raymondville, Lyford	
Willacy		58.8– 58.9	94.6– 94.8	I-69E / US 77	I-69E exit 45
Willacy		63.2	101.7	FM 2099	
Willacy	Willamar	68.8	110.7	FM 1420	
1.000 mi = 1.609 km; 1.000 km = 0.621 mi: Concurrency terminus

== FM 491 ==
Farm to Market Road 491
- Location: Hidalgo and Willacy counties
- Length: 30.518 mi (49.114 km)
- Existed: June 26, 1945–present

Farm to Market Road 491 (FM 491) is a 31-mile-long (50 km) route in Hidalgo and Willacy counties in the southernmost portion of Texas. It runs between Relampago and US 281 (one and a half miles (2.4 km) from the Mexico–United States border) and US 77 Bus. just south of Lyford. It begins heading north from US 281 through agricultural lands. Upon entering the city of Mercedes, it forms a 0.7-mile-long (1.1 km) concurrency with US 83 Bus. west through the city's downtown. After the concurrency, the road heads north where it has an interchange with I-2 and US 83. Passing through residential neighborhoods of northern Mercedes, Indian Hills, and Laguna Seca, the road continues north with some curves around canals that line the area. In the city of La Villa, FM 491 intersects SH 107 in the city center. North of this city, the road make numerous 90-degree bends as it finishes its trip through Hidalgo County and starts traveling through Willacy County. After intersecting numerous farm to market roads, the road ends at US 77 Bus. immediately adjacent to a Union Pacific railroad.

The road was designated on June 26, 1945, to run between SH 107 in La Villa and US 77 (now the highway's business route). It was extended south to US 83 in Mercedes on May 23, 1951. It was extended south to US 281 on July 16, 1951, replacing FM 1428. FM 491 was routed through Mercedes on 10th Street and Texas Avenue; a spur to US 83 via Mistletoe Avenue was added on November 20, 1951. The routing through the city was changed on March 27, 1952, by removing the portion of 10th Street and Texas Avenue south of US 83 (part of its business route today) and routing the mainline via the spur road.

Junction list

County	Location	mi	km	Destinations	Notes
Hidalgo	Relampago	0.0	0.0	US 281 – Brownsville, Pharr, International Bridge	
Hidalgo	Mercedes	4.6	7.4	Bus. US 83 east (2nd Street) / Liberty Street – Harlingen	Southern end of US 83 Bus. concurrency
Hidalgo	Mercedes	5.3	8.5	Bus. US 83 west (2nd Street) / South Texas Avenue – Weslaco	Northern end of US 83 Bus. concurrency
Hidalgo	Mercedes	5.7	9.2	I-2 / US 83 – Harlingen, Weslaco	I-2 exit 163B
Hidalgo	La Villa	16.3	26.2	SH 107 – Edcouch, Santa Rosa	
Hidalgo	La Villa	17.7	28.5	FM 1925 west	Eastern terminus of FM 1925
Hidalgo		21.5	34.6	FM 2629 east	Western terminus of FM 1925
Hidalgo		24.6	39.6	FM 1422 west	Eastern terminus of FM 1422
Willacy		26.5	42.6	FM 1425	
Willacy		28.8	46.3	FM 2845	
Willacy		31.2	50.2	Bus. US 77	
1.000 mi = 1.609 km; 1.000 km = 0.621 mi: Concurrency terminus

== FM 492 ==
Farm to Market Road 492
- Location: Hidalgo County
- Length: 7.488 mi (12.051 km)
- Existed: June 26, 1945–present

Farm to Market Road 492 (FM 492) is a 7.5-mile-long (12.1 km) route located in Hidalgo County. The highway begins at an intersection with Goodwin Road and US 83 Bus. in the city of Palmview. It heads north along Goodwin Road and after intersecting the frontage roads of Interstate 2/US 83, the highway exits the city limits of Palmview and jogs to the right at Three Mile Road and FM 1924 before traveling north again on Doffing Road. It intersects FM 676 at the latter's western terminus before FM 492 terminates at FM 2221 (Mile 7 Road).

The highway was created on June 26, 1945, running from what is still its southern terminus (though the intersecting highway was mainline US 83 at the time) north for three miles (4.8 km) to Three Mile Road. On May 23, 1951, the road was extended north to its current northern terminus and then east along current FM 2221 to FM 681. On January 7, 1987, the east–west portion between FM 2221 and FM 681 was transferred to FM 2221 leaving FM 492 on its current routing. The section of FM 492 south of FM 1924 was redesignated Urban Road 492 (UR 492) on June 27, 1995. The designation of that segment reverted to FM 492 with the elimination of the Urban Road system on November 15, 2018.

== FM 493 ==
Farm to Market Road 493
- Location: Hidalgo County
- Length: 29.811 mi (47.976 km)
- Existed: June 26, 1945–present

Farm to Market Road 493 (FM 493) is 30 miles (48 km) in length and is located in Hidalgo County. Its southern terminus is at the Donna Texas Port of Entry, which provides access to the Donna–Río Bravo International Bridge. Starting out as a four-lane divided highway, the road heads east then turns to the north intersecting US 281. North of here, the road narrows to two lanes and travels through agricultural land. Before entering the city of Donna, the number of residential complexes surrounding the road increases. Inside the city, the road widens to four lanes again (but undivided) surrounded by residential neighborhoods. After crossing US 83 Bus., the road heads through a commercial district in the city. North of its interchange with I-2 and US 83, the road remains four lanes wide and passes through a mix of residences and farm lane. The road narrows to two lanes before curving to due north.

In the census designated place of La Blanca, the road crosses SH 107. The mix of houses and farms is still present as the road passes FM 1925 and has a short concurrency with FM 2812. Residences dwindle north of the concurrency except when FM 493 reaches the community of Hargill where it intersects FM 490 in the town center. The road comes to an end at SH 186 near tracts of the Lower Rio Grande Valley National Wildlife Refuge and the Willacy County line.

FM 493 was created on June 26, 1945, as a road connecting Donna with Run School, about seven and a half miles (12.1 km) south of the city. On December 14, 1956, the road was expanded northward on a new alignment of the road to US 83. On January 21, 1957, the road was extended northward to Hargill at FM 490, replacing FM 890. A 3.4-mile (5.5 km) extension of the road to SH 186 north of Hargill occurred on September 27, 1960.

Junction list

The entire route is in Hidalgo County.

Location	mi	km	Destinations	Notes
	0.0	0.0	Donna–Río Bravo International Bridge – Río Bravo, Mexico	
	0.8	1.3	US 281 – Brownsville, Pharr	
Donna	7.3	11.7	Bus. US 83	
Donna	8.0– 8.1	12.9– 13.0	I-2 / US 83	I-2 exit 155A
La Blanca	15.9	25.6	SH 107 – Elsa, Edinburg	
	17.7	28.5	FM 1925	
	20.8	33.5	FM 2812 west / CR 7060	Southern end of FM 2812 concurrency
	21.3	34.3	FM 2812 east / Mile 21 1/2 N	Northern end of FM 2812 concurrency
Hargill	26.4	42.5	FM 490	
	29.9	48.1	SH 186 – San Manuel, Raymondville	
1.000 mi = 1.609 km; 1.000 km = 0.621 mi: Concurrency terminus

== FM 494 ==
Farm to Market Road 494
- Location: Hidalgo County
- Length: 15.385 mi (24.760 km)
- Existed: June 26, 1945–present

Farm to Market Road 494 (FM 494) is a 15.3-mile-long (24.6 km) route in Hidalgo County. The road begins at FM 1016 in Mission, about 0.3 miles (0.48 km) from the Rio Grande and the Mexico–United States border. FM 494 begins heading southeast paralleling a Rio Valley Switching Company railroad before it crosses the railroad and continues to the southeast. After passing under FM 396 and the Anzalduas International Bridge, FM 494 enters the city limits of Granjeno before curving to the north and passing through a small portion of McAllen and back into Mission. It intersects FM 1016 again before continuing north on Shary Road through Mission. In Mission, there are intersections with I-2/US 83's frontage roads, US 83 Bus., and SH 495. North of Mission, the highway passes through the city of Palmhurst where it intersects FM 1924. It also briefly follows the eastern border of Alton in the vicinity of FM 676. FM 494 ends at SH 107.

The highway was designated on June 26, 1945, as a 3.5-mile-long (5.6 km) spur south from SH 107. On April 20, 1954, the road was extended further south to Mission at what was then US 83 (now US 83 Bus.) for a total length of 7.4 miles (11.9 km) and further extended to FM 1016 (the current easternmost intersection with FM 1016) on December 14, 1956. The loop through Granjeno was added on July 11, 1968. Except for a small extension at its southern end (western intersection with FM 1016) in 1985, the highway has not had any major changes since then. On June 27, 1995, the route was redesignated Urban Road 494 (UR 494). The designation reverted to FM 494 with the elimination of the Urban Road system on November 15, 2018.

== FM 495 ==
Farm to Market Road 495
- Location: Hidalgo County
- Length: 16.570 mi (26.667 km)
- Existed: June 26, 1945–June 22, 2001

Farm to Market Road 495 (FM 495) is the former designation of SH 495 in Hidalgo County.

== FM 496 ==
Farm to Market Road 496
- Location: Zapata County
- Length: 3.022 mi (4.863 km)
- Existed: July 9, 1945–present

Farm to Market Road 496 (FM 496) is a 3-mile-long (4.8 km) route in Zapata County near the Rio Grande and Mexican border. Beginning near the river bank, it heads northeast first past FM 3074, which leads the community of Falcon Mesa. FM 496 continues northeast past some light industrial businesses and a cemetery. At this point, the two-lane road enters the community of Zapata and expands to four-lanes wide. FM 496 travels for three blocks before ending at an intersection with US 83. The roadway past this point continues as SH 16.

FM 496 was designated on July 9, 1945, along its current route and what is now SH 16 to the Zapata–Jim Hogg County line. On August 13, 1945, the road was extended to Hebbronville, and it was further extended to Freer on October 31, 1957, reaching a total length of 92 miles (148 km). FM 496 was shortened to its present length on September 31, 1965, when SH 16 was extended from San Antonio via Freer to Zapata.

== FM 497 ==
Farm to Market Road 497
- Location: Willacy County
- Length: 15.8 mi (25.4 km)
- Existed: July 9, 1945–August 29, 1990

Farm to Market Road 497 (FM 497) was located in Willacy County and connected San Perlita to the Red Fish Bay at Port Mansfield. The highway started in downtown San Perlita when it was designated on July 9, 1945, but its western starting point was moved to south of the city on November 23, 1948. On May 31, 1973, FM 497 was signed (but not designated) as SH 186. This 15.8-mile-long (25.4 km) alignment of the road lasted until August 29, 1990, when it was officially designated as SH 186.

== FM 498 ==
Farm to Market Road 498
- Location: Willacy County
- Length: 11.870 mi (19.103 km)
- Existed: July 9, 1945–present

Farm to Market Road 498 (FM 498) is a 11.8-mile-long (19.0 km) route in southern Willacy County. It runs from the intersection of Olive Road and Bus. US 77 in Lyford east through the county before ending at FM 1420 in Willamar. It has an interchange with I-69E/US 77 just southeast of downtown Lyford.

FM 498 was designated on July 9, 1945, along the current route.

Junction list

The entire route is in Willacy County.

Location	mi	km	Destinations	Notes
Lyford	0.0	0.0	Bus. US 77 / CR 4208 (Olive Road)	
Lyford	0.3– 0.4	0.48– 0.64	I-69E / US 77	I-69E exit 42A
	4.4	7.1	FM 2099 south / CR 345 (Live Oak Road)	Western end of FM 2099 concurrency
	5.1	8.2	FM 2099 north	Eastern end of FM 2099 concurrency
	7.3	11.7	FM 507 south / CR 395	Northern terminus of FM 507
Willamar	11.8	19.0	FM 1420	Eastern end of FM 2099 concurrency
1.000 mi = 1.609 km; 1.000 km = 0.621 mi: Concurrency terminus

== FM 499 ==
Farm to Market Road 499
- Location: Hunt and Hopkins counties
- Length: 12.956 mi (20.851 km)
- Existed: January 23, 1953–present

Farm to Market Road 499 (FM 499) is located in Hunt and Hopkins counties. It runs from Spur 302 in Greenville to I-30 near Cumby. There are concurrencies with SH 24 and I-30's frontage road. In addition to Greenville, the highway passes through the towns of Campbell and Cumby.

FM 499 was designated on January 23, 1953, from US 67, 0.7 miles (1.1 km) east of Greenville east to US 67 east of Cumby on a former routing of US 67. On May 15, 1965, the route was modified due to various highway number changes and a section of FM 499 from former FM 819 southwest for 1.7 miles (2.7 km) was transferred to SH 50. FM 819 was also cancelled and transferred to SH 50.

Junction list

County	Location	mi	km	Destinations	Notes
Hunt	Greenville	0.0	0.0	Spur 302 (Lee Street)	
Hunt	Campbell	5.3	8.5	SH 24 south – Greenville	West end of SH 24 overlap
Hunt	Campbell	7.2	11.6	SH 24 north – Commerce, Paris	East end of SH 24 overlap
Hunt	Campbell	7.8	12.6	FM 513 (Patterson Street) – Lone Oak	
Hunt		12.5	20.1	FM 1568 north – Commerce	
Hopkins	Cumby	14.4	23.2	FM 275 north (Commerce Street)	West end of FM 275 overlap
Hopkins	Cumby	14.6	23.5	FM 275 south (Frisco Street)	East end of FM 275 overlap
Hopkins		16.6	26.7	I-30 / US 67 – Greenville, Sulphur Springs	Interchange; I-30 exit 112
1.000 mi = 1.609 km; 1.000 km = 0.621 mi: Concurrency terminus

=== FM 499 (1945) ===
Farm to Market Road 499
- Location: San Saba County
- Existed: July 13, 1945–December 13, 1951

The first iteration of FM 499 was designated on July 13, 1945, from US 190, 3.5 miles (5.6 km) east of San Saba to a point 7.5 miles (12.1 km) to the southeast to Colony School Road, in San Saba County. FM 499 was cancelled on December 13, 1951, and combined with FM 580.
