= Blaize Clement =

American novelist

- Born: August 18, 1932; Fink, Texas, U.S.
- Died: July 20, 2011 (aged 78); Sarasota, Florida, U.S.
- Occupation: Writer
- Period: 1981–2011
- Genre: Mystery, fiction, non-fiction

Blaize Clement (August 18, 1932 – July 20, 2011) was an American writer. She is best known for her series of "Dixie Hemingway" mystery novels published by St. Martin's Press, a division of Macmillan. The series has been carried on by her son, John Clement.

== "Dixie Hemingway" novels in order ==
1. Curiosity Killed the Cat Sitter (2005) ISBN 0-312-34056-7
2. Duplicity Dogged the Dachshund (2007) ISBN 0-312-34092-3
3. Even Cat Sitters Get the Blues (2008) ISBN 1-4104-0629-6
4. Cat Sitter on a Hot Tin Roof (2009) ISBN 0-312-36955-7
5. Raining Cat sitters and Dogs (2010) ISBN 0-312-36956-5
6. Cat Sitter Among the Pigeons (2011) ISBN 0-312-64312-8
7. Cat Sitter's Pajamas (2012) ISBN 0-312-64313-6
8. The Cat Sitter's Cradle (2013) (by John Clement) ISBN 978-1250054340
9. The Cat Sitter's Nine Lives (2014) (by John Clement) ISBN 978-1250009333
10. The Cat Sitter's Whiskers (2015) (by John Clement) ISBN 978-1250051165

=== Other publications ===
- Kids Stay Free (Kindle Edition 2011)
- I, Malcolm (Kindle Edition 2011)
- In the Beginning – An Introduction to Hinduism, Buddhism and Taoism (Kindle Edition 2010)
- The Loving Parent – A Guide to Growing Up Before Your Children Do (Impact Publishers 1981) ISBN 0-915166-63-1
