= Billy Bookout =

American football player and coach (1932–2008)

Biographical details
- Born: June 1, 1932; Choice, Texas, U.S.
- Died: October 10, 2008 (aged 76); Bedford, Texas, U.S.

Playing career
- 1951: Oklahoma
- 1953–1954: Austin
- 1955–1956: Green Bay Packers
- Position: Defensive back

Coaching career (HC unless noted)
- 1957: El Paso Austin HS (TX) (JV)
- 1958–1959: Burges HS (TX)
- 1961–1967: Hurst Bell HS (TX) (assistant)
- 1968–1975: Euless Trinity HS (TX)

Head coaching record
- Overall: 39–46–4

Billy Paul Bookout (June 1, 1932 – October 10, 2008) was an American football player and coach. After a stellar high school and college career, Bookout spent two seasons with the Green Bay Packers before starting a coaching career at the high school level.

Despite an outstanding career at Wichita Falls, Bookout did not drew the attention of college scouts. Blessed with uncommon competitiveness and determination, the 5 ft 10 in (1.78 m) 160 pounds (73 kg) Bookout hitchhiked to Norman, Oklahoma, and tried to make the Sooners team as a walk-on. In the first practice, he hit All-American halfback Billy Vessels in the sternum and caused him to fumble. Soon after, he was awarded a scholarship by Sooners coach Bud Wilkinson.

After his sophomore season, Bookout transferred to Austin College, where he received Little All American honors and served as co-captain. Although he went undrafted in the 1955 NFL draft, Bookout made the roster of the Green Bay Packers, beating out former All-Pro cornerback Clarence Self. During the 1955 NFL season, Bookout registered 2 interceptions and 3 caused fumbles. He left the NFL after the 1956 season.

Pursuing a coaching career, Bookout got his first job as junior varsity coach at Austin High School of El Paso, Texas. After the season, he was hired as head coach at newly founded El Paso Burges. At age 25, Bookout was at the time the youngest head coach in the state's highest classification. His lack of experience, however, caused the program to struggle. Bookout had to leave Burges two seasons later, and finally became an assistant coach at Bell HS in the Fort Worth suburb of Hurst. In 1968, he was again hired to initiate a football program at a newly founded high school, at Euless Trinity. Bookout served the school for eight years before retiring as head coach.

== Head coaching record ==
Year	Team	Overall	Conference	Standing	Bowl/playoffs
Burges Mustangs () (1958–1959)
1958	Burges	3–5–1			
1959	Burges	4–5–1			
Burges:		7–10–2			
Euless Trinity Trojans () (1969–1975)
1969	Euless Trinity	5–5			
1970	Euless Trinity	4–6			
1971	Euless Trinity	4–6			
1972	Euless Trinity	4–5–1			
1973	Euless Trinity	7–2–1			
1974	Euless Trinity	5–5			
1975	Euless Trinity	3–7			
Euless Trinity:		32–36–2			
Total:		39–46–4			
