= Wilderville =

Wilderville may refer to:

- Wilderville, Oregon, an unincorporated community in Josephine County, Oregon
- Wilderville, Texas, an unincorporated community in Falls County, Texas
