= Donna–Río Bravo International Bridge =

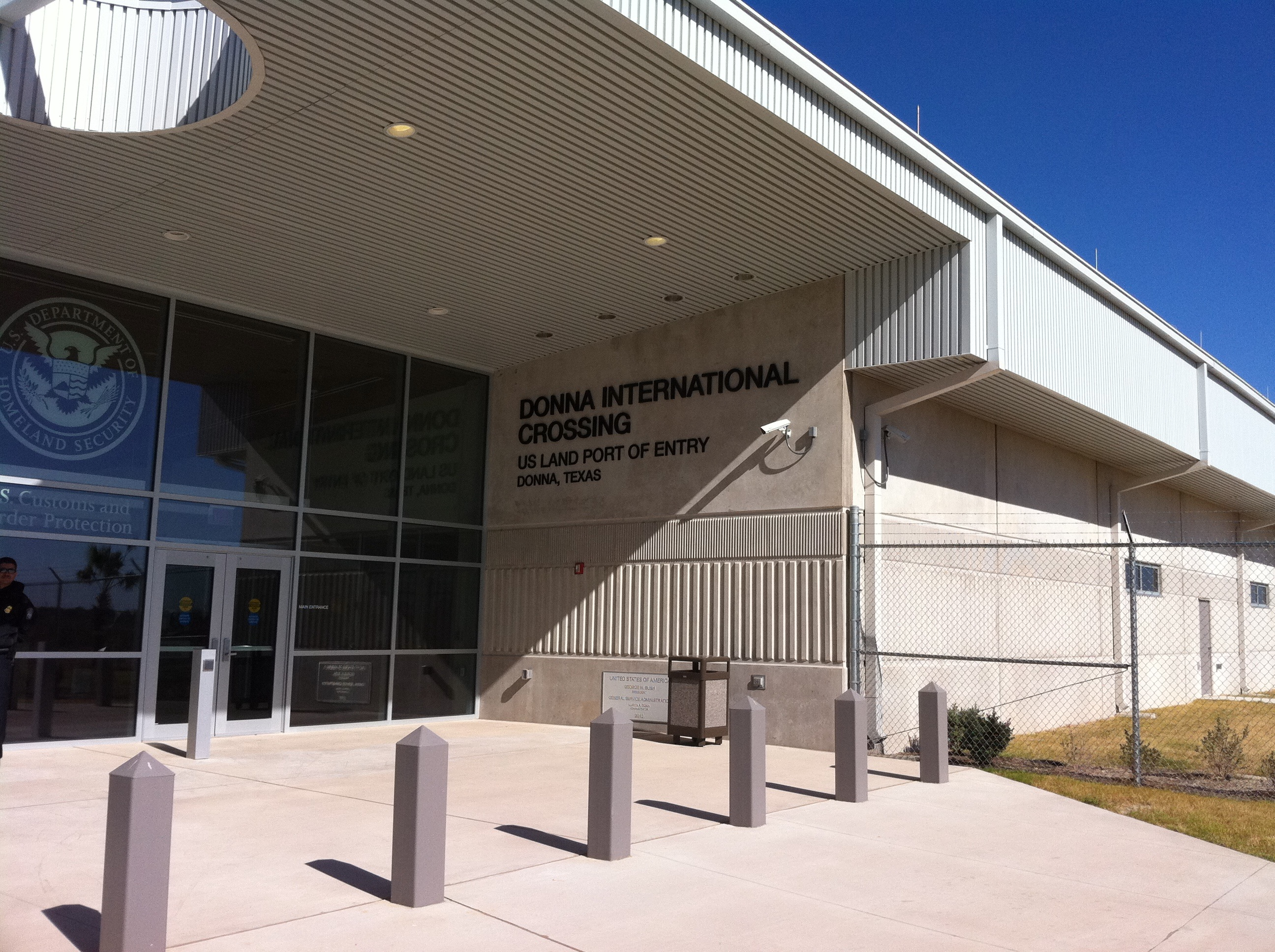
- Donna Texas Border Inspection Station
- Coordinates: 26°04′N 98°05′W
- Carries: Non-commercial vehicles
- Crosses: Rio Grande
- Locale: Donna, Texas–Río Bravo, Tamaulipas
- Other name: Alliance International Bridge
- Website: www.cbp.gov/contact/ports/progresodonna

Characteristics
- Total length: 1,800 feet (550 m)

History
- Opened: December 14, 2010
- Inaugurated: December 15, 2010

Statistics
- Toll: Passenger cars: US$4.00/MX$115.00

Location
- Interactive map of Donna–Río Bravo International Bridge

The Donna–Río Bravo International Bridge, also known as the Alliance International Bridge, is an international bridge that spans the Rio Grande, providing a crossing of the Mexico–United States border between Donna, Texas and Río Bravo, Tamaulipas. The bridge was opened to traffic on December 14, 2010. Only non-commercial vehicles are permitted to use the bridge, but as of 2019 there are plans to open it to commercial traffic. On the U.S. side, the bridge connects with Farm to Market Road 493. On the Mexico side, the bridge's access road provides a connection with Mexican Federal Highway 2D. It is open daily from 6:00 a.m. to 10:00 p.m.

== Base Camp Donna ==
Several hundred United States military troops established Base Camp Donna adjacent to the Port of Entry during Operation Secure Line in fall 2018.

== Detention facility ==
U.S. Customs and Border Protection opened an emergency staging center, officially called the Donna Soft-Sided Processing Facility, at the port of entry in early May 2019. Constructed out of white, temporary tent structures, the camp was initially designed to house 500 migrants, but the capacity doubled by July. There is also the option to increase capacity to 4,000 beds at this site. Detained migrants are held in 125-bed pods, with each bed visible to a central guard tower, but with four-foot-high partitions between them to provide privacy. The structures were built by Deployed Resources LLC under a $36.9 million contract. An additional significant contract has been awarded to Deployed Resources LLC to expand the capacity in 2020/2021. This sole-source contract is currently under investigation to see if the alleged costs are justified.

When the center opened, officials stated that detainees would stay only briefly, less than 72 hours. With the significant increases in illegal border crossings in the Rio Grande Valley in 2021 the wait time has greatly increased, up to several weeks in some cases, while they wait for space to come available in I.C.E. residential centers or H.H.S. facilities.

Emergency processing centers such as the Donna Soft-Sided Processing Facility are quite different to other types of detention facilities in that there is much more freedom of movement during the day and activities are provided during the stay.

Many of the detention standards do not apply to these types of emergency staging facilities and they are mainly required to follow core standards like those set out in the Prison Rape Elimination Act (PREA).

On July 12, the facility was holding some 800 migrants, all of them in officially recognized "family units" or parent-child pairs. The parents and children slept on plastic cots covered with mylar blankets. During a brief encounter with visiting Vice President Mike Pence, overlooked by Border Patrol officials, several children at the camp told him they were being treated well. Pence stated, "We spoke to cheerful children who were watching television, having snacks. They told us that they were being well taken care of.” He later criticized the media for not showing video from the Donna family facility, but only of hundreds of men crowded behind fences at the McAllen Border Patrol station. Reports from migrants who have been held at Donna describe it as having better cleanliness, hygiene, and treatment than other CBP detention centers.

On July 17, 2019, the deployment of 1,000 Texas National Guard troops to the Tornillo and Donna detention facilities was announced.

== See also ==
- List of international bridges in North America
