= Asa, Texas =

Unincorporated community in Texas, US

Asa
- Unincorporated community
- Location in Texas
- Coordinates: 31.4143380°N 97.0541632°W
- Country: United States
- State: Texas
- County: McLennan
- Elevation: 387 ft (118 m)

Asa is an unincorporated community in McLennan County, Texas, United States.

Situated on Farm to Market Road 2643 and 434, it was established as a rest stop on journeys from Waco to Marlin. The community was formerly named Norwood, but was changed to Asa—for Waco businessman and local developer Asa Woodward Warner—after the construction of the Texas and New Orleans Railroad. Economically dependent on cotton production, town declined following the American Civil War. As of 2000, there were 46 residents.
