= Woodward, Texas =

Unincorporated community in Texas, US

Woodward
- Unincorporated community
- Location in Texas
- Coordinates: 28.5335957°N 99.3208692°W
- Country: United States
- State: Texas
- County: La Salle
- Named for: David J. Woodward
- Elevation: 495 ft (151 m)

Population (2000)
  - Total: 10

Woodward is an unincorporated community in La Salle County, Texas, United States.

== History ==
Woodward is situated on Farm to Market Road 469. It was established in 1907 to route the San Antonio, Uvalde and Gulf Railroad. It was named for businessman David J. Woodward. A farming community, it was planned to grow 5,000 acres of farmland and achieve a population of 10,000. A post office operated from 1907 to 1955.

From the 1930s, Woodward declined. The rail depot closed in 1937, and by 2000, the population was 10. Cattle ranching on the surrounding land was established in the 2020s.
