= Willamar, Texas =

- former CDP
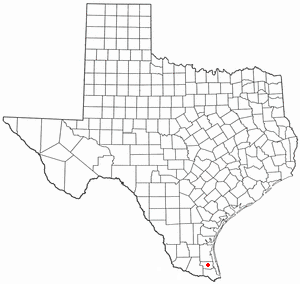
- Location of Willamar, Texas

- Coordinates: 26°25′2″N 97°37′7″W
- Country: United States
- State: Texas
- County: Willacy

Area
  - Total: 2.4 sq mi (6.3 km^{2})
  - Land: 2.4 sq mi (6.3 km^{2})
  - Water: 0 sq mi (0.0 km^{2})
- Elevation: 20 ft (6 m)

Population (2000)
  - Total: 15
  - Density: 6.2/sq mi (2.4/km^{2})
- Time zone: UTC-6 (Central (CST))
  - Summer (DST): UTC-5 (CDT)
- ZIP code: 78580
- Area code: 956
- FIPS code: 48-79288
- GNIS feature ID: 1379276

Willamar is a former census-designated place (CDP) in Willacy County, Texas, United States. It was founded in 1921 and named for its founders, Will Harding and Lamar Gill. The population was 15 at the 2000 census. This CDP was deleted prior to the 2010 census.

== Geography ==
Willamar is located at 26°25′2″N 97°37′7″W (26.417287, -97.618626).

According to the United States Census Bureau, the former CDP had a total area of 2.4 square miles (6.3 km^{2}), all land.

== Demographics ==
As of the census of 2000, there were 15 people, 6 households, and 4 families residing in the CDP. The population density was 6.2 people per square mile (2.4/km^{2}). There were 7 housing units at an average density of 2.9/sq mi (1.1/km^{2}). The racial makeup of the CDP was 33.33% White, 66.67% from other races. Hispanic or Latino of any race were 100.00% of the population.

There were 6 households, out of which 16.7% had children under the age of 18 living with them, 83.3% were married couples living together, and 16.7% were non-families. 16.7% of all households were made up of individuals, and none had someone living alone who was 65 years of age or older. The average household size was 2.50 and the average family size was 2.80.

In the CDP, the population was spread out, with 26.7% under the age of 18, 13.3% from 25 to 44, 46.7% from 45 to 64, and 13.3% who were 65 years of age or older. The median age was 50 years. For every 100 females, there were 114.3 males. For every 100 females age 18 and over, there were 83.3 males.

The median income for a household in the CDP was $21,250, and the median income for a family was $21,250. Males had a median income of $0 versus $0 for females. The per capita income for the CDP was $11,186. None of the population or families were below the poverty line.

== Education ==
Willamar is served by the Lyford Consolidated Independent School District.

In addition, South Texas Independent School District operates magnet schools that serve the community.
