= Wilderville, Texas =

Unincorporated community in Texas, US

Coordinates: 31°06′17″N 96°52′59″W

Wilderville, Texas is an unincorporated community in Falls County, Texas, United States. It is six miles southeast of Rosebud, located on FM 413. In 2000, the population was 45.

== History ==
The area was first settled in the days after the Civil War, in the 1870s by the E. M. Wilder family, the namesake for the community. A post office operated in the town from 1874 to 1906. Three hundred residents lived in the town in the early parts of the 20th century, when Wilderville had two churches, a school, steam gristmills, cotton gins, and a weekly newspaper. However it soon went into decline as the population reached a mere 10 residents by 1930. By 2000, the population had risen to 45 again, but only one store called Wilderville home.
