= Alto Springs, Texas =

Ghost town in Texas, US

- Ghost town
- Location in Texas
- Coordinates: 31.2860113°N 96.6705351°W
- Country: United States
- State: Texas
- County: Falls
- Elevation: 453 ft (138 m)

Alto Springs is a ghost town in Falls County, Texas, United States.

== History ==
Situated on Farm to Market Road 2745, it began as a supply station, in the first half of the 19th century. In 1842, Sam Houston gave the station an address to strengthen the Texas Army. Cynthia Ann Parker reportedly stayed at the station after being found.

A post office operated there from 1846 to 1868. A prospering community at the time, it was considered for becoming county seat of Falls County in 1851, but lost the selection to Marlin, because the then under construction Houston and Texas Central Railway would bypass the settlement.

Through the 20th century, the community declined. Its school was consolidated by the Marlin Independent School District in 1949. The community was abandoned by the 1980s.
