= Williams Creek (Texas) =

Stream in Bandera County, Texas, U.S.

Coordinates: 29°38′36″N 99°16′16″W

Williams Creek is a stream in Bandera County, Texas, in the United States.

Williams Creek was named in the 1850s for a pioneer settler.

== See also ==
- List of rivers of Texas
