= Yarrellton, Texas =

- Unincorporated community
- Location within Texas Location within the United States
- Coordinates: 30°57′3″N 97°4′48″W
- Country: United States
- State: Texas
- County: Milam
- Elevation: 433 ft (132 m)
- Time zone: UTC-6 (Central (CST))
  - Summer (DST): UTC-5 (CDT)
- Area codes: 512 & 737
- GNIS feature ID: 1380809

Yarrellton is an unincorporated community located in Milam County, Texas, United States. According to the Handbook of Texas, the community had a population of 35 in 2000.

== History ==
The first settlers came to Yarrellton from Alabama by wagon train in 1868; among them was American Civil War veteran J.C. Perkins.

== Geography ==
Yarrellton is located on Farm to Market Road 1915, 9 mi (14 km) northwest of Cameron in northwestern Milam County.

== Education ==
The first school in Yarrellton was opened by Joe Eplin in 1876. Classes were held under a brush arbor. Today, the community is served by the Cameron Independent School District.
