= Choice, Texas =

Unincorporated community in Texas, US

Coordinates: 31°41′59″N 94°08′44″W

Choice is an unincorporated community in Shelby County, Texas, United States.

== History ==
A post office called Choice was established in 1904, and remained in operation until 1954. According to tradition, the community's name stems from the literal reading of a postal form's instruction to "pick your choice".
