= Fink, Texas =

Coordinates: 33°48′13″N 96°40′38″W

Fink is a small town in Grayson County, Texas. It is named after Rylan C. Fink.
