= National Register of Historic Places listings in Matagorda County, Texas =

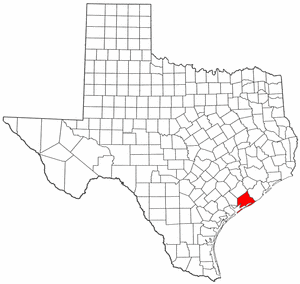
Location of Matagorda County in Texas

This is a list of the National Register of Historic Places listings in Matagorda County, Texas.

This is intended to be a complete list of properties and districts listed on the National Register of Historic Places in Matagorda County, Texas. There are two districts and 13 individual properties listed on the National Register in the county. Nine individually listed properties are designated Recorded Texas Historic Landmarks while one district contains additional Recorded Texas Historic Landmarks.

This National Park Service list is complete through NPS recent listings posted September 4, 2026.

== Current listings ==
The locations of National Register properties and districts may be seen in a mapping service provided.

	Name on the Register	Image	Date listed	Location	City or town	Description
1	Bay City Post Office	Bay City Post Office	May 12, 2009 (#09000307)	2100 Ave. F 28°58′59″N 95°58′12″W	Bay City	
2	Bay City USO Building	Bay City USO Building	June 14, 2006 (#06000512)	2105 Ave. M 28°58′58″N 95°57′41″W	Bay City	Recorded Texas Historic Landmark
3	Blessing Masonic Lodge No. 411	Blessing Masonic Lodge No. 411	February 4, 2011 (#10001222)	619 Ave B, FM 616; 28°52′34″N 96°13′08″W	Blessing	Recorded Texas Historic Landmark
4	Christ Episcopal Church	Christ Episcopal Church	April 10, 2012 (#12000196)	206 Cypress Street; 28°41′33″N 95°58′03″W	Matagorda	Recorded Texas Historic Landmark
5	George Burkhart Culver House		September 10, 2026 (#100013248)	625 Wightman Street; 28°41′39″N 95°58′02″W	Matagorda	
6	Hensley-Gusman House	Hensley-Gusman House	October 4, 2006 (#06000927)	2120 Sixth St. 28°58′56″N 95°57′52″W	Bay City	Recorded Texas Historic Landmark
7	R. J. Hill Building	R. J. Hill Building	October 14, 2009 (#09000840)	401 Commerce St. 28°42′01″N 96°12′54″W	Palacios	Recorded Texas Historic Landmark
8	Judge William Shields Holman House	Judge William Shields Holman House	February 4, 2011 (#10001223)	2504 Avenue K 28°58′43″N 95°57′51″W	Bay City	Recorded Texas Historic Landmark; part of South Side Residential Historic District
9	Hotel Blessing	Hotel Blessing	February 1, 1979 (#79002993)	Ave. B 28°52′17″N 96°13′19″W	Blessing	Recorded Texas Historic Landmark
10	Luther Hotel	Luther Hotel	May 10, 2010 (#10000251)	408 S Bay Blvd. 28°41′58″N 96°12′57″W	Palacios	Recorded Texas Historic Landmark
11	Matagorda Cemetery	Matagorda Cemetery	June 15, 2006 (#06000511)	Jct. of TX 60 at Matagorda Cty Rds 259 and 260; 28°42′10″N 95°57′20″W	Matagorda	
12	Matagorda County Monument	Matagorda County Monument	April 19, 2018 (#100002351)	1700 7th St. 28°58′58″N 95°58′11″W	Bay City	
13	Palacios Colored School		April 29, 2025 (#100011777)	907 8th Street; 28°42′32″N 96°13′14″W	Palacios	
14	Price-Farwell House	Price-Farwell House	October 14, 2009 (#09000841)	308 S. Bay Blvd. 28°41′55″N 96°12′50″W	Palacios	Recorded Texas Historic Landmark
15	South Side Residential Historic District	South Side Residential Historic District	May 30, 2007 (#07000496)	Roughly bounded by Ave. F, 2nd St., Ave. G, Ave. K, 4th St., Ave J, 5th St., 4th St. 28°48′57″N 95°57′59″W	Bay City	Includes Recorded Texas Historic Landmark

== See also ==
- National Register of Historic Places listings in Texas
- Recorded Texas Historic Landmarks in Matagorda County
