= National Register of Historic Places listings in Rusk County, Texas =

Location of Rusk County in Texas

This is a list of the National Register of Historic Places listings in Rusk County, Texas.

This is intended to be a complete list of properties and districts listed on the National Register of Historic Places in Rusk County, Texas. There are one district, six individual properties, and one former property listed on the National Register in the county. Two individually listed properties are Recorded Texas Historic Landmarks with one additional located within the district and another on one of the individual properties.

This National Park Service list is complete through NPS recent listings posted April 25, 2025.

== Current listings ==
The publicly disclosed locations of National Register properties and districts may be seen in a mapping service provided.

	Name on the Register	Image	Date listed	Location	City or town	Description
1	Concord School		September 9, 2024 (#100010801)	19447 FM 95 S 31°56′15″N 94°36′08″W	Mount Enterprise vicinity	
2	Elias and Mattie Crim House	Elias and Mattie Crim House	August 17, 2005 (#05000892)	310 E. Main St. 32°09′10″N 94°47′43″W	Henderson	Recorded Texas Historic Landmark
3	Harmony Hill Site	Harmony Hill Site	May 13, 1976 (#76002062)	Address restricted	Tatum	Smithsonian trinomials 41RK40, 41RK41, 41RK42, 41RK44, 41RK50, 41RK51, 41RK67, 41RK68
4	Henderson Commercial Historic District	Henderson Commercial Historic District	March 10, 1995 (#95000219)	Roughly bounded by Charlevoix, Marshall, Elk and Van Buren Sts. 32°09′10″N 94°47′56″W	Henderson	Includes Recorded Texas Historic Landmark
5	Hudnall-Pirtle Site	Hudnall-Pirtle Site	September 11, 1991 (#91001159)	Address restricted	Easton	Smithsonian trinomial 41RK4
6	Monte Verdi Plantation		March 31, 2014 (#14000104)	11992 Cty. Rd. 4233 W. 31°54′06″N 94°52′15″W	Cushing	Recorded Texas Historic Landmark, includes additional Recorded Texas Historic Landmark
7	Musgano Site	Musgano Site	June 24, 1976 (#76002063)	Address restricted	Tatum	Smithsonian trinomial 41RK19

== Former header ==
	Name on the Register	Image	Date listed	Date removed	Location	City or town	Description
1	Poe-Jones-Richardson House		November 25, 1980 (#80004147)	March 19, 1982	300 Tipps St. 32°09′04″N 94°48′16″W	Henderson	Destroyed by arsonists on May 10, 1981.

== See also ==
- National Register of Historic Places listings in Texas
- Recorded Texas Historic Landmarks in Rusk County
