= Henderson Commercial Historic District (Henderson, Texas) =

Historic district in Texas, United States

- U.S. National Register of Historic Places
- U.S. Historic district
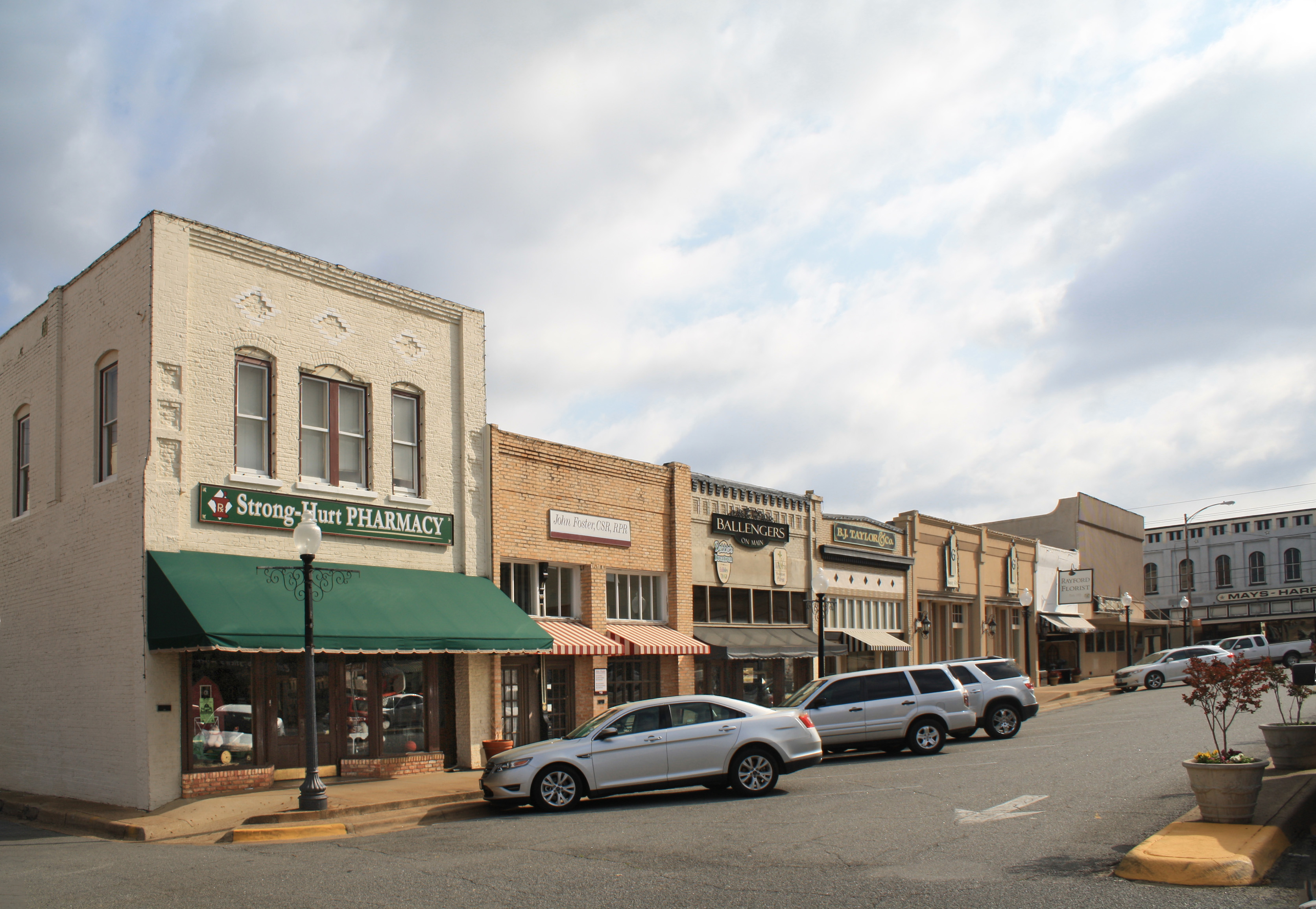
- E. Main St. in Henderson, Texas in 2011

- Location within Texas Location within the United States
- Location: Roughly bounded by Charlevoix, Marshall, Elk and Van Buren Sts., Henderson, Texas
- Coordinates: 32°9′10″N 94°47′56″W
- Area: 25 acres (10 ha)
- Built: 1883
- Architect: Multiple
- Architectural style: Classical Revival, Art Deco, Romanesque
- NRHP reference No.: 95000219
- Added to NRHP: March 10, 1995

The Henderson Commercial Historic District in Henderson, Texas is a 25-acre (10 ha) historic district that was listed on the National Register of Historic Places in 1995. In 1995, it included 39 contributing buildings and two other contributing structures.

Its NRHP nomination states:

Most, but not all, of the buildings postdate the opening of East Texas Oil Field in 1931, which ushered in a brief, yet intense construction boom in the district. These properties convey a strong sense of this era in the district's past and represent a significant part of the area's physical and historical character. This category includes mostly One and Two Part Commercial Block buildings that share many of the same general physical characteristics, such as rectangular building footprints, masonry construction, and 3-bay storefronts, that are associated with their respective broad property type groupings. However, stylistic ornamentation on facades is an effective method of distinguishing buildings in this period of construction from earlier counterparts.

An example of a "One Part Commercial Block building" from the 1920s is the Chamberlain Chevrolet Building at 125 S. Main St.

== See also ==
- National Register of Historic Places listings in Rusk County, Texas
- Recorded Texas Historic Landmarks in Rusk County
