= Hotel Blessing =

- U.S. National Register of Historic Places
- Recorded Texas Historic Landmark
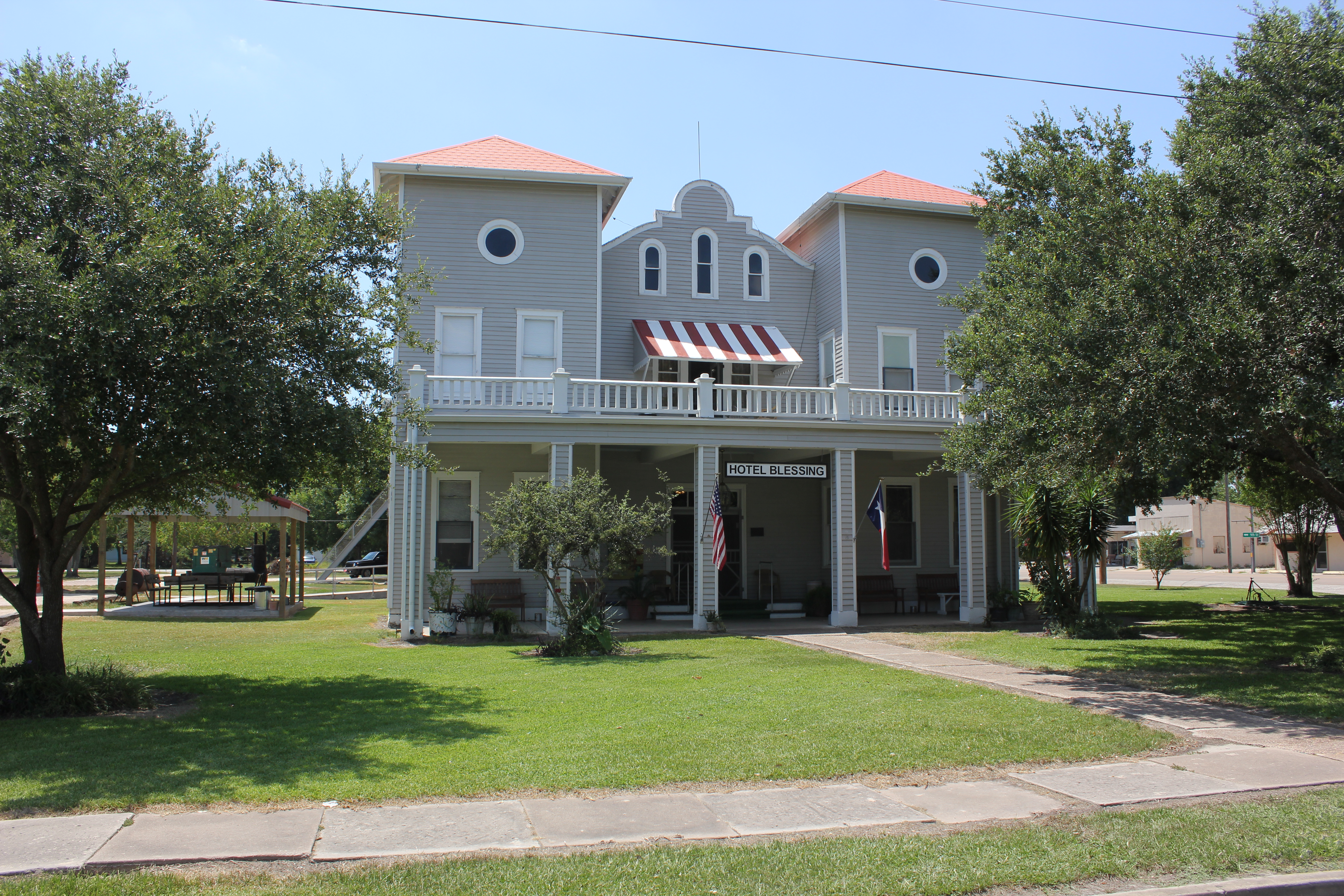
- Hotel Blessing in 2015

- Location within Texas Location within the United States
- Location: Ave. B, Blessing, Texas
- Coordinates: 28°50′38″N 96°13′20″W
- Area: 1.1 acres (0.45 ha)
- Built: 1907
- Built by: Jonathan E. Pierce
- Architect: Jules Leffland
- Architectural style: Mission/Spanish Revival
- NRHP reference No.: 79002993
- RTHL No.: 2570

Significant dates
- Added to NRHP: February 1, 1979
- Designated RTHL: 1965

Hotel Blessing is a historic hotel located in Blessing, Texas, United States. The hotel was designed by Jules Leffland of Victoria. The hotel has been a community gathering place since it opened in 1907 The building was added to the National Register of Historic Places on February 1, 1979.

Hotel Blessing was built by Jonathan Edwards Pierce, Blessing's founder. It was designed in an unusual expression of the Mission Revival style using an entirely wood facade instead of adobe or plaster over brick.

Pierce built the hotel to provide lodging for land seekers settling the region and traveling salesmen. The hotel was refinished and painted in the 1930s. During World War II, wives and girlfriends of soldiers at Camp Hulen in Palacios would frequent the inn. Since World War II, the camp closed and freight train service stopped. The hotel stopped renting rooms in 1972.

In 1977, Able Pierce, Jonathan Pierce's grandson, and his wife Ruth renovated and reopened the hotel. The hotel was deeded to the Blessing Historical Society, which currently operates the hotel. The hotel has 25 rooms, most which have a semiprivate bathroom or share a bathroom in a hall. The hotel also has a popular coffee shop, where locals gather to discuss community events.

== See also ==
- National Register of Historic Places listings in Matagorda County, Texas
- Recorded Texas Historic Landmarks in Matagorda County
