= National Register of Historic Places listings in Milam County, Texas =

Location of Milam County in Texas

This is a list of the National Register of Historic Places listings in Milam County, Texas.

This is intended to be a complete list of properties and districts listed on the National Register of Historic Places in Milam County, Texas. There are one district and four individual properties listed on the National Register in the county. Three individually listed properties are Recorded Texas Historic Landmarks while an additional property is a State Antiquities Landmark that includes two Recorded Texas Historic Landmarks.

This National Park Service list is complete through NPS recent listings posted March 21, 2025.

== Current listings ==
The publicly disclosed locations of National Register properties and districts may be seen in a mapping service provided.

| | Name on the Register | Image | Date listed | Location | City or town | Description |
|---|---|---|---|---|---|---|
| 1 | Dr. Nathan and Lula Cass House | Dr. Nathan and Lula Cass House | February 8, 1991 (#91000037) | 502 N. Travis Ave; 30°51′16″N 96°58′38″W | Cameron | Recorded Texas Historic Landmark |
| 2 | Milam County Courthouse and Jail | Milam County Courthouse and Jail | December 20, 1977 (#77001460) | Public Sq. and S. Fannin and E. 1st St. 30°51′00″N 96°58′34″W | Cameron | State Antiquities Landmark, includes Recorded Texas Historic Landmarks |
| 3 | International & Great Northern Railroad Passenger Depot | International & Great Northern Railroad Passenger Depot | September 13, 2006 (#06000824) | 11 N. Main St. 31°18′25″N 96°53′55″W | Rockdale | Recorded Texas Historic Landmark |
| 4 | R. F. and Minta Pool House | R. F. and Minta Pool House | July 11, 2014 (#14000403) | 901 East 8th Street; 30°51′12″N 96°58′00″W | Cameron | Recorded Texas Historic Landmark |
| 5 | San Xavier Mission Complex Archeological District | San Xavier Mission Complex Archeological District | July 27, 1973 (#73001969) | Address restricted | Rockdale | |

== See also ==
- National Register of Historic Places listings in Texas
- Recorded Texas Historic Landmarks in Milam County
