= Blessing Masonic Lodge No. 411 =

- U.S. National Register of Historic Places
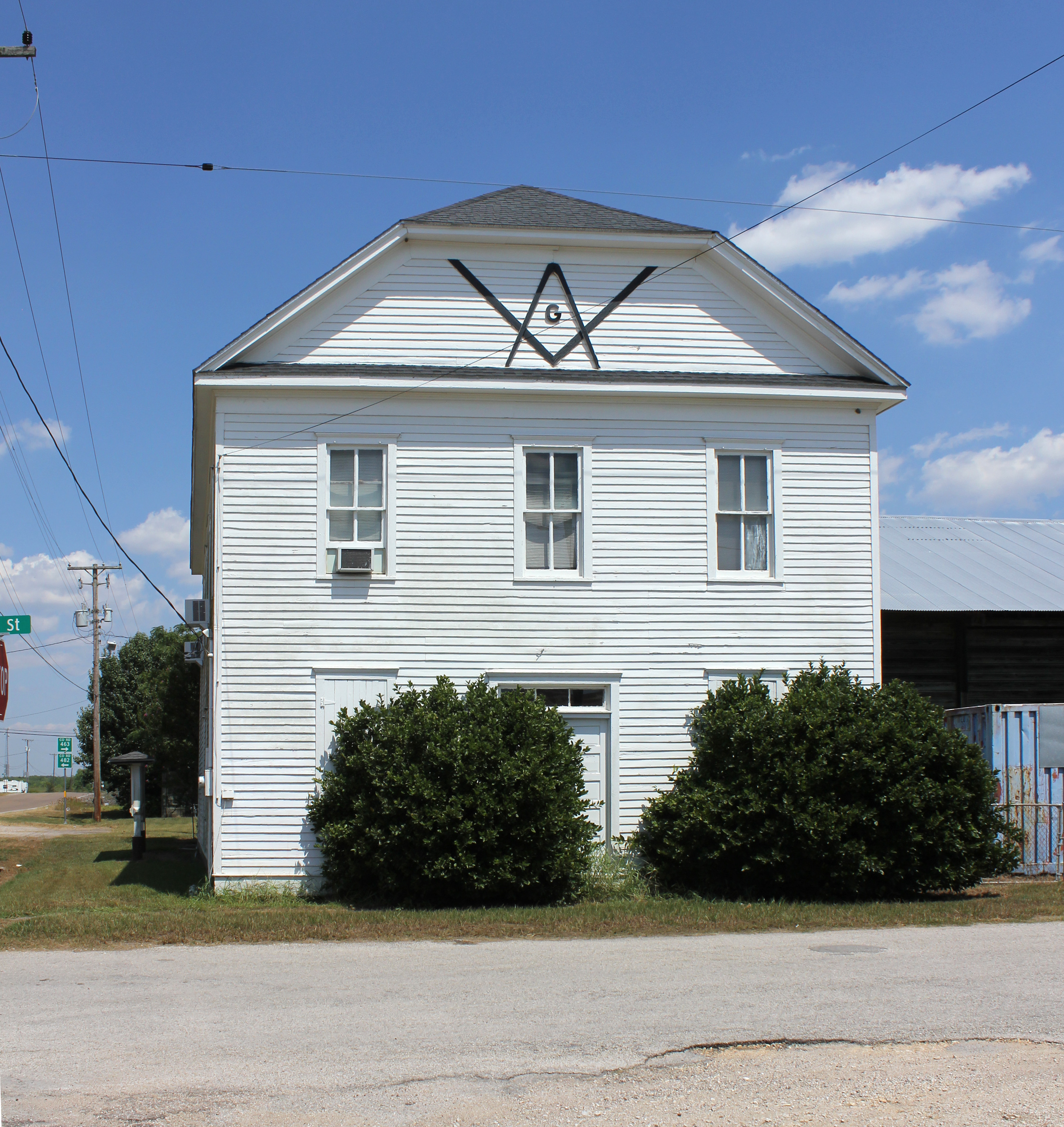

- Location within Texas Location within the United States
- Location: 619 Ave. B/FM 616, Blessing, Texas
- Coordinates: 28°52′34″N 96°13′08″W
- Area: less than one acre
- Built: c.1875
- Architectural style: Texas folk or vernacular
- NRHP reference No.: 10001222
- Added to NRHP: February 4, 2011

The Blessing Masonic Lodge No. 411, also known as Tres Palacios Masonic Lodge, in Blessing, Texas, was built around 1875 and moved to its current location in 1907. It was listed on the National Register of Historic Places in 2011.

It is a two-story 30 by 50 feet (9.1 m × 15.2 m) building which is Texas folk or vernacular in style. It was built near the Tres Palacios River in ca. 1875. It was moved to its current location at 619 Ave. B (FM 616), at 11th Street, in Blessing.
