= Hensley–Gusman House =

Historic house in Texas, United States

- U.S. National Register of Historic Places
- Recorded Texas Historic Landmark
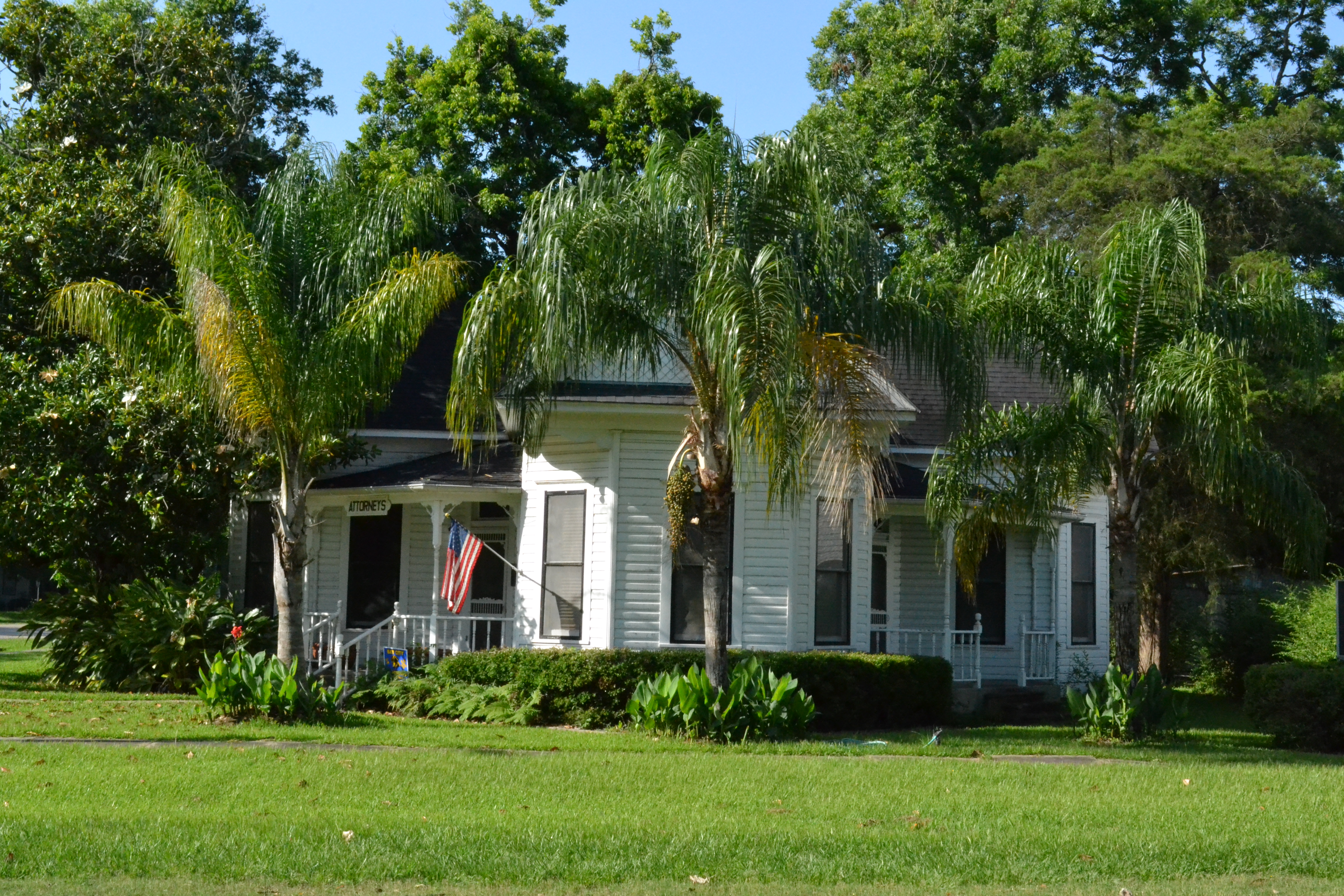
- Hensley–Gusman House in 2016

- Location within Texas Location within the United States
- Location: 2120 Sixth St., Bay City, Texas
- Coordinates: 28°59′0″N 95°57′52″W
- Area: 0.3 acres (0.12 ha)
- Built: 1905
- Built by: Alamo Lumber Co.
- Architect: Henry Hensley
- Architectural style: Queen Anne
- NRHP reference No.: 06000927
- RTHL No.: 2455

Significant dates
- Added to NRHP: October 4, 2006
- Designated RTHL: 1993

Located in Bay City, Matagorda County, Texas, the Hensley–Gusman House was built by Alexander D. Hensley (1859–1947), who purchased land at this site in January 1898. With his wife Maggie (1875–1960), he asked his brother, architect Henry Hensley, to design this house to catch breezes from any direction. It was designated a Recorded Texas Historic Landmark in 1993.

Built in 1905 by the Alamo Lumber Company, the house is a local example of a Victorian-era residence and stylistic influences of the Queen Anne period. It features a distinctive cross-plan layout with octagonal shaped rooms, with porches providing additional spaces to complete the octagon. Because of its unusual floor plan, the house's central living room contains eight doors but no windows; four of the doors open onto the corner porches. Hart pine flooring and wood trim still exists throughout the home along with hart pine doors and transoms. Like many wooden structures in Bay City from the early 20th Century, the structure and exterior of the home is built from cypress lumber.

Prominent features include a cross-gable roof with wood shingled gable ends, and decorative wood brackets at cutaway corners above corner windows. The original wooden porch floors were replaced with concrete in the 1930s, but the decorative wood columns and doors remain. Retail salesman James Robert Gusman (1862–1944), his wife Bettie Amanda Harrington (1864–1948) and their children moved to Bay City from Weimar in 1911. They bought the house from the Hensley's in 1919, and it remained in their family for generations.

In 2003, the Hensley–Gusman House was purchased by Timothy Sloan, a lifelong resident of Bay City and attorney at law, from the Bay City Historical Commission, as the home was left by the Gusman family. After extensive renovations, in August 2007, the Hensley–Gusman House became the new home for the law practice of Timothy Sloan, and son, Matthew Hardy Sloan. In 2016, Matthew Hardy Sloan inherited the home and in 2017 the home became a business office for Edward D. Jones, operated by James Scardami. As of 2019, the home is still owned by Mr. Sloan and maintains its Texas State Historical and National Register of Historical Places listings.

On August 18, 2007, the home was dedicated by the Bay City mayor and local citizens as a National Historic Place. Some modifications have been made in accordance with the National Register of Historic Places in keeping with the historic nature of this property.

All the floors, moldings, doors and windows have been refinished to the original wood finishes. Bedrooms have been furnished into the main lobby, law offices, legal assistant offices, law library and conference room. The kitchen retains its original location, with original cabinetry and updated appliances. The original bathroom has been modified with an addition of a second half-bath to make compliant.

== See also ==
- National Register of Historic Places listings in Matagorda County, Texas
- Recorded Texas Historic Landmarks in Matagorda County
