= Julien Sidney Devereux =

American planter and politician (1805–1856)

- Born: July 23, 1805; Montpelier, Hancock County, Georgia
- Died: May 1, 1856 (aged 50)
- Occupations: Politician, Lawman, Businessman, Civilizer
- Spouses: Adaline Rebecca Bradley; Sarah Ann Landrum
- Children: 4 sons
- Parent: John William Devereux

Julien Sidney Devereux (1805–1856) was an American planter and politician from Texas.

== Early life ==
Julien Sidney Devereux was born on July 23, 1805, in Montpelier, Hancock County, Georgia. His father, John William Devereux, was a farmer.

== Career ==
He served as a Justice of the Peace in Macon County, Alabama, in 1835.

He founded the Terrebonne Plantation in Montgomery County, Texas, along the San Jacinto River in 1841. By 1846, he established the Monte Verdi Plantation in Rusk County, Texas.

He served in the Sixth Texas Legislature from 1855 to 1856.

== Personal life ==
His first marriage, to Adaline Rebecca Bradley, lasted from 1823 to their divorce in 1843. Later that year, he married Sarah Ann Landrum. They had four sons.

== Death ==
He died on May 1, 1856. He was buried in Rusk County, Texas. The Julien Sidney Devereux Family Papers are kept at the Dolph Briscoe Center for American History on the campus of the University of Texas at Austin.
