= Monte Verdi Plantation =

Historic house in Texas, United States

- U.S. National Register of Historic Places
- Recorded Texas Historic Landmark
- Location within Texas Location within the United States
- Location: 11992 CR 4233, Cushing, Texas
- Coordinates: 31°54′6″N 94°52′15″W
- Area: 100.00 acres (40.47 ha)
- Built: 1854
- Architectural style: Greek Revival
- Website: Monte Verdi Plantation
- NRHP reference No.: 14000104
- RTHL No.: 11021 (Plantation); 10960 (Birdwell House)

Significant dates
- Added to NRHP: March 31, 2014
- Designated RTHL: 1964 (Plantation); 1967 (Birdwell House)

The Monte Verdi Plantation is an historic cotton plantation in Rusk County, Texas, worked by enslaved Black people until the June 19, 1865, emancipation of the slaves in the state.

== History ==
Julien Sidney Devereux, a member of the Sixth Texas Legislature, purchased land from 1845 onwards. By 1849, he called it Monte Verdi, which means "green mountain" in Italian. By 1850, 74 enslaved African people worked on the plantation. They produced 120 bales of cotton every year, making it one of the 100 most productive plantations in Texas. At its peak, the plantation covered 10,700 acres.

The plantation house was built from 1856 to 1857. It was designed in the Greek Revival architectural style. It is two story high, with six Doric columns and a balcony on the second floor. Emmett F. Lowry and his wife restored it in the early 1960s.

In 1962, historian Dorman H. Winfrey wrote a history of the plantation entitled Julien Sidney Devereux and His Monte Verdi Plantation, published by the Waco-based Texian Press.

== Historic site ==
The plantation house has been a Recorded Texas Historic Landmark since 1964. Additionally, the National Register of Historic Places has listed the 100-acre core of the plantation since March 31, 2014. The historic core area preserves the history of a large forced-labor cotton farm, active for many years surrounding the Civil War. The Greek Revival plantation house is a good example and retains much of its original materials. The main house, restored in 1960, has an L-shaped plan for the first floor and a rectangular plan for the second, a total of 2,960 square feet. The plantation's main house and a water well are historic structures at the site, including a relocated house and several structures of more recent vintage that are not contributing resources.

The plantation includes the Birdwell House, a Recorded Texas Historic Landmark designated in 1967. The c. 1840 house, initially located in Mount Enterprise, Texas, is a noncontributing building to the plantation as it was moved to the property after the period of historical significance for the plantation's NRHP nomination and was removed from its original context.

== See also ==
- National Register of Historic Places listings in Rusk County, Texas
- Recorded Texas Historic Landmarks in Rusk County
