= Milam County Courthouse and Jail =

- U.S. National Register of Historic Places
- Texas State Antiquities Landmark
- Recorded Texas Historic Landmark
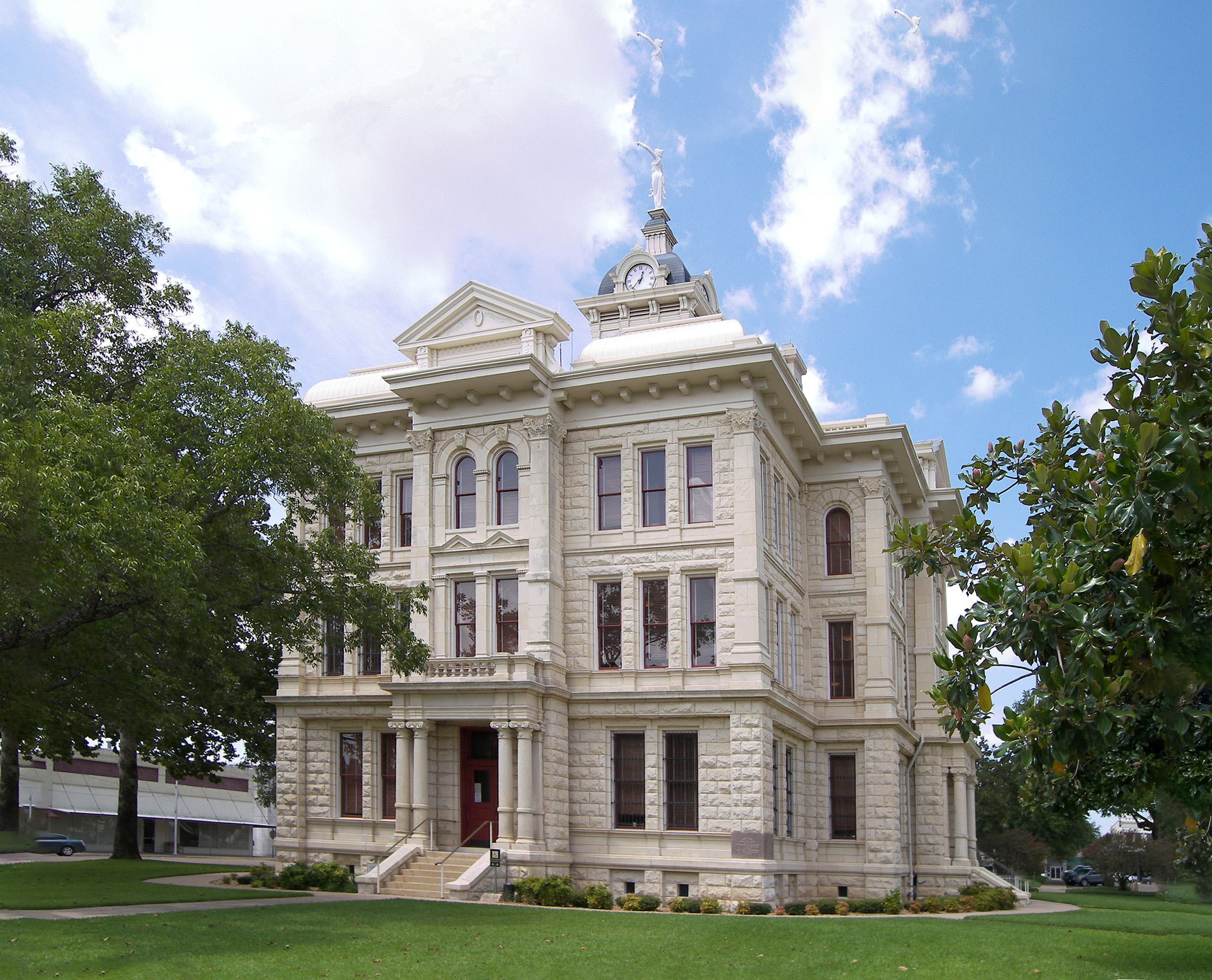
- Milam County Courthouse in 2008

- Location within Texas Location within the United States
- Location: Public Sq. and S. Fannin and E. 1st St., Cameron, Texas
- Coordinates: 30°50′59″N 96°58′33″W
- Area: 3.5 acres (1.4 ha)
- Built: 1890 (courthouse); 1895 (jail)
- Built by: Lee and Plummer (courthouse), Pauly Jail Building and Manufacturing Company (jail)
- Architect: Larmour and Watson (courthouse)
- Architectural style: Renaissance, Romanesque
- NRHP reference No.: 77001460
- TSAL No.: 8200000474
- RTHL No.: 7987 (jail)

Significant dates
- Added to NRHP: December 20, 1977
- Designated TSAL: March 28, 1981
- Designated RTHL: 2008 (jail)

The Milam County Courthouse and Jail are two separate historic county governmental buildings located diagonally opposite each other in Cameron, Milam County, Texas. The Milam County Courthouse, located at 100 South Fannin Avenue, was built in 1890–1892, while the Milam County Jail, now known as the Milam County Museum, was built in 1895. On December 20, 1977, they were added to the National Register of Historic Places as a single entry.

== Milam County Courthouse ==
The Milam County Courthouse, located at 100 South Fannin Avenue, was designed in the Renaissance Revival style of architecture by Austin architect A.O. Watson of the firm of Larmour and Watson. Its east and west facades mirror each other while its north and south facades mirror each other. It was built for $75,000 between 1890 and 1892 by Lee and Plummer, contractors. The cornerstone was dedicated on July 4, 1891, and the building was occupied in April 1892. Built of local stone, it originally consisted of only three stories, but in 1893 it was decided to add a clock tower which was finished in 1895. A statue of Justice was mounted atop the tower. In 1938, however, the clock tower and its statue were removed for safety reasons. In the early 2000s during a restoration of the courthouse, a new clock tower was erected along with a new statue of Justice.

== Milam County Jail ==
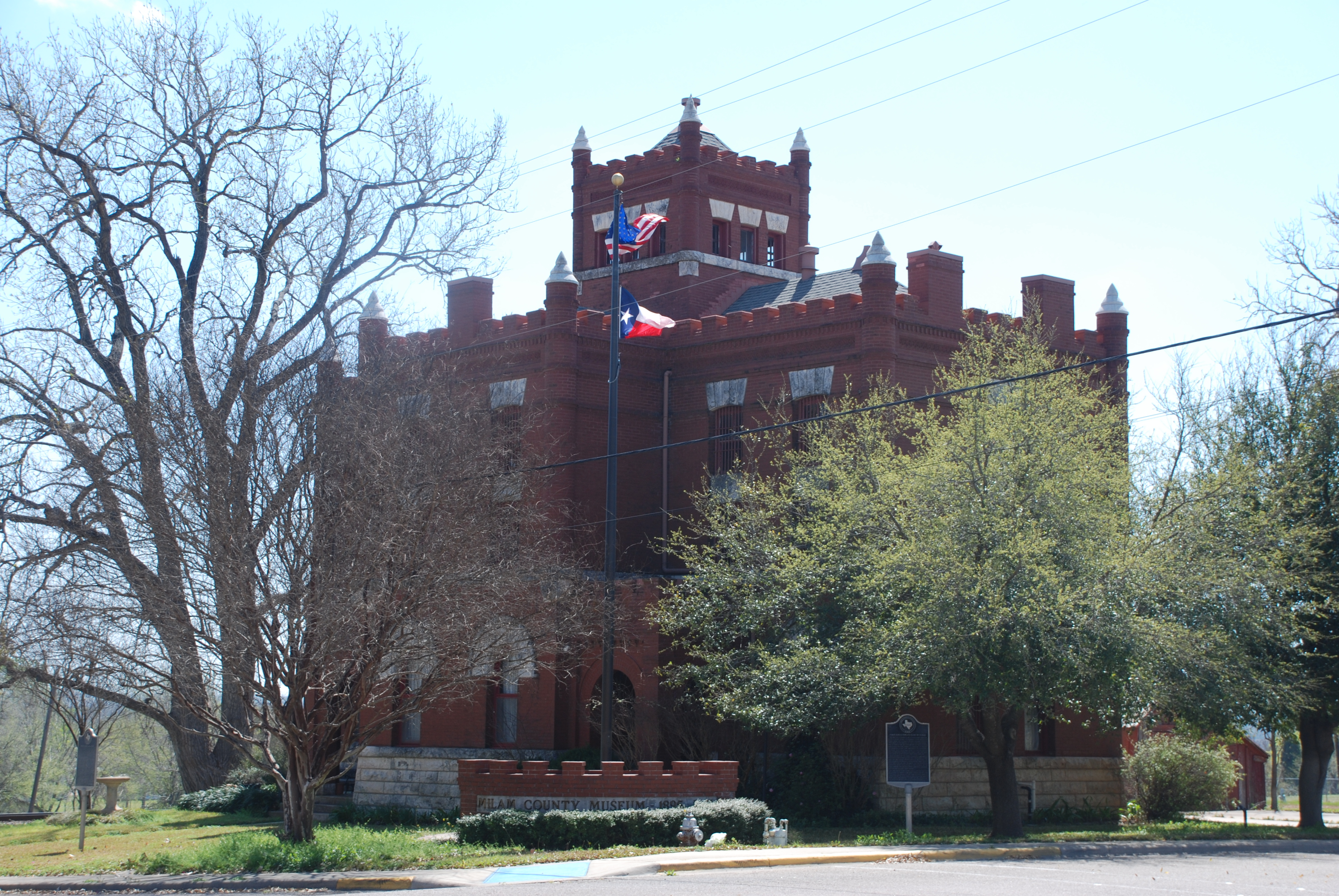
Milam County Jail Museum in 2013

The Milam County Jail, located at East Main Street and South Fannin Avenue and now known as the Milam County Museum, was designed in the Romanesque Revival style of architecture and was built in 1895 by the Pauly Jail Building and Manufacturing Company of St. Louis, Missouri, which brought most building supplies from St. Louis. It is a 3-story building redbrick building with many mini-turrets. It is topped by a hanging tower, which was never used. The first floor was used for storage and a residence for the sheriff and his family, while the second and third floors housed prisoners. It was replaced in 1975 for a more modern jail and then became the local historical museum.

The jail building was designated a Recorded Texas Historic Landmark in 1978. The Jail Museum also houses a 1969 Recorded Texas Historic Landmark plaque for the Green-Batte House which has since burned.

== See also ==
- National Register of Historic Places listings in Milam County, Texas
- Recorded Texas Historic Landmarks in Milam County
