= Scott-Majors House =

- U.S. National Register of Historic Places
- Recorded Texas Historic Landmark
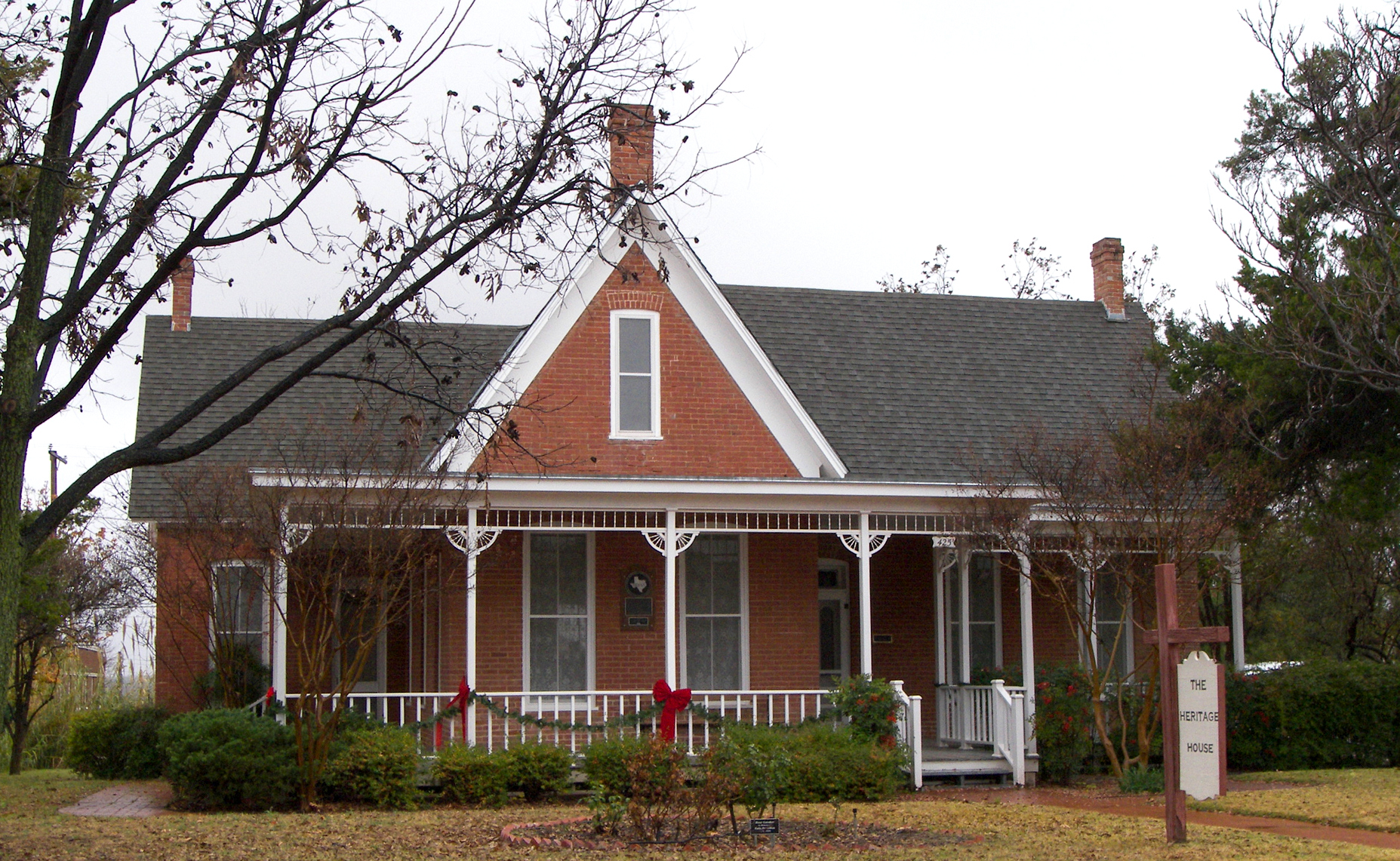
- Scott-Majors House in 2009

- Location within Texas Location within the United States
- Location: 425 Chestnut St., Colorado City, Texas
- Coordinates: 32°23′27″N 100°51′52″W
- Area: less than one acre
- Built: 1883
- Architectural style: Stick/Eastlake
- NRHP reference No.: 79002995
- RTHL No.: 3195

Significant dates
- Added to NRHP: February 5, 1979
- Designated RTHL: 1966

The Scott-Majors House, at 425 Chestnut St. in Colorado City, Texas, was built in 1882 or 1883. It was listed on the National Register of Historic Places in 1979. It has also been known as Heritage House.

It was the first brick house in Colorado City, built by Colonel J.P. Hodgson. It was bought in 1884 by Winfield Scott, president of the First National Bank, who enlarged and redecorated the house, and lived there until 1889. It was later owned by banker and cattleman W.T. Scott (unrelated).

It was later owned by J.P Majors, who opened a jewelry store.

== See also ==
- National Register of Historic Places listings in Mitchell County, Texas
- Recorded Texas Historic Landmarks in Mitchell County
