= Dr. Nathan and Lula Cass House =

Historic house in Texas, United States

- U.S. National Register of Historic Places
- Recorded Texas Historic Landmark
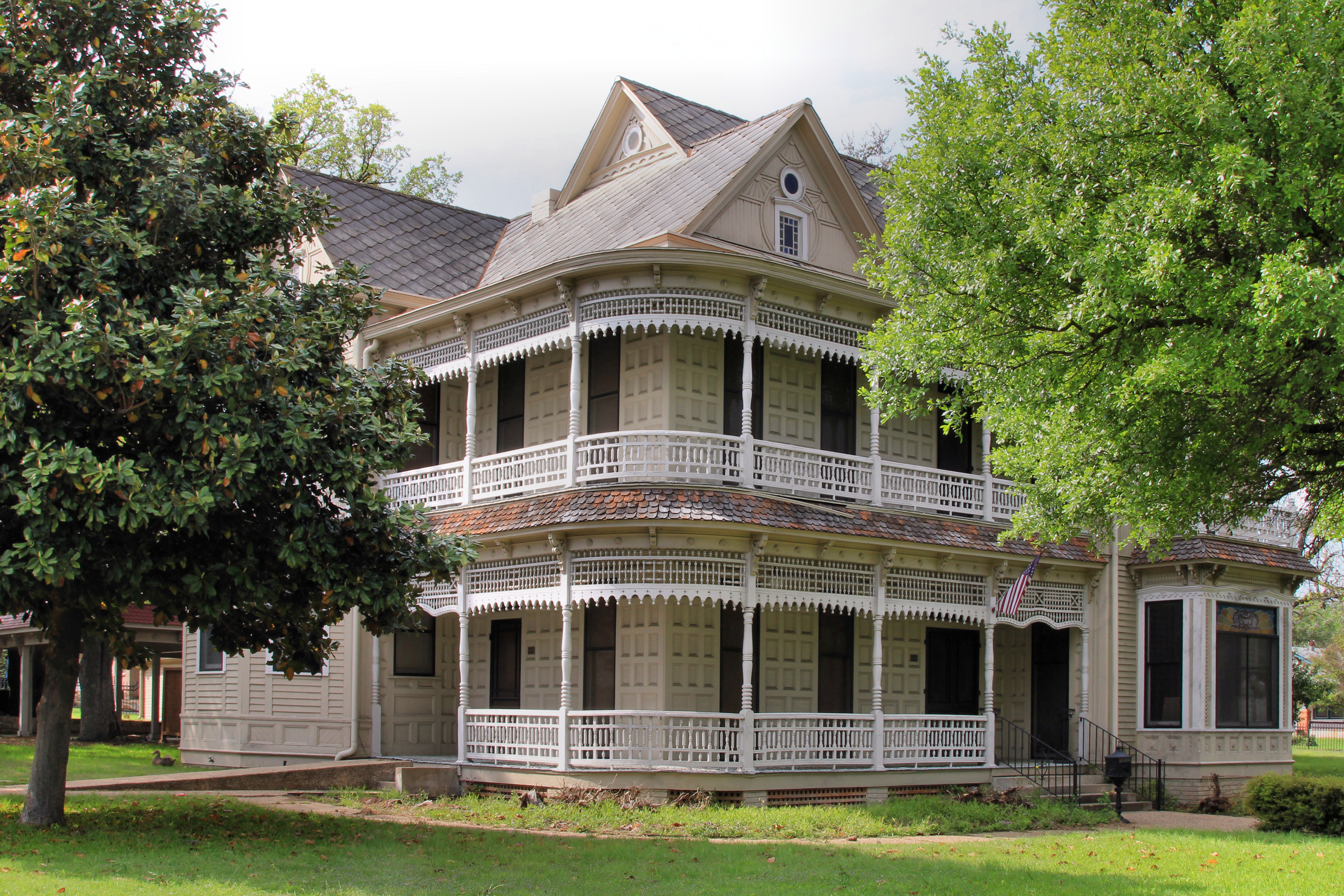
- Cass House in 2018

- Location within Texas Location within the United States
- Location: 502 N. Travis Ave., Cameron, Texas
- Coordinates: 30°50′44″N 96°58′38″W
- Area: less than one acre
- Built: 1885
- Architectural style: Octagon Mode, Queen Anne
- NRHP reference No.: 91000037
- RTHL No.: 7941

Significant dates
- Added to NRHP: February 8, 1991
- Designated RTHL: 1990

The Dr. Nathan and Lula Cass House, also known as the Magnolia House, is a historic octagon house located at 502 N. Travis Avenue in Cameron, Texas, United States. On February 8, 1991, it was added to the National Register of Historic Places. Built in 1885, it was known as the Magnolia Inn until being purchased by a private party in 2018.

== See also ==
- National Register of Historic Places listings in Milam County, Texas
- Recorded Texas Historic Landmarks in Milam County
