= Blessing, Texas =

- CDP
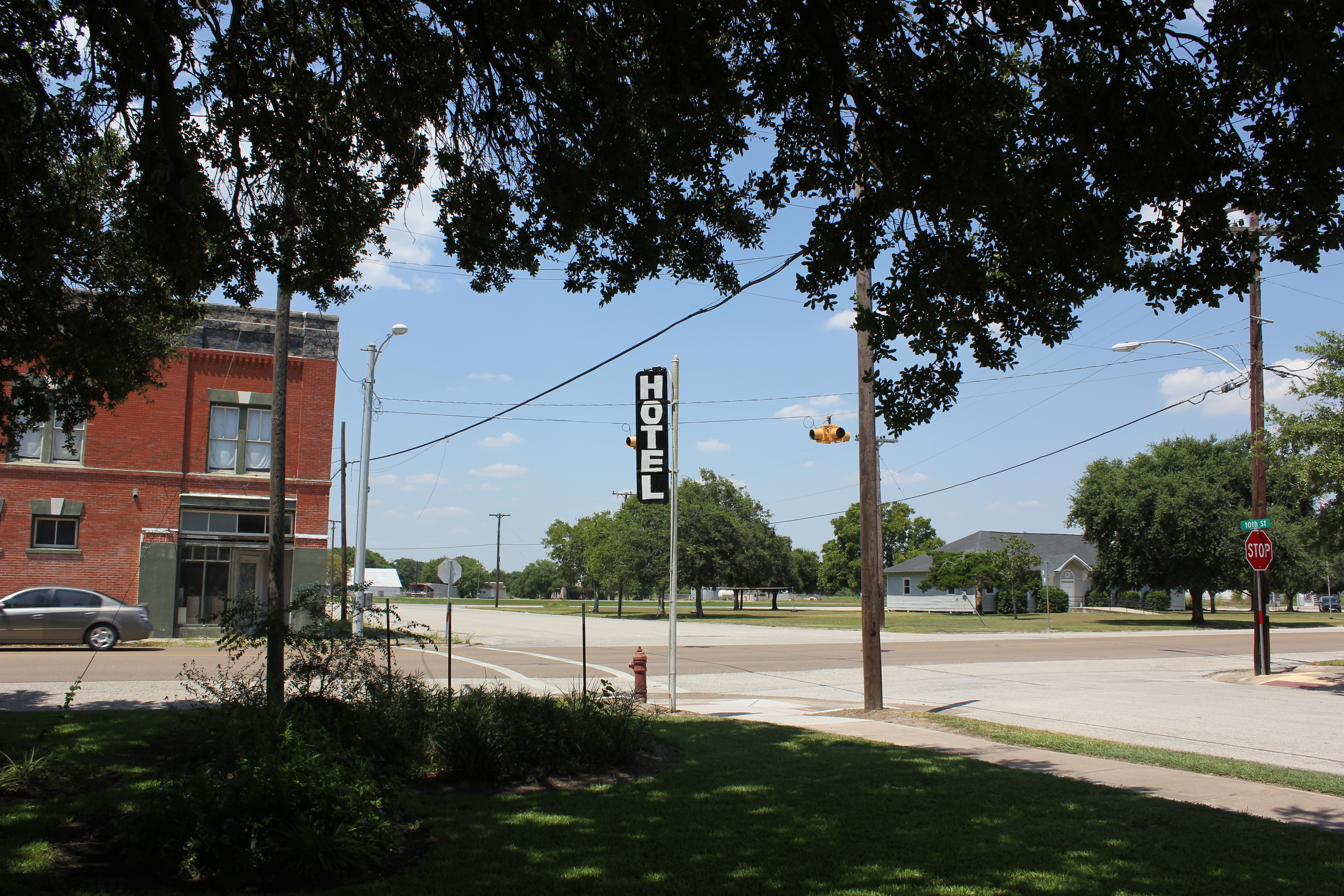
- Downtown Blessing

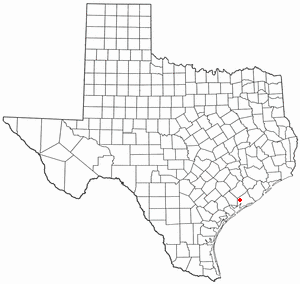
- Location of Blessing, Texas

- Coordinates: 28°52′27″N 96°12′55″W
- Country: United States
- State: Texas
- County: Matagorda

Area
  - Total: 2.0 sq mi (5.3 km^{2})
  - Land: 2.0 sq mi (5.3 km^{2})
  - Water: 0 sq mi (0.0 km^{2})
- Elevation: 36 ft (11 m)

Population (2020)
  - Total: 856
  - Density: 420/sq mi (160/km^{2})
- Time zone: UTC-6 (Central (CST))
  - Summer (DST): UTC-5 (CDT)
- ZIP code: 77419
- Area code: 361
- FIPS code: 48-08668
- GNIS feature ID: 2407862

Blessing is a census-designated place (CDP) in Matagorda County, Texas, United States. The population was 856 at the 2020 census.

Blessing got its start when the railroad finally was extended to that point, and first settlers accepted the name "Blessing" after their first choice of "Thank God" was deemed unsuitable by postal officials. A post office called Blessing has been in operation since 1903.

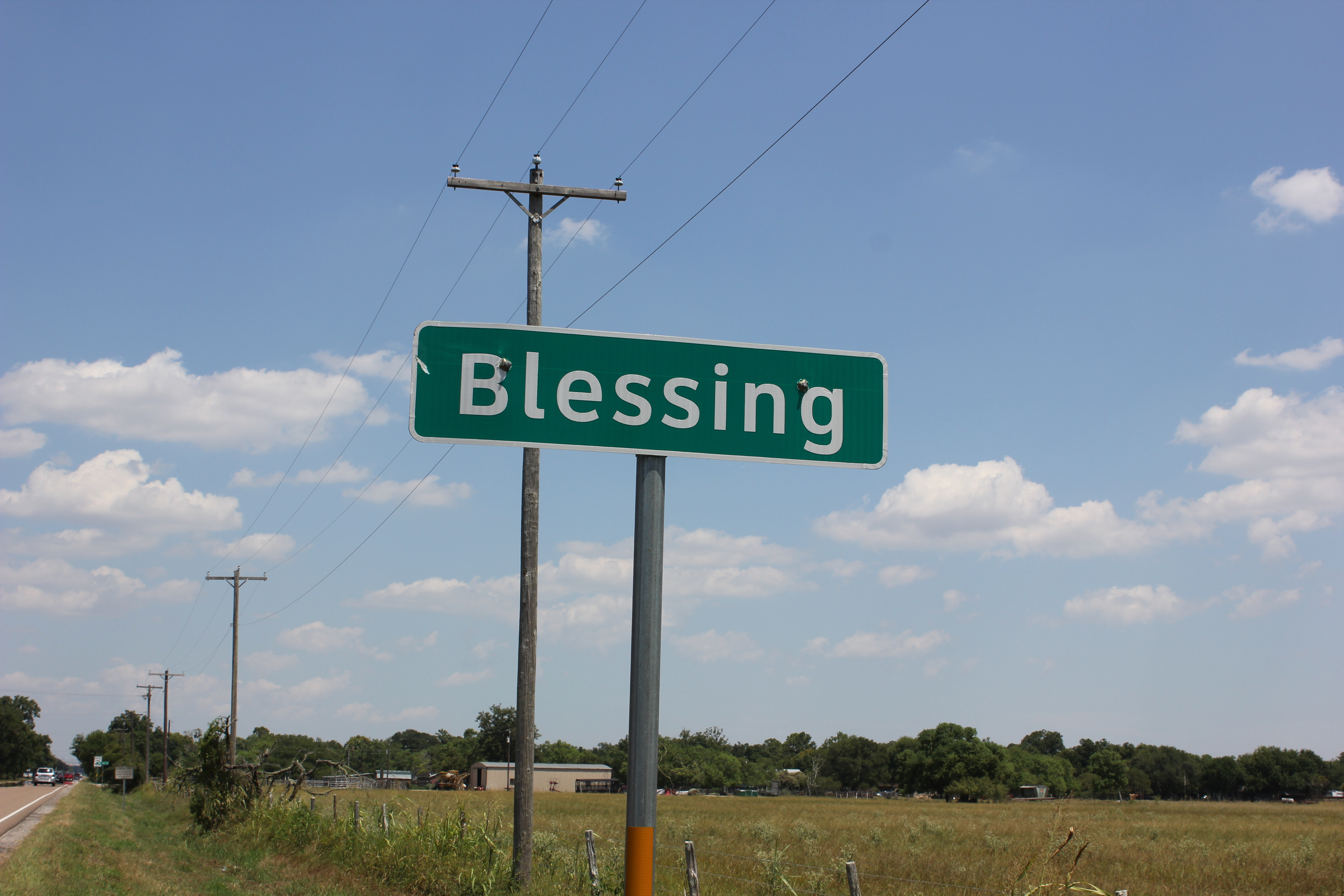
City limit of Blessing, Texas

== Geography ==
According to the United States Census Bureau, the CDP has a total area of 2.0 square miles (5.2 km^{2}), all land.

== Demographics ==
Historical population
Census	Pop.	Note	%±
2000	861		—
2010	927		7.7%
2020	856		−7.7%
U.S. Decennial Census; 1850–1900 1910; 1920 1930 1940; 1950 1960 1970; 1980 1990 2000; 2010

Blessing first appeared as a census designated place in the 2000 U.S. census.

=== 2020 census ===
Blessing CDP, Texas – Racial and ethnic composition Note: the US Census treats Hispanic/Latino as an ethnic category. This table excludes Latinos from the racial categories and assigns them to a separate category. Hispanics/Latinos may be of any race.
Race / Ethnicity (NH = Non-Hispanic)	Pop 2000	Pop 2010	Pop 2020	% 2000	% 2010	% 2020
White alone (NH)	405	375	288	47.04%	40.45%	33.64%
Black or African American alone (NH)	51	25	11	5.92%	2.70%	1.29%
Native American or Alaska Native alone (NH)	0	3	1	0.00%	0.32%	0.12%
Asian alone (NH)	0	0	1	0.00%	0.00%	0.12%
Native Hawaiian or Pacific Islander alone (NH)	0	0	0	0.00%	0.00%	0.00%
Other race alone (NH)	0	0	5	0.00%	0.00%	0.58%
Mixed race or Multiracial (NH)	8	4	11	0.93%	0.43%	1.29%
Hispanic or Latino (any race)	397	520	539	46.11%	56.09%	62.97%
Total	861	927	856	100.00%	100.00%	100.00%

=== 2000 census ===
As of the census of 2000, there were 861 people, 300 households, and 230 families residing in the CDP. The population density was 423.8 inhabitants per square mile (163.6/km^{2}). There were 334 housing units at an average density of 164.4 per square mile (63.5/km^{2}). The racial makeup of the CDP was 72.01% White, 5.92% Black, 19.98% from other races, and 2.09% from two or more races. Hispanic or Latino of any race were 46.11% of the population.

There were 300 households, out of which 39.7% had children under the age of 18 living with them, 64.3% were married couples living together, 8.7% had a female householder with no husband present, and 23.3% were non-families. 20.7% of all households were made up of individuals, and 10.7% had someone living alone who was 65 years of age or older. The average household size was 2.87 and the average family size was 3.36.

In the CDP, the population was spread out, with 32.2% under the age of 18, 9.2% from 18 to 24, 26.5% from 25 to 44, 18.7% from 45 to 64, and 13.5% who were 65 years of age or older. The median age was 32 years. For every 100 females, there were 111.0 males. For every 100 females age 18 and over, there were 102.8 males.

The median income for a household in the CDP was $22,989, and the median income for a family was $27,431. Males had a median income of $25,833 versus $30,288 for females. The per capita income for the CDP was $10,980. About 26.0% of families and 24.2% of the population were below the poverty line, including 23.4% of those under age 18 and 32.0% of those age 65 or over.

== Education ==
Blessing is served by the Tidehaven Independent School District.

The designated community college for Tidehaven ISD is Wharton County Junior College.

== Notable people ==
- Pudge Heffelfinger-first professional footballer died here in 1954
- Kelly Siegler, a former Harris County, Texas prosecutor, was raised in Blessing. Since 2013, she has starred in the true crime series Cold Justice, collaborating with law enforcement to solve unsolved homicide cases.
