= List of Recorded Texas Historic Landmarks (Mason-Rusk) =

The following is a partial list of Recorded Texas Historic Landmarks (RTHLs) arranged by county as designated by the Texas Historical Commission and local county historical commissions in Texas. This page includes RTHLs in the following counties: Mason, Matagorda, Maverick, McCulloch, McLennan, McMullen, Medina, Menard, Midland, Milam, Mills, Mitchell, Montague, Montgomery, Moore, Morris, Motley, Nacogdoches, Navarro, Newton, Nolan, Nueces, Ochiltree, Oldham, Orange, Palo Pinto, Panola, Parker, Parmer, Pecos, Polk, Potter, Presidio, Rains, Randall, Reagan, Real, Red River, Reeves, Refugio, Roberts, Robertson, Rockwall, Runnels, and Rusk.

Recorded Texas Historic Landmarks listed by county
Anderson-Callahan • Cameron-Duval • Eastland-Gray • Grayson-Hudspeth • Hunt-Martin • Mason-Rusk • Sabine-Travis • Trinity-Zavala

KEY

Landmarks with multiple historic designations are colored according to their highest designation within the following hierarchy.

⁕ Listed individually on the National Register of Historic Places (NRHP) as a National Historic Landmark
⁂ Listed on the NRHP as a contributing property of a National Historic Landmark District
† Listed individually on the NRHP
‡ Listed as a contributing property of an NRHP Historic District
§ Listed individually as or as part of a State Historic Site
# Listed individually as or as part of a State Antiquities Landmark

== Mason County ==
Registered Texas Historic Landmark	Image	Marker number	Physical address	Nearest city	Year designated	Description
Art Methodist Church		11266	Art-Hedwigs Hill Rd. S of SH 29 30°44′15″N 99°7′12″W	Art	1968	Off Art-Hedwig Rd
Art Schoolhouse		11267	Lower Willow Creek Rd. S of SH 29 30°44′3″N 99°6′43″W	Art	1968	From Art take Lower Willowcreek Rd. south approx. 400 yds.
Bethel M. E. Church		11269	5840 Loeffler Ln. 30°35′14″N 99°6′41″W	Mason vicinity	1965	take US 87 approx. 10 miles south to RR 783; then approx. 4.2 miles south on RR 783 to Loeffler Lane; then 0.2 mile east
Broad Street Bridge‡	More images	12047	Broad St. over Comanche Creek 30°45′9″N 99°13′53″W	Mason	1998	Broad Street at Comanche Creek
First Christian Church‡		11272	100 Willow St. 30°44′52″N 99°13′29″W	Mason	1973	Corner of Austin St. and Willow St.
Holmes & Bierschwale Law and Land Office‡		12510	421 McKavett St. 30°44′59″N 99°14′5″W	Mason	2000	(McKavett St. is also US 87 N)
Mason County Courthouse‡#	More images	11286	Courthouse Square S of W. Austin St. 30°44′56″N 99°13′27″W	Mason	1988	Courthouse Square
Mason County Jail‡		11287	S of Westmoreland St. between Moody St. and Post Hill St. 30°44′51″N 99°13′55″W	Mason	1983	Corner of Westmoreland and Post Hill St.
Mason House Hotel & Stage Station‡		12048	NE corner Austin St. at N. Live Oak St. 30°44′57″N 99°13′51″W	Mason	1999	Live Oak and SH 29, Mason
Old Mason Grammar School‡		11289	SE corner Schmidt St. at Post Hill St. 30°44′42″N 99°13′54″W	Mason	1965	Corner of Post Hill and Schmidt St.
Rudolph and Therese Runge House		13029	916 San Antonio St. 30°44′28″N 99°13′22″W	Mason	2003	916 San Antonio
Seaquist Home†‡		11293	400 Broad St. 30°45′5″N 99°13′54″W	Mason	1974	Corner of Broad and Lotus streets
Spring Street Church‡		11295	403 Spring St. 30°45′7″N 99°14′0″W	Mason	1989	Spring St. at Bluebird
St. Paul Lutheran Church‡		11292	102 Magnolia St. 30°44′53″N 99°13′42″W	Mason	1972	
Taylor-Carter House		12049	610 N. Robin Ave. 30°45′17″N 99°14′17″W	Mason	1999	
The Lindsay House‡		11284	516 Spring St. 30°45′11″N 99°14′0″W	Mason	1984	

== Matagorda County ==
Registered Texas Historic Landmark	Image	Marker number	Physical address	Nearest city	Year designated	Description
Bandstand		295	2000 Sixth St. 28°58′54″N 95°57′57″W	Bay City	1967	2000 Sixth Street, Bay City
Bay City U.S.O. Building†		12050	2105 Ave. M 28°59′4″N 95°57′44″W	Bay City	1999	
Blessing State Bank	More images	12054	SE corner Ave. B at N. Tenth St. 28°52′18″N 96°13′17″W	Blessing	1997	corner of Avenue B and 10th Street, Blessing
Cates-Price House		12061	506 S. Bay Blvd. 28°41′58″N 96°13′3″W	Palacios	1998	
Christ Episcopal Church†		840	206 Cypress St. 28°41′33″N 95°58′3″W	Matagorda	1962	southeast corner of Cypress and Lewis; Matagorda
D. P. and Louise Moore House		1145	2404 Ave. E 28°58′46″N 95°58′18″W	Bay City	1994	2404 Avenue E, Bay City
Dale-Rugeley-Sisk Home ca. 1830		1157	751 Catalpa St. 28°41′33″N 95°57′52″W	Matagorda	1964	southeast corner of Fisher and Catalpa; Matagorda
Fisher-Sargent-Gottschalk House		1901	107 St. Mary St. 28°41′16″N 95°58′22″W	Matagorda	1991	107 St. Mary, Matagorda
Hawkins Lake Home		2410	S of FM 521 near Lake Austin 28°49′40″N 95°47′35″W	Wadsworth	1962	SH 60 18 southeast from Bay City to FM 521; then 3 1/2 miles south to Lake Austin (Private Property) - Not Surveyed
Hensley - Gusman House†		2455	2120 Sixth St. 28°58′56″N 95°57′52″W	Bay City	1994	2120 6th Street, Bay City
Holman House†‡		2511	2504 Ave. K 28°58′43″N 95°57′51″W	Bay City	1994	2504 Avenue K, Bay City
Home of Horace Yeamans		2538	S of FM 521 W of Cashs Creek 28°47′18″N 96°11′41″W	Palacios	1965	from missing go east on SH 35 approximately 6 miles; then north on FM 521 approximately 1 mile
Hotel Blessing†	More images	2570	128 N. Tenth St. 28°52′17″N 96°13′19″W	Blessing	1965	corner 10th and FM 616; Blessing
Kilbridge - Barkley House‡		2938	1704 Third St. 28°58′42″N 95°58′10″W	Bay City	1994	1704 3rd Street, Bay City
Luther Hotel†		3149	408 S. Bay Blvd. 28°41′58″N 96°12′57″W	Palacios	1965	408 South Bay, Palacios (between 4th and 6th Streets)
M. S. and Cora Alice Perry House‡		12067	2504 Ave. I 28°58′43″N 95°58′0″W	Bay City	1997	
Masonic Lodge #411†	More images	3243	619 Ave. B 28°52′34″N 96°13′8″W	Blessing	1965	southeast corner of 11th and FM 616; Blessing
Old Bay City Bank		3689	2044 Ave. F 28°58′59″N 95°58′13″W	Bay City	1965	corner (northwest) of FM 60 and SH 35, Bay City or 2044 Avenue F, Bay City
Old Matagorda Post Office		3763	SW corner Laurel St. at Fisher St. 28°41′20″N 95°58′18″W	Matagorda	1965	northeast corner of Fisher and Laurel; Matagorda
Price-Farwell House†		13282	300 S. Bay Blvd. 28°41′55″N 96°12′50″W	Palacios	2004	300 S Bay
Pybus-Koerber House		13244	208 Main St. 28°42′6″N 96°12′46″W	Palacios	2004	208 Main St
R. J. Hill Building†		12436	401 Commerce St. 28°42′1″N 96°12′54″W	Palacios	2000	
Rugeley Building (Old City Bank)		15246	2044 Ave. F 28°58′59″N 95°58′13″W	Bay City	1965	
Sargent-Rugeley-Herreth House		18099	3224 Ave. K 28°58′14″N 95°57′50″W	Bay City	2015	
St. Francis Catholic		5031	105 mi. W on FM 521 28°48′26″N 95°57′13″W	Wadsworth	1965	from Wadsworth go west on SH 521 approximately 1.5 miles
The A. B. Pierce Home		5283	366 Ave. C 28°52′9″N 96°13′27″W	Blessing	1968	corner of 8th and Avenue C; Blessing
The Culver Home		5317	1001 Wightman St. 28°41′40″N 95°58′2″W	Matagorda	1967	northeast corner of Wightman and Caney Street, Matagorda
The F. Cornelius House		5330	E end of CR 450 at Juanita Creek 28°57′19″N 96°11′12″W	Midfield	1971	from Midfield go north on SH 71 approximately 2 miles; 120 east on one lane paved road approximately 2 miles (turns to dirt road approximately .5 miles from house)
W.C. Williams Building		18282	456 Commerce St. 28°42′2″N 96°13′0″W	Palacios	2015	
Yeamans-Stallard House		14498	S of FM 521 W of Cashs Creek 28°47′18″N 96°11′41″W	Palacios	1965	

== Maverick County ==
Registered Texas Historic Landmark	Image	Marker number	Physical address	Nearest city	Year designated	Description
Church of the Redeemer		862	648 Madison St. 28°42′48″N 100°30′11″W	Eagle Pass	1978	648 Madison Street, Eagle Pass
Dos Chimeneas Ranch House		18547	17703-18509 US 277	Eagle Pass	2016	
Eagle Pass Post Office		1328	589 E. Main St. 28°42′31″N 100°30′3″W	Eagle Pass	1996	589 Main Street, Eagle Pass
Maverick County Courthouse†#	More images	3261	501 E. Main St. 28°42′32″N 100°30′5″W	Eagle Pass	1971	Courthouse lawn
S. P. Simpson Jr. House		4402	597 N. Ceylon St. 28°42′46″N 100°30′3″W	Eagle Pass	1972	597 Ceylon Street (door reads 597 at bottom, but 419 at top)
The Lee Building‡		5370	400 Bliss St. 28°42′9″N 100°30′10″W	Eagle Pass	1968	Adams Street on right 1 block past hospital

== McCulloch County ==
Registered Texas Historic Landmark	Image	Marker number	Physical address	Nearest city	Year designated	Description
Camp San Saba Masonic Lodge		678	10 mi. S of Brady near FM 1955	Brady vicinity	1962	FM 1955, in Camp San Saba community; about 10 miles south of Brady via US 87
East Sweden Presbyterian Church		1367	CR 414 at CR 412 31°9′59″N 99°15′25″W	Brady vicinity	1989	From Brady take US 190 5.5 miles northeast, then turn east on CR 412. Church is at junction with CR 414. Destroyed by fire March 20, 2022.
McCulloch County Courthouse†#	More images	3286	199 Courthouse Sq. 31°8′6″N 99°20′5″W	Brady	1967	Courthouse square, US 87/377 at US 190
McCulloch County Jail†		3287	117 N. High St. 31°8′7″N 99°20′12″W	Brady	1976	
Ogden Home		3679	10 mi. S of Brady near FM 1955	Brady vicinity	1962	10 miles south of Brady on US 377/87 in the Camp San Saba community
Union Passenger Depot	More images	5597	505 N. Bridge St. 31°8′21″N 99°20′9″W	Brady	1984	North Bridge Street

== McLennan County ==
Registered Texas Historic Landmark	Image	Marker number	Physical address	Nearest city	Year designated	Description
Albert Turner Clifton House		103	2600 Austin Ave. 31°32′22″N 97°9′4″W	Waco	1991	2600 Austin (26th Austin)
Alico Building‡	More images	118	425 Austin Ave. 31°33′25″N 97°7′55″W	Waco	1982	425 Austin Ave. (4th Austin), Waco
Austin Avenue Methodist Church‡	More images	241	1300 Austin Ave. 31°33′0″N 97°8′20″W	Waco	1990	1300 Austin Ave. (13th Austin), Waco
Bagby House		274	1825 S. Eighth St. 31°32′27″N 97°7′7″W	Waco	1983	1825 S. 8th (corner of S. 8th St. and Wood Ave) - razed in 2014
Best Theatre Building	More images	386	218 N. Main St. 31°48′11″N 97°5′30″W	West	1994	218 N Main
Bull Hide Creek Iron Bridge		14774	W of I-35 over Bull Hide Creek between Lorena and Hewitt 31°25′2″N 97°11′59″W	Waco	1994	
Deyerle-Fall House		12118	917 Old Oglesby Rd. 31°26′8″N 97°26′19″W	McGregor	1998	
Earle-Harrison House		1334	1901 N. Fifth St. 31°34′9″N 97°8′53″W	Waco	1970	1901 N. 5th St., Waco
Earle-Napier-Kinnard House†		1335	814 S. Fourth St. 31°34′43″N 97°7′21″W	Waco	1969	814 S. 4th (at corner of 4th & I-35), Waco
East Terrace†		1368	100 Mill St. 31°34′2″N 97°8′1″W	Waco	1962	100 Mill Ave. (corner of Mill and Lake Brazos Dr; House faces Lake Brazos Dr.), Waco
Eddy Methodist Church		1386	404 W. Third St. 31°17′49″N 97°15′22″W	Eddy	1993	Corner of SH 107 and Ausborn St., Eddy
Elite Cafe		1454	2132 S. Valley Mills Dr. 31°31′29″N 97°7′58″W	Waco	1994	2132 S. Valley Mills Dr. (on the Circle Off I-35), Waco
First Lutheran Church		1736	1008 Jefferson Ave. 31°33′19″N 97°8′23″W	Waco	1984	1008 Jefferson (10th & Jefferson), Waco
Flowers House		12121	600 W. Third St. 31°17′51″N 97°15′27″W	Eddy	1998	600 W. Third Street
Forsgard House†	More images	12905	1122 N. Fourth St. 31°33′51″N 97°8′24″W	Waco	2002	1122 North Fourth
Fort House†	More images	1990	503 S. Fourth St. 31°33′14″N 97°7′35″W	Waco	1969	503 South 4th St.
George W. Carroll Science Hall		16017	1401 S. Fifth St. 31°32′47″N 97°7′13″W	Waco	2009	
Glenn and Mary Gulledge Crain House		12897	705 S. Adams St. 31°26′3″N 97°24′26″W	McGregor	2002	705 S. Adams St
Groppe Barn		2288	SE on private road from FM 3149 at Groppe Rd. 31°44′26″N 97°3′55″W	West	1991	From West, take Main St. south from center of town one mile, take Cemetery Rd. east, go 2.5 more miles to Barn
Groppe Building	More images	2289	130 N. Main St. 31°48′8″N 97°5′31″W	West	1983	130 N. Main (Corners of Main & Oak), West.
H. J. and Cora Hudson House		18674	306 S. Bordon St. 31°23′1″N 97°12′56″W	Lorena	2017	Behind sidewalk in front (to the east) of the H. J. and Cora Hudson House on 306 South Bordon Street in Lorena, Texas
H. & T. C. Railroad		2311	Off S. Martin Luther King, Jr. Blvd. between Taylor St. and E. Bridge St. 31°33′45″N 97°7′30″W	Waco	1966	N/A
Hill House		2483	901 Ave. E 31°18′20″N 97°21′46″W	Moody	1989	901 Ave. E, Moody
Hoyle Cabin		2507	421 Rice Ave. 31°34′43″N 97°9′10″W	Waco	1963	421 Rice Ave on western edge of Cameron Park in Waco (on private property)
Johnson-Taylor House		2838	1705 N. Fifth St. 31°34′5″N 97°8′47″W	Waco	1963	1705 N. 5th St., Waco (corner of 5th & Garland); (also called Nell Pape Garden Center)
Kuykendall House		2978	300 Estelle Rice St. 31°18′26″N 97°21′51″W	Moody	1979	corner of Estelle Rice & Ave. F., Moody
Lorena United Methodist Church	More images	5372	205 S. Bordon St. 31°23′4″N 97°12′54″W	Lorena	1976	Corner of Borden & Bettie Sts., Lorena
Lusk House		3148	301 Jefferson Ave. 31°33′42″N 97°8′2″W	Waco	1965	301 Jefferson (3rd & Jefferson), Waco
McLennan County Courthouse†‡#	More images	3302	501 Washington Ave. 31°33′26″N 97°8′1″W	Waco	1970	Between 5th and 6th on Washington, Waco (Courthouse Square)
Old Main		16018	1411 S. Fifth St. 31°32′45″N 97°7′13″W	Waco	2009	
Old Walker Homestead		3829	3401 Dever Dr. 31°34′2″N 97°11′11″W	Waco	1969	
Rotan-Dosset House†	More images	4358	1503 Columbus Ave. 31°33′1″N 97°8′35″W	Waco	1978	1503 Columbus (15th & Columbus), Waco
Saint Paul's Episcopal Church		4482	501 Columbus Ave. 31°33′31″N 97°8′5″W	Waco	1963	501 Columbus (5th Columbus), Waco
St. James United Methodist Church		4444	600 S. Second St. 31°33′19″N 97°7′26″W	Waco	1986	600 S. 2nd (2nd & clay St.), Waco
Stratton-Stricker Building‡		18271	800 Austin Ave. 31°33′15″N 97°8′4″W	Waco	2015	Southwest corner of 8th and Austin, on sidewalk facing Austin Avenue
The C. C. McCulloch House†	More images	5397	406 Columbus Ave. 31°33′32″N 97°7′58″W	Waco	1979	(4th & Columbus), Waco
The Cottonland Castle‡		5314	3300 Austin Ave. 31°32′1″N 97°9′28″W	Waco	1977	3300 Austin Avenue
The George Butler - Jesse Harrison House		2154	1018 Taylor Ave. 31°34′12″N 97°7′9″W	Waco	1971	
The Howard House		5356	800 Ave. E 31°18′23″N 97°21′47″W	Moody	1978	800 Ave. E, Moody
The Isaac Jackson Teague Property		5358	172 Teague Dr. 31°17′50″N 97°21′47″W	Moody	1976	From Moody take 1/2 mile south on Highway 317, east of 317 and south of cemetery.
The Sims Cabin		5427	1020 Sleepy Hollow Rd. 31°30′16″N 97°14′1″W	Waco	1963	on private property in the Woodway Neighborhood, .
The Sturgis House‡		5433	1316 Washington Ave. 31°33′2″N 97°8′26″W	Waco	1971	across from St. Mary's
W. H. Janes Home		5672	N of FM 308 W of Fajkus Rd. 31°45′16″N 97°0′44″W	Leroy	1981	From Leroy 2 mi E on FM 2311, off-road on southside (private property)
Waco Theatre†‡	More images	5694	724 Austin Ave. 31°33′16″N 97°8′3″W	Waco	1981	
Watson Feed Store		15253	308 E. Texas Ave. 31°32′29″N 96°50′5″W	Mart	2003	
Wesley United Methodist Church		18221	125 Turner St. 31°34′6″N 97°7′22″W	Waco	2015	Northeast corner of Turner St and Elm, directly behind the old Bailsbondsman building on Elm St.

== McMullen County ==
Registered Texas Historic Landmark	Image	Marker number	Physical address	Nearest city	Year designated	Description
Dog Town Jail		1242	204 Elm St. 28°27′39″N 98°32′56″W	Tilden	1966	Behind courthouse, located at intersection of Highway 72 and Highway 16, Tilden.
Old Rock Store	More images	3799	502 River St. 28°27′41″N 98°32′59″W	Tilden	1966	Faces courthouse across from courthouse on Route 16 at intersection with Highway 72, Tilden.

== Medina County ==
Registered Texas Historic Landmark	Image	Marker number	Physical address	Nearest city	Year designated	Description
Arcadius Steinle House‡		186	1416 Florella St. 29°21′31″N 98°52′44″W	Castroville	1962	1416 Florella St.
Cordier-Tschirhart-Seal House‡		1058	1213 Isabella St. 29°21′29″N 98°52′34″W	Castroville	1976	Intersection of Paris/Isabella, Castroville.
Dolch-Hans Compound‡		13252	1213 Fiorella St. 29°21′26″N 98°52′37″W	Castroville	2004	1213-1215 Fiorella Street
Dubuis House‡	More images	1291	1207 Angelo St. 29°21′20″N 98°52′42″W	Castroville	1966	On Angelo Street across from St. Louis Church, Castroville.
F. Xavier Schmidt House‡	More images	1523	714 Lisbon St. 29°21′29″N 98°52′34″W	Castroville	1966	Corner of Lisbon and Naples, Castroville.
Family Home of George T. Briscoe		1566	402 W. Hondo Ave. 29°8′32″N 98°54′31″W	Devine	1977	402 West Hondo Street, Devine.
First Church in Castroville‡	More images	14895	1208 Angelo St. 29°21′19″N 98°52′43″W	Castroville	1966	
Fohn-Bless Store	More images	1934	1020 18th St. 29°20′55″N 99°8′26″W	Hondo	1974	1020 Eighteenth Street, Hondo.
Fred Metzger House		377	1003 16th St. 29°21′0″N 99°8′24″W	Hondo	1964	1003 Sixteenth Street, Hondo.
Gallagher Ranch House		2100	Private road south of SH 16 near Bexar County line 29°36′15″N 98°48′36″W	Helotes	1967	From San Antonio, take SH 16 about 23 mi NW to Bexar, Medina Co. Line-house on private property.
J. M. Koch's Hotel		12357	1906 Sacarosa Ave. 29°19′54″N 99°16′46″W	D'Hanis	2000	on FM 1796 (Main Street), 1 block north of US 90, D'Hanis
Landmark Inn†‡§#	More images	3031	402 Florence St. 29°21′16″N 98°52′28″W	Castroville	1965	Intersection of Highway 90 and Florence Street, Castroville.
Leinweber Building		3068	1706 Ave. M 29°20′57″N 99°8′31″W	Hondo	1986	M Street on downtown plaza, Highway 90, Hondo.
Louis Haller House‡	More images	3135	1307 Fiorella St. 29°21′28″N 98°52′39″W	Castroville	1976	Fiorella Street #1307, Castroville
Medina County Courthouse#	More images	3313	1100 16th St. 29°21′3″N 99°8′29″W	Hondo	1984	In Hondo, at intersection of Highway 16 and FM 462, Courthouse Square, Hondo.
Oefinger House		12538	2.7 mi. N of Quihi on FM 2676 29°25′24″N 99°1′3″W	Quihi vicinity	1994	2.7 miles north of Quihi on FM 2676
Old Wurzbach Place		3836	1 mi. N on CR 381 from FM 1957 29°26′50″N 98°48′36″W	Castroville	1967	From San Antonio, about 12 miles Southwest on Potranco Road, from Potranco Road take CR 381 North at one mile.
Rothe-Rowe Ranch House		4359	3.2 mi. N of D'Hanis W of FM 1796 29°22′18″N 99°17′10″W	D'Hanis	1972	(Inside Row Ranch up at house - on drive). From D'Hanis, about 3.2 miles north on FM 1796.
Schuehle-Saathoff House†		4606	CR 365 at CR 4512 29°23′49″N 99°0′30″W	Quihi	1996	CR 365 to CR 4512, walk down road at Pichot Ranch house on left
St. John the Evangelist Catholic Church		5040	2102 Ave. J 29°20′41″N 99°8′22″W	Hondo	1992	2102 Avenue J, Hondo.
St. Louis Catholic Church‡	More images	5051	1306 Angelo St. 29°21′21″N 98°52′47″W	Castroville	1970	Angelo, opposite Houston Square, Castroville.
St. Louis Church‡	More images	5053	1306 Angelo St. 29°21′21″N 98°52′47″W	Castroville	1966	Angelo Street, one of south block north from 90, Castroville.
Yancey United Methodist Church		12556	255 Church St. 29°8′21″N 98°8′34″W	Yancey	2001	

== Menard County ==
Registered Texas Historic Landmark	Image	Marker number	Physical address	Nearest city	Year designated	Description
Bank of Menard, 1903		297	101 W. San Saba Ave. 30°55′2″N 99°47′7″W	Menard	1964	at the corner of Bevans and San Saba Sts., Menard
Frisco Depot		2068	103 Frisco Ave. 30°55′27″N 99°47′5″W	Menard	1978	near the intersection of US 190 and US 83 in Menard
Menard County Courthouse†#	More images	14993	206 E. San Saba Ave. 30°54′55″N 99°47′2″W	Menard	2003	
Sacred Heart Catholic Church		4431	136 Bevans St. 30°54′59″N 99°47′8″W	Menard	1984	at the corner of Canal and Bevans Streets, Menard
Sentry Building†§			7066 FM 864 at Fort McKavett 30°49′42″N 100°6′20″W	Menard	1968	in Ft. McKavett from Menard take US 190 17 miles W to FM 864, take FM 864 SW 6 miles to Fort McKavett

== Midland County ==
Registered Texas Historic Landmark	Image	Marker number	Physical address	Nearest city	Year designated	Description
Bush, George W., Childhood Home†	More images	15411	1412 W. Ohio Ave. 32°0′2″N 102°5′24″W	Midland	2004	
Dorsey Home†	More images	1256	213 N. Weatherford St. 31°59′55″N 102°4′19″W	Midland	1962	213 N. Weatherford St., Midland
Lawrence Home		14438	1017 N. Loraine St. 32°0′30″N 102°4′34″W	Midland	1965	
Midland's First House		3369	1017 N. Loraine St. 32°0′30″N 102°4′34″W	Midland	1965	1017 North Loraine St., Midland
Petroleum Building		4002	214 W. Texas Ave. 31°59′55″N 102°4′36″W	Midland	1982	214 W. Texas, Midland
Scharbauer Hotel (destroyed)		14436	117 W. Wall St. 31°59′50″N 102°4′31″W	Midland	1965	
W. F. Scarborough Home,		5665	802 S. Main St. 31°59′24″N 102°4′29″W	Midland	1965	802 S. Main St., Midland
Yucca Theater		5935	208 N. Colorado St. 31°59′56″N 102°4′35″W	Midland	1981	208 N. Colorado St., Midland

== Milam County ==
Registered Texas Historic Landmark	Image	Marker number	Physical address	Nearest city	Year designated	Description
All Saints Episcopal Church		7937	200 N. Travis Ave. 30°51′8″N 96°58′41″W	Cameron	1987	1 block off US 190 on right-hand side of road
Buckholts SPJST Lodge Hall		15079	600 E. US 190 30°52′12″N 97°7′10″W	Buckholts	2008	600 E. Hwy 36
Dr. Nathan Cass House ("Ne Plus Ultra")†		7941	502 N. Travis Ave. 30°51′16″N 96°58′38″W	Cameron	1990	now called the Magnolia House; turn right at stop light on US 190
Green-Batte House		7977	201 E. Main St. 30°51′0″N 96°58′34″W	Cameron	1969	
International & Great Northern Railroad Passenger Depot†		13466	11 N. Main St. 30°39′16″N 97°0′4″W	Rockdale	2005	100 N Main St
Milam County Jail of 1895†#		14048	201 E. Main St. 30°51′0″N 96°58′34″W	Cameron	1978	lawn of museum on Fannin St.
R. F. and Minta Pool House†		12891	901 E. Eighth St. 30°51′12″N 96°58′0″W	Cameron	2002	901 East 8th St
Rainbow Tourist Camp and Courts		18116	915 E. Cameron Ave. 30°39′39″N 96°59′32″W	Rockdale	2015	
Sharp General Store	More images	8002	FM 487 at CR 410A 30°45′6″N 97°9′22″W	San Gabriel	1996	6 mi. NE on FM 486, 2 mi. W on FM 487
Sharp Presbyterian Church	More images	8003	13054 N. FM 487 30°45′3″N 97°9′35″W	Buckholts	1988	FR 487 approx. 14 mi. west of Rockdale; from MCR 407, 4 mi. east on FR 487
St. Monica's Catholic Church		7998	306 S. Nolan Ave. 30°51′3″N 96°59′10″W	Cameron	1983	
The B. J. and Sue Dollar Baskin Home		12988	202 E. Fifth St. 30°51′12″N 96°58′27″W	Cameron	2002	Cameron, 202 E. 5th
The Kay Theater		17630	352 N. Main St. 30°39′26″N 97°0′7″W	Rockdale	2013	
Wied Hardware Store		16508	413 W. Batte St. 30°50′52″N 96°58′53″W	Cameron	2010	
Williams-Atkinson Homestead		13691	FM 485 at N. CR 255 30°53′21″N 96°50′13″W	Maysfield	2006	1.5 mi E on SH 485, S on CR 255

== Mills County ==
Registered Texas Historic Landmark	Image	Marker number	Physical address	Nearest city	Year designated	Description
Hamilton-Soules House		13253	32 S. FM 1047 31°28′11″N 98°19′3″W	Star	2004	32 S FM 1047
Mills County Courthouse†#	More images	12916	1011 Fourth St. 31°26′59″N 98°34′10″W	Goldthwaite	2002	Courthouse, 1011 Fourth Street
Mills County Jail†#		3389	1000 Fifth St. 31°26′58″N 98°34′7″W	Goldthwaite	1965	Highway 183, Courthouse Square, Goldthwaitex

== Mitchell County ==
Registered Texas Historic Landmark	Image	Marker number	Physical address	Nearest city	Year designated	Description
All Saints' Church		119	304 Locust St. 32°23′22″N 100°51′47″W	Colorado City	1968	Third and Locust, Colorado City.
E.M. Hardigree Home		1314	305 Hickory St. 32°23′23″N 100°51′45″W	Colorado City	1967	305 Hickory Street, Colorado City.
F. M. Burns Home		1525	304 E. Fourth St. 32°23′27″N 100°51′50″W	Colorado City	1963	304 East Fourth Street, Colorado City.
First Baptist Church		1601	104 W. Market Ave. at Longfoot St. 32°24′22″N 100°42′45″W	Loraine	1967	Lightfoot and Market Streets, Loraine.
First Methodist Church		1742	333 Chestnut St. 32°23′25″N 100°51′53″W	Colorado City	1962	333 Chesnut, Colorado City.
John C. Prude Home		2770	334 E. Fourth St. 32°23′27″N 100°51′49″W	Colorado City	1979	334 East Fourth Street, Colorado City.
Majors Home†		3195	425 Chestnut St. 32°23′27″N 100°51′52″W	Colorado City	1966	425 Chesnut Street, Colorado City.
Old D.N. Arnett Home		3717	685 Chestnut St. 32°23′37″N 100°51′52″W	Colorado City	1968	685 Chestnut Street, Colorado City.

== Montague County ==
Registered Texas Historic Landmark	Image	Marker number	Physical address	Nearest city	Year designated	Description
1927 Montague County Jail†	More images	33	112 S. Grand St. 33°39′52″N 97°43′11″W	Montague	1991	Southeast corner of courthouse square, Montague.
Central Christian Church		789	300 Cooke St. 33°47′25″N 97°43′35″W	Nocona	1962	300 Cooke Street, Nocona.
Cumberland Presbyterian Church		15043	401 W. Pecan St. 33°33′47″N 97°51′0″W	Bowie	1962	
First Christian Church of Bowie		1708	E. Wise St.	Bowie	1963	E. Wise St. (not located)
Montague County Courthouse†	More images	17656	101 E. Franklin St. 33°39′52″N 97°43′12″W	Montague	2013	
St. Peter Lutheran Church	More images	5076	806 Lindsey St. 33°33′51″N 97°50′35″W	Bowie	1988	806 North Lindsey, Bowie.
The Phillips House		17563	900 S. Main St. 33°41′22″N 97°31′0″W	Saint Jo	2013	US Highway 82 in front of house facing highway, 0.1 miles from Saint Jo city limit sign.

== Montgomery County ==
Registered Texas Historic Landmark	Image	Marker number	Physical address	Nearest city	Year designated	Description
Bay's Chapel Methodist Church		7864	24790 Bays Chapel Rd. 30°36′12″N 95°48′46″W	Richards	1967	off SH 149
Cathalorri		7866	300 Prairie St. 30°23′24″N 95°41′39″W	Montgomery	1966	SH 105 E, 1 block east of SH 149
Crane Family Cabin		7870	770 Clepper Dr., Montgomery 30°23′34″N 95°41′23″W	Conroe	1974	
Davis Law Office		7874	14272 Liberty St. 30°23′22″N 95°41′47″W	Montgomery	1967	
Esperanza		7875	470 Esperanza Rd. 30°29′16″N 95°29′21″W	Willis	1963	Marker reported missing May 1985
First State Bank of Montgomery		7878	14343 Liberty St. 30°23′25″N 95°41′48″W	Montgomery	1970	
Frontier Colonial Home		7901	770 Clepper Dr. 30°23′33″N 95°41′25″W	Montgomery	1964	1 block south of SH 105 via Houston St., west on Rankin, Montgomery City Hall
J. S. Griffith Home		7879	202 Prairie St. 30°23′27″N 95°41′40″W	Montgomery	1963	
James Jordan (Jardine) Log House		7882	770 Clepper Dr., Montgomery 30°23′34″N 95°41′23″W	Conroe	1977	
M. B. Steger Home		7902	709 College St. 30°23′27″N 95°41′56″W	Montgomery	1978	
Magnolia		7885	801 College St. 30°23′26″N 95°41′58″W	Montgomery	1966	
Magnolia Depot		12233	426 Melton St. 30°12′35″N 95°44′59″W	Magnolia	1999	
Methodist Parsonage		7888	705 College St. 30°23′27″N 95°41′55″W	Montgomery	1965	
Montgomery Baptist Church Building		7889	301 Pond St. 30°23′23″N 95°41′51″W	Montgomery	1985	
N. H. Davis Cottage	More images	7873	14272 Liberty St. 30°23′22″N 95°41′47″W	Montgomery	1966	
Old Dr. Wm. P. Powell Home		7895	201 N. Wood St. 30°25′29″N 95°28′57″W	Willis	1967	
Reinhardt Homestead		7897	Comer Reinhart Rd. 30°9′29″N 95°12′0″W	New Caney	1991	US 59 and Loop 494, on corner Reinhardt Rd. north of New Caney
Simonton Home		15456	770 Clepper Dr. 30°23′33″N 95°41′25″W	Montgomery	1964	
Sunday-Moore House		7904	SW of Cook's Branch Conservancy beyond S end of Collier Cemetery Rd. 30°16′41″N 95°39′47″W	Montgomery	1982	7 mi. SE, Cook's Branch Conservancy, off Collier Cemetery Road and SH 105
The W. A. "Bay" Evans Home		7876	118 W. Pauline St. 30°19′11″N 95°27′28″W	Conroe	1984	
Thomas Chapel United Methodist Church		12608	512 W. Martin Luther King Blvd. 30°25′30″N 95°29′8″W	Willis	2001	corner of Martin Luther King Blvd. (Waverly St.) and Holland
William Womack Home		7912	4 mi. S on FM 149 30°20′29″N 95°42′1″W	Montgomery	1963	4 mi. south of Montgomery on SH 149
Willis Methodist Church		7911	200 N. Thomason St. 30°25′31″N 95°28′54″W	Willis	1965	
Wood-Valda Home		7913	303 Mason St. 30°23′28″N 95°41′43″W	Montgomery	1962	

== Moore County ==
There are currently no Recorded Texas Historic Landmarks listed within the county.

== Morris County ==
Registered Texas Historic Landmark	Image	Marker number	Physical address	Nearest city	Year designated	Description
Concord Meeting House		7844	260 CR 3306 33°9′45″N 94°47′33″W	Omaha	1966	off FM 144 west of Omaha about 3 mi. to Concord Church Rd.
Ned Walker Home		7861	11127 N. FM 144 33°9′12″N 94°45′21″W	Omaha	1967	FM 144 about 2 mi. SW of Omaha
Spring Hill Primitive Baptist Church of Christ		7858	CR 4201 E of SH 338 33°7′18″N 94°41′35″W	Daingerfield	1964	off US 259 on CR __ about 6 mi. north of Daingerfield

== Motley County ==
Registered Texas Historic Landmark	Image	Marker number	Physical address	Nearest city	Year designated	Description
Motley County Jail		3484	900 Main St. 34°0′55″N 100°49′19″W	Matador	1976	Stewart Street (FM 94), Matador
Roaring Springs Depot		4288	First St. at Broadway St. 33°53′55″N 100°51′20″W	Roaring Springs	1977	End of Broadway Street, Roaring Springs
Traweek House†		5555	927 Lariat Ave. 34°0′41″N 100°49′29″W	Matador	1964	927 Lariat Street, Matador

== Nacogdoches County ==
Registered Texas Historic Landmark	Image	Marker number	Physical address	Nearest city	Year designated	Description
Adolphus Sterne House†‡#	More images	14549	211 S. Lanana St. 31°36′0″N 94°39′2″W	Nacogdoches	1977	
Austin Building	More images	9245	2212 Alumni Dr. 31°37′19″N 94°38′58″W	Nacogdoches	1993	
Burrows - Millard House		9256	6020 North St. 31°39′43″N 94°39′25″W	Millard's Crossing	1976	north of Nacogdoches on Bus. 59
Chas. Hoya Land Office†‡	More images	9262	120 E. Pilar St. 31°36′8″N 94°39′21″W	Nacogdoches	1974	corner of Pilar and Pecan Sts.
Durst - Taylor House†‡	More images	9270	304 North St. 31°36′19″N 94°39′16″W	Nacogdoches	1994	
Gingerbread House		9274	316 Loop 34 31°29′56″N 94°20′55″W	Chireno	1965	Loop 34 of SH 21 in Chireno
Halfway Inn (Flournoy - Granberry House)	More images	9276	21457 SH 21 31°30′40″N 94°21′23″W	Chireno	1962	1 mi. W on SH 21 from junction FM 95 and SH 21, Chireno
Hotel Wiley		12098	116 S. D Ave. 31°49′25″N 94°29′25″W	Garrison	1999	
Ingraham Building‡		12099	210 E. Pilar St. 31°36′9″N 94°39′19″W	Nacogdoches	1998	
Lindsey House‡		9282	706 Virginia Ave. 31°35′57″N 94°39′40″W	Nacogdoches	1994	
Nacogdoches Federal Building / Post Office†‡	More images	12101	200 E. Main St. 31°36′10″N 94°39′18″W	Nacogdoches	1999	
Old Nacogdoches University Building†‡#	More images	9299	515 N. Mound St. 31°36′24″N 94°39′5″W	Nacogdoches	1962	515 N. Mound St., Washington Square
Old Stone Fort	More images	9393	1808 Alumni Dr. 31°37′10″N 94°38′56″W	Nacogdoches	1962	SFA University, on Alumni Dr.
Rusk Building	More images	12106	2008 Alumni Dr. 31°37′16″N 94°38′57″W	Nacogdoches	1998	
Sam P. Smith Place		9352	5986 E. Main St. 31°34′43″N 94°35′36″W	Nacogdoches	1985	about 4 mi. E of Nacogdoches on S side of SH 21
The Millard - Lee House		9285	6020 North St. 31°39′41″N 94°39′24″W	Millard's Crossing	1974	N of Nacogdoches on Bus. 59 at Millard's Crossing
The Roland Jones House†‡	More images	9280	141 N. Church St. 31°36′13″N 94°39′10″W	Nacogdoches	1973	
The Sparks House		9353	433 Phillips Rd. 31°32′4″N 94°40′12″W	Nacogdoches	1976	on FM 2863, 3 mi. S of Loop 224, Nacogdoches
Tol Barret House†		9249	433 Phillips Rd. 31°32′9″N 94°40′1″W	Nacogdoches	1981	
Zion Hill First Baptist Church‡	More images	9403	324 N. Lanana St. 31°36′18″N 94°38′56″W	Nacogdoches	1977	Corner of Boisdarc and LaNana Sts.

== Navarro County ==
Registered Texas Historic Landmark	Image	Marker number	Physical address	Nearest city	Year designated	Description
Beauford Halbert Jester Home		7218	1508 Sycamore Ave. 32°5′32″N 96°29′2″W	Corsicana	1968	
Britton Dawson Home		11612		Dawson	1977	Burned Down
Dunn-Ransom Home‡		11618	1303 W. Fourth Ave. 32°5′19″N 96°28′40″W	Corsicana	1981	
First Methodist Church	More images	7198	320 N. 15th St. 32°5′36″N 96°28′16″W	Corsicana	1967	
Frost Methodist Church		7203	121 E. North Front St. 32°4′47″N 96°48′22″W	Frost	1990	
George Taylor Jester		7219	609 W. Seventh Ave. 32°5′19″N 96°28′8″W	Corsicana	1967	
Holman Home‡		7211	212 N. 30th St. 32°5′4″N 96°29′10″W	Corsicana	1983	
Indian Trading Post		7216	912 W. Park Ave. 32°5′41″N 96°28′34″W	Corsicana	1962	
Jester-Butler House		12113	1522 Sycamore Ave. 32°5′31″N 96°29′4″W	Corsicana	1997	
Johnson-McCammon House		7220	420 W. Sixth Ave. 32°5′27″N 96°28′3″W	Corsicana	1992	
L. P. Hodge Home		7214	Rice Rd. in Chatfield 32°14′27″N 96°24′50″W	Corsicana	1963	
Lemon-Edens House‡	More images	7225	745 W. Third Ave. 32°5′31″N 96°28′26″W	Corsicana	1983	
Navarro County Courthouse†#	More images	7236	300 W. Third Ave. 32°5′43″N 96°28′5″W	Corsicana	1983	
Old Welding Shop of H. C. Nicol		7239	418 S. 12th St. 32°5′21″N 96°27′50″W	Corsicana	1968	Petroleum Industry Park, 400 block of S. 12th St.
Roger Q. Mills Home‡		7230	1200 W. Second Ave. 32°5′33″N 96°28′39″W	Corsicana	1967	
Senator James H. Woods Home		11650	504 W. Second Ave. 32°5′43″N 96°28′15″W	Corsicana	1967	Corner of W 2nd and N 14th at 504 W. Second Ave
Squire Josiah Daniel Home		12551		Kerens vicinity	1963	7 mi. E of Kerens, 5 mi. off SH 31
Tatum Home‡		11640	729 W. Third Ave. 32°5′32″N 96°28′23″W	Corsicana	1983	
Temple Beth-El†#	More images	11642	208 S. 15th St. 32°5′22″N 96°28′6″W	Corsicana	1981	
The Scales-Fortson House		11633	220 N. 14th St. 32°5′34″N 96°28′10″W	Corsicana	1980	

== Newton County ==
Registered Texas Historic Landmark	Image	Marker number	Physical address	Nearest city	Year designated	Description
Autrey-Williams House†		11082	717 North St. 30°51′10″N 93°45′13″W	Newton	1981	1/2 mi. E of Courthouse on North St., Newton
Cade Building	More images	11108	142 SH 63 E 30°59′55″N 93°40′9″W	Burkeville	1993	SE Corner of SH 87 & SH 63, Burkeville on SH 63, (Burkeville ISD)
Newton County Courthouse†#		11121	110 Court St. 30°50′52″N 93°45′37″W	Newton	1974	
Stringtown Schoolhouse		12453	5385 FM 1414 30°54′5″N 93°37′41″W	Newton vicinity	2000	4 miles north of Newton on SH 87, then 5 miles north on FM 1414
W. H. Ford Male & Female College		11116	309 N. Rusk St. 30°50′53″N 93°45′35″W	Newton	1965	
Watson Chapel Methodist Church		11140	13080 SH 87 S 30°40′40″N 93°48′44″W	Bleakwood	1972	1 mi S of Bleakwood on SH 87

== Nolan County ==
Registered Texas Historic Landmark	Image	Marker number	Physical address	Nearest city	Year designated	Description
Davis House		1176	513 Pine St. 32°28′33″N 100°24′23″W	Sweetwater	1992	513 Pine Street -Sweetwater
Edward J. Hamner House		1399	509 E. Third St. 32°28′25″N 100°24′15″W	Sweetwater	1989	509 E. 3rd Street, Sweetwater (house gone/marker gone)
I.M. (Mose) and Margaret Newman House†		13013	309 Ragland St. 32°28′29″N 100°24′9″W	Sweetwater	2003	309 Ragland
R.A. Ragland House		4149	610 E. Third St. 32°28′26″N 100°24′10″W	Sweetwater	1979	610 East 3rd Street, Sweetwater (Pioneer Museum)
Ragland Building†‡		4165	113-117 E. Third St. 32°28′17″N 100°24′29″W	Sweetwater	1979	113-115-117 E. 3rd Street, Sweetwater
Simmons House		4701	810 E. Broadway Ave. 32°28′26″N 100°24′0″W	Sweetwater	1987	810 Broadway, Sweetwater
Sweetwater Municipal Auditorium‡		5164	400 Locust St. 32°28′22″N 100°24′30″W	Sweetwater	1982	400 Locust Street, Sweetwater
Trammell House		5551	1400 Sam Houston St. 32°27′16″N 100°24′22″W	Sweetwater	1996	1400 Sam Houston, Sweetwater

== Nueces County ==
Registered Texas Historic Landmark	Image	Marker number	Physical address	Nearest city	Year designated	Description
Boby's Residence (PL65 - now Merriman House)		14148	1521 N. Chaparral St. 27°48′22″N 97°23′44″W	Corpus Christi	1962	
Broadway Bluff Improvement†	More images	515	Roughly bounded by Upper and Lower Broadway Sts., I-37, Mann and Mesquite Sts. 27°47′48″N 97°23′46″W	Corpus Christi	1986	Peoples Street at Broadway, Corpus Christi
Centennial House†	More images	780	411 N. Upper Broadway St. 27°47′37″N 97°23′48″W	Corpus Christi	1966	411 N. Upper Broadway, Corpus Christi
Corpus Christi Cathedral		1065	505 N. Upper Broadway St. 27°47′40″N 97°23′49″W	Corpus Christi	1991	505 North Upper Broadway
First Presbyterian Church of Corpus Christi		1832	435 S. Upper Broadway St. 27°47′19″N 97°23′49″W	Corpus Christi	1989	435 South Broadway, Corpus Christi
First United Methodist Church of Robstown		12986	107 N. Fourth St. 27°47′25″N 97°39′54″W	Robstown	2002	Robstown, 107 N. 4th
French-Galvan House		2059	1601 N. Chaparral St. 27°48′23″N 97°23′46″W	Corpus Christi	1986	Heritage Park, 1513 North Chaparrel, Corpus Christi
Grande-Grossman House		2251	1517 N. Chaparral St. 27°48′22″N 97°23′45″W	Corpus Christi	1985	Heritage Park, 1513 North Chaparral, Corpus Christi
Grossman-Graham House		12128	821 Oak Park Ave. 27°47′58″N 97°26′9″W	Corpus Christi	1999	
Hotel Brendle		2571	601 E. Ave. A 27°47′17″N 97°39′41″W	Robstown	1984	601 East Avenue A, Robstown
Julius Lichtenstein House†	More images	6323	1617 N. Chaparral St. 27°48′25″N 97°23′44″W	Corpus Christi	1976	Heritage Park, 1513 North Chaparral, Corpus Christi
Nueces County Courthouse of 1914†#	More images	3621	1100 N. Mesquite St. 27°48′6″N 97°23′45″W	Corpus Christi	1976	North Mesquite and IH 37, Corpus Christi
Nuecestown Schoolhouse		3626	11429 Leopard St. 27°50′52″N 97°35′29″W	Corpus Christi	1983	11429 Leopard Street, Corpus Christi
Old Saint Anthony's Catholic Church†	More images	8332	3918 CR 61 27°46′57″N 97°35′40″W	Robstown	1978	SH 44 and south Violet Road, from Robstown take SH 44 about 4 miles east
Richard King House†		18484	611 S. Upper Broadway 27°47′14″N 97°23′49″W	Corpus Christi	2016	
Sidbury House†	More images	4691	1609 N. Chaparral St. 27°48′25″N 97°23′44″W	Corpus Christi	1976	Heritage Park, 1513 North Chaparral, Corpus Christi
Simon Gugenheim House†	More images	6319	1601 N. Chaparral St. 27°48′24″N 97°23′43″W	Corpus Christi	1976	Heritage Park, 1513 North Chaparral, Corpus Christi
Temple Beth El		12997	1315 Craig St. 27°46′48″N 97°24′17″W	Corpus Christi	2003	Craig and 11th streets
Wynn Seale Junior High School†	More images	5915	1701 Ayers St. 27°46′12″N 97°24′12″W	Corpus Christi	1986	1707 Ayers Street, Corpus Christi

== Ochiltree County ==
Registered Texas Historic Landmark	Image	Marker number	Physical address	Nearest city	Year designated	Description
First Sanitarium		1861	221 S. Baylor St. 36°23′52″N 100°48′19″W	Perryton	1962	221 S. Baylor, Perryton
Old Blasingame Home		3691	1001 S. Cedar St. 36°23′24″N 100°47′54″W	Perryton	1987	1001 S. Cedar, Perryton

== Oldham County ==
Registered Texas Historic Landmark	Image	Marker number	Physical address	Nearest city	Year designated	Description
LS Alamosa Ranch Headquarters		2989	S. of RM 1061 one mile E. of US 385 35°29′41″N 102°13′27″W	Vega	1975	North of Vega on private property, Alamosa Ranch.
Tascosa Courthouse, 1884.		5201	Just beyond E. end of Texas State Highway Spur 233 at Cal Farley's Boys Ranch 35°31′55″N 102°15′22″W	Vega	1965	on Boys Ranch, from Vega take US 385 about 24 miles to north

== Orange County ==
Registered Texas Historic Landmark	Image	Marker number	Physical address	Nearest city	Year designated	Description
Bland-Bazzano House		11472	601 N. 12th St. 30°5′43″N 93°44′34″W	Orange	1981	
Cow Bayou Swing Bridge†		16525	SH 73 / SH 87 over Cow Bayou 30°2′42″N 93°49′15″W	Bridge City	2010	SH73/87, 1.13 mi. N.E. of jct. with FM 1442
Cox House		18169	612 W. Orange Ave. 30°5′50″N 93°44′7″W	Orange	2015	
Home of Jimmy O. Sims†		11517	905 Division Ave. 30°5′22″N 93°44′18″W	Orange	1979	
Jackson-Hustmyre House		11485	611 N. Seventh St. 30°5′45″N 93°44′13″W	Orange	1982	
Joe and Annie Lucas House†		11493	812 W. Pine Ave. 30°5′43″N 93°44′24″W	Orange	1992	
Jorgensen House		11487	1209 W. Pine Ave. 30°5′41″N 93°44′32″W	Orange	1994	
Lutcher Memorial Church Building†	More images	11496	902 W. Green Ave. 30°5′36″N 93°44′16″W	Orange	1978	
The Howell-Linscomb Home		11484	1212 W. Pine Ave. 30°5′43″N 93°44′32″W	Orange	1981	
The Neyland-Gilmer House		11499	312 W. Pine Ave. 30°5′43″N 93°43′55″W	Orange	1979	
W. H. Stark House†	More images	11519	611 W. Green Ave. 30°5′34″N 93°44′7″W	Orange	1976	
Woodmen of the World Lodge Building		11556	110 S. Border St. 30°5′21″N 93°44′15″W	Orange	1993	across from Courthouse

== Palo Pinto County ==
Registered Texas Historic Landmark	Image	Marker number	Physical address	Nearest city	Year designated	Description
First Christian Church		1700	Elm St. between S. Seventh St. and S. Eighth St. 32°45′58″N 98°18′9″W	Palo Pinto	1968	South 7th and W. Elm Street, Palo Pinto
Home of Stephen Bethel Strawn		5104	721 Hinkson Ave. 32°33′30″N 98°29′57″W	Strawn	1973	Corner of Binney and Hinkson Sts., Strawn
Mineral Wells High School	More images	12424	101 NW Fifth Ave. 32°48′34″N 98°7′5″W	Mineral Wells	2001	Damaged by fire in 2022
Robinson School		12525	6 mi. N of town on SH 16 32°38′1″N 98°28′39″W	Strawn vicinity	2001	6 miles north of Strawn on SH 16
Rock Schoolhouse	More images	4320	201 NW Fifth Ave. 32°48′36″N 98°7′5″W	Mineral Wells	1987	100 block of NW 5th Avenue, Mineral Wells
Strawn City Hall		5138	118 E. Housley St. 32°33′7″N 98°29′50″W	Strawn	1994	118 East Housley, Strawn
Thomas House		12708	715 Central Ave. 32°33′28″N 98°29′53″W	Strawn	2002	715 Central Avenue (SH 16)
Weatherford, Mineral Wells & Northwestern Railway Depot†	More images	5733	403 S. Oak Ave. 32°48′22″N 98°6′41″W	Mineral Wells	1985	300th block South Oak Street, Mineral Wells

== Panola County ==
Registered Texas Historic Landmark	Image	Marker number	Physical address	Nearest city	Year designated	Description
Old Panola County Jail†#		10838	213 N. Shelby St. 32°9′29″N 94°20′20″W	Carthage	1967	213 N. Shelby, Carthage
Woods Methodist Church†		10851	383 CR 425 32°0′24″N 94°14′50″W	Woods	1970	12 mi. S of Carthage on US 59 to CR 425, E .25 mi. to church in Woods Community

== Parker County ==
Registered Texas Historic Landmark	Image	Marker number	Physical address	Nearest city	Year designated	Description
1933 Weatherford City Hall‡	More images	35	119 Palo Pinto St. 32°45′31″N 97°47′56″W	Weatherford	1987	100 block of Palo Pinto Street, Weatherford
Chandor Gardens†	More images	16883	711 W. Lee Ave. 32°45′16″N 97°48′28″W	Weatherford	2011	711 West Lee St., Weatherford
Eureka Lodge No. 371, A. F. & A. M.		1508	101 N. Main St. 32°57′57″N 97°41′2″W	Springtown	1987	Corner of SH 51 (Main Street) and 1st Street -Springtown
First Plant of Acme Brick Company		1811	2350 Bennett Rd., Millsap 32°43′1″N 98°3′11″W	Weatherford	1966	From Weatherford, take US 80/I-20 west about 13.5 miles to FM 113. Take FM 113 about 1 mile north, then follow Bennett Road northwest about 3 miles.
First Plant of Acme Brick Company		3872	2350 Bennett Rd., Millsap 32°43′1″N 98°3′11″W	Weatherford	1966	From Weatherford take US80/I20 W about 13.5 miles to FM 113. Take FM 113 about 1 mile N, then follow Bennett Road NW about 3 miles
First United Methodist Church of Weatherford‡	More images	1899	301 S. Main St. 32°45′22″N 97°47′49″W	Weatherford	1979	S. Main Street at Columbia -Weatherford
Franco-Texan Land Company Building‡		17253	116 Houston Ave. 32°45′29″N 97°47′54″W	Weatherford	2012	Southwest Corner Weatherford Downtown Square
James Claude Wright House		17354	202 W. Oak St. 32°45′28″N 97°47′58″W	Weatherford	2012	
Millsap United Methodist Church		17997	402 Lamar St. 32°44′37″N 98°0′32″W	Millsap	2014	
Parker County Courthouse†‡#	More images	3939	1 Courthouse Sq. 32°45′32″N 97°47′50″W	Weatherford	1965	Courthouse Square, College Street at US 180, one on west side, one on east side, Weatherford
R. W. Kindel House		4155	402 W. Spring St. 32°45′39″N 97°48′9″W	Weatherford	1975	402 W. Spring Street, Weatherford
Santa Fe Depot	More images	4576	401 Fort Worth Hwy. 32°45′33″N 97°47′36″W	Weatherford	1962	2 blocks east of courthouse on Fort Worth Street, Weatherford
Silver Creek United Methodist Church		4697	2200 Church Rd. 32°50′32″N 97°35′54″W	Azle	1983	From Azle, take FM 730 about 3.2 miles, turn south on Church Road and continue about 3 miles on 2200 block of Church Road.
Sunshine Special's "Ellsmere"		5153	3.5 mi. N on US 377 32°34′21″N 97°36′9″W	Cresson	1966	Pate Museum of Transportation, from Cresson take US 377 north about 3.5 miles to museum.
Texas Pythian Home		5266	1825 E. Bankhead Dr. 32°45′4″N 97°45′23″W	Weatherford	1985	1825 E. Bankhead Drive, 3 miles east of Weatherford.
Tucker House		17252	245 Tucker Dr. 32°50′47″N 97°39′48″W	Weatherford	2012	The site is on the west side of Tucker Drive, one mile north of Farm Road 730.
Twentieth Century Club		16456	321 S. Main St. 32°45′18″N 97°47′49″W	Weatherford	2010	NE corner of S. Main & E. Lee
Weatherford College Old Main Building	More images	15030	225 College Park Dr. 32°44′30″N 97°47′33″W	Weatherford	1964	Weatherford College, E. Park Ave.
Weatherford Post Office‡		5732	117 Fort Worth Hwy. 32°45′33″N 97°47′45″W	Weatherford	1988	117 Fort Worth Street, Weatherford
Woolfolk-McCall House		5904	202 S. Waco St. 32°45′26″N 97°47′58″W	Weatherford	1975	202 S. Waco, Weatherford

== Parmer County ==
Registered Texas Historic Landmark	Image	Marker number	Physical address	Nearest city	Year designated	Description
Bank Building, Old		15554	400 3rd St. 34°23′5″N 103°2′26″W	Farwell	1962	
First National Bank		1779	400 3rd St. 34°23′5″N 103°2′26″W	Farwell	1962	on west side of courthouse square-Farwell
Hopping-Aldridge House		2563	710 4th St. 34°22′47″N 103°2′22″W	Farwell	1984	710 4th Street, Farwell
Parmer County Courthouse		3947	401 3rd St. 34°23′5″N 103°2′22″W	Farwell	1962	Courthouse Square, south of US 84-Farwell

== Pecos County ==
Registered Texas Historic Landmark	Image	Marker number	Physical address	Nearest city	Year designated	Description
Annie Riggs Hotel‡		171	301 S. Main St. 30°53′0″N 102°52′43″W	Ft. Stockton	1966	301 S. Main (corner of Main and Callaghan Sts) Ft. Stockton
Courthouse, Jail and Zero Stone	More images	1096	103 W. Callaghan St. 30°52′58″N 102°52′47″W	Ft. Stockton	1966	In between Main and Nelson St. on James St. Ft. Stockton
First National Bank Building		6476	121 N. Main St. 30°53′10″N 102°52′45″W	Ft. Stockton	1983	Second and Main Sts. Ft. Stockton
Fort Stockton Guard House‡	More images	2021	301 E. 3rd St. 30°53′13″N 102°52′35″W	Ft. Stockton	1966	Corner of E. 3rd and Rooney Sts. Ft. Stockton
Fort Stockton Officers' Quarters‡	More images	2022	400 N. Williams St. 30°53′19″N 102°52′35″W	Ft. Stockton	1966	Near intersection of E. 5th and N. Williams Sts., Ft. Stockton
Grey Mule Saloon‡		2283	219 S. Main St. 30°53′1″N 102°52′44″W	Ft. Stockton	1966	219 S. Main (corner of Main and Callaghan Sts.)
Koehler's Saloon and Store‡		2971	100 blk. S. Spring Dr. 30°53′4″N 102°52′36″W	Ft. Stockton	1966	Spring Dr. across from Comanche Springs in Rooney Park Ft. Stockton
Oldest House		3842	601 S. Nelson St. 30°52′51″N 102°52′50″W	Ft. Stockton	1966	Corner of Sherer and Nelson Sts. Ft. Stockton
St. Joseph's Catholic Church		5048	403 S. Main St. 30°52′57″N 102°52′44″W	Ft. Stockton	1966	Corner of James and Main St., Ft. Stockton
St. Stephen's Episcopal Church‡		4488	300 blk. E. 2nd St. 30°53′10″N 102°52′32″W	Ft. Stockton	1966	Corner of E 2nd and Spring Rd
Telegraph Office & School		5218	201 W. Gallagher St. 30°52′54″N 102°52′50″W	Ft. Stockton	1966	Corner of Gallagher and Nelson St., FT. Stockton 201 W. Gallagher St.
Young's Store‡		5930	201 E. Callaghan St. 30°53′1″N 102°52′40″W	Ft. Stockton	1966	Corner of Callaghan and Spring Dr., Ft. Stockton

== Polk County ==
Registered Texas Historic Landmark	Image	Marker number	Physical address	Nearest city	Year designated	Description
Augustus Darby Home		10398	N side of FM 350 E of Old Berring Rd. 30°54′32″N 94°54′13″W	Moscow	1964	5 mi W of Moscow on FM 350 *on private property - locked gate*
Bethel Baptist Church		10385	8815 FM 350 N 30°50′21″N 94°59′15″W	Bold Springs	1966	from Livingston take FM 350 about 9 miles NW to Bold Springs, church is on west side of road, just north of intersection w/ FM 942
Birthplace of Margo Jones		10401	517 S. Washington Ave. 30°42′17″N 94°55′57″W	Livingston	1967	517 S. Washington, Livingston
Davison Home		7427	307 N. Beatty St. 30°42′37″N 94°56′6″W	Livingston	1966	
E. C. Matthews Home		10409	477 Loop 177 30°55′4″N 94°49′41″W	Moscow	1966	on Loop 177, south of FM 350, .25 mi. west of US 59, Moscow
First Baptist Church		10414	13994 N. Old Hwy. 35 30°55′13″N 94°49′38″W	Moscow	1965	on Loop 177, just north of FM 350, .25 mi. west of US 59, Moscow
First National Bank		10394	308 W. Church St. 30°42′41″N 94°56′8″W	Livingston	1967	
G. G. Nettles Home		10417	434 Young St. 30°42′15″N 94°55′41″W	Livingston	1966	400 block of E. Young St., Livingston
Goodrich School	More images	17001	234 Katie Simpson Ave. 30°36′23″N 94°56′42″W	Goodrich	2011	2 blocks south of 1988 on the east side of the street at the entrance to the auditorium
John C. Leggett House		10403		Livingston	1967	
John Kale House		10402		Livingston	1965	
Magee-Love Log House		10408		Goodrich	1970	private property - inaccessible
Moscow Baptist Church		14061	13994 N. Old Hwy. 35 30°55′13″N 94°49′38″W	Moscow	1965	
Moscow Masonic Male and Female Academy		10416	464 Loop 177 30°55′3″N 94°49′38″W	Moscow	1962	
Old Bean Place		10384			1964	
P. B. Maxey Home		10410	S side of Maxey Rd. E of Mollie St. 30°59′33″N 94°50′16″W	Corrigan	1968	from Corrigan take US 287 about 1 mi. west to Eden St., go south to Maxey Rd., take a right, follow road up - house is on left
Polk County Courthouse†#	More images	12712	101 W. Church St. 30°42′38″N 94°56′1″W	Livingston	2001	101 W. Church Street (US 190 at US 59 Bus.)
Site of Old Andress Inn		10382	109 W. Mill St. 30°42′36″N 94°56′0″W	Livingston	1967	109 W. Mill St., Livingston
The Sawyer House		10422	110 S. Oak Ave. 30°42′28″N 94°56′21″W	Livingston	1987	
Village of the Alabama and Coushatti Indians	More images	10381	PR 56 at US 190 30°43′10″N 94°40′13″W	Livingston	1962	16 mi. east of Livingston on US 190 at entrance to reservation
Whitehead Home		10431	End of Whitehead Rd. off E. Caney Loop S of FM 1745 30°53′57″N 94°38′18″W	Livingston	1967	

== Potter County ==
Registered Texas Historic Landmark	Image	Marker number	Physical address	Nearest city	Year designated	Description
Alice Victoria Ghormley Curtis House†		12162	1626 S. Washington St. 35°11′48″N 101°50′54″W	Amarillo	1997	
Avery and Mary Turner House		16993	1706 S. Polk St. 35°11′42″N 101°50′24″W	Amarillo	2011	1/2 Block north of Interstate 40, West side of Polk St.
Bivins Home†	More images	420	1000 S. Polk St. 35°12′11″N 101°50′17″W	Amarillo	1965	1000 Polk Street, Amarillo.
Bivins Library (PLATE 81)†		15215	1000 S. Polk St. 35°12′11″N 101°50′17″W	Amarillo	1965	
Canadian River		694	Cas Johnson Rd. at McBride Canyon Rd. W of SH 136 approx. 40 miles (64 km) NE of Amarillo 35°33′33″N 101°41′34″W	Amarillo	1967	From Amarillo, take SH 136 about 40 miles northeast to Alibates Road into National Park - marker is inside park property where main road forks.
Clarence and Lorraine Eakle House‡		902	2220 S. Tyler St. 35°11′16″N 101°50′33″W	Amarillo	1994	2220 South Tyler Street, Amarillo.
Eakle-Archer House‡		1332	2104 S. Polk St. 35°11′27″N 101°50′27″W	Amarillo	1994	2104 South Polk Street, Amarillo.
Edward L. and Margaret Seewald Roberts House		18486	2211 S. Harrison St. 35°11′19″N 101°50′35″W	Amarillo	2016	East side of 2200 block of South Harrison Street, fifth house south of SW 22nd Avenue
Fisk Medical Arts Building†	More images	16911	724 S. Polk St. 35°12′21″N 101°50′16″W	Amarillo	2011	Corner of West Eighth Avenue and South Polk Street
H. B. Sanborn House†		2312	1311 S. Madison St. 35°11′59″N 101°50′25″W	Amarillo	1971	1311 South Madison Street, Amarillo.
H. W. and Katie Galbraith House		2316	1710 S. Polk St. 35°11′41″N 101°50′24″W	Amarillo	1991	1710 South Polk, Amarillo.
Herring-Crudgington House‡		2464	1710 S. Tyler St. 35°11′42″N 101°50′28″W	Amarillo	1991	1710 South Tyler, Amarillo.
Houghton House†‡		2579	1700 S. Polk St. 35°11′42″N 101°50′22″W	Amarillo	1981	1700 Polk Street (Junior League Headquarters), Amarillo.
Mary (Masterson) and John Fain House‡		3234	2405 S. Van Buren St. 35°11′13″N 101°50′40″W	Amarillo	1994	2405 South Van Buren, Amarillo
McBride Ranch House†		3274	McBride Canyon Rd. entering Alibates Flint Quarries Natl. Mon. 35°32′29″N 101°43′44″W	Amarillo	1971	
Northwest Texas Hospital School of Nursing†		3612	2209 SW 6th Ave. 35°12′32″N 101°55′39″W	Amarillo	1997	2209 West 6th, Amarillo
Old First Baptist Church		3728	1200 S. Tyler St. 35°12′6″N 101°50′23″W	Amarillo	1964	1200 Tyler Street, Amarillo.
Ordway Hall†	More images	14591	2201 S. Washington St. 35°11′20″N 101°50′53″W	Amarillo	2008	2201 S. Washington St.
Polk Street United Methodist Church†		17577	1401 S. Polk St. 35°11′56″N 101°50′17″W	Amarillo	2013	
Potter County Courthouse†		4096	501 S. Taylor St. 35°12′28″N 101°50′5″W	Amarillo	1996	501 South Taylor, Amarillo
Potter County Library†		4097	519 S. Taylor St. 35°12′30″N 101°50′7″W	Amarillo	1997	519 South Taylor Street, Amarillo
Russell Gymnasium†	More images	15442	2221 S. Washington St. 35°11′16″N 101°50′53″W	Amarillo	2008	
Santa Fe Building†	More images	4574	900 S. Polk St. 35°12′16″N 101°50′15″W	Amarillo	1997	900 South Polk Street, Amarillo
Shuford-Killough House		4690	1608 S. Polk St. 35°11′48″N 101°50′23″W	Amarillo	1991	1608 South Polk Street, Amarillo.
Smith-Rogers House		14056	4841 SW Ninth Ave. 35°12′20″N 101°53′35″W	Amarillo	2008	4841 SW 9th Ave.

== Presidio County ==
Registered Texas Historic Landmark	Image	Marker number	Physical address	Nearest city	Year designated	Description
Blackwell School		16572	501 S. Abbot St. 30°18′21″N 104°1′20″W	Marfa	2010	Marfa, 501 S. Abbot St.
Building 98, Fort D.A. Russell†‡		13284	705 W. Bonnie St. 30°18′11″N 104°1′39″W	Marfa	2004	705 W Bonnie St
El Fortin del Cibolo‡		1417	Cibolo Creek Ranch 29°51′43″N 104°20′1″W	Shafter	1992	SH 67, 5 miles N of Shafter go NW on private rd. about 4 mile
El Paisano Hotel†		1422	207 N. Highland Ave. 30°18′44″N 104°1′19″W	Marfa	1979	Texas and North Highland Streets., Marfa
Humphris-Humphreys House		2597	110 W. San Antonio St. 30°18′34″N 104°1′17″W	Marfa	1996	
Hunter Gymnasium		16579	300 N. Gonzales St. 30°18′44″N 104°1′34″W	Marfa	2010	Northeast corner of Lincoln St. and Gonzales (formerly known as N. Hill St.)
Presidio County Courthouse†#	More images	4117	Public square 30°18′48″N 104°1′20″W	Marfa	1964	SH 17 North at Highland Rd., Marfa
St. Paul's Episcopal Church		18213	101 E. Washington St. 30°18′51″N 104°1′19″W	Marfa	2015	

== Rains County ==
Registered Texas Historic Landmark	Image	Marker number	Physical address	Nearest city	Year designated	Description
Rains County Courthouse†#	More images	13149	167 E. Quitman St. 32°52′28″N 95°45′53″W	Emory	2002	Emory, 167 Quitman Street
The Amis House		10854	304 E. Quitman St. 32°52′26″N 95°45′48″W	Emory	1985	

== Randall County ==
Registered Texas Historic Landmark	Image	Marker number	Physical address	Nearest city	Year designated	Description
Amarillo Globe Dream House†		14097	3104 S. Harrison St. 35°10′49″N 101°50′36″W	Amarillo	2008	
Buffalo Courts		13952	102 N. 25th St. 34°59′0″N 101°54′56″W	Canyon	2007	
C.R. Burrow House		15779	1110 5th Ave. 34°58′43″N 101°55′59″W	Canyon	2009	
First National Bank Building		14757	400 15th St. 34°58′47″N 101°55′45″W	Canyon	2005	SW corner of 15th St. & 4th Ave.
L. T. Lester Home†		2983	310 8th St. 34°58′49″N 101°56′13″W	Canyon	1967	310 8th Street, Canyon
Palisades State Park Concession Building		17928	100 Brentwood Rd. 35°3′47″N 101°48′41″W	Canyon	2014	South on Osage off of TX 1151 approximately 2 miles to Starlight Canyon gate.
Panhandle-Plains Museum#		3930	2503 4th Ave. 34°58′49″N 101°55′2″W	Canyon	1970	4th Avenue & 25th Street -Canyon
Presbyterian Church Building		4114	1319 5th Ave. 34°58′45″N 101°55′49″W	Canyon	1990	1319 5th Avenue, Canyon
Randall County Courthouse	More images	4189	1516 5th Ave. 34°58′46″N 101°55′42″W	Canyon	1965	Courthouse Square, 4th Avenue & 15th Street -Canyon
Sam Wood Cabin		4508	2503 4th Ave. on E lawn of museum 34°58′50″N 101°54′59″W	Canyon	1966	located at Panhandle-Plains Museum, in Canyon, Randall County
Shaw-Keiser House		13993	1214 5th Ave. 34°58′43″N 101°55′54″W	Canyon	2007	1214 5th St.
Slemp-Cash House		24170	3205 S. Hughes St. 35°N 101°W	Amarillo	2024	3205 S Hughes St.
T-Anchor Ranch Headquarters		5174	2503 4th Ave. on E lawn of museum 34°58′50″N 101°54′59″W	Canyon	1967	Located outside Panhandle Plains Museum (4th Avenue) on eastern grounds, Canyon.
Terry and Georgie Sneed Thompson House		15627	3002 S. Ong St. 35°10′54″N 101°51′9″W	Amarillo	2003	
The Little House of Fellowship		16500	308 17th St. 34°58′49″N 101°55′32″W	Canyon	2010	northwest corner of 17th St. and 4th Avenue

== Reagan County ==
Registered Texas Historic Landmark	Image	Marker number	Physical address	Nearest city	Year designated	Description
John E. Gardner Place		2776	Santa Rita Rd. via RR 1676 and US 67 5 mi from Big Lake 31°11′18″N 101°32′45″W	Big Lake	1964	from Big Lake go about 4 miles west on US 67, then 1 mile south on RR 1676 to Santa Rita Rd - Marker is on Private Property about 1/2 mile south off Santa Rita Rd.
Stiles Courthouse†#		5122	SH 137 19 mi. NW of Big Lake 31°24′23″N 101°33′58″W	Stiles	1969	on SH 137 about 19 miles northwest of Big Lake

== Real County ==
Registered Texas Historic Landmark	Image	Marker number	Physical address	Nearest city	Year designated	Description
Real County Courthouse	More images	11692	146 S. Market St. 29°43′35″N 99°45′44″W	Leakey	2000	4th Street, Courthouse Square, Leakey

== Red River County ==
Registered Texas Historic Landmark	Image	Marker number	Physical address	Nearest city	Year designated	Description
Andrew Thompson House		10895	706 N. Walnut St. 33°36′56″N 95°3′6″W	Clarksville	1984	
Col. Charles DeMorse Home†	More images	10874	115 E. Comanche St. 33°36′46″N 95°2′58″W	Clarksville	1962	
First Christian Church of Detroit	More images	10876	155 First St. NW 33°39′48″N 95°16′3″W	Detroit	1984	
First Presbyterian Church of Clarksville		10877	106 S. Pecan St. 33°36′37″N 95°3′8″W	Clarksville	1966	
First Presbyterian Church of Clarksville		14980	106 S. Pecan St. 33°36′37″N 95°3′8″W	Clarksville	1966	
John Nance Garner Home	More images	10879	200 S. Main St. 33°39′36″N 95°15′57″W	Detroit	1971	
McKenzie Home		14685	CR 1287 33°35′27″N 95°6′27″W	Clarksville	1963	
Old W. L. Nunnely Home		10887	507 S. Locust St. 33°36′28″N 95°2′56″W	Clarksville	1969	
Red River County Jail	More images	10888	W. Madison St. at N. Pecan St. 33°36′47″N 95°3′8″W	Clarksville	1983	
Red River Courthouse†#	More images	10872	400 N. Walnut St. 33°36′47″N 95°3′4″W	Clarksville	1966	
St. Paul Methodist Church	More images	10892	403 W. Pierce St. 33°36′52″N 95°3′12″W	Clarksville	1971	

== Reeves County ==
Registered Texas Historic Landmark	Image	Marker number	Physical address	Nearest city	Year designated	Description
Mission Mary		16611	FM 3078 1 mi. W. of Toyah Creek 30°56′19″N 103°49′40″W	Balmorhea	2010	1 mile west of Toyah Creek on FM 3078
Old Camp Hospital		3699	1703 W. 4th St. 31°25′7″N 103°30′42″W	Pecos	1966	corner of 4th and Ross Sts.
Orient Hotel		3868	120 E. 1st St. 31°25′39″N 103°29′44″W	Pecos	1964	West of the Pecos Museum, Cedar & First streets
Vicinity of Significant Neighbors Ford Trail		5648	US 285 roadside park N. of Pecos 31°26′21″N 103°29′56″W	Pecos	1966	In Roadside Park on US 285, Northern City Limits of Pecos

== Refugio County ==
Registered Texas Historic Landmark	Image	Marker number	Physical address	Nearest city	Year designated	Description
John Howland Wood and Nancy Clark Wood House†		12168	533 Copano Bay Dr. 28°5′32″N 97°12′45″W	Bayside	1999	
Refugio City Hall		4231	613 Commerce St. 28°17′55″N 97°16′30″W	Refugio	1990	613 Commerce St., Refugio
T-C Ranch House		6479	Off U.S. 77 near San Antonio River		1972	US 77, 25 miles north of Refugio; Private - No Access
Woodworth House		5903	209 E. Purisima St. 28°17′50″N 97°16′30″W	Refugio	1976	209 E. Purisima St., Refugio

== Roberts County ==
Registered Texas Historic Landmark	Image	Marker number	Physical address	Nearest city	Year designated	Description
Roberts County Courthouse†#	More images	12593	301 E. Commercial St. 35°41′34″N 100°38′7″W	Miami	2000	

== Robertson County ==
Registered Texas Historic Landmark	Image	Marker number	Physical address	Nearest city	Year designated	Description
Adams-White Place		10896	1105 Magnolia St. 30°52′27″N 96°35′27″W	Hearne	1968	
Allen Hardware Store		10898	111 W. Third St. 30°52′50″N 96°35′43″W	Hearne	1968	
Barton Home‡		10902	404 Maple St. 30°59′3″N 96°40′6″W	Calvert	1979	
Church of the Epiphany‡		10913	504 E. Gregg St. 30°58′47″N 96°40′11″W	Calvert	1967	
Citizens Bank & Trust Co. Building‡		10914	516 Main St. 30°58′45″N 96°40′28″W	Calvert	1968	
Cobb's Market‡		10915	517 Main St. 30°58′44″N 96°40′30″W	Calvert	1967	
First Presbyterian Church‡		10923	401 E. Barton St. 30°58′56″N 96°40′23″W	Calvert	1967	
Former Calvert Courthouse†‡	More images	10906	604 Elm St. 30°58′51″N 96°40′13″W	Calvert	1968	between Burnett and Hanna
Franklin Carnegie Library†	More images	10925	315 E. Decherd St. 31°1′38″N 96°29′3″W	Franklin	1986	
Howard House‡		10931	404 E. Gregg St. 30°58′44″N 96°40′12″W	Calvert	1982	
Jacques Adoue Building‡		10897	506 Main St. 30°58′46″N 96°40′28″W	Calvert	1973	
Katy Hamman Stricker Library‡		13024	404 E. Mitchell St. 30°58′52″N 96°40′19″W	Calvert	2003	404 E Mitchell
Mistrot-Adoue House‡		10934	303 E. Mitchell St. 30°58′51″N 96°40′24″W	Calvert	1981	
Old Calvert Foundry and Manufacturing Company‡		10907	502 Main St. 30°58′46″N 96°40′29″W	Calvert	1969	
Old Cavitt Home	More images	15313	312 FM 391, Wheelock 30°53′52″N 96°23′43″W	Calvert	1964	
Old Cavitt House	More images	10911	312 FM 391 30°53′52″N 96°23′42″W	Wheelock	1964	.5 mi. west of Wheelock on FM 391
Philen House		10940	604 S. Magnolia St. 30°52′39″N 96°35′39″W	Hearne	1962	
Randolph-Field Place‡		10938	800 China St. 30°58′48″N 96°40′6″W	Calvert	1970	
Robert Cyrus Allen Home†		10899	402 Cedar St. 30°52′44″N 96°35′45″W	Hearne	1980	
Robertson County Courthouse†#	More images	10943	100 W. Decherd St. 31°1′37″N 96°29′14″W	Franklin	1968	
St. Mary's Catholic Church		10944	715 N. Main St. 31°10′19″N 96°40′20″W	Bremond	1969	FM 2954 and FM 2413
St. Paul United Methodist Church		12590	101 M.L. King, Jr. St. 30°58′52″N 96°40′46″W	Calvert	2001	Pecan St.at FM 979
St. Phillips Episcopal		10945	408 Cedar St. 30°52′43″N 96°35′45″W	Hearne	1979	Cedar and First St.
Stricker-Sneed House‡		10951	503 Pin Oak St. 30°58′56″N 96°40′13″W	Calvert	1973	

== Rockwall County ==
Registered Texas Historic Landmark	Image	Marker number	Physical address	Nearest city	Year designated	Description
Royse City Lodge No. 663, A.F. & A.M.†		6150	124 S. Arch St. 32°58′30″N 96°19′50″W	Royse City	1994	124 Arch Street (City Hall) Royse City
Royse City's First United Methodist Church Building		6149	701 E. Church St. 32°58′36″N 96°19′44″W	Royse City	1978	701 Church Street (corner of Church and Josephine Streets) off US 66 in Royse City

== Runnels County ==
Registered Texas Historic Landmark	Image	Marker number	Physical address	Nearest city	Year designated	Description
Abilene & Southern Depot		14601	300 blk. S. Seventh St. 31°44′10″N 99°56′42″W	Ballinger	1978	
Carnegie Library Building†#	More images	732	204 N. Eighth St. 31°44′23″N 99°56′59″W	Ballinger	1977	204 8th Street, Ballinger
First Presbyterian Church		1817	301 N. Broadway St. 31°44′30″N 99°56′57″W	Ballinger	1962	301 Broadway, Ballinger
First United Presbyterian Church		15515	301 N. Broadway St. 31°44′30″N 99°56′57″W	Ballinger	1962	
German Methodist Church/First Fire Station		2174	420 Strong St. 31°44′25″N 99°56′35″W	Ballinger	1962	420 Strong Street, Ballinger
Lynn - Hathaway Building		3151	800 Hutchings Ave. 31°44′16″N 99°56′55″W	Ballinger	1962	Corner of 8th and Hutchings (US 67)
Nancy Parker Cabin		3547	FM 382 near CR 190 32°2′37″N 99°45′18″W	Winters	1970	From Winters, take FM 1770 east 12 miles then FM 382 north about 4 miles
Old Cotton Oil Mill		3713	711 N. Melwood St. 31°57′57″N 99°57′34″W	Winters	1962	711 North Melwood Street, Winters
Oldest Rock Building in City		3844	307 Depot St. 31°38′55″N 100°2′59″W	Rowena	1967	Depot Street, Rowena
Rock Hotel		4317	300 W. Dale St. 31°57′28″N 99°57′57″W	Winters	1982	300 West Dale Street, Winters
Runnels County Courthouse		4392	613 Hutchings Ave. 31°44′18″N 99°56′45″W	Ballinger	1967	US Highway 83 and 67, Ballinger
St. Mary, Star of the Sea, Catholic Church		5064	608 N. Sixth St. 31°44′43″N 99°57′1″W	Ballinger	1984	608 6th Street, Ballinger
Theile Building†		5459	2nd & Robinson St. 31°35′54″N 100°11′0″W	Miles	1968	2nd and Robinson Streets, Miles
Winters State Bank		5873	101 N. Main St. 31°57′28″N 99°57′47″W	Winters	2001	Main and Dale Streets, Winters

== Rusk County ==
Registered Texas Historic Landmark	Image	Marker number	Physical address	Nearest city	Year designated	Description
Birdwell House		10960	11992 CR 4233 behind Monte Verdi Plantation house 31°54′6″N 94°52′16″W	Cushing	1967	
Crim, Elias Fleming and Mattie Spharler, House†	More images	15423	310 E. Main St. 32°9′10″N 94°47′43″W	Henderson	2003	
Dennard Home		10982	CR 3198 E of FM 95 31°55′1″N 94°34′38″W	Mount Enterprise	1984	5 mi. east of Mt. Enterprise via US 84 to FM 95 S .5 mi., then left on county road
Gaston Public School Complex		10998	CR 4133A 32°10′43″N 94°53′29″W	Joinerville	1992	6 mi. west of Henderson on SH 64
Hardeman-Griffin House		11000	313 E. Main St. 32°9′13″N 94°47′44″W	Henderson	1985	
Howard-Dickinson House		11005	501 S. Main St. 32°8′57″N 94°47′57″W	Henderson	1968	
Leverett House		11008	CR 133 W of SH 42 32°18′44″N 94°55′36″W	Overton	1962	
M. Kangerga & Bro.‡		11007	102 E. Main St. 32°9′10″N 94°47′58″W	Henderson	1990	
M. Kangerga House		11006	501 N. High St. 32°9′29″N 94°47′49″W	Henderson	1969	[NOTE: Mile (later Michael) Kangerga was born in Otocac, Croatia]
Mattie Trammel Schoolhouse		11075	600 N. High St. 32°9′34″N 94°47′45″W	Henderson	1992	
Monte Verdi†		11021	11992 CR 4233 31°54′6″N 94°52′15″W	Cushing	1964	
Old House of Dr. Wm. M. Ross		11053			1962	
Pine Grove Cumberland Presbyterian Church		11027	S of FM 2867 on CR 364 S 32°6′7″N 94°39′12″W	Henderson	1966	10 mi. E of Henderson via FM 840 to FM 2867, E until CR 364 S
Richardson-Lowe House		11052	N of US 84 W of FM 225 31°54′15″N 94°50′9″W	Laneville	1976	Glenfawn Road off FM 225, 6 mi. SW of Laneville
Rogers-Craig House		17291	1011 S. Main St. 32°8′36″N 94°47′57″W	Henderson	2012	From downtown square go about one mile down South Main St.
T. J. Walling Log Cabin	More images	11077	514 N. High St. 32°9′32″N 94°47′47″W	Henderson	1983	

== See also ==
Recorded Texas Historic Landmarks listed by county
Anderson-Callahan • Cameron-Duval • Eastland-Gray • Grayson-Hudspeth • Hunt-Martin • Mason-Rusk • Sabine-Travis • Trinity-Zavala
