= Elevation, Texas =

- Unincorporated community
- Location within Texas Location within the United States
- Coordinates: 30°39′13″N 96°49′8″W
- Country: United States
- State: Texas
- County: Milam
- Elevation: 538 ft (164 m)
- Time zone: UTC-6 (Central (CST))
  - Summer (DST): UTC-5 (CDT)
- Area codes: 512 & 737
- GNIS feature ID: 1379710

Elevation is an unincorporated community located in Milam County, Texas, United States. According to the Handbook of Texas, the community had a population of 12 in 2000.

== History ==
The Gulf, Colorado and Santa Fe Railway built a track through the area in 1881 and the community became a switch station here. It was given the name Elevation for the altitude on which it stands. Its population was 12 from 1990 through 2000.

== Geography ==
Elevation is located on Texas State Highway 36, 17 mi (27 km) southeast of Cameron, 12 mi (19 km) southeast of Rockdale, and 4 mi (6.4 km) southeast of Milano in southeastern Milam County.

== Education ==
Elevation is served by the Milano Independent School District.
