= Edna Westbrook Trigg =

American educator and social worker (1868–1946)

- Born: December 30, 1868; Milam County, Texas, US
- Died: November 15, 1946 (aged 77)
- Occupation(s): Educator, social worker

Edna Westbrook Trigg (December 30, 1868 – November 15, 1946) was an American educator and social worker.

== Biography ==
Trigg was born on December 30, 1868, in Milam County, Texas, between Milano and Cameron. She attended schools in Liberty, and received her teaching certificate in Cameron. She married Charles Letman Trigg in 1892, having 2 children.

In late 1911, Trigg was chosen by the United States Department of Agriculture to start a home demonstration clubs in Milam County. The club exhibited their tomatoes at the 1914 State Fair of Texas. The club shut down in 1915, due to lack of funding, but she continued with social work. She taught agriculture and canning to rural communities. During World War I, she started a drive to make Denton County food self-sufficient. She continued teaching agriculture until her death on November 25, 1946, aged 77. She was buried at the I.O.O.F. Cemetery, in Denton. She was honored with a Texas Historical Commission marker in the Denton County Courthouse-on-the-Square in October 1970.
