= Sharp, Texas =

- Unincorporated community
- Location within Texas Location within the United States
- Coordinates: 30°45′5″N 97°9′22″W
- Country: United States
- State: Texas
- County: Milam
- Elevation: 492 ft (150 m)
- Time zone: UTC-6 (Central (CST))
  - Summer (DST): UTC-5 (CDT)
- Area codes: 512 & 737
- GNIS feature ID: 1368061

Sharp is an unincorporated community located in Milam County, Texas, United States. According to the Handbook of Texas, the community had a population of 75 in 2000.

== Geography ==
Sharp is located on Farm to Market Road 487, 13 mi (21 km) southwest of Cameron, 8 mi (13 km) east of Davilla, and 12 mi (19 km) northwest of Rockdale in western Milam County.

== Education ==
In 1931, Sharp was the founding member of a school district along with Lilac, Duncan, and Oakville. They later joined the Rockdale Independent School District in 1960.
