= Pettibone, Texas =

- Unincorporated community
- Location within Texas Location within the United States
- Coordinates: 30°51′00″N 97°04′51″W
- Country: United States
- State: Texas
- County: Milam
- Elevation: 502 ft (153 m)
- Time zone: UTC-6 (Central (CST))
  - Summer (DST): UTC-5 (CDT)
- Area code: 254
- GNIS feature ID: 1380348

Pettibone is an unincorporated community in Milam County, Texas, United States. According to the Handbook of Texas, the community had a population of 25 in 2000.

== History ==
Pettibone was a flag stop on the Gulf, Colorado and Santa Fe Railway, which built a track through the area in 1881. It was subsequently named for a railroad official. Its population was 30 in 1933 then went down to 25 from 1990 through 2000.

== Geography ==
Pettibone is located on U.S. Highway 190, 5 mi (8.0 km) west of Cameron, 20 mi (32 km) northwest of Rockdale, and 27 mi (43 km) southeast of Temple in west-central Milam County.

It is also on Texas State Highway 36 and Farm to Market Road 486.

== Education ==
Today, the community is served by the Cameron Independent School District.
