= San Gabriel, Texas =

- Unincorporated community
- Location within Texas Location within the United States
- Coordinates: 30°41′40″N 97°11′46″W
- Country: United States
- State: Texas
- County: Milam
- Elevation: 417 ft (127 m)
- Time zone: UTC-6 (Central (CST))
  - Summer (DST): UTC-5 (CDT)
- Area codes: 512 & 737
- GNIS feature ID: 1367498

San Gabriel is an unincorporated community in Milam County, Texas, United States. According to the Handbook of Texas, it had a population of 100 in 2000.

== History ==
In 1990 and 2000, the community had a population of 100.

In 2010, Burning Flipside held an event at the Apache Pastures near San Gabriel.

The Sharp General Store in the community is listed on the National Register of Historic Places.

On April 6, 2019, an EF0 tornado struck the community, severely damaging a business.

== Geography ==
San Gabriel is located on Farm to Market Road 486, 17 mi (27 km) southwest of Cameron and 6 mi (9.7 km) north of Thorndale in western Milam County.

== Education ==
San Gabriel had two schools in the mid-1880s. The community served as a school district until it joined the Thorndale Independent School District in 1960.

== See also ==
- U.S. Route 79 in Texas
