= Minerva, Texas =

- Unincorporated community
- Location within Texas Location within the United States
- Coordinates: 30°45′30″N 96°59′17″W
- Country: United States
- State: Texas
- County: Milam
- Elevation: 404 ft (123 m)
- Time zone: UTC-6 (Central (CST))
  - Summer (DST): UTC-5 (CDT)
- Area codes: 512 & 737
- GNIS feature ID: 1362948

Minerva is an unincorporated community located in Milam County, Texas, United States. According to the Handbook of Texas, the community had a population of 60 in 2000.

== Geography ==
Minerva is located on U.S. Highway 77, 6 mi (9.7 km) south of Cameron, 41 mi (66 km) southeast of Temple, 52 mi (84 km) west of Bryan and College Station, and 68 mi (109 km) northeast of Austin in central Milam County.

== Education ==
Minerva is served by the Rockdale Independent School District. It joined that district and the Cameron Independent School District in 1949.

== Notable person ==
- C. R. Smith, American Airlines CEO, was born in Minerva.
