= Praesel, Texas =

- Census-designated place
- Location within Texas Location within the United States
- Coordinates: 30°37′52″N 97°0′36″W
- Country: United States
- State: Texas
- County: Milam

Area
  - Total: 5.23 sq mi (13.54 km^{2})
  - Land: 5.21 sq mi (13.50 km^{2})
  - Water: 0.015 sq mi (0.04 km^{2})
- Elevation: 453 ft (138 m)

Population (2020)
  - Total: 446
- Time zone: UTC-6 (Central (CST))
  - Summer (DST): UTC-5 (CDT)
- ZIP Code: 76567 (Rockdale)
- Area codes: 512, 737
- FIPS code: 48-59216
- GNIS feature ID: 2805818

Praesel is an unincorporated community and census-designated place (CDP) in Milam County, Texas, United States. It was first listed as a CDP in the 2020 census with a population of 446.

It is located in the southwestern part of the county, bordered to the north by Rockdale. Farm-to-Market Road 487 runs through the center of the CDP, leading north into Rockdale and south to U.S. Route 77, which forms the eastern edge of the CDP. US-77 leads north 18 miles (29 km) to Cameron and south 32 miles (51 km) to Giddings. Austin is 60 miles (97 km) to the southwest, and College Station is 53 miles (85 km) to the east.

== Demographics ==
Historical population
Census	Pop.	Note	%±
2020	446		—
U.S. Decennial Census; 1850–1900 1910; 1920 1930 1940; 1950 1960 1970; 1980 1990 2000; 2010 2020

Praesel first appeared as a census designated place in the 2020 U.S. census.

=== 2020 census ===
Praesel CDP, Texas – Racial and ethnic composition Note: the US Census treats Hispanic/Latino as an ethnic category. This table excludes Latinos from the racial categories and assigns them to a separate category. Hispanics/Latinos may be of any race.
Race / Ethnicity (NH = Non-Hispanic)	Pop 2020	% 2020
White alone (NH)	258	57.85%
Black or African American alone (NH)	14	3.14%
Native American or Alaska Native alone (NH)	1	0.22%
Asian alone (NH)	0	0.00%
Native Hawaiian or Pacific Islander alone (NH)	0	0.00%
Other race alone (NH)	1	0.22%
Mixed race or Multiracial (NH)	19	4.26%
Hispanic or Latino (any race)	153	34.30%
Total	446	100.00%

== Education ==
It is in the Rockdale Independent School District.
