= Clarkson, Texas =

Ghost town in Texas

- Unincorporated community
- Location within Texas Location within the United States
- Coordinates: 30°59′43″N 96°55′30″W
- Country: United States
- State: Texas
- County: Milam
- Elevation: 381 ft (116 m)
- Time zone: UTC-6 (Central (CST))
  - Summer (DST): UTC-5 (CDT)
- Area codes: 512 & 737
- GNIS feature ID: 1379553

Clarkson is an unincorporated community in Milam County, Texas, United States. According to the Handbook of Texas, the community had a population of 10 in 2000.

== History ==
A post office was established at Clarkson in 1889 and remained in operation until 1906. Its population was reported as 50 in the 1940s, a figure which declined to 10 from 1990 through 2000.

== Geography ==
Clarkson is located on Farm to Market Road 1445, 9 mi (14 km) northeast of Cameron in northern Milam County.

== Education ==
In 1903, Clarkson had a one-teacher school for 43 White students and a two-teacher school for 105 black students. They joined the Cameron Independent School District in the early 1950s.

== See also ==
- U.S. Route 77 in Texas
