= Maysfield, Texas =

- Unincorporated community
- Location within Texas Location within the United States
- Coordinates: 30°53′50″N 96°51′4″W
- Country: United States
- State: Texas
- County: Milam
- Elevation: 358 ft (109 m)
- Time zone: UTC-6 (Central (CST))
  - Summer (DST): UTC-5 (CDT)
- Area codes: 512 & 737
- GNIS feature ID: 1362341

Maysfield is an unincorporated community located in Milam County, Texas, United States. According to the Handbook of Texas, the community had a population of 140 in 1990, which did not see a change in figures in 2000.

== History ==
The Williams-Atkinson Homestead in the community was listed on the National Register of Historic Places in 2006.

== Geography ==
Maysfield is located on Farm to Market Road 485, 8 mi (13 km) northeast of Cameron in northeastern Milam County.

== Education ==
Maysfield schools joined the Cameron Independent School District in the early 1970s.
