= Liberty Hill, Milam County, Texas =

- Unincorporated community
- Location within Texas Location within the United States
- Coordinates: 30°40′26″N 97°8′36″W
- Country: United States
- State: Texas
- County: Milam
- Elevation: 413 ft (126 m)
- Time zone: UTC-6 (Central (CST))
  - Summer (DST): UTC-5 (CDT)
- Area codes: 512 & 737
- GNIS feature ID: 1380084

Liberty Hill is an unincorporated community located in Milam County, Texas, United States. According to the Handbook of Texas, the community had a population of 25 in 2000.

== History ==
The 1941 county highway map showed a church and several scattered houses in Liberty Hill. Its population was 25 from 1990 through 2000.

== Geography ==
Liberty Hill is located on Farm to Market Road 908, 8 mi (13 km) west of Rockdale in southwestern Milam County.

== Education ==
The community had its own school in 1941. Today, Liberty Hill is served by the Thorndale Independent School District.
