= Detmold, Texas =

- Unincorporated community
- Location within Texas Location within the United States
- Coordinates: 30°39′1″N 97°12′51″W
- Country: United States
- State: Texas
- County: Milam
- Elevation: 453 ft (138 m)
- Time zone: UTC-6 (Central (CST))
  - Summer (DST): UTC-5 (CDT)
- Area codes: 512 & 737
- GNIS feature ID: 1379658

Detmold is an unincorporated community located in Milam County, Texas, United States.

== History ==
The first settlers in Detmold were German.

== Geography ==
Detmold is located at the intersection of Farm to Market Roads 437, 443, and 486, 4 mi (6.4 km) north of Thorndale in western Milam County.

== Education ==
In 1903, Detmold had a school with one teacher and 38 students. It continued to operate in 1941 and joined the Thorndale Independent School District in 1946.
