= Baileyville, Texas =

- Unincorporated community
- Location within Texas Location within the United States
- Coordinates: 31°3′10″N 96°49′43″W
- Country: United States
- State: Texas
- County: Milam
- Elevation: 371 ft (113 m)
- Time zone: UTC-6 (Central (CST))
  - Summer (DST): UTC-5 (CDT)
- Area codes: 512 & 737
- GNIS feature ID: 1379379

Baileyville is an unincorporated community located in Milam County, Texas, United States. According to the Handbook of Texas, the community had a population of 45 in 1990.

== History ==
On February 11, 1950, a strong F2 tornado destroyed 10 homes. Five people were injured.

== Geography ==
Baileyville is located on Farm to Market Road 2027, 16 mi (26 km) northeast of Cameron and 31 mi (50 km) northeast of Rockdale in northern Milam County.

== Education ==
Baileyville joined the Rosebud-Lott Independent School District in the early 1970s.
