= Belmena, Texas =

Unincorporated community in Texas, United States

- Unincorporated community
- Location within Texas Location within the United States
- Coordinates: 30°54′32″N 96°54′31″W
- Country: United States
- State: Texas
- County: Milam
- Elevation: 361 ft (110 m)
- Time zone: UTC-6 (Central (CST))
  - Summer (DST): UTC-5 (CDT)
- Area codes: 512 & 737
- GNIS feature ID: 1379405

Belmena is an unincorporated community located in Milam County, Texas, United States. According to the Handbook of Texas, the community had a population of 15 in 2000.

== History ==
A post office was established at Belmena in 1900 and remained in operation until 1906. The 1941 county highway map showed several scattered homes and businesses in the community. Its population was 15 from 1990 through 2000.

== Geography ==
Belmena is located on Farm to Market Road 485, 5 mi (8.0 km) northeast of Cameron in north-central Milam County.

== Education ==
Belmena had its own school in 1941. Today, the community is served by the Cameron Independent School District.
