= Elm Ridge, Texas =

- Unincorporated community
- Location within Texas Location within the United States
- Coordinates: 30°50′52″N 97°2′29″W
- Country: United States
- State: Texas
- County: Milam
- Elevation: 479 ft (146 m)
- Time zone: UTC-6 (Central (CST))
  - Summer (DST): UTC-5 (CDT)
- Area codes: 512 & 737
- GNIS feature ID: 2034772

Elm Ridge is an unincorporated community located in Milam County, Texas, United States. According to the Handbook of Texas, the community had a population of 25 in 2000.

== History ==
The Gulf, Colorado and Santa Fe Railway built a track through Elm Ridge in 1881 and the community may have been established here. It was named for a nearby creek. The 1941 county highway map showed some scattered houses in the vicinity. Its population was 25 from 1990 through 2000.

== Geography ==
Elm Ridge is located on U.S. Highway 190, 4 mi (6.4 km) west of Cameron in central Milam County.

== Education ==
In 1903, Elm Ridge had a school with two teachers and 80 students. It continued to operate in 1941. Today, the community is served by the Cameron Independent School District.
