= Marlow, Texas =

- Unincorporated community
- Location within Texas Location within the United States
- Coordinates: 30°50′56″N 96°55′18″W
- Country: United States
- State: Texas
- County: Milam
- Elevation: 371 ft (113 m)
- Time zone: UTC-6 (Central (CST))
  - Summer (DST): UTC-5 (CDT)
- Area codes: 512 & 737
- GNIS feature ID: 2034840

Marlow is an unincorporated community located in Milam County, Texas, United States. According to the Handbook of Texas, the community had a population of 45 in 2000.

== History ==
The community was originally known as Devils Bend, but was renamed after Ben Marlow after he donated land for the establishment of a Baptist church, cemetery and school.

== Geography ==
Marlow is located a mile north of Farm to Market Road 2095 near the Little River, 3 mi (4.8 km) east of Cameron in central Milam County.

== Education ==
A school was built on Ben Marlow's land grant. In 1903, there were two schools in Marlow; one had two teachers and 72 White students and the other had one teacher and 57 Black students. They joined the Cameron Independent School District in the early 1930s.
