= Forest Grove, Milam County, Texas =

- Unincorporated community
- Location within Texas Location within the United States
- Coordinates: 30°32′47″N 96°59′59″W
- Country: United States
- State: Texas
- County: Milam
- Elevation: 430 ft (130 m)
- Time zone: UTC-6 (Central (CST))
  - Summer (DST): UTC-5 (CDT)
- Area codes: 512 & 737
- GNIS feature ID: 2034702

Forest Grove is an unincorporated community located in Milam County, Texas, United States. According to the Handbook of Texas, the community had a population of 60 in 2000.

== History ==
There is little history of Forest Grove, other than its being a rural church community. It had a population of 40 in 1966 and 60 from 1990 through 2000.

== Geography ==
Forest Grove is located on U.S. Highway 77, 7 mi (11 km) south of Rockdale in southern Milam County.

== Education ==
Today, the community is served by the Rockdale Independent School District.
