= Hoyte, Texas =

- Unincorporated community
- Location within Texas Location within the United States
- Coordinates: 30°47′6″N 96°54′56″W
- Country: United States
- State: Texas
- County: Milam
- Elevation: 472 ft (144 m)
- Time zone: UTC-6 (Central (CST))
  - Summer (DST): UTC-5 (CDT)
- Area codes: 512 & 737
- GNIS feature ID: 1379969

Hoyte is an unincorporated community located in Milam County, Texas, United States. According to the Handbook of Texas, the community had a population of 20 in 2000.

== History ==
John B. McLane granted the railroad land for a passing track and a wood-loading spur in 1900. The town had a modest depot and served as a flag stop for the rail route for a while. Hoyte's first post office opened in 1904, but was shut down in 1907. On county highway maps from 1941, a few dispersed residences identified the town. Twenty people lived in Hoyte in 1990. In 2000, the population was unchanged.

== Geography ==
Hoyte is located on U.S. Highway 190 on the Atchison, Topeka and Santa Fe Railway, 6 mi (9.7 km) southeast of Cameron in central Milam County.

== Education ==
Hoyte had its own school in 1941. Today, the community is served by the Cameron Independent School District.
