= Bushdale, Texas =

Ghost town in Texas, United States of America

Coordinates: 30.6830°N 97.0421°W

Bushdale, a former small German community, is now a ghost town in Milam County, Texas, United States, three miles north of Rockdale. The town never grew much during its "primetime", as Bushdale only contained a one-teacher school and a few businesses. The school was consolidated with Rockdale in 1949. Today, only the cemetery remains.
