= Jones Prairie, Texas =

- Unincorporated community
- Location within Texas Location within the United States
- Coordinates: 30°57′47″N 96°50′6″W
- Country: United States
- State: Texas
- County: Milam
- Elevation: 436 ft (133 m)
- Time zone: UTC-6 (Central (CST))
  - Summer (DST): UTC-5 (CDT)
- Area codes: 512 & 737
- GNIS feature ID: 1380011

Jones Prairie is an unincorporated community located in Milam County, Texas, United States. According to the Handbook of Texas, the community had a population of 35 in 2000.

== History ==
Jones Prairie was named for Joseph Patterson Jones. The population of Jones Prairie was 100 from the mid-1920s to the mid-1960s, but had gone down to 35 in 1990 and 2000.

== Geography ==
Jones Prairie is located on Farm to Market Road 979, 10 mi (16 km) northeast of Cameron in northern Milam County.

== Education ==
Jones Prairie had its own school in 1884. Today, the community is served by the Cameron Independent School District.

== Notable person ==
- James McKinney, who served on the 20th and 21st Texas Legislatures.
