= Hanover, Texas =

- Unincorporated community
- Location within Texas Location within the United States
- Coordinates: 30°48′14″N 96°49′18″W
- Country: United States
- State: Texas
- County: Milam
- Elevation: 423 ft (129 m)
- Time zone: UTC-6 (Central (CST))
  - Summer (DST): UTC-5 (CDT)
- Area codes: 512 & 737
- GNIS feature ID: 1379885

Hanover is an unincorporated community located in Milam County, Texas, United States. According to the Handbook of Texas, the community had a population of 27 in 2000.

== Geography ==
Hanover is located at the intersection of Farm to Market Roads 2095 and 3242, 10 mi (16 km) southeast of Cameron in eastern Milam County.

== Education ==
In 1903, Hanover was served by schools in Prairie Point. They each had two teachers for 69 White students and 89 Black students. In 1920, they joined the Liberty School District, then the Milano Independent School District in 1931.
