= Cross Roads, Milam County, Texas =

- Unincorporated community
- Location within Texas Location within the United States
- Coordinates: 30°57′52″N 96°47′29″W
- Country: United States
- State: Texas
- County: Milam
- Elevation: 420 ft (130 m)
- Time zone: UTC-6 (Central (CST))
  - Summer (DST): UTC-5 (CDT)
- Area codes: 512 & 737
- GNIS feature ID: 1379611

Cross Roads is an unincorporated community located in Milam County, Texas, United States. According to the Handbook of Texas, the community had a population of 35 in 2000.

== History ==
Not much is known about this community, but in 1941, it had one business serving 25 residents. Its population was 35 from 1990 through 2000.

== Geography ==
Cross Roads is located at the intersection of Farm to Market Roads 979 and 2027, 12 mi (19 km) northeast of Cameron in northeastern Milam County.

== Education ==
Cross Roads had its own school in 1941. Today, the community is served by the Cameron Independent School District.
