= Marak, Texas =

- Unincorporated community
- Location within Texas Location within the United States
- Coordinates: 30°54′07″N 97°04′07″W
- Country: United States
- State: Texas
- County: Milam
- Elevation: 381 ft (116 m)
- Time zone: UTC-6 (Central (CST))
  - Summer (DST): UTC-5 (CDT)
- Area code: 254
- GNIS feature ID: 1380139

Marak is an unincorporated community in Milam County, Texas, United States.

== History ==
It was founded in the early 1880s and named after František (Frank) Marak, a Moravian Czech immigrant who moved to the area from Fayette County. The Kubecka family gave land for a Catholic church in 1889, and S. S. Cyril and Methodius Catholic Church was dedicated in 1905. Marak is primarily a Czech community and is the center of a Catholic parish. The community consists mainly of farms scattered around the church and cemeteries. Like other rural areas in the state, this part of Milam County suffered a decline in population as the children of farmers moved to town. In the 1970s, however, the trend was reversed as townsfolk built homes in the countryside. In the early 1980s, the parish had 100 families. In 2000, no population data were available. A yearly homecoming was still celebrated at the church in 2009.

A Czech festival is held in Marak on the last Sunday in August.

== Geography ==
Marak is located on Farm to Market Road 2269, 6 mi (9.7 km) northwest of Cameron in northwestern Milam County.

== Education ==
A school was built on land donated by the Kubecka family in 1889. Today, the community is served by the Cameron Independent School District.
