= Thorndale High School =

Coordinates: 30°37′4″N 97°12′15″W

Location
- 300 N. Main St. Thorndale, Texas 76577-0870; United States

Information
- School type: Public high school
- School district: Thorndale Independent School District
- Principal: Lee Hafley
- Teaching staff: 19.85 (FTE)
- Grades: 9-12
- Enrollment: 222 (2025-2026)
- Student to teacher ratio: 10.28
- Colors: Maroon & Gold
- Athletics conference: UIL Class 2A
- Mascot: Bulldog
- Yearbook: The Bulldog
- Website: Thorndale High School

Thorndale High School is a public high school located in the city of Thorndale, Texas, USA and classified as a 2A school by the UIL. It is a part of the Thorndale Independent School District located in southwestern Milam County. In 2015, the school was rated "Met Standard" by the Texas Education Agency.

== Athletics ==
The Thorndale Bulldogs compete in these sports -

Volleyball, Cross Country, Football, Basketball, Golf, Tennis, Track, Baseball & Softball

=== State titles ===
- Baseball -
  - 1996(1A), 2005(1A)
- Boys Basketball -
  - 2007(1A/D1), 2008(1A/D1)
- Football
  - 1989(1A), 1994(1A), 1995(1A)
- Men's Track
  - 2003(1A) Gold Medalists 800M Relay
- Volleyball
  - 2018(2A) Bronze Medalists
- Softball
  - 2019(2A) Silver Medalists
- Cross Country
  - 2019(2A)appearance, 2017(2A)appearances
- Golf
  - 2019(2A)appearance

== Fine Arts ==
- One Act Play
  - 1990(1A)
- Marching Band
  - 2018 UIL 2A SMBC Bronze Medalists
  - 2020 UIL 2A SMBC Champions

== Notable alumni ==
- Lee Roy Caffey (Class of 1959) was an American football linebacker in the National Football League from 1963-1972 and played on 3 Super Bowl championship teams.
