= Nile, Texas =

Coordinates: 30.6339°N 97.0899°W

Nile is a ghost town in Milam County, Texas, United States, nine miles west of Rockdale; it is named after Egypt's Nile River. Its population peaked at 35 in 1896, when it had two cotton gins and a general store. The school, which had 43 students in 1903, consolidated with Thorndale in 1946. Today, nothing remains of Nile.
