= Liberty, Milam County, Texas =

- Unincorporated community
- Location within Texas Location within the United States
- Coordinates: 30°46′38″N 96°51′8″W
- Country: United States
- State: Texas
- County: Milam
- Elevation: 394 ft (120 m)
- Time zone: UTC-6 (Central (CST))
  - Summer (DST): UTC-5 (CDT)
- Area codes: 512 & 737
- GNIS feature ID: 1380080

Liberty is an unincorporated community located in Milam County, Texas, United States. According to the Handbook of Texas, the community had a population of 40 in 1990.

== History ==
Liberty had a Methodist church sometime before the Civil War. The 1941 county highway map showed the church and a few scattered houses in the community. Its population was 40 in 1990.

== Geography ==
Liberty is located on Farm to Market Road 3242, 5 mi (8.0 km) north of Milano in east-central Milam County.

== Education ==
In 1903, Liberty had a school with one teacher and 59 students. It joined the Milano Independent School District in 1931, even though a school was featured on the 1941 county highway map.
