= Corinth, Milam County, Texas =

Corinth, Texas
- Unincorporated community
- Location within Texas Location within the United States
- Coordinates: 30°50′35″N 97°08′07″W
- Country: United States
- State: Texas
- County: Milam
- Elevation: 449 ft (137 m)
- Time zone: UTC-6 (Central (CST))
  - Summer (DST): UTC-5 (CDT)
- Area code: 512
- GNIS feature ID: 2761957

Corinth is an unincorporated community in Milam County, Texas, United States.

== History ==
It was given the name Corinth after the biblical city of Corinth in Greece, which was colonized in 1847 by Germans and Czechs. Prior to the justice of the peace's office being relocated to Buckholts in 1892, Precinct Six's legal center was located in Corinth. The area was depicted on the 1941 county highway map as having a cemetery and a number of dispersed dwellings. On the county highway map from 1988, the town was only shown by a cemetery.

== Geography ==
Corinth is located on Farm to Market Road 1915, 10 miles (16 km) west of Cameron in western Milam County.

== Education ==
In 1903, Corinth had a school with two teachers and 97 students. It continued to operate in 1941. It joined the Buckholts Independent School District in 1950.
