= Sandow Power Plant =

Coal plant in Milam County, Texas

- Country: United States
- Location: Rockdale, Texas
- Coordinates: 30°33′51″N 97°3′50″W
- Status: Decommissioned
- Commission date: Units 1–3: 1954; Unit 4: 1981; Unit 5: 2009
- Decommission date: Units 1–3: 2009; Units 4–5: January, 2018
- Owner: Luminant

Thermal power station
- Primary fuel: Coal
- Cooling source: Alcoa Lake

Power generation
- Units operational: 2
- Nameplate capacity: 1,137 MW

Sandow Power Plant was a 1.1-gigawatt (1,137 MW) coal power plant located southwest of Rockdale in Milam County, Texas. It was operated by Luminant, a subsidiary of Vistra Corp. The plant closed in 2018.

== Sandow Power Plant Units 1–3 ==
Sandow was constructed by Alcoa in 1951 to power its nearby aluminium smelting facility. Operations of Sandow's first three units began in 1954 with a nearby man-made reservoir called Alcoa Lake utilized to cool the plant. In the 1980s, Alcoa commenced a mid-life update to Units 1–3 at a cost of $63 million. After its completion, pollution from the plant increased by 13,000 tons annually. A settlement with the Environmental Protection Agency (EPA) was agreed upon in 2003 to remedy the plant for violating the Clear Air Act. Ultimately, Units 1–3 would be decommissioned in 2009.

== Sandow Power Plant Units 4–5 ==
The plant had two active units at the time of its closure: Unit 4 began operation in 1981 and Unit 5 began operation in 2009. The power plant used lignite from the Sandow mine in Rockdale until 2006, when Three Oaks Mine in nearby Bastrop County, Texas opened. Unit 4 was retrofitted with a selective catalytic reduction (SCR) system by Fluor in 2008 to reduce nitrogen oxide (NO_{x}) emissions. Transmission of electricity to the nearby aluminum smelter stopped in 2008 when Alcoa ceased smelting operations at its Rockdale facility and accused Luminant of power supply issues. It was announced on October 13, 2017 that Luminant would shut down Sandow Power Plant in early-2018 due to economic factors such as low natural gas prices and growth in renewable energy. The Electric Reliability Council of Texas (ERCOT) approved of the shut down the following month. ERCOT found the plant was "not required to support ERCOT transmission system reliability," and closed by January 11, 2018.

== Demolition ==
Demolition of units four and five began in the spring of 2023 & is expected to be completed April 2024. The demolition is being carried out by Integrated Demolition and Remediation, the same company that demolished the Big Brown Power Plant in Fairfield Texas & Monticello Power Plant in Titus County, Texas.

On September 1, 2023 at 10 AM central daylight saving time, the bag houses on unit five powerplant, some concrete silos and the old smokestacks for units one, two and three were demolished by collapse by detonation.

At 11 AM on March 2, 2024, the new unit 3 smokestack and unit five A and B boilers were demolished by implosion.

== See also ==
- List of power stations in Texas
