= Ad Hall, Texas =

Ghost town in Texas, US

Ad Hall
- Ghost town
- Location within Texas
- Coordinates: 30.84741160°N 97.09387930°W
- Country: United States
- State: Texas
- County: Milam

Ad Hall is a ghost town in Milam County, Texas, United States. Situated on the junction of U.S. Route 190 and Farm to Market Road 486, a post office operated from 1874 to 1912. It became an electoral precinct in 1880. In 1881, the Gulf, Colorado and Santa Fe Railway built rail through the town. At its peak in the 1880s, it had a population of 200, which fell to 35 in the 1890s. It continued to decline, being abandoned by 2000.
