= Ben Arnold, Texas =

Coordinates: 30°57′50″N 96°59′17″W

- Census-designated place
- Interactive map of Ben Arnold, Texas
- Country: United States
- State: Texas
- County: Milam County
- Established: 1890
- Elevation: 522 ft (159 m)

Population (2020)
  - Total: 117
- FIPS code: 48-07516
- GNIS feature ID: 1351865

Ben Arnold is an unincorporated community and census-designated place in Milam County, Texas, United States. Ben Arnold (Benarnold) is on U.S. Highway 77, seven miles north of Cameron in northern Milam County.

Per the 2020 census, the population was 117.

== History ==
The community began as a stop on the San Antonio and Aransas Pass Railway in 1890 and was named for Bennie Arnold, B. I. Arnold's three-year-old daughter, who was mascot on the first train to pull into the new station. A local post office was opened in 1892, and by 1896 the community had three churches, a district school, and 125 residents.

In 1903, the school had two teachers and eighty students. By the 1920s, the population of Ben Arnold rose to 250; it remained fairly stable until the late 1960s, when it declined to 148. The Ben Arnold school system was consolidated with the Cameron Independent School District by the early 1970s. In 1977, the Southern Pacific abandoned the section of track connecting Ben Arnold with Cameron to the south and Rosebud to the north. The community had 148 residents and several businesses in 1990. The population remained the same in 2000.

== Demographics ==
Historical population
Census	Pop.	Note	%±
2020	117		—
U.S. Decennial Census; 1850–1900 1910; 1920 1930 1940; 1950 1960 1970; 1980 1990 2000; 2010 2020

Ben Arnold first appeared as a census designated place in the 2020 U.S. census.

=== 2020 census ===
Ben Arnold CDP, Texas – Racial and ethnic composition Note: the US Census treats Hispanic/Latino as an ethnic category. This table excludes Latinos from the racial categories and assigns them to a separate category. Hispanics/Latinos may be of any race.
Race / Ethnicity (NH = Non-Hispanic)	Pop 2020	% 2020
White alone (NH)	62	52.99%
Black or African American alone (NH)	10	8.55%
Native American or Alaska Native alone (NH)	1	0.85%
Asian alone (NH)	0	0.85%
Native Hawaiian or Pacific Islander alone (NH)	0	0.00%
Other race alone (NH)	0	0.00%
Mixed race or Multiracial (NH)	1	0.85%
Hispanic or Latino (any race)	42	35.90%
Total	117	100.00%

== Education ==
It is in the Cameron Independent School District.

== Notable people ==
- Dede Westbrook, footballer
