= Bowers, Milam County, Texas =

Ghost town in Texas, US

Bowers
- Ghost town
- Location in Texas
- Coordinates: 30.91185300°N 97.18610580°W
- Country: United States
- State: Texas
- County: Milam

Bowers is a ghost town in Milam County, Texas, United States. It was established by 1941 as a switch on the Gulf, Colorado and Santa Fe Railway.
