= Nashville, Texas =

Ghost town in Texas, United States

Coordinates: 30°49′33″N 96°39′10″W

Nashville (also known as Nashville-on-the-Brazos) was a community, now a ghost town, on the southeastern bank of the Brazos River in present-day Milam County, Texas, United States.

The town was surveyed in the fall of 1835, with Sterling C. Robertson as its founder. It was named in honor of Nashville, Tennessee, Robertson's birthplace. The town served as the headquarters for Robertson's Colony. In January 1836, the settlement was attacked by Indians in the area. Two people were killed, which led to the formation of Robertson's Ranger Company. The rangers constructed Fort Milam at the falls of the Brazos and a second at the three forks of the Little River. Nashville was also designated the seat of justice for Milam municipality in 1836.

Following the Texas Revolution, Nashville was considered by the Texas Congress as a possible site for the capital of the Republic of Texas. From 1837 to 1846, the town served as the Milam County seat. It began to slowly decline after 1846, when the state legislature moved the county seat to Cameron. In 1868, the arrival of the Houston and Texas Central Railroad at nearby Hearne provided the remaining residents with the incentive to move. The town's post office closed that same year.

A chapter of the Daughters of the American Revolution, with additional funds from Milam County, bought seven acres of the former Nashville site and deeded it to the state of Texas in 1927. Nashville was remembered during the Texas Centennial with the addition of several historic markers along U.S. Highway 79, approximately five miles northeast of Gause and five miles west of Hearne.
