= Manse Jolly =

American soldier (died 1869)

Manson Sherrill (Manse) Jolly (died 1869) was the fifth of seven sons of Joseph Moorhead Jolly and Anna Cole Sherrill. He had six brothers and four sisters, one of whom died in infancy. Jolly was known for his brutal revenge against the Union soldiers stationed in Anderson, South Carolina after the close of the Civil War.

Jolly's furlough papers describe him at 20 years of age as "six feet four inches high, ruddy complexion, blue eyes, red hair, and by profession a farmer, born in Anderson district in the state of S.C."

Five of Jolly's brothers were killed during the war, and the sixth committed suicide, possibly from the effects of the war. One third of the men of fighting age in South Carolina were killed. Upon returning home to find his town taken over by the men he had been fighting, Jolly swore an oath to kill five "Yankee" soldiers for every brother he lost during the war. Jolly more than made good on his oath, purportedly killing as many as 100 Union soldiers during the war. He reportedly hid out in the forests surrounding Anderson, and preyed upon the Union soldiers stationed nearby. Jolly used guerrilla warfare tactics, with which he would have been familiar from his experience as a scout during the American Civil War. When staying in Anderson became too dangerous for him, Jolly fled to Cameron, Texas, to his Sherrill relatives in 1867, where he died by drowning two years later while attempting to cross a swollen stream.

A play titled "The Reconstruction of Manse Jolly" speaks to the struggles that military veterans had with PTSD, focusing on Jolly's story in the middle of the destruction in the American south.
