= Briary, Texas =

Ghost town in Milam County, Texas

Coordinates: 31°02′41″N 96°53′31″W

Briary is a ghost town in Milam County, Texas, United States, near Rosebud. It was named for Big Briary Creek, which was nearby. The town had several businesses, churches, and a schoolhouse (which can be still seen today) in the 1940s, but was dropped from maps by the next decade.
