= Burlington, Texas =

Coordinates: 31°1′N 97°0′W

- Census-designated place
- Location within Texas Location within the United States
- Country: United States
- State: Texas
- County: Milam
- Elevation: 430 ft (130 m)

Population (2020)
  - Total: 81
- Time zone: UTC-6 (Central (CST))
  - Summer (DST): UTC-5 (CDT)
- GNIS feature ID: 1353333

Burlington is an unincorporated community and census-designated place in Milam County, Texas, United States. It was first listed as a CDP in the 2020 census, with a population of 81. Burlington has a post office, with the postal ("ZIP") code 76519.

== History ==
The earliest settlers in the area included John and Michael Jones. The pair built cabins in the area circa 1867, and the community was initially named Irish Settlement. A Catholic church was constructed in the 1880s. When the post office was established in 1884, the town was renamed Waterford. The post office operated in the home of Timothy Gleason, a native of Tipperary, Ireland, who changed the town's name to Burlington, after Burlington, Vermont.

== Demographics ==
Historical population
| Census | Pop. | Note | %± |
|---|---|---|---|
| 2020 | 81 | | — |
U.S. Decennial Census; 1850–1900 1910; 1920 1930 1940; 1950 1960 1970; 1980 1990 2000; 2010 2020

Burlington first appeared as a census designated place in the 2020 U.S. census.

=== 2020 census ===
Burlington CDP, Texas – Racial and ethnic composition Note: the US Census treats Hispanic/Latino as an ethnic category. This table excludes Latinos from the racial categories and assigns them to a separate category. Hispanics/Latinos may be of any race.
| Race / Ethnicity (NH = Non-Hispanic) | Pop 2020 | % 2020 |
|---|---|---|
| White alone (NH) | 44 | 54.32% |
| Black or African American alone (NH) | 1 | 1.23% |
| Native American or Alaska Native alone (NH) | 1 | 1.23% |
| Asian alone (NH) | 0 | 0.00% |
| Native Hawaiian or Pacific Islander alone (NH) | 0 | 0.00% |
| Other race alone (NH) | 0 | 0.00% |
| Mixed race or Multiracial (NH) | 1 | 1.23% |
| Hispanic or Latino (any race) | 34 | 41.98% |
| Total | 81 | 100.00% |

== Climate ==
The climate in this area is characterized by hot, humid summers and generally mild to cool winters. According to the Köppen Climate Classification system, Burlington has a humid subtropical climate, abbreviated "Cfa" on climate maps.

== Education ==
Most of the CDP is in the Rosebud-Lott Independent School District. A part is in the Cameron Independent School District.
