= Duncan, Texas =

Ghost town in Texas, United States

Duncan is a ghost town in Milam County, Texas, United States, twelve miles (19 km) northwest of Rockdale near Alligator Creek. The area was settled in 1879, and George and Elizabeth Duncan donated land to build a two-teacher school in 1892. The school was consolidated with Sharp ISD by the 1930s, and the only landmark there today is a small community center.
