= Milam County, Texas =

County in Texas, United States

- County
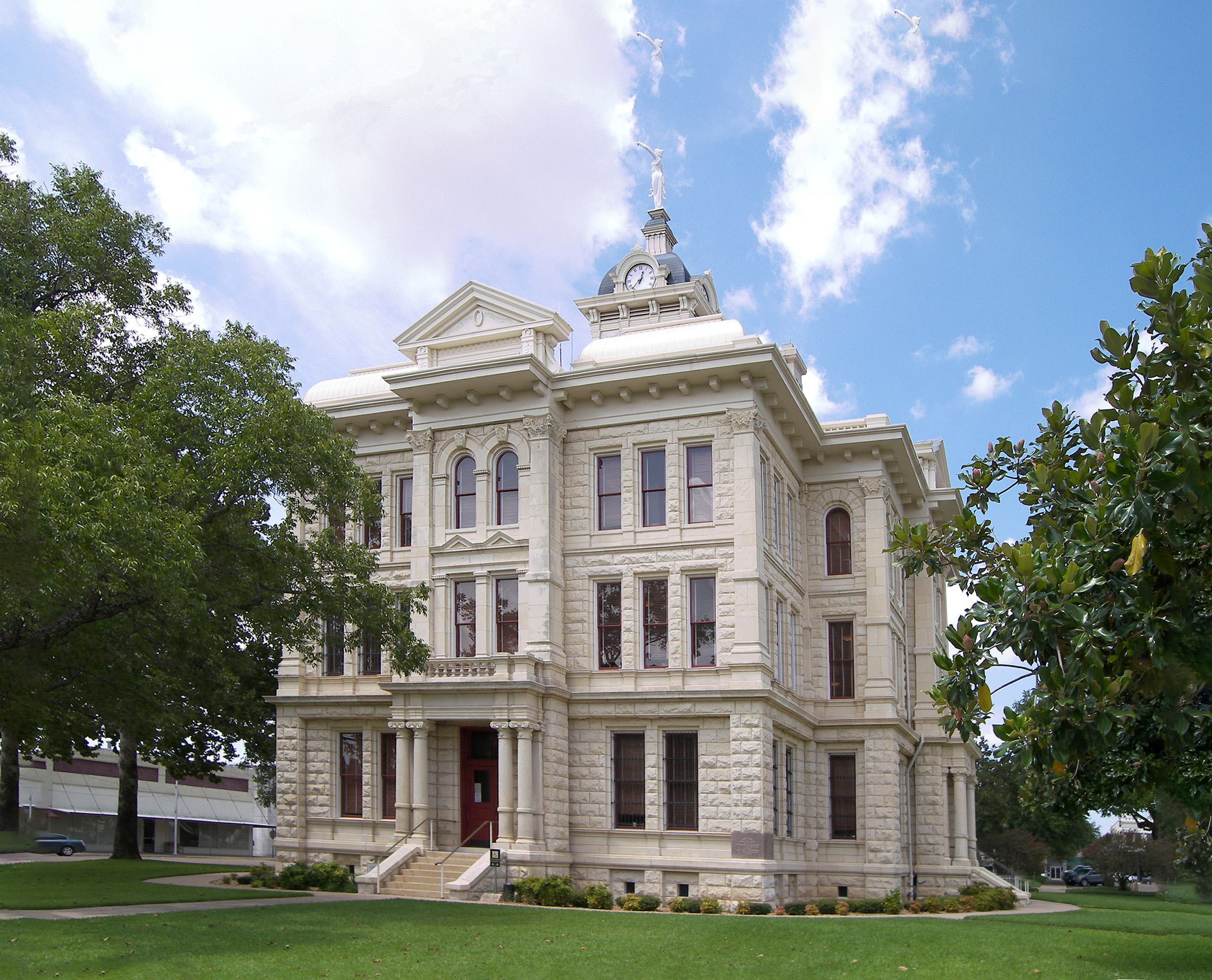
- The Milam County Courthouse in Cameron. The Courthouse was added to the National Register of Historic Places on December 20, 1977.

- Location within the U.S. state of Texas
- Coordinates: 30°47′N 96°59′W
- Country: United States
- State: Texas
- Founded: 1837
- Named for: Benjamin Rush Milam
- Seat: Cameron
- Largest city: Rockdale

Area
  - Total: 1,022 sq mi (2,650 km^{2})
  - Land: 1,017 sq mi (2,630 km^{2})
  - Water: 4.8 sq mi (12 km^{2}) 0.5%

Population (2020)
  - Total: 24,754
  - Estimate (2025): 26,258 ▲
  - Density: 24.34/sq mi (9.398/km^{2})
- Time zone: UTC−6 (Central)
  - Summer (DST): UTC−5 (CDT)
- Congressional district: 17th
- Website: www.milamcounty.net

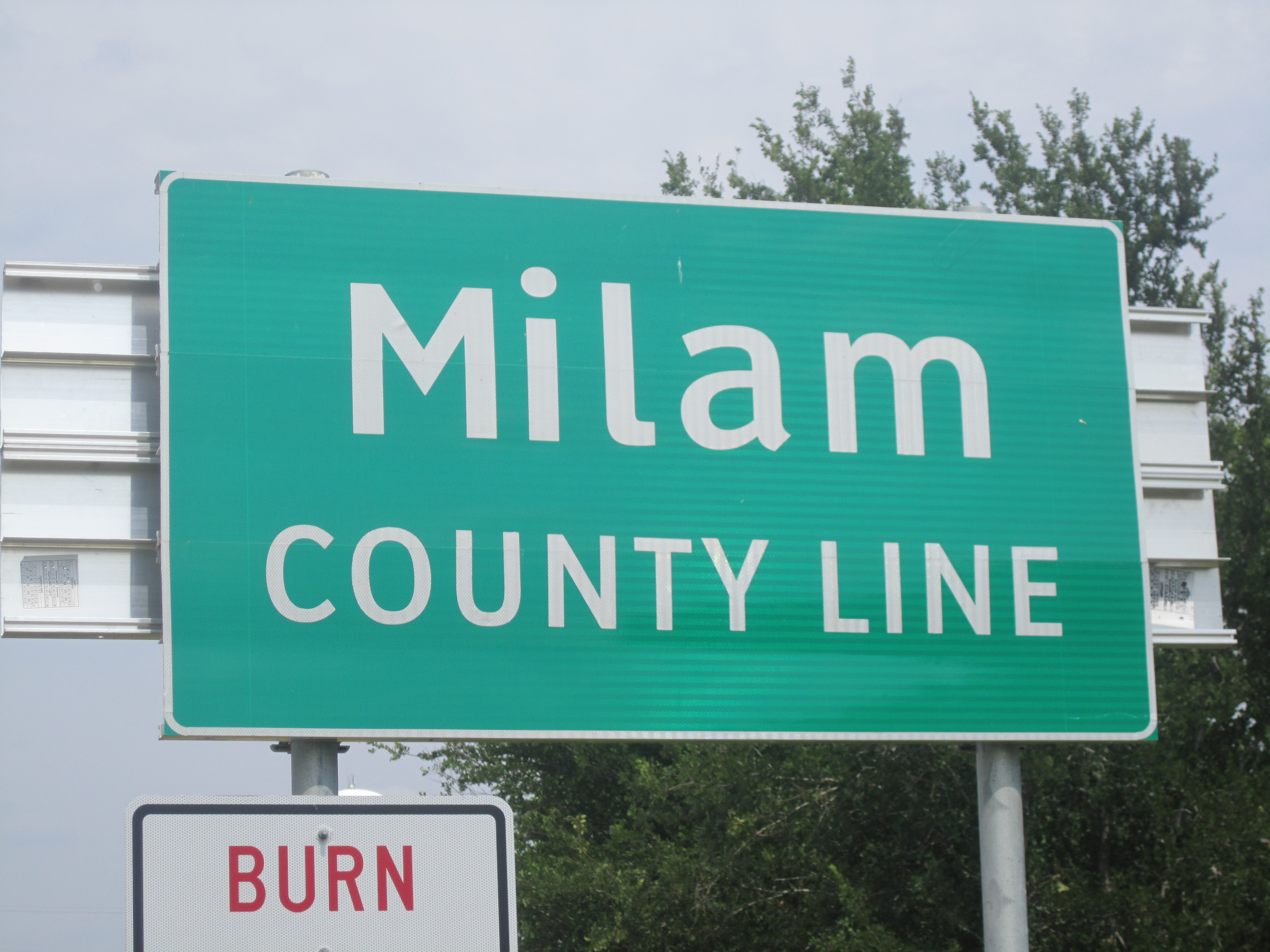

Milam County is a county located in the U.S. state of Texas. As of the 2020 census, its population was 24,754. The county seat is Cameron. The county was created in 1834 as a municipality in Mexico and organized as a county in 1837. Milam County is named for Benjamin Rush Milam, an early settler and a soldier in the Texas Revolution.

== Geography ==
According to the U.S. Census Bureau, the county has a total area of 1,022 square miles (2,650 km^{2}), of which 1,017 sq mi (2,630 km^{2}) are land and 4.8 sq mi (12 km^{2}) (0.5%) are covered by water.

=== Major highways ===
- U.S. Highway 77
- U.S. Highway 79
- U.S. Highway 190
- State Highway 36

=== Adjacent counties ===
- Falls County (north)
- Robertson County (northeast)
- Burleson County (southeast)
- Lee County (south)
- Williamson County (southwest)
- Bell County (northwest)

== Demographics ==
Historical population
Census	Pop.	Note	%±
1850	2,907		—
1860	5,175		78.0%
1870	8,984		73.6%
1880	18,659		107.7%
1890	24,773		32.8%
1900	39,666		60.1%
1910	36,780		−7.3%
1920	38,104		3.6%
1930	37,915		−0.5%
1940	33,120		−12.6%
1950	23,585		−28.8%
1960	22,263		−5.6%
1970	20,028		−10.0%
1980	22,732		13.5%
1990	22,946		0.9%
2000	24,238		5.6%
2010	24,757		2.1%
2020	24,754		0.0%
2025 (est.)	26,258	▲	6.1%
U.S. Decennial Census; 1850–2010 2010 2020

=== Racial and ethnic composition ===
Milam County, Texas – Racial and ethnic composition Note: the US Census treats Hispanic/Latino as an ethnic category. This table excludes Latinos from the racial categories and assigns them to a separate category. Hispanics/Latinos may be of any race.
Race / Ethnicity (NH = Non-Hispanic)	Pop 1980	Pop 1990	Pop 2000	Pop 2010	Pop 2020	% 1980	% 1990	% 2000	% 2010	% 2020
White alone (NH)	17,210	16,528	16,763	16,216	15,367	75.71%	72.03%	69.16%	65.50%	62.08%
Black or African American alone (NH)	3,047	2,884	2,627	2,380	2,097	13.40%	12.57%	10.84%	9.61%	8.47%
Native American or Alaska Native alone (NH)	28	46	85	76	67	0.12%	0.20%	0.35%	0.31%	0.27%
Asian alone (NH)	25	23	49	95	111	0.11%	0.10%	0.20%	0.38%	0.45%
Native Hawaiian or Pacific Islander alone (NH)	x	x	2	0	11	x	x	0.01%	0.00%	0.04%
Other race alone (NH)	32	9	22	10	84	0.14%	0.04%	0.09%	0.04%	0.34%
Mixed race or Multiracial (NH)	x	x	174	200	753	x	x	0.72%	0.81%	3.04%
Hispanic or Latino (any race)	2,390	3,456	4,516	5,780	6,264	10.51%	15.06%	18.63%	23.35%	25.31%
Total	22,732	22,946	24,238	24,757	24,754	100.00%	100.00%	100.00%	100.00%	100.00%

=== 2020 census ===
As of the 2020 census, the county had a population of 24,754, a median age of 44.1 years, 23.0% of residents under the age of 18, and 22.2% of residents 65 years of age or older. For every 100 females there were 98.7 males, and for every 100 females age 18 and over there were 96.2 males age 18 and over.

The racial makeup of the county was 69.7% White, 8.8% Black or African American, 0.6% American Indian and Alaska Native, 0.5% Asian, 0.1% Native Hawaiian and Pacific Islander, 9.8% from some other race, and 10.5% from two or more races. Hispanic or Latino residents of any race comprised 25.3% of the population.

42.9% of residents lived in urban areas, while 57.1% lived in rural areas.

There were 9,711 households in the county, of which 29.0% had children under the age of 18 living in them. Of all households, 49.6% were married-couple households, 19.0% were households with a male householder and no spouse or partner present, and 26.3% were households with a female householder and no spouse or partner present. About 27.8% of all households were made up of individuals and 14.7% had someone living alone who was 65 years of age or older.

There were 11,541 housing units, of which 15.9% were vacant. Among occupied housing units, 72.8% were owner-occupied and 27.2% were renter-occupied. The homeowner vacancy rate was 1.7% and the rental vacancy rate was 11.8%.

=== 2000 census ===
As of the 2000 census, 24,238 people, 9,199 households, and 6,595 families were residing in the county. The population density was 24/sq mi (9.3/km^{2}). The 10,866 housing units averaged 11/sq mi (4.2/km^{2}). The racial makeup of the county was 78.89% White, 11.05% African American, 0.50% Native American, 0.22% Asian, 7.71% from other races, and 1.63% from two or more races. About 18.63% of the population were Hispanics or Latinos of any race. By ancestry, 16.7% were of American, 16.1% German, 7.2% English, and 6.8% Irish according to Census 2000.

Of the 9,199 households, 32.40% had children under 18 living with them, 56.50% were married couples living together, 11.30% had a female householder with no husband present, and 28.30% were not families. About 25.90% were single-person households, and 14.10% had someone living alone who was 65 or older. The average household size was 2.59 and the average family size was 3.11.

In the county, the age distribution was 27.5% under 18, 7.7% from 18 to 24, 24.7% from 25 to 44, 22.9% from 45 to 64, and 17.2% who were 65 or older. The median age was 38 years. For every 100 females, there were 96.1 males. For every 100 females age 18 and over, there were 90.6 males.

The median income for a household in the county was $33,186, and for a family was $40,431. Males had a median income of $30,149 versus $20,594 for females. The per capita income for the county was $16,920. About 12.20% of families and 15.90% of the population were below the poverty line, including 21.80% of those under age 18 and 15.30% of those age 65 or over.

== Education ==
Six independent school districts are present in Milam County:

- Buckholts Independent School District
- Cameron Independent School District
- Gause Independent School District
- Milano Independent School District
- Rockdale Independent School District
- Thorndale Independent School District

Five additional districts extend into parts of Milam County, but are based in neighboring counties: Bartlett, Caldwell, Holland, Lexington, and Rosebud-Lott.

St. Paul Lutheran School St. Paul Lutheran Church and School, Thorndale in Thorndale, a private institution, serves students from prekindergarten through grade 8.

Temple Junior College District is the designated community college for county residents in Bartlett, Buckholts, Cameron, Rockdale, Rosebud-Lott, and Thorndale ISDs. Legislation also states that the district covers Holland ISD "located in Bell County". Blinn College is the designated community college for county residents in Gause, Lexington, and Milano ISDs. Legislation does not state whether a community college or which community college covers residents of Caldwell ISD.

== Communities ==
=== Cities ===
- Cameron (county seat)
- Milano
- Rockdale
- Thorndale (small part in Williamson County)

=== Town ===
- Buckholts

=== Census-designated places ===
- Ben Arnold
- Burlington
- Gause
- Praesel

=== Unincorporated communities ===
- Baileyville
- Belmena
- Branchville
- Clarkson
- Corinth
- Cross Roads
- Davilla
- Detmold
- Elevation
- Elm Ridge
- Forest Grove
- Hanover
- Hoyte
- Jones Prairie
- Liberty
- Liberty Hill
- Marak
- Marlow
- Maysfield
- Minerva
- Pettibone
- San Gabriel
- Sharp
- Silver City
- Val Verde
- Yarrellton

=== Ghost towns ===
- Briary
- Bowers
- Bryant Station
- Bushdale
- Duncan
- Nashville
- Nile
- Sipe Springs

== Politics ==
United States presidential election results for Milam County, Texas
Year	Republican		Democratic		Third party(ies)	
Year	No.	%	No.	%	No.	%
1912	244	8.75%	1,939	69.57%	604	21.67%
1916	576	19.15%	2,198	73.07%	234	7.78%
1920	371	7.68%	2,598	53.81%	1,859	38.50%
1924	930	14.68%	5,087	80.31%	317	5.00%
1928	1,270	30.86%	2,842	69.05%	4	0.10%
1932	264	5.32%	4,676	94.22%	23	0.46%
1936	288	6.57%	4,077	93.02%	18	0.41%
1940	1,110	21.31%	4,083	78.38%	16	0.31%
1944	623	12.53%	3,537	71.11%	814	16.37%
1948	646	15.05%	3,261	75.98%	385	8.97%
1952	2,539	43.94%	3,227	55.85%	12	0.21%
1956	2,486	45.48%	2,969	54.32%	11	0.20%
1960	1,898	34.16%	3,640	65.51%	18	0.32%
1964	1,334	23.37%	4,368	76.51%	7	0.12%
1968	1,614	25.18%	3,269	51.01%	1,526	23.81%
1972	3,554	62.14%	2,159	37.75%	6	0.10%
1976	2,404	32.86%	4,871	66.59%	40	0.55%
1980	3,251	42.62%	4,230	55.46%	146	1.91%
1984	4,384	53.86%	3,734	45.87%	22	0.27%
1988	3,512	41.83%	4,865	57.94%	19	0.23%
1992	2,414	32.32%	3,542	47.43%	1,512	20.25%
1996	3,019	39.90%	3,869	51.13%	679	8.97%
2000	4,706	56.91%	3,429	41.47%	134	1.62%
2004	5,291	60.24%	3,445	39.22%	47	0.54%
2008	5,217	62.43%	3,044	36.42%	96	1.15%
2012	5,481	66.60%	2,636	32.03%	113	1.37%
2016	6,364	73.45%	2,051	23.67%	249	2.87%
2020	7,984	75.48%	2,496	23.60%	98	0.93%
2024	8,691	78.31%	2,331	21.00%	76	0.68%

United States Senate election results for Milam County, Texas1
Year	Republican		Democratic		Third party(ies)	
Year	No.	%	No.	%	No.	%
2024	8,347	75.63%	2,462	22.31%	227	2.06%

United States Senate election results for Milam County, Texas2
Year	Republican		Democratic		Third party(ies)	
Year	No.	%	No.	%	No.	%
2020	7,759	75.10%	2,382	23.06%	190	1.84%

Texas Gubernatorial election results for Milam County
Year	Republican		Democratic		Third party(ies)	
Year	No.	%	No.	%	No.	%
2022	6,717	80.37%	1,559	18.65%	82	0.98%

== See also ==
- National Register of Historic Places listings in Milam County, Texas
- Recorded Texas Historic Landmarks in Milam County
