= Silver City, Milam County, Texas =

Silver City, Navarro County, Texas
- Unincorporated community
- Location within Texas Location within the United States
- Coordinates: 30°54′36″N 96°57′1″W
- Country: United States
- State: Texas
- County: Navarro
- Elevation: 341 ft (104 m)
- Time zone: UTC-6 (Central (CST))
  - Summer (DST): UTC-5 (CDT)
- Postal code: 76679
- Area code: Area code 903
- GNIS feature ID: 1380540

Silver City is an unincorporated community located in Navarro County, Texas, United States. According to the Handbook of Texas, the community had a population of 25 in 2000.

== History ==
At one time in Silver City's history, Tom Hamilton's store's porch housed the lone telephone in the community. A caller who wanted to pay for it put fifteen cents in a box next to the phone.

From 1988 to 2000, Silver City had a population of 25.
