= Thorndale, Texas =

- City
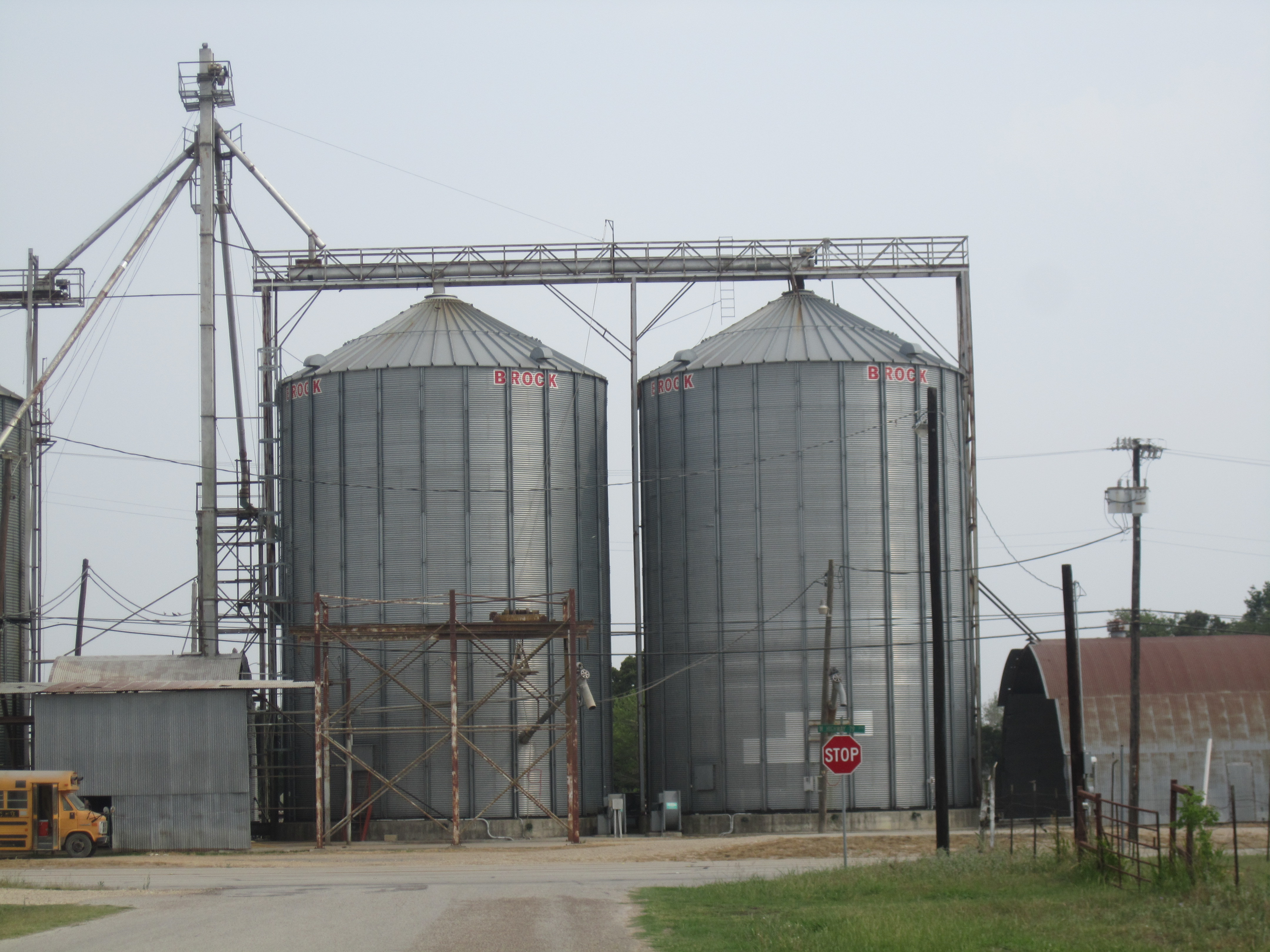
- Silos in Thorndale

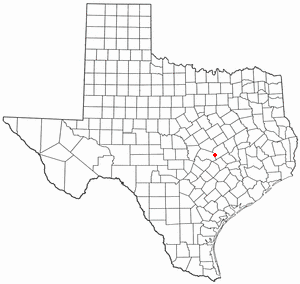
- Location of Thorndale, Texas

- Coordinates: 30°36′45″N 97°12′16″W
- Country: United States
- State: Texas
- Counties: Milam, Williamson

Area
  - Total: 0.97 sq mi (2.50 km^{2})
  - Land: 0.96 sq mi (2.49 km^{2})
  - Water: 0.0039 sq mi (0.01 km^{2})
- Elevation: 453 ft (138 m)

Population (2020)
  - Total: 1,263
  - Density: 1,352.9/sq mi (522.35/km^{2})
- Time zone: UTC-6 (Central (CST))
  - Summer (DST): UTC-5 (CDT)
- ZIP code: 76577
- Area codes: 512, 737
- FIPS code: 48-72776
- GNIS feature ID: 1369864
- Website: www.cityofthorndaletx.org

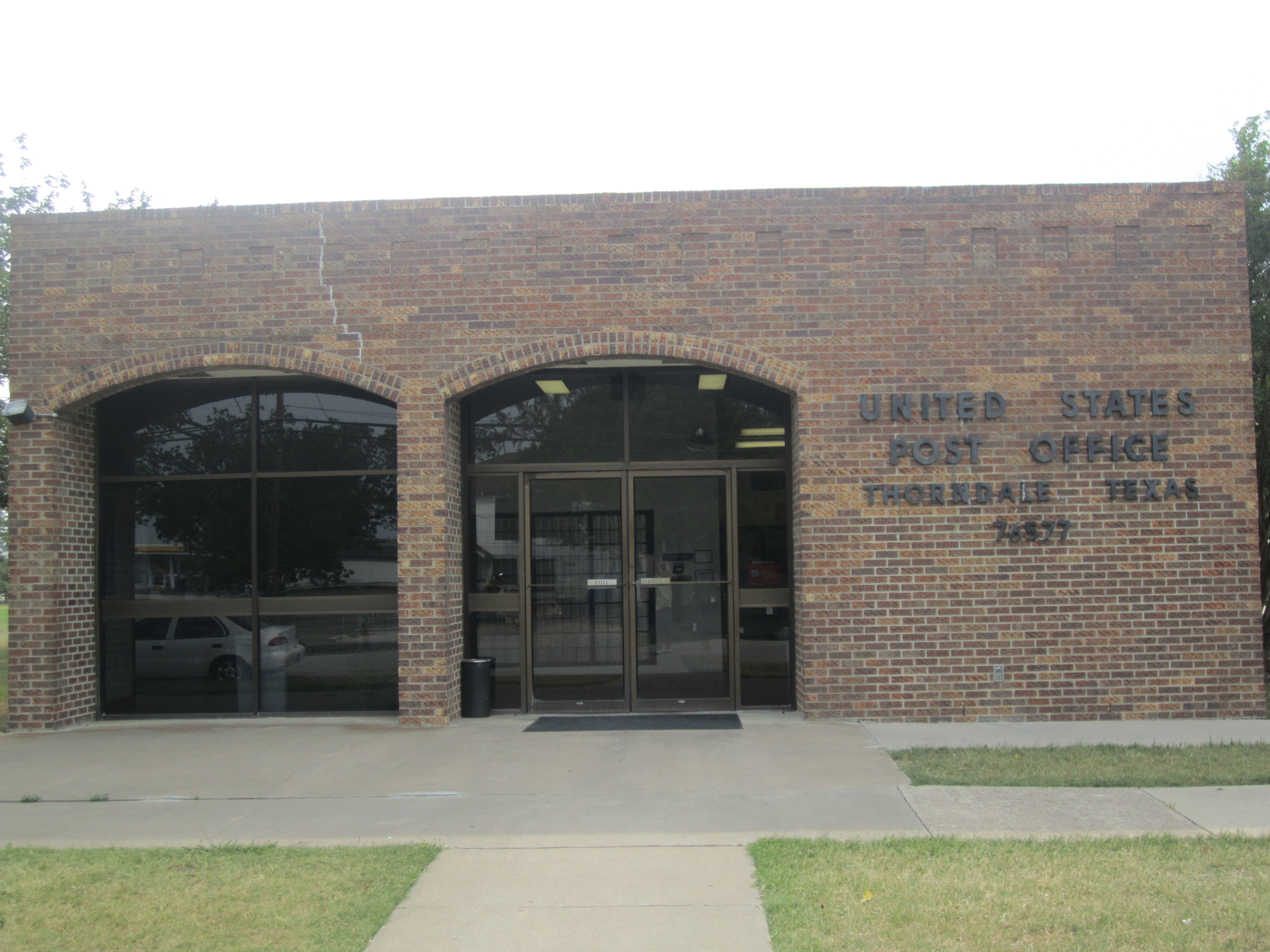
U.S. Post Office in Thorndale

Thorndale is a city in Milam County, Texas, United States, with a small section in Williamson County. The population was 1,263 at the 2020 census. It was founded in 1878, approximately three miles west of its present site, and moved to its current site in 1880.

== History ==
Antonio Gómez, a Mexican-American teenager, was lynched on June 19, 1911, in Thorndale following his lethal stabbing of a German-American garage owner, Charles Zieschang. Concerns about prejudice and violence against Mexican-American youths, such as the Gómez hanging, inspired Jovita Idar to found the League of Mexican Women (La Liga Femenil Mexicanista).

== Geography ==
Thorndale is located at 30°36′45″N 97°12′16″W (30.612549, –97.204523), about 40 miles northeast of Austin and 12 miles west of Rockdale. Most of the city lies in Milam County, with only a small portion in Williamson County.

According to the United States Census Bureau, the city has a total area of 1.0 square miles (2.5 km^{2}), all land.

=== Climate ===
The climate in this area is characterized by hot, humid summers and generally mild to cool winters. According to the Köppen Climate Classification system, Thorndale has a humid subtropical climate, abbreviated "Cfa" on climate maps.

== Demographics ==
Historical population
Census	Pop.	Note	%±
1930	1,002		—
1940	898		−10.4%
1950	855		−4.8%
1960	995		16.4%
1970	1,031		3.6%
1980	1,300		26.1%
1990	1,092		−16.0%
2000	1,278		17.0%
2010	1,336		4.5%
2020	1,263		−5.5%
U.S. Decennial Census

=== 2020 census ===
As of the 2020 census, Thorndale had a population of 1,263. The median age was 41.1 years. 23.0% of residents were under the age of 18 and 18.8% of residents were 65 years of age or older. For every 100 females there were 91.1 males, and for every 100 females age 18 and over there were 88.7 males age 18 and over.

0.0% of residents lived in urban areas, while 100.0% lived in rural areas.

There were 489 households in Thorndale, of which 34.8% had children under the age of 18 living in them. Of all households, 48.1% were married-couple households, 15.5% were households with a male householder and no spouse or partner present, and 31.3% were households with a female householder and no spouse or partner present. About 27.6% of all households were made up of individuals and 14.7% had someone living alone who was 65 years of age or older.

There were 567 housing units, of which 13.8% were vacant. The homeowner vacancy rate was 1.4% and the rental vacancy rate was 7.8%.

Racial composition as of the 2020 census
Race	Number	Percent
White	925	73.2%
Black or African American	57	4.5%
American Indian and Alaska Native	10	0.8%
Asian	7	0.6%
Native Hawaiian and Other Pacific Islander	0	0.0%
Some other race	124	9.8%
Two or more races	140	11.1%
Hispanic or Latino (of any race)	297	23.5%

=== 2000 census ===
As of the 2000 census, there were 1,278 people, 485 households, and 354 families residing in the city. The population density was 1,307.2 inhabitants per square mile (504.7/km^{2}). There were 542 housing units at an average density of 554.4 per square mile (214.1/km^{2}). The racial makeup of the city was 83.26% White, 6.81% African American, 0.78% Native American, 0.16% Asian, 6.18% from other races, and 2.82% from two or more races. Hispanic or Latino of any race were 17.14% of the population.

There were 485 households, out of which 36.1% had children under the age of 18 living with them, 54.6% were married couples living together, 12.6% had a female householder with no husband present, and 27.0% were non-families. 24.5% of all households were made up of individuals, and 13.8% had someone living alone who was 65 years of age or older. The average household size was 2.64 and the average family size was 3.10.

In the city, the population was spread out, with 29.7% under the age of 18, 7.8% from 18 to 24, 27.2% from 25 to 44, 20.7% from 45 to 64, and 14.5% who were 65 years of age or older. The median age was 35 years. For every 100 females, there were 97.8 males. For every 100 females age 18 and over, there were 85.9 males.

The median income for a household in the city was $33,684, and the median income for a family was $40,625. Males had a median income of $33,125 versus $21,786 for females. The per capita income for the city was $18,722. About 4.5% of families and 9.3% of the population were below the poverty line, including 8.9% of those under age 18 and 21.0% of those age 65 or over.

== Education ==
The City of Thorndale is served by the Thorndale Independent School District.

== Religion ==
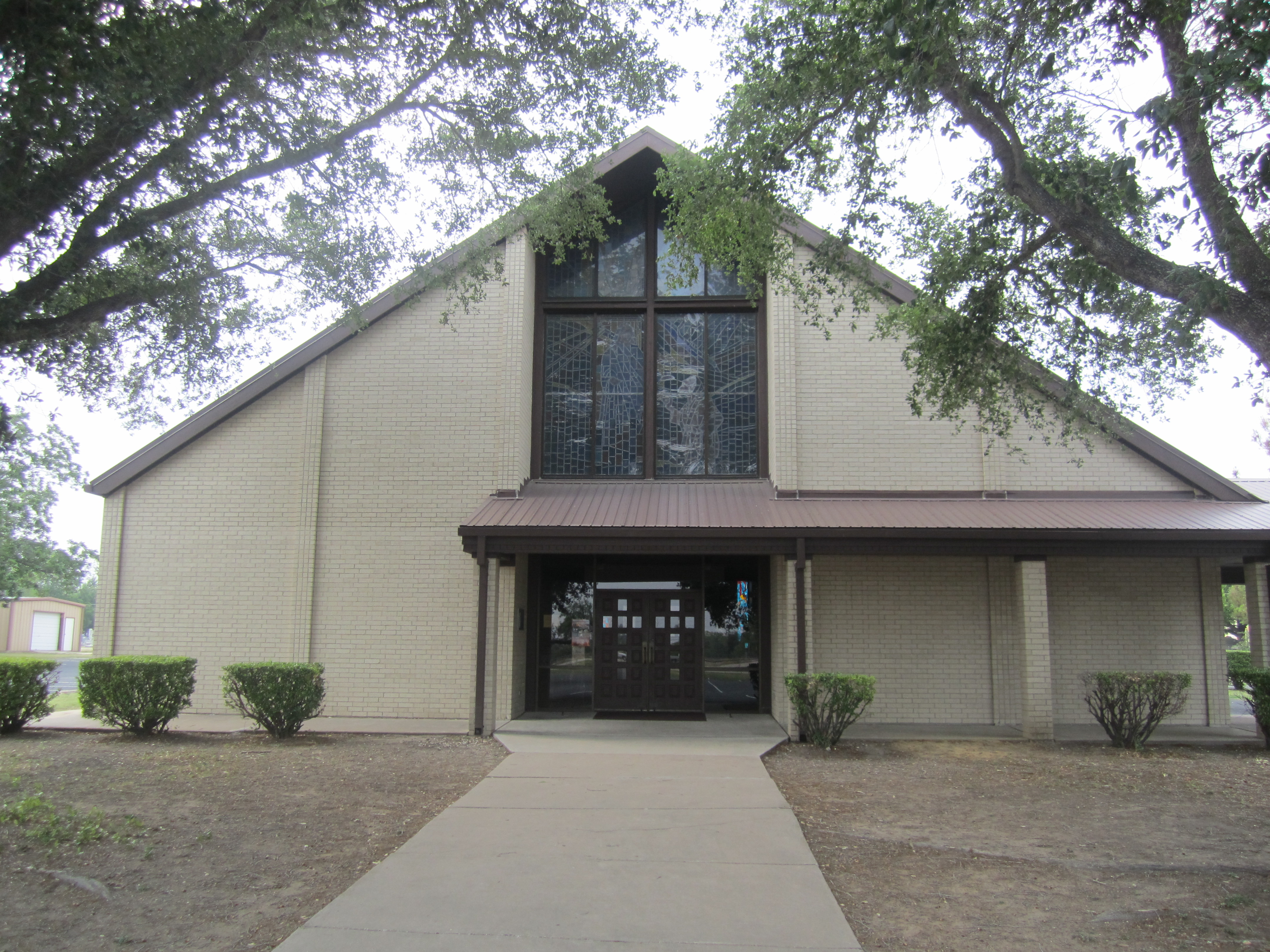
St. Paul Lutheran Church in Thorndale, established in 1891, has a school and a cemetery to the rear of the sanctuary. Its services were originally in German.

Thorndale has a number of churches, representing several denominations. Pleasant Retreat United Methodist Church (Texas Annual Conference), St. Paul Lutheran Church (Missouri Synod), St. John Lutheran Church (ELCA), First Baptist Church of Thorndale (FBC), Shiloh Baptist Church (SBC) and Mount Zion Baptist Church (National Baptist) are the main congregations serving Thorndale.

== "The Rookie" ==
Thorndale (along with Thrall, Taylor, and Round Rock to the west) was where the vast majority of the principal photography and locations for the 2002 movie The Rookie, starring Dennis Quaid, and Rachel Griffiths, were filmed. The Thorndale High School baseball stadium, the downtown main street, and other parts of town were integral to the film, with Thorndale cast as "Big Lake, Texas". Local resident Emanuel “Shifty” Castillo's role in the film was to throw the baseball when Dennis Quaid was on the mound. Other local residents also appeared in the film as extras. Thorndale has also served as location for a number of other films and other productions.

== The Apache Pass Amphitheater ==
The Apache Pass Amphitheater and Festival Grounds is located about 7 miles north of Thorndale on FM 908, just off FM 486. Apache Pass hosts a number of major events each year., including Christian music festivals and the eastern edition of the Nocturnal Wonderland (formerly known as the Nocturnal Fest), one of the largest electronic music festivals in the United States which found 50,000 musical enthusiasts attending in 2012. Apache Pass also hosts the Annual Texas Trail Riders Convention and Trail Ride and the Annual Silver Spurs Spring Jam, which benefits the SS BEVO Endowment, which has been established to fund the care and expenses of BEVO (the UT Longhorn steer mascot), provides scholarships for UT students and supports the University of Texas Neighborhood Longhorns program. Apache Pass also hosts a number of local events and concerts, and has become a vital part of the Thorndale community and its tradition of the arts, music and film. Apache Pass also has a historical museum dedicated to the Apache nation and the contribution of Native Americans in the history of Texas.

== Notable people ==
- Lee Roy Caffey, Former All-Pro NFL linebacker who played on the legendary Green Bay Packers teams of the 1960s, was born in nearby Rockdale but attended and played football at Thorndale High School
- Sam Smith, World War II combat photographer, painter, and multimedia artist, was born in Thorndale in 1918
