= Milano, Texas =

- Town
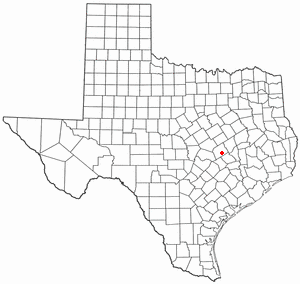
- Location of Milano, Texas

- Coordinates: 30°42′33″N 96°51′48″W
- Country: United States
- State: Texas
- County: Milam

Area
  - Total: 1.83 sq mi (4.74 km^{2})
  - Land: 1.83 sq mi (4.73 km^{2})
  - Water: 0.0039 sq mi (0.01 km^{2})
- Elevation: 522 ft (159 m)

Population (2020)
  - Total: 390
  - Density: 230.4/sq mi (88.96/km^{2})
- Time zone: UTC-6 (CST)
  - Summer (DST): UTC-5 (CDT)
- ZIP code: 76556
- Area codes: 512, 737
- FIPS code: 48-48336
- GNIS feature ID: 1362829
- Website: www.cityofmilano.org

Milano is a city in Milam County, Texas, United States, located at the intersection of U.S. Route 79 and State Highway 36, 12 miles southeast of Cameron, the county seat. Its population was 390 at the 2020 census.

On November 5, 1960, country music singer Johnny Horton was killed by a drunk driver on Highway 79 near Milano on his way home from a performance at the Skyline Club in Austin.

== Geography ==
Milano is located at 30°42′33″N 96°51′48″W (30.709190, –96.863420).

According to the United States Census Bureau, the city has a total area of 1.83 square miles (4.7 km^{2}), of which 0.15% is covered by water.

== History ==
The International-Great Northern Railroad Company laid out the original site of Milano in 1874, about 1-1/2 mi west of the city's present site. A United States post office opened there the same year. Soon, a Baptist church was also established in the area. The community around Milano became a voting precinct in 1880.

Hudson Store in Milano, Texas (around 1900)

Local sources offer several possibilities for the origin of the name "Milano". One story suggests that the town was simply named after Milan, Italy, because of similarities in the climate, but truly, the climate of Milan in Northern Italy, is cold and continental; another says that the name was supposed to have been "Milam", but the United States Post Office Department either got it wrong or changed it intentionally because another Milam, Texas, already existed.

Nevertheless, when the Gulf, Colorado and Santa Fe Railway built the section of track between Brenham and Belton in 1881, it established the town of Milano Junction at the railway's intersection with the International-Great Northern, about two miles east of Milano. As the focus of social and economic life shifted to the new town, Milano became "Old Milano" and Milano Junction became Milano. By the late 1880s, Milano was a commercial hub, with 500 residents, and served as a shipping point for cotton and hides produced in the area. Truck farming became an important industry for Milano in the 1920s, with tomatoes, watermelon, and cantaloupes as the principal crops.

The small city of Milano reached its population peak in 1939, when about 920 residents were reported to be living there. The number of local residents began to decline in the early 1940s, and fell to a low of 380 by the early 1970s, before beginning to grow again in the late 1970s. By the time Milano was finally incorporated in the early 1980s, the city officially had 468 residents.

== Demographics ==
Historical population
| Census | Pop. | Note | %± |
|---|---|---|---|
| 1980 | 468 | | — |
| 1990 | 408 | | −12.8% |
| 2000 | 400 | | −2.0% |
| 2010 | 428 | | 7.0% |
| 2020 | 390 | | −8.9% |
U.S. Decennial Census

=== 2020 census ===
As of the 2020 census, Milano had a population of 390 and a median age of 37.4 years. About 26.4% of residents were under 18 and 15.1% were 65 or older. For every 100 females, there were 101.0 males, and for every 100 females 18 and over. there were 99.3 males 18 and over.

Of the 139 households in Milano, 41.0% had children under 18 living in them, 51.8% were married-couple households, 21.6% were households with a male householder and no spouse or partner present, and 18.0% were households with a female householder and no spouse or partner present. About 20.8% of all households were made up of individuals, and 11.5% had someone living alone who was 65 or older.

The 156 housing units were 10.9% vacant. The homeowner vacancy rate was 1.8% and the rental vacancy rate was 8.6%.

None of residents lived in urban areas, while 100.0% lived in rural areas.

Racial composition as of the 2020 census
| Race | Number | Percent |
|---|---|---|
| White | 317 | 81.3% |
| Black or African American | 23 | 5.9% |
| American Indian and Alaska Native | 0 | 0.0% |
| Asian | 1 | 0.3% |
| Native Hawaiian and other Pacific Islander | 0 | 0.0% |
| Some other race | 31 | 7.9% |
| Two or more races | 18 | 4.6% |
| Hispanic or Latino (of any race) | 64 | 16.4% |

=== 2000 census ===
As of the 2000 census, 400 people, 151 households, and 112 families were residing in the city. The population density was 205.3 inhabitants per square mile (79.3/km^{2}). The 192 housing units had an average density of 98.5 per square mile (38.0/km^{2}). The racial makeup of the city was 82.00% White, 11.75% |African American, 2.00% Native American, 0.75% Asian, and 3.50% from other races. Hispanics or Latinos of any race were 11.50% of the population.

Of the 151 households, 36.4% had children under 18 living with them, 53.6% were married couples living together, 14.6% had a female householder with no husband present, and 25.2% were not families. About 23.2% of all households were made up of individuals, and 13.9% had someone living alone who was 65 or older. The average household size was 2.65 and the average family size was 3.13.

In the city, the age distribution was 27.8% under 18, 11.8% from 18 to 24, 24.8% from 25 to 44, 20.8% from 45 to 64, and 15.0% who were 65 or older. The median age was 38 years. For every 100 females, there were 88.7 males. For every 100 females 18 and over, there were 94.0 males.

The median income for a household in the city was $28,750 and for a family was $37,292. Males had a median income of $30,417 versus $19,107 for females. The per capita income for the city was $13,771. About 14.6% of families and 17.8% of the population were below the poverty line, including 23.0% of those under 18 and 9.4% of those 65 or over.

== Education ==
The City of Milano is served by the Milano Independent School District:

- Milano Elementary School (prekindergarten-grade 5)
- Milano Junior High School (grades 6–8)
- Milano High School (grades 9–12)
