= Thorndale Independent School District =

School district in Texas, United States

Address
- 300 North Main Street Thorndale, Texas, 76577; United States

District information
- Grades: PK–12
- Schools: 3
- NCES District ID: 4842630

Students and staff
- Students: 598
- Teachers: 54.76 (on an FTE basis)
- Student–teacher ratio: 10.92:1

Other information
- Website: www.thorndale.txed.net

Thorndale Independent School District is a public school district based in Thorndale, Texas (USA). Located in Milam County, the district extends into a small portion of Williamson County.

Thorndale ISD has one campus with three schools -

- Thorndale High School (Grades 9–12)
- Thorndale Middle (Grades 6–8)
- Thorndale Elementary (Grades PreK-5)

The Thorndale ISD, along with the Thrall (Tx) School, was a primary location used in filming The Rookie, the film starring Dennis Quaid about the life story of major league pitcher Jim Morris, who at the age of 35 tried out for and made it to a Major League team (based on a bet with his student athletes that he would try out if they won their district baseball championship). Morris played for the Tampa Bay Devil Rays for several years before retiring a second time from the Majors. Much of Thorndale was the actual location for the fictional Big Lake in the movie, including the High School baseball fields and locker room. Also, the downtown storefronts seen in the movie can still be seen in Thorndale's main downtown shopping district.

In 2009, the school district was rated "academically acceptable" by the Texas Education Agency.
