= Milano Independent School District =

School district in Texas, United States

Address
- 500 North 5th Street Milano, Texas, 76556; United States

District information
- Type: Public
- Grades: PK–12
- Schools: 3
- NCES District ID: 4830690

Students and staff
- Students: 411 (2023–2024)
- Teachers: 45.78 (on an FTE basis) (2023–2024)
- Staff: 33.97 (on an FTE basis) (2023–2024)
- Student–teacher ratio: 8.98 (2023–2024)

Other information
- Website: www.milanoisd.net

Milano Independent School District is a public school district based in Milano, Texas, United States, at 500 N. 5th Street. In 2017, the Eagles had their best football season ever, going 11–2.They captured the bidistrict championship and the area championship.

In 2009, the school district was rated "academically acceptable" by the Texas Education Agency.

== Schools ==
- Milano High (grades 9-12)
- Milano Junior High (grades 6-8)
- Milano Elementary (prekindergarten - grade 5)
