= Rockdale Independent School District =

School district in Texas, United States

Address
- 520 West Davilla Rockdale, Texas, 76567; United States

District information
- Type: Public
- Grades: PK–12
- Schools: 4
- NCES District ID: 4837590

Students and staff
- Students: 1,516 (2023–2024)
- Teachers: 123.35 (on an FTE basis) (2023–2024)
- Staff: 170.05 (on an FTE basis) (2023–2024)
- Student–teacher ratio: 12.29 (2023–2024)

Other information
- Website: www.rockdaleisd.net

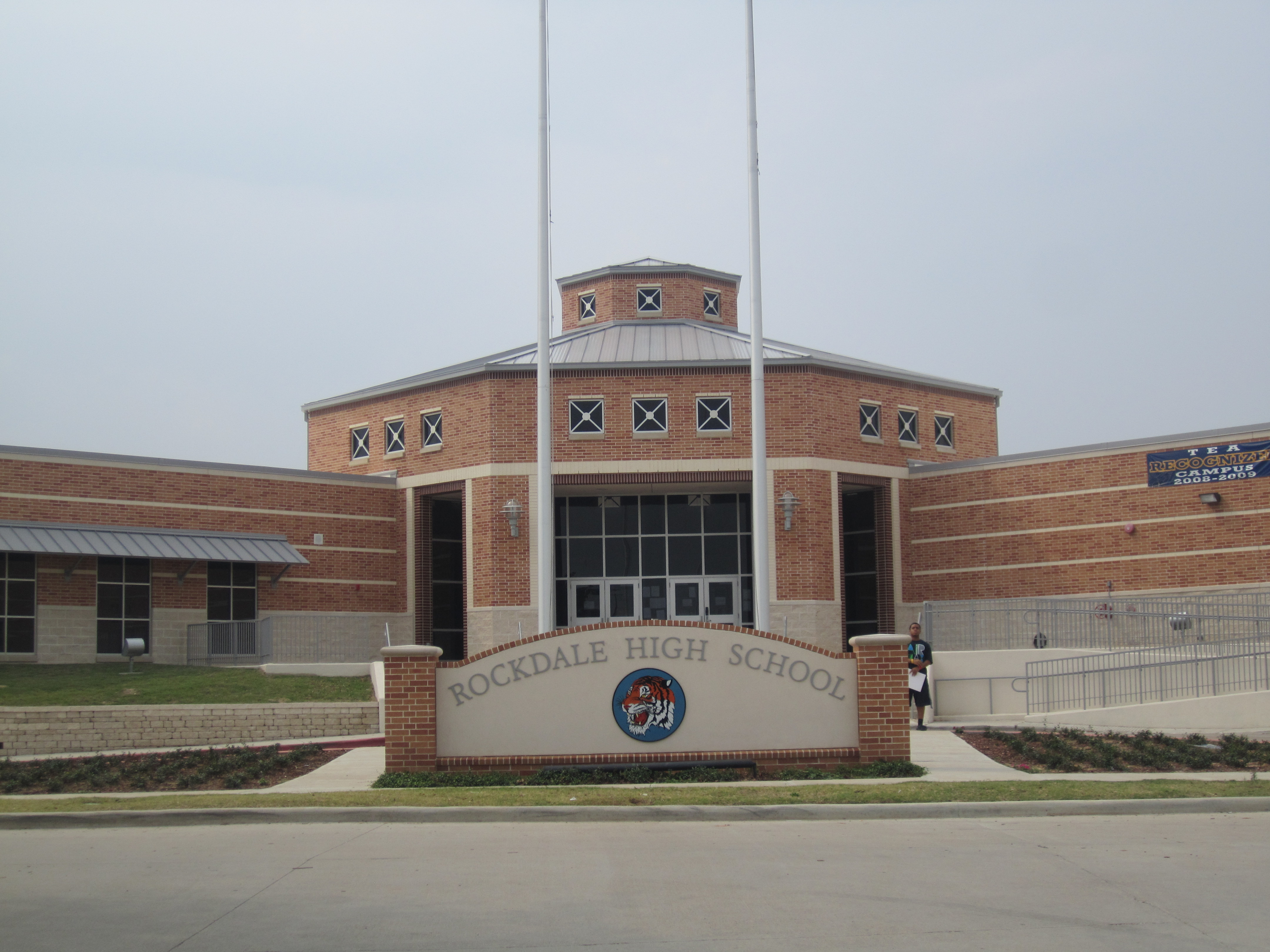
Rockdale High School

Rockdale Independent School District is a public school district based in Rockdale, Texas (USA).

In addition to Rockdale, it covers Praesel.

In 2011, the school district was rated "academically acceptable" by the Texas Education Agency.

== Schools ==
- Rockdale High School (grades 9–12)
  - 1984–85 National Blue Ribbon School
- Rockdale Junior High (grades 6–8)
- Rockdale Intermediate School (grades 3–5)
- Rockdale Elementary (grades PK–2)
- Prior to integration, African American students were served by Aycock High School.

== Athletics ==
The Rockdale Tigers participate in many sports. Rockdale High School's principal rival are the Cameron Yoemen, as the schools are about 15 minutes apart, separated by the Little River. The Rockdale Tigers and Cameron Yoemen football teams play in the "Battle of the Bell" every year.

Rockdale High School won state football championships in 1976 and in 2017 and boys track & field titles in 1977 and 2016. The now-defunct Aycock High School won the PVIL class A football championship in 1955 and the boys basketball championship in 1956.
