= Cameron Independent School District =

School district in Texas, United States

Address
- 304 East 12th Cameron, Texas, 76520; United States

District information
- Type: Public
- Grades: PK–12
- Schools: 4
- NCES District ID: 4812640

Students and staff
- Students: 1,517 (2023–2024)
- Teachers: 114.13 (on an FTE basis) (2023–2024)
- Staff: 133.57 (on an FTE basis) (2023–2024)
- Student–teacher ratio: 13.29 (2023–2024)

Other information
- Website: www.cameronisd.net

Cameron Independent School District is a public school district based in Cameron, Texas. Founded in 1921 by Charles Yoe. The district covers much of north central Milam County, including Cameron, Ben Arnold, and a piece of Burlington.

In 2010, the school district was rated "academically acceptable" by the Texas Education Agency.

== Schools ==
- C.H. Yoe High School (Grades 9-12)
- Cameron Junior High School (Grades 6-8)
- Cameron Elementary School (Grades 3-5)
- Ben Milam Elementary School (Grades PK-2)

== Special programs ==
- Temple College Education Center at Cameron is used for dual credit and intro college courses such as College Writing, British Literature, Government, Economics, Psychology, Speech, American History and Biology (as of Fall 2008).
