= Rockdale, Texas =

- City
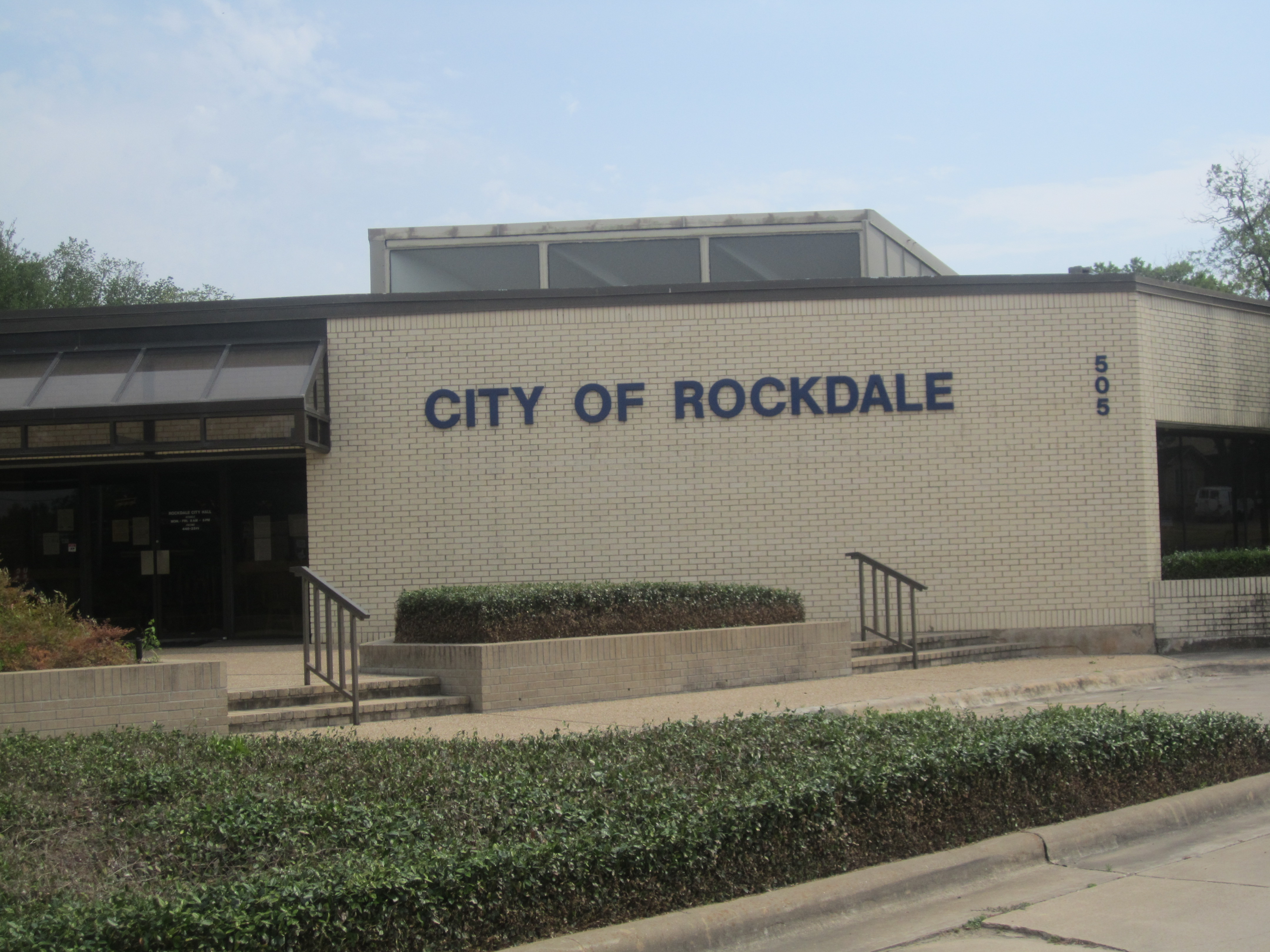
- Rockdale City Hall
- Motto: "Great Things Happen Here"
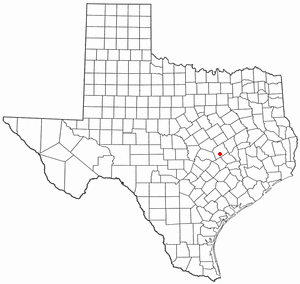
- Location of Rockdale, Texas

- Coordinates: 30°39′17″N 97°0′27″W
- Country: United States
- State: Texas
- County: Milam

Area
  - Total: 4.01 sq mi (10.39 km^{2})
  - Land: 4.01 sq mi (10.39 km^{2})
  - Water: 0 sq mi (0.00 km^{2})
- Elevation: 466 ft (142 m)

Population (2020)
  - Total: 5,323
  - Density: 1,371.2/sq mi (529.42/km^{2})
- Time zone: UTC-6 (Central (CST))
  - Summer (DST): UTC-5 (CDT)
- ZIP code: 76567
- Area code: 512
- FIPS code: 48-62672
- GNIS feature ID: 1366723
- Website: City of Rockdale, Texas

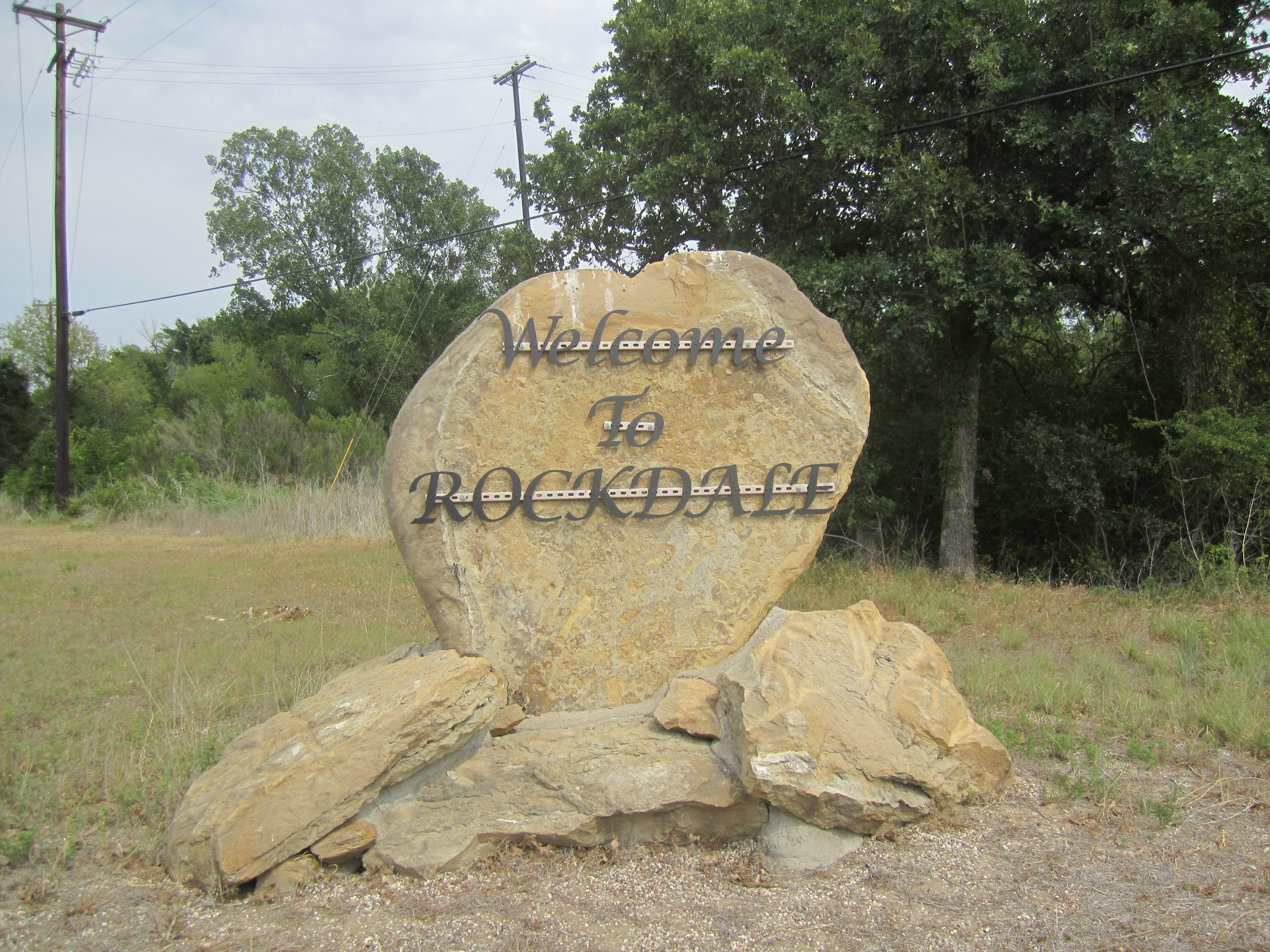
Rockdale welcome sign

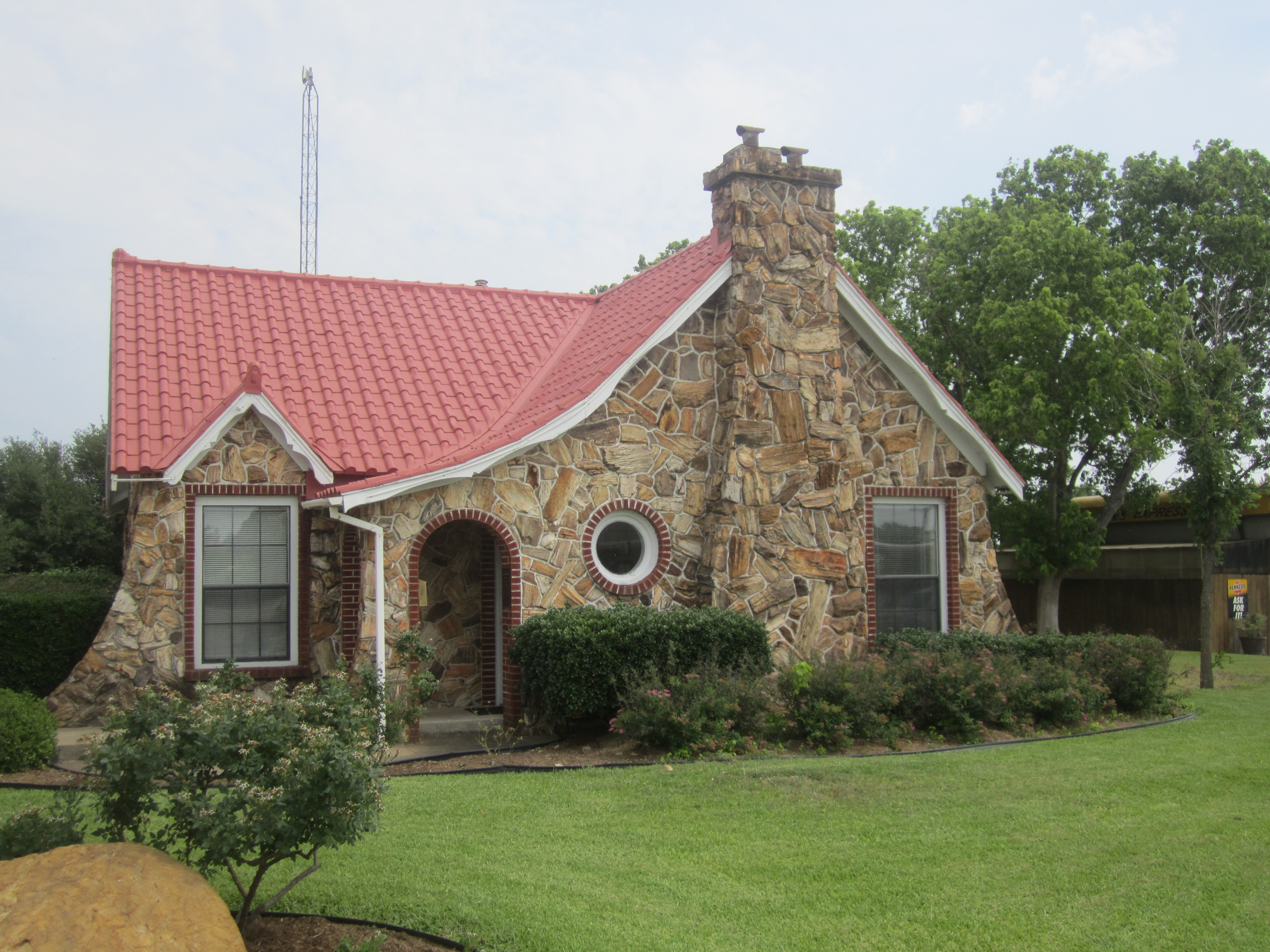
Chamber of Commerce building

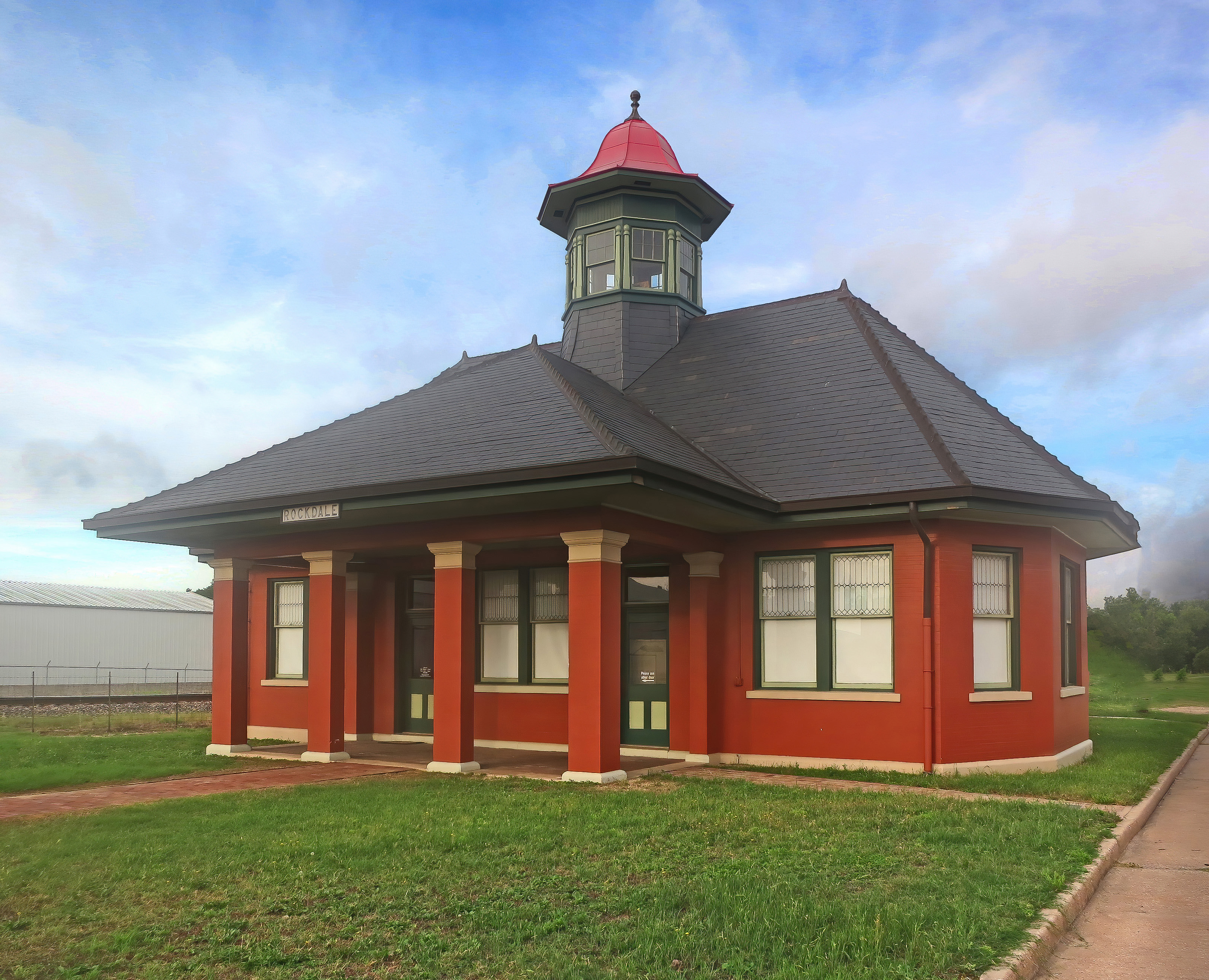
International-Great Northern Railroad Passenger Depot, now a museum

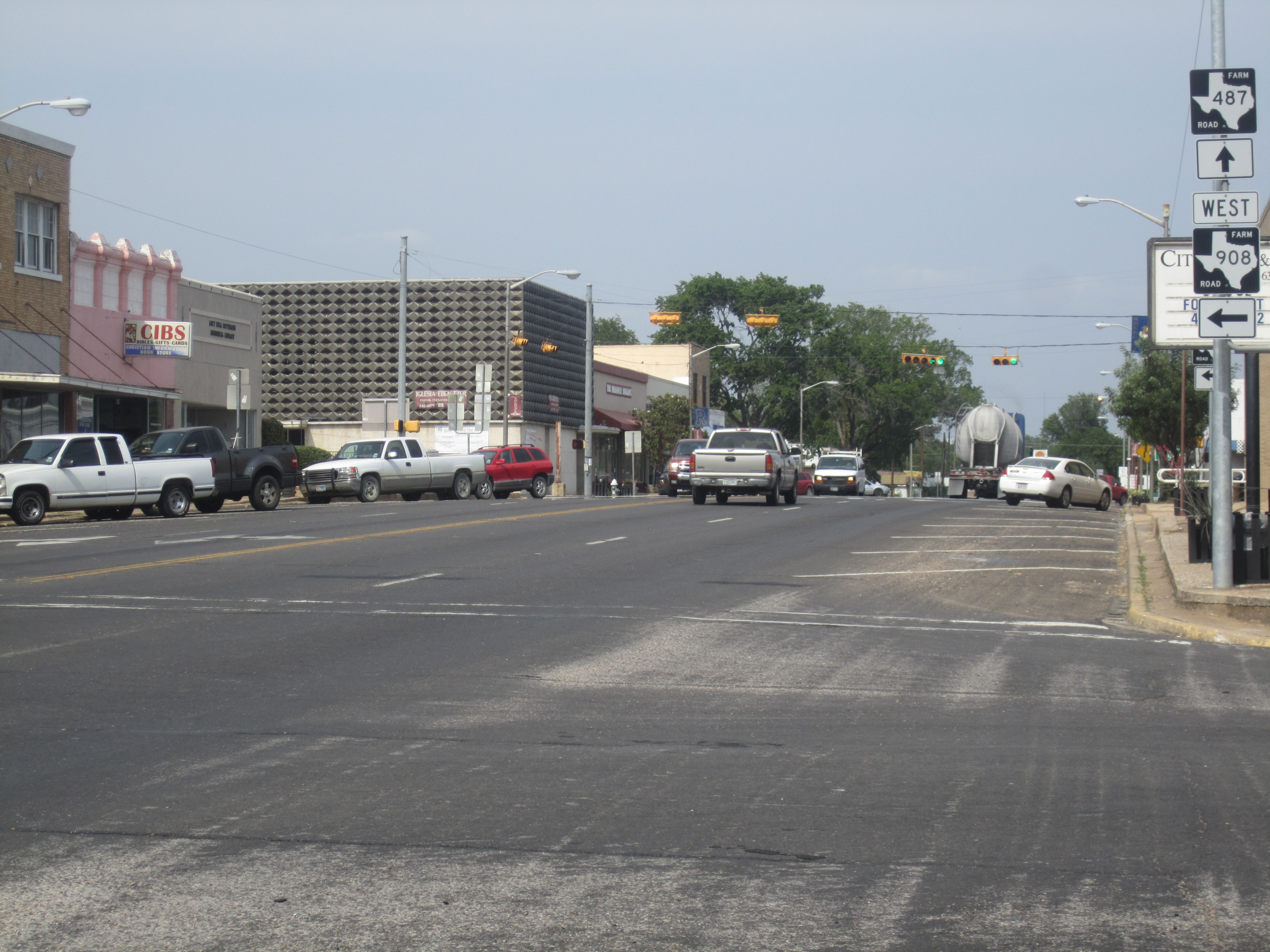
U.S. 79 is the main street of Rockdale.

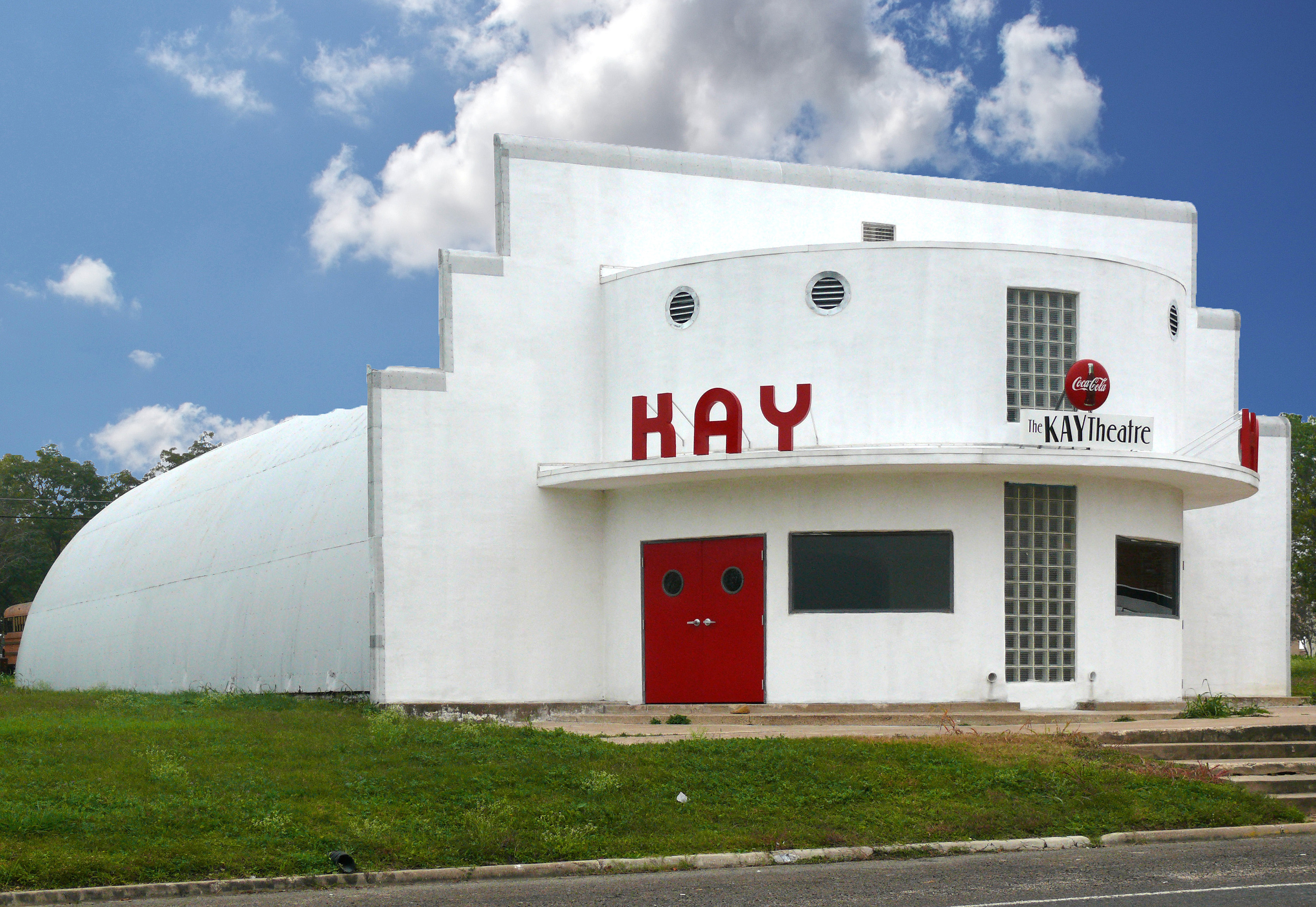
Kay Theater

Rockdale is a city in Milam County, Texas, United States. Its population was 5,323 at the 2020 census. It is approximately 41 miles west of College Station.

== History ==
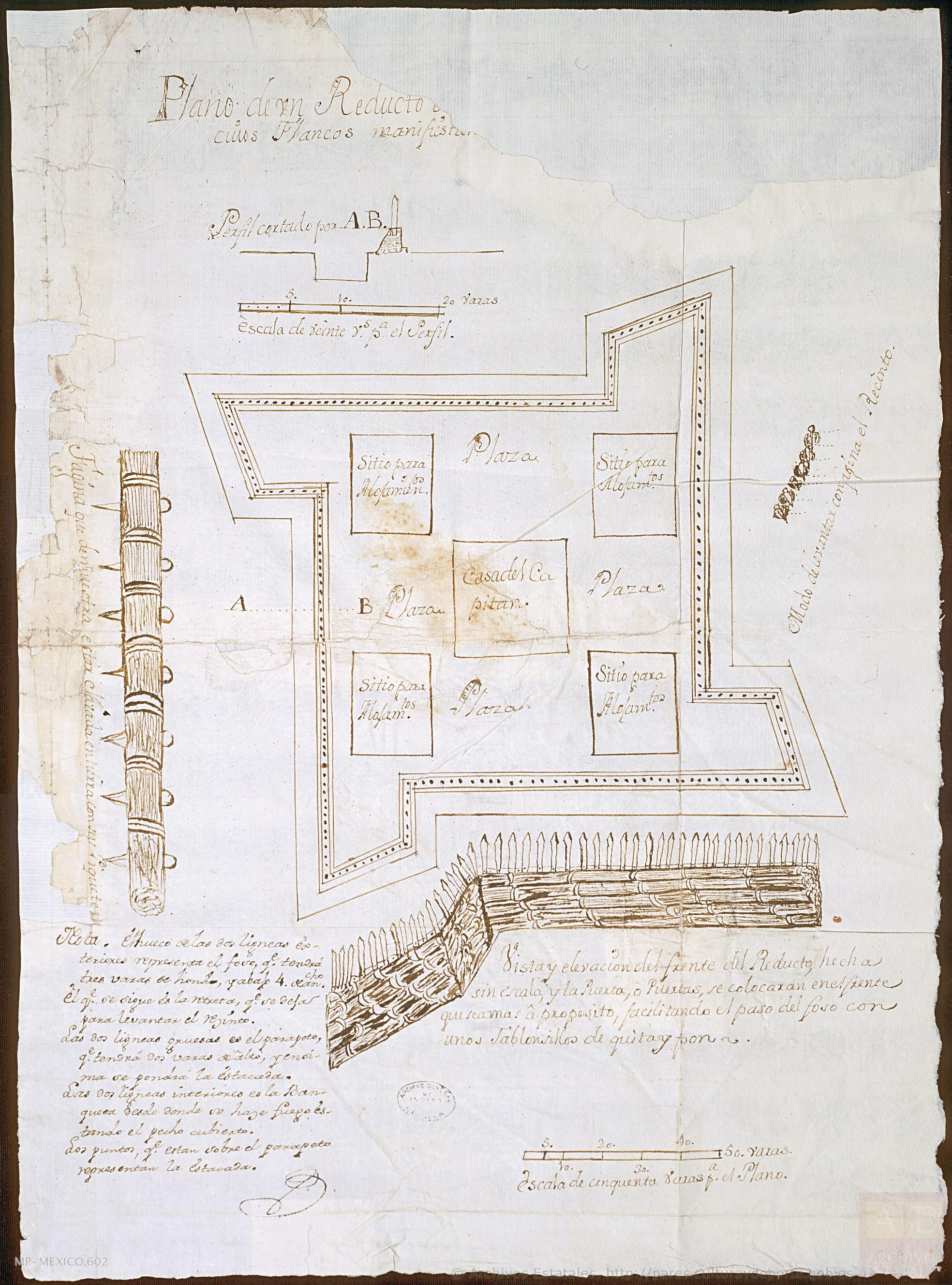
Planta y perfil del reducto proyectado en las márgenes del río San Javier, en la provincia de Texas

As a passing point of the "Camino Real" and the establishment of three missions in the area, a wooden fort was established on the south bank of the San Xavier River, to protect those missions, circa 1751. The fort was called San Francisco Xavier de Gigedo Presidio.

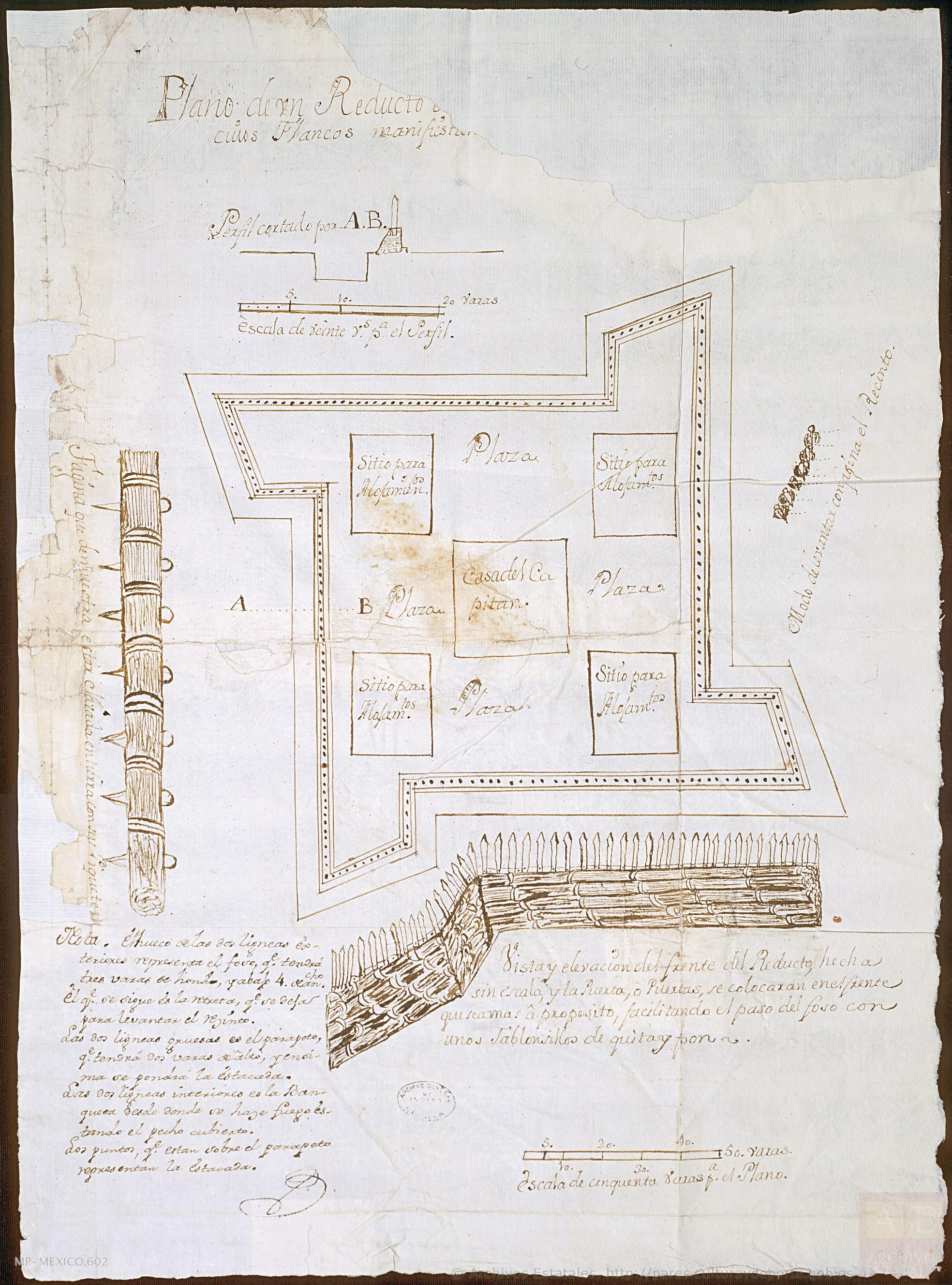
Planta y perfil del reducto proyectado en las márgenes del río San Javier, en la provincia de Texas

In 1873, the town developed as the International-Great Northern Railroad came through the area. Rockdale was named for a nearby rock that stood 12 feet high and had a circumference of 20 feet. Rockdale was incorporated in 1878. The rock's location was subsequently lost, and is believed to be north of the city limits.

== Geography ==
Rockdale is located at 30°39′17″N 97°0′27″W (30.654674, –97.007439).

According to the United States Census Bureau, the city has a total area of 3.1 square miles (8.0 km^{2}), all land.

=== Climate ===
The climate in this area is characterized by hot, humid summers and generally mild to cool winters. According to the Köppen climate classification, Rockdale has a humid subtropical climate, Cfa on climate maps.

== Demographics ==
Historical population
Census	Pop.	Note	%±
1880	1,185		—
1890	1,505		27.0%
1900	2,515		67.1%
1910	2,073		−17.6%
1920	2,323		12.1%
1930	2,204		−5.1%
1940	2,136		−3.1%
1950	2,321		8.7%
1960	4,481		93.1%
1970	4,655		3.9%
1980	5,611		20.5%
1990	5,235		−6.7%
2000	5,439		3.9%
2010	5,595		2.9%
2020	5,323		−4.9%
U.S. Decennial Census

Demographic statistics below rely on the United States Census Bureau's decennial counts.

=== Racial and ethnic composition ===
Racial composition as of the 2020 census
Race	Number	Percent
White	3,326	62.5%
Black or African American	643	12.1%
American Indian and Alaska Native	40	0.8%
Asian	36	0.7%
Native Hawaiian and Other Pacific Islander	6	0.1%
Some other race	595	11.2%
Two or more races	677	12.7%
Hispanic or Latino (of any race)	1,686	31.7%

=== 2020 census ===
As of the 2020 census, Rockdale had a population of 5,323, 2,137 households, and 1,154 families. The median age was 38.2 years, with 25.2% of residents under the age of 18 and 18.4% of residents 65 or older; for every 100 females there were 90.7 males and for every 100 females age 18 and over there were 84.8 males age 18 and over.

96.5% of residents lived in urban areas, while 3.5% lived in rural areas.

There were 2,137 households in Rockdale, of which 33.0% had children under the age of 18 living in them. Of all households, 40.0% were married-couple households, 18.3% were households with a male householder and no spouse or partner present, and 35.0% were households with a female householder and no spouse or partner present. About 31.8% of all households were made up of individuals and 15.6% had someone living alone who was 65 years of age or older.

There were 2,519 housing units, of which 15.2% were vacant. The homeowner vacancy rate was 2.5% and the rental vacancy rate was 17.5%.

=== 2000 census ===
As of the 2000 census, 5,595 people, 2,088 households, and 1,395 families were residing in the city. The population density was 1,343.3 inhabitants per square mile (518.7/km^{2}). The 2,379 housing units averaged 759.2 per square mile (293.5/km^{2}). The racial makeup of the city was 70.69% White, 14.29% African American, 0.35% Native American, 0.42% Asian, 12.23% from other races, and 2.02% from two or more races. Hispanics or Latinos of any race were 21.93% of the population.

Of the 2,077 households, 33.1% had children under 18 living with them, 51.9% were married couples living together, 13.0% had a female householder with no husband present, and 31.6% were not families. About 28.2% of all households were made up of individuals, and 15.6% had someone living alone who was 65 or older. The average household size was 2.55, and the average family size was 3.14.

In the city, the age distribution was 28.5% under 18, 8.2% from 18 to 24, 24.7% from 25 to 44, 19.6% from 45 to 64, and 19.1% who were 65 or older. The median age was 36 years. For every 100 females, there were 89.4 males. For every 100 females age 18 and over, there were 83.1 males.

The median income for a household in the city was $34,612, and for a family was $39,491. Males had a median income of $30,758 versus $20,692 for females. The per capita income for the city was $17,618. About 13.2% of families and 18.3% of the population were below the poverty line, including 27.7% of those under age 18 and 9.7% of those age 65 or over.

== Economy ==
Rockdale was the site of a large Alcoa aluminium smelting facility, which could produce 1.67 million pounds of aluminum per day. The Alcoa plant profoundly changed the city, as noted in a Saturday Evening Post article by Rockdale native George Sessions Perry. Within a few years of its arrival in 1952, Rockdale almost doubled in population, changing in character from a predominantly agricultural economy to one heavily driven by manufacturing jobs. Smelting operations were halted at the Alcoa plant in 2008. The Alcoa plant closed in February 2014 when production at the atomizer ceased.

Rockdale was also the site of the Sandow Power Plant, which closed in 2018.

Two cryptocurrency miners, Bitdeer, a division of Bitmain, and Riot Platforms, formerly known as Bioptix, occupy former Alcoa facilities less than half a mile apart in Rockdale, using electricity transmission lines built to connect smelters to the power plant. As of 2023, the Riot Platforms facility was the most energy-intensive Bitcoin mining operation in the United States, consuming as much electricity as the nearest 300,000 homes and producing 1.92 million tons of carbon emissions per year.

== Education ==
The City of Rockdale is served by the Rockdale Independent School District.

== Media ==
- The Rockdale Reporter (newspaper)
- KRXT radio

== Notable people ==
- Stan Blinka, a former NFL linebacker for the New York Jets, played for Rockdale High School.
- Lee Roy Caffey, an NFL linebacker, was born in Rockdale and retired there.
- Le'Raven Clark, an NFL player with the Philadelphia Eagles, is from Rockdale.
- Kenneth Cockrell, a NASA astronaut, graduated from Rockdale High School in 1968.
- Pee Wee Crayton, blues guitarist, was born in Rockdale.
- Mary Sue Whipp Hubbard, the third wife of L. Ron Hubbard, was a Rockdale native.
- Dan Kubiak served several terms in the Texas House of Representatives while living in Rockdale. His younger brother, L. B. Kubiak, also a Rockdale resident, held the same House seat from 1983 to 1991.
- Billy Ray Locklin, a former AFL and Canadian Football League defensive back, played for Aycock High School in Rockdale.
- Gordon McKee, a former track-and-field athlete, competed for Rockdale High School. Track & Field News ranked McKee 9th in the world in the long jump twice — first in 1990 and again in 1992.
- Liz Galloway McQuitter, born in Rockdale, played professional basketball in the Women's Professional Basketball League, coached women's college basketball, and retired as head coach of the Rockdale High School Lady Tigers.
- Claire Myers Owens, author
- George Sessions Perry, an author, was born in Rockdale, lived much of his life there and set some of his books either in Rockdale or in fictional towns based on Rockdale. He wrote an article about Alcoa coming to Rockdale in the Saturday Evening Post titled "The Town Where It Rains Money".
- Sam Williams, a former NFL defensive back, played for Rockdale High School.
- Leroy Wright, a former American Basketball Association player and coach, played basketball and football at Aycock High School in Rockdale.
- Joseph S. Stiborik was the radar operator on the Enola Gay.
