= Cameron, Texas =

City in Texas

- City
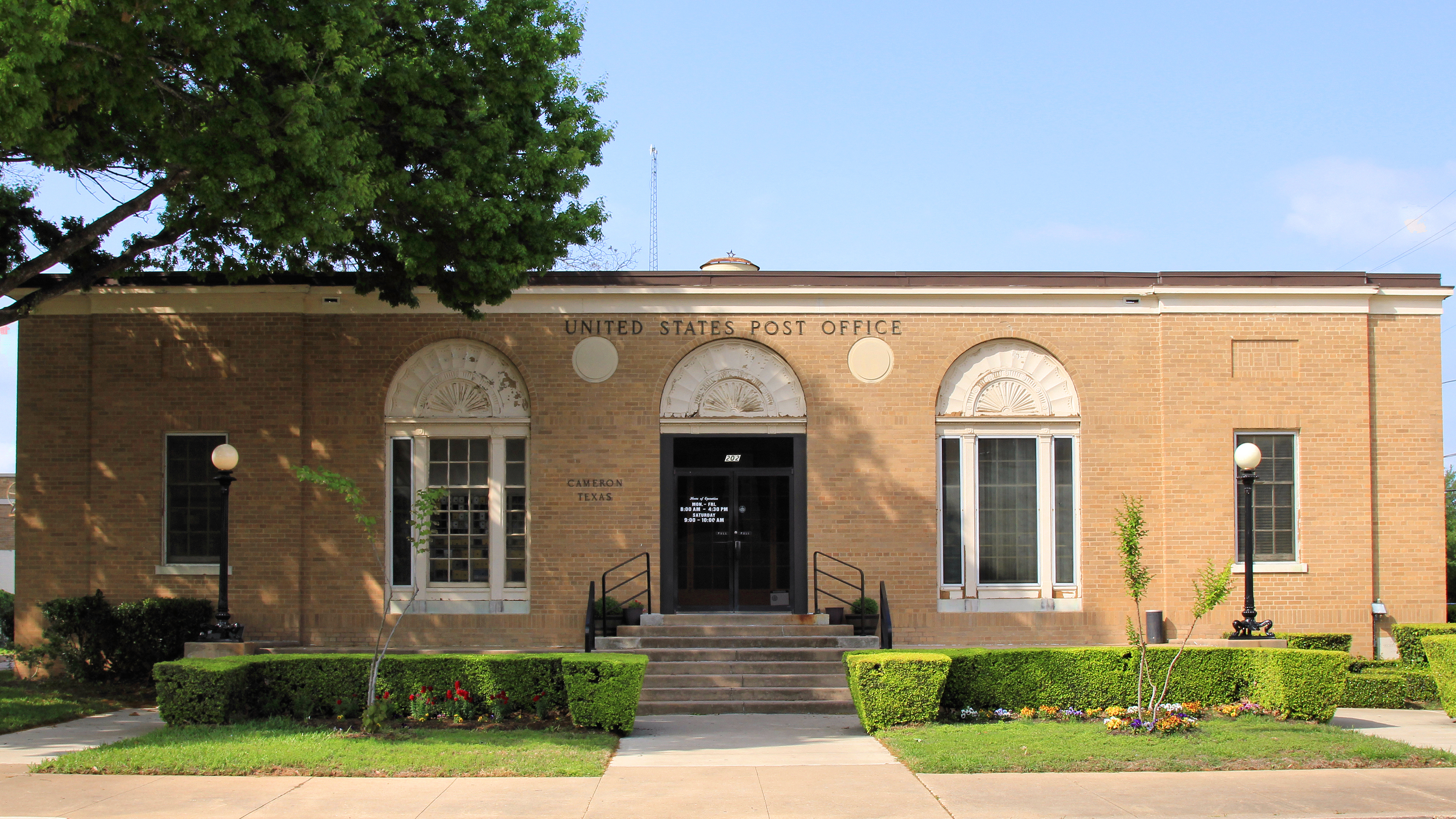
- Cameron Post Office
- Nickname: "Hometown, Texas"
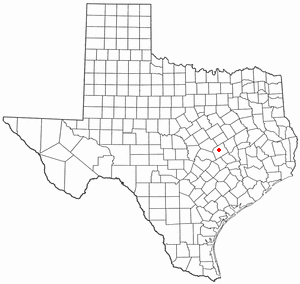
- Location of Cameron, Texas

- Location within Texas Location within the United States
- Coordinates: 30°51′16″N 96°58′43″W
- Country: United States
- State: Texas
- County: Milam
- Established: 1846

Area
  - Total: 5.24 sq mi (13.57 km^{2})
  - Land: 5.24 sq mi (13.57 km^{2})
  - Water: 0 sq mi (0.00 km^{2})
- Elevation: 400 ft (120 m)

Population (2020)
  - Total: 5,306
  - Density: 1,043.0/sq mi (402.72/km^{2})
- Time zone: UTC-6 (Central (CST))
  - Summer (DST): UTC-5 (CDT)
- ZIP code: 76520
- Area code: 254
- FIPS code: 48-12040
- GNIS feature ID: 1353598
- Website: www.camerontexas.net

Cameron is a city and the county seat of Milam County, Texas, United States. Its population was 5,306 at the 2020 census.

== Geography ==
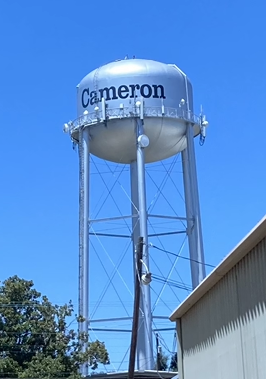
Water tower in Cameron

Cameron is located at 30°51′16″N 96°58′43″W (30.854544, –96.978716). It is situated at the junction of U.S. Highways 77 and 190, approximately 71 miles northeast of Austin in north-central Milam County.

According to the United States Census Bureau, the city has a total area of 4.2 square miles (11 km^{2}), all land.

=== Climate ===
Climate data for Cameron, Texas (1991–2020)
| Month | Jan | Feb | Mar | Apr | May | Jun | Jul | Aug | Sep | Oct | Nov | Dec | Year |
|---|---|---|---|---|---|---|---|---|---|---|---|---|---|
| Mean daily maximum °F (°C) | 60.8 (16.0) | 65.8 (18.8) | 71.9 (22.2) | 78.1 (25.6) | 84.5 (29.2) | 91.0 (32.8) | 93.9 (34.4) | 94.5 (34.7) | 89.8 (32.1) | 81.0 (27.2) | 70.9 (21.6) | 63.3 (17.4) | 78.8 (26.0) |
| Daily mean °F (°C) | 49.8 (9.9) | 54.6 (12.6) | 61.0 (16.1) | 67.5 (19.7) | 74.9 (23.8) | 81.3 (27.4) | 83.3 (28.5) | 83.8 (28.8) | 78.8 (26.0) | 69.1 (20.6) | 59.5 (15.3) | 52.1 (11.2) | 68.0 (20.0) |
| Mean daily minimum °F (°C) | 38.7 (3.7) | 43.4 (6.3) | 50.1 (10.1) | 57.0 (13.9) | 65.3 (18.5) | 71.6 (22.0) | 72.6 (22.6) | 73.0 (22.8) | 67.8 (19.9) | 57.3 (14.1) | 48.1 (8.9) | 41.0 (5.0) | 57.2 (14.0) |
| Average precipitation inches (mm) | 2.60 (66) | 2.35 (60) | 2.90 (74) | 2.32 (59) | 5.28 (134) | 3.61 (92) | 2.61 (66) | 2.51 (64) | 3.89 (99) | 4.29 (109) | 3.11 (79) | 3.13 (80) | 38.6 (982) |
| Average snowfall inches (cm) | 0.0 (0.0) | 0.1 (0.25) | 0.0 (0.0) | 0.0 (0.0) | 0.0 (0.0) | 0.0 (0.0) | 0.0 (0.0) | 0.0 (0.0) | 0.0 (0.0) | 0.0 (0.0) | 0.0 (0.0) | 0.0 (0.0) | 0.1 (0.25) |
Source: NOAA

== History ==
=== Early years ===
Soon after Texas became a U.S. state, the Texas Legislature authorized a seven-member commission to find a permanent site for the Milam County seat. The commission purchased a 60-acre tract of Daniel Monroe's headright on the Little River in 1846 and named the new community Cameron after Ewen Cameron, a Scottish highlander prominent in the Texas Revolution and a member of the Mier Expedition during the war with Mexico. When the courthouse in Cameron was completed later that year, county records were transferred to Cameron from Nashville—a community situated along the Brazos River that had served as the Milam County seat during the period when Texas was an independent republic. The new town struggled due to its isolated location, with the nearest railroad being 50 miles away. In the late 1840s and early 1850s, several attempts were made to navigate the Little River to give Cameron easier access to trade routes. The most successful attempts occurred in 1850 after heavy rains made the river rise. J.W. McCown Sr. persuaded Captain Basil M. Hatfield to bring his steamboat Washington through the upper Brazos up to the Little River. The steamboat and the merchandise it brought caused great excitement among the locals, and a two-day celebration was held when the boat tied up 2.5 miles east of Cameron. Despite this, however, navigation of the river was impractical on a regular basis, and places such as Port Sullivan and Nashville developed into Milam County's dominant business centers during the 1850s and 1860s. More competition came in the 1870s when nearby Rockdale was established on the International-Great Northern Railroad. Faced with these challenges, some Milam County residents began to question whether Cameron should remain the county seat instead of the newly prosperous town of Rockdale. Elections were held in 1874 and 1880 on the issue, with the results going in favor of maintaining the status quo.

=== Incorporation and growth ===
In 1881, the Gulf, Colorado and Santa Fe Railway arrived in Cameron. This improved the local economy and led to population growth. Between 1878 and 1884, the total number of residents increased by 60%, from around 500 to 800. Cameron had attempted to incorporate in 1856, 1866, and 1873, but each time the charter was allowed to lapse. It was officially incorporated in 1889. The San Antonio and Aransas Pass Railway arrived in 1890, giving the town another boost. By 1892, the population stood at nearly 2,000.

Although cotton dominated the economy of Cameron during the 19th century, the 20th century brought more diversified industries. The discovery of oil in neighboring Williamson County in 1915 prompted Milam County residents to initiate their own exploration. The Minerva-Rockdale oil field, discovered in 1921, provided new opportunities for investment. In the 1920s and 1930s, several milk-product companies also operated in Cameron, including the Kraft-Phenix Cheese Corporation. At the 1930 census, the population was 4,565. That figure rose to 5,040 in 1940.

=== Modern times ===
Cameron residents received much-needed job opportunities in the 1950s when the Aluminum Company of America built a plant southwest of Rockdale. Jobs at the plant, as well as the lignite industry that supplied the plant's power, revitalized the economy of Milam County. Between 1950 and 1960, Cameron registered an increase of 588 residents, from 5,052 to 5,640.

This level of growth would not continue, however. The Texas and New Orleans Railroad discontinued its track from Cameron south to Giddings. Southern Pacific, which had taken over the Texas and New Orleans, abandoned its track from Cameron north to Rosebud. The population continued to experience slight fluctuations throughout the remainder of the late 20th century. The Alcoa plant closed in 2009.

Since 2010, the annual Burning Flipside festival has been held at the nearby Apache Pastures campground, drawing tourists to the area.

On February 23, 2021, a collision between a flatbed tractor-trailer and a BNSF railroad train on Farm to Market Road 2095 near Cameron caused a derailment. The train's petroleum cargo exploded, resulting in the evacuation of nearby homes. At least one structure burned, but no loss of life or injuries were reported.

Since Oct of 2021, the City of Cameron and the Downtown Square have been experiencing a renaissance as the community has started to renovate the historic buildings and add numerous businesses. The City also hosts numerous downtown festivals, car shows and parades.

== Demographics ==
Historical population
| Census | Pop. | Note | %± |
|---|---|---|---|
| 1880 | 441 | | — |
| 1890 | 1,608 | | 264.6% |
| 1900 | 3,341 | | 107.8% |
| 1910 | 3,263 | | −2.3% |
| 1920 | 4,298 | | 31.7% |
| 1930 | 4,565 | | 6.2% |
| 1940 | 5,040 | | 10.4% |
| 1950 | 5,052 | | 0.2% |
| 1960 | 5,640 | | 11.6% |
| 1970 | 5,546 | | −1.7% |
| 1980 | 5,721 | | 3.2% |
| 1990 | 5,580 | | −2.5% |
| 2000 | 5,634 | | 1.0% |
| 2010 | 5,552 | | −1.5% |
| 2020 | 5,306 | | −4.4% |
U.S. Decennial Census

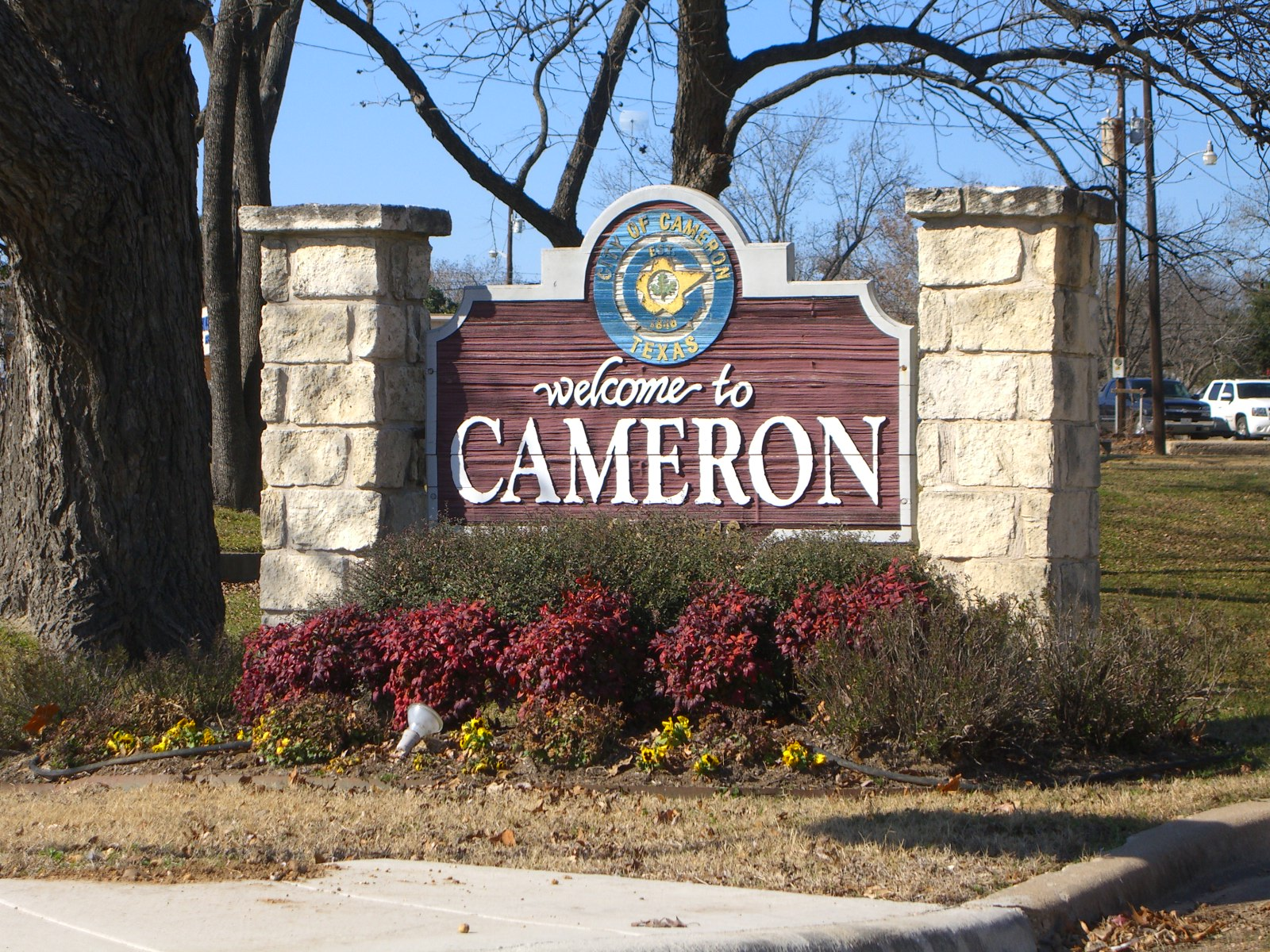
A "Welcome to Cameron" sign

=== 2020 census ===
As of the 2020 census, Cameron had a population of 5,306, 2,004 households, and 1,209 families residing in the city. The median age was 41.1 years, with 24.4% of residents under the age of 18 and 22.0% aged 65 years or older. For every 100 females there were 95.1 males, and for every 100 females age 18 and over there were 95.2 males age 18 and over.

Racial composition as of the 2020 census
| Race | Percent |
|---|---|
| White | 53.4% |
| Black or African American | 19.0% |
| American Indian and Alaska Native | 0.6% |
| Asian | 0.5% |
| Native Hawaiian and Other Pacific Islander | <0.1% |
| Some other race | 15.3% |
| Two or more races | 11.2% |
| Hispanic or Latino (of any race) | 36.9% |

97.1% of residents lived in urban areas, while 2.9% lived in rural areas.

There were 2,004 households in Cameron, of which 31.5% had children under the age of 18 living in them. Of all households, 39.5% were married-couple households, 20.3% were households with a male householder and no spouse or partner present, and 33.6% were households with a female householder and no spouse or partner present. About 31.0% of all households were made up of individuals and 16.1% had someone living alone who was 65 years of age or older.

There were 2,288 housing units, of which 12.4% were vacant. Among occupied housing units, 57.2% were owner-occupied and 42.8% were renter-occupied. The homeowner vacancy rate was 1.6% and the rental vacancy rate was 7.8%.

=== 2000 census ===
As of the census of 2000, 5,634 people, 2,090 households, and 1,404 families were residing in the city. The population density was 1,327.9 people/sq mi (513.0/km^{2}). The 2,383 housing units averaged 561.6/sq mi (217.0/km^{2}). The racial makeup of the city was 66.68% White, 20.66% African American, 0.60% Native American, 0.16% Asian, 10.17% from other races, and 1.72% from two or more races. Hispanics or Latinos of any race were 26.66% of the population.

Of the 2,090 households, 32.9% had children under 18 living with them, 45.9% were married couples living together, 17.2% had a female householder with no husband present, and 32.8% were not families. About 31.2% of all households were made up of individuals, and 18.4% had someone living alone who was 65 or older. The average household size was 2.58, and the average family size was 3.25.

In the city, the age distribution was 28.0% under 18, 9.0% from 18 to 24, 23.3% from 25 to 44, 19.7% from 45 to 64, and 20.0% who were 65 or older. The median age was 37 years. For every 100 females, there were 86.8 males. For every 100 females age 18 and over, there were 79.9 males.

The median income for a household in the city was $25,878, and for a family was $30,927. Males had a median income of $23,988 versus $18,497 for females. The per capita income for the city was $14,122. About 20.8% of families and 22.0% of the population were below the poverty line, including 26.8% of those under age 18 and 22.4% of those age 65 or over.

== Education ==
The City of Cameron is served by the Cameron Independent School District.

== Notable people ==
- Daniel E. Garcia, bishop of the Diocese of Austin in Texas, was born and grew up in Cameron
- William Graham Gillis Jr., killed in France during WWII, was from Cameron. He is the namesake of Gillis Field House at West Point
- Virgil Johnson, lead singer of The Velvets and retired educator, was born in Cameron
- Manse Jolly, a Confederate during the Civil War, lived in Cameron for two years at the end of his life
- Drayton McLane Jr., a third-generation leader of McLane Company, a former owner of the Houston Astros, and namesake for McLane Stadium, was born and grew up in Cameron
- Dede Westbrook, wide receiver for the NFL's Minnesota Vikings, is a native of Cameron
- Sam Williams, a former NFL player for the San Diego Chargers, was born in Cameron

== Climate ==
The climate in this area is characterized by hot, humid summers and generally mild to cool winters. According to the Köppen climate classification, Cameron has a humid subtropical climate, Cfa on climate maps.
