= Citrus Grove, Texas =

Citrus Grove
- Unincorporated community
- Interactive map of Citrus Grove
- Location within Texas Citrus Grove (the United States)
- Coordinates: 28°44′51″N 96°6′21″W
- Country: United States
- State: Texas
- County: Matagorda County

Citrus Grove is a populated unincorporated place in southwestern Matagorda County, Texas, United States.

== History ==
The community was established in 1908 with the name Satsuma, referring to the citrus plants that were planted there, to attract farmers from midwestern states such as Kansas and Nebraska. However, the name was changed at an unknown date as the name Satsuma was preceded by another community in the state. The first settlers would arrive in 1909, and by the 1920s, families from East Texas counties such as Bullington, Jenkins, Brown, Wells, Wood and Harvey, would migrate to the area.

The first school, and post office would open in 1910, when the population was 25. The school was held in a house near a United Brethren church, and the school was also utilized a meeting place for the church community. The school then expanded in two separate locations; the students living in the north of the area would attend the original schoolhouse near the church, meanwhile the students living in the south of the area would attend the building located in center of the area. The school district would then be consolidated into Collegeport's, and the remaining schoolhouse would then be utilized as Citrus Grove's community center until 1977.

In 1914, a community-wide epidemic of the anthrax broke out, killing all the workstocks in the area.

Roads were built in the area in 1930; six pairs of 9 foot (274 cms) slabs were placed along Elmaton and State Highway 35 that connected Collegeport and Citrus Grove, however there was not enough money to build small roads that would have led to the smaller cities surrounding it.

By 1936, the community only had 8 scattered residences, and by 1948, the community reported a business and 50 dwellings. By 2000, the population was 15.
