= Hawkinsville, Texas =

Former human settlement in Texas, United States

- Unincorporated community
- Location of Hawkinsville in Texas Hawkinsville, Texas (the United States)
- Coordinates: 28°53′16″N 95°40′11″W
- Country: United States
- State: Texas
- County: Matagorda
- Founded: 1908
- Elevation: 16 ft (4.9 m)
- Time zone: UTC-6 (Central (CST))
  - Summer (DST): UTC-5 (CDT)
- Zip code: 77414
- Area code: 361
- GNIS feature ID: 1379577

Hawkinsville is an unincorporated community in Matagorda County, Texas, United States.

== Description ==
In 2018, there were a few homes nearby, several businesses one mile (1.6 km) to the south, and the name appeared on maps, but one source refers to the place in the past tense, while a second source states that the town disappeared in the 1950s. The town site is between Cedar Lane and Sargent.

== Geography ==
Hawkinsville is located in southeast Matagorda County, 17 miles (27 km) southeast of Van Vleck. The historic site of Hawkinsville is on FM 457 1.0 mile (1.6 km) north of its intersection with FM 2611. A bend of Caney Creek comes near FM 457 at the location. A single home can be seen near the historic location.

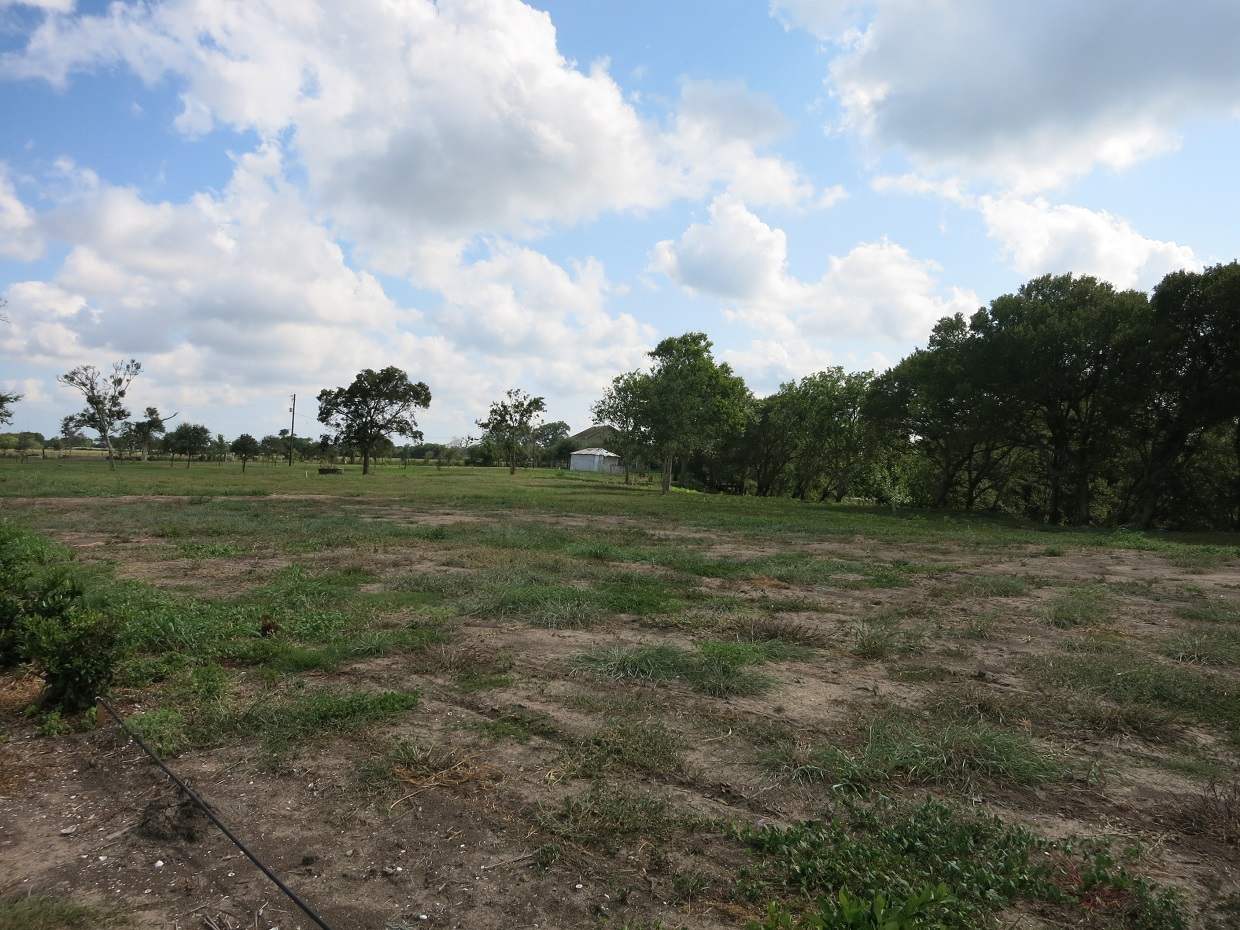
Historic site of Hawkinsville is on FM 457 about 1 mile north of FM 2611. Caney Creek is on the right.

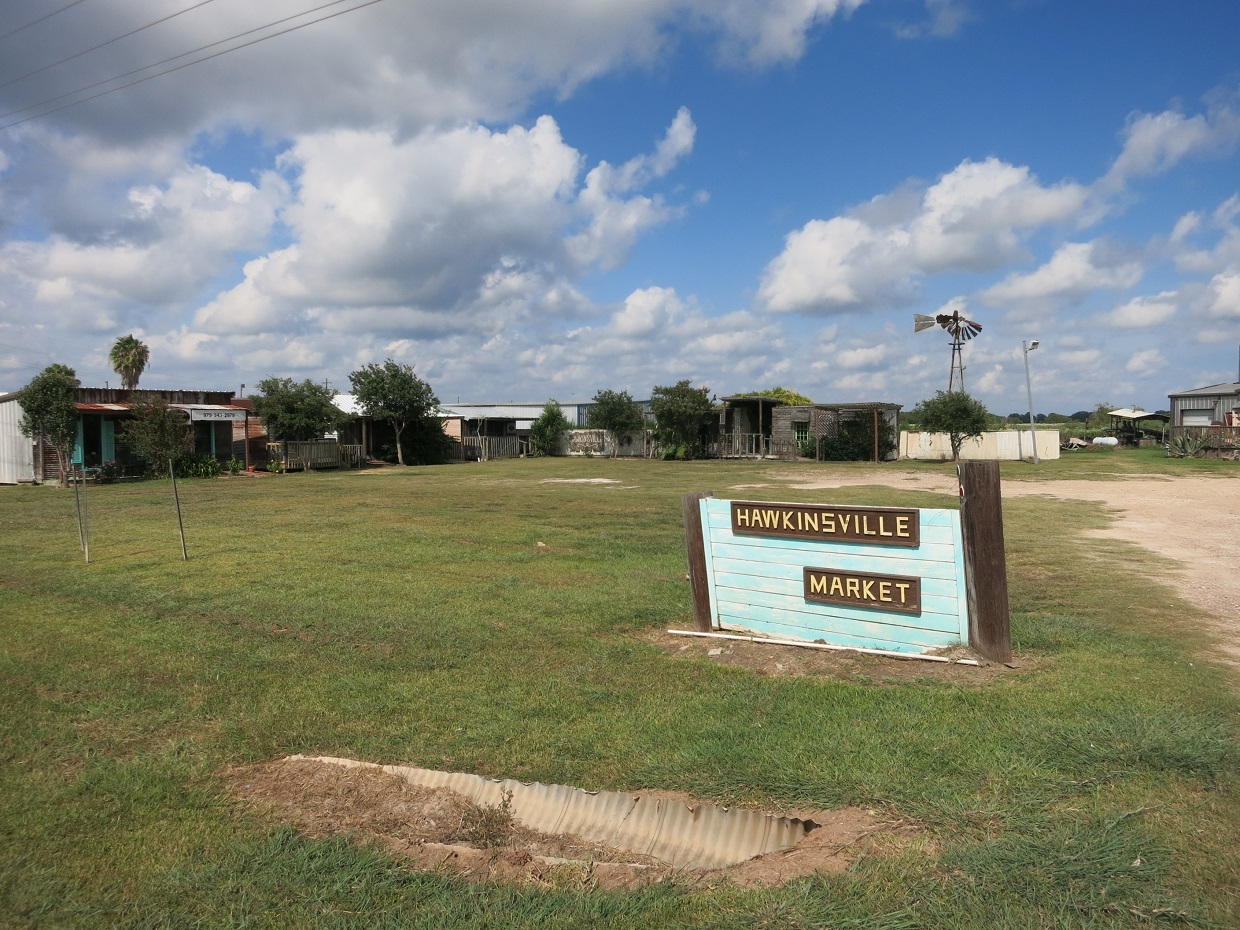
Hawkinsville Market sign is at the intersection of FM 457 and FM 2611 farther south.

== History ==
The town was named in honor of James Boyd Hawkins, a planter from North Carolina who established the Hawkins Ranch, a cotton and sugarcane plantation, later a cattle ranch, in Matagorda County.

== Education ==
Van Vleck Independent School District operates schools in the area.

The designated community college for Van Vleck ISD is Wharton County Junior College.

== See also ==
- List of unincorporated communities in Texas

== Additional reading ==
- Lewis, Frank Hawkins (February 1979). "Evolution of an Early Texas Ranch". Rangelands. 1 (1): 6–8. JSTOR 3900331.
- Jenkins, Rachel: Hawkinsville, Texas from the Handbook of Texas Online (August 31, 2010). Retrieved August 7, 2018.
- Troesser, John; Troesser, Kate Wong (2009). "HAWKINSVILLE, TEXAS". Texas Escapes.
