= Van Vleck =

Van Vleck may refer to:

== People ==
- John Monroe Van Vleck (1833–1912), American mathematician and astronomer
- Edward Burr Van Vleck (1863–1943), American mathematician
- John Hasbrouck Van Vleck (1899–1980), American physicist and mathematician
- Tom Van Vleck, American software engineer
- Natalie Van Vleck (1901–1981), American artist and conservationist

== Places ==
- Van Vleck, Texas, a census-designated place
- Van Vleck House, a historic house in New York
- Van Vleck Observatory, Connecticut (IAU code 298)
- Van Vleck (crater), a lunar impact crater
- Van Vleck House and Barn, a historic house in Wyoming
- Van Vleck House and Gardens, a former private estate in New Jersey
- Van Vleck Independent School District, a public school district in Texas
  - Van Vleck High School, a public high school in Texas
- Howard Van Vleck Arboretum, an arboretum at the Montclair Art Museum

== See also ==
- Van Vleck paramagnetism
- Starrett & van Vleck, American architectural firm
