= Eric Martin (wide receiver) =

American football player (born 1961)

No. 84, 85
- Position: Wide receiver

Personal information
- Born: November 8, 1961 (age 64); Van Vleck, Texas, U.S.
- Listed height: 6 ft 1 in (1.85 m)
- Listed weight: 207 lb (94 kg)

Career information
- High school: Van Vleck
- College: LSU
- NFL draft: 1985: 7th round, 179th overall pick

Career history
- New Orleans Saints (1985–1993); Kansas City Chiefs (1994)

Awards and highlights
- Pro Bowl (1988); New Orleans Saints Hall of Fame; First-team All-American (1983); 2× First-team All-SEC (1983, 1984)

Career NFL statistics
- Receptions: 553
- Receiving yards: 8,161
- Receiving touchdowns: 49
- Stats at Pro Football Reference

Eric Wayne Martin (born November 8, 1961) is an American former professional football player who was a wide receiver in the National Football League (NFL). He played college football for the LSU Tigers from 1981 to 1984 and professionally for the New Orleans Saints from 1985 to 1993 and the Kansas City Chiefs in 1994.

== Early life ==
Martin was born and raised in Van Vleck, Texas and played scholastically at Van Vleck High School.

== College career ==
In 1981, Martin went to Louisiana State University (LSU). Martin was originally signed as a running back, but was moved to wide receiver early in his collegiate career. As a wide receiver for LSU's football team, Martin had 2,625 yards receiving, which at the time was the most career passing yards caught by any receiver in Southeastern Conference (SEC) history. Martin's best season came during his junior year in 1983 when he had 1,064 receiving, which at the time was the 3rd best single-season performance in SEC history. That year, Martin became the first wide receiver in LSU history to be awarded All-American honors. He was also selected to the first-team of the All-SEC Team, becoming the first LSU wide receiver to achieve that feat since Andy Hamilton (first-team All-SEC Team, 1971). As a senior, Martin was again selected to the first-team of the All-SEC Team, becoming the first LSU wide receiver in history to be named twice to the first-team All-SEC Team.

At LSU, Martin's biggest games were No. 12 LSU's 55–21 victory over No. 7 Florida State in 1982 (3 receptions for 121 yards) and LSU's 40–14 victory over No. 9 Washington in 1983 (7 receptions for 137 yards). Martin finished his career at LSU with ten 100-yard-receiving games, including four as a sophomore in 1982 and four as a junior in 1983.

== Professional career ==
Martin was taken in the seventh round of the 1985 NFL draft by the New Orleans Saints. He was the 27th wide receiver taken that year.

Martin played in 10 NFL seasons, from 1985 to 1994. In 1987, he helped lead the Saints to their first playoff appearance in franchise history, only to lose to the Minnesota Vikings 44–10 in the NFC Wildcard. The following year, Martin was a Pro Bowl selection, catching 85 receptions for 1,083 yards and seven touchdowns. After playing 9 years with the Saints, he spent the last year of his career with the Kansas City Chiefs.

Martin is among the Saints franchise leaders in several statistical categories. He ranks third in receptions with 532 behind Marques Colston and Michael Thomas, fourth behind Joe Horn, Jimmy Graham, and Marques Colston in receiving touchdowns with 48, and second behind Marques Colston in receiving yards with 7,854. He ranks fourth behind Marques Colston Joe Horn and Michael Thomas with most 100-yard receiving games with 18.

== NFL career statistics ==
Legend
	Led the league
**Bold**	Career high

=== Regular season ===
Year	Team	Games		Receiving				
Year	Team	GP	GS	Rec	Yds	Avg	Lng	TD
1985	NO	16	12	35	522	14.9	50	4
1986	NO	16	11	37	675	**18.2**	**84**	5
1987	NO	15	11	44	778	17.7	67	7
1988	NO	16	16	**85**	1,083	12.7	40	7
1989	NO	16	15	68	**1,090**	16.0	53	**8**
1990	NO	16	16	63	912	14.5	58	5
1991	NO	16	13	66	803	12.2	30	4
1992	NO	16	11	68	1,041	15.3	52	5
1993	NO	16	13	66	950	14.4	54	3
1994	KC	10	1	21	307	14.6	61	1
Career		153	119	553	8,161	14.8	84	49
