= Cedar Lake, Texas =

Unincorporated community in Texas, US

Coordinates: 28°54′04″N 95°38′13″W

Cedar Lake is an unincorporated community in Matagorda County, Texas, United States.

== Education ==
Van Vleck Independent School District operates schools in the area.

The designated community college for Van Vleck ISD is Wharton County Junior College.

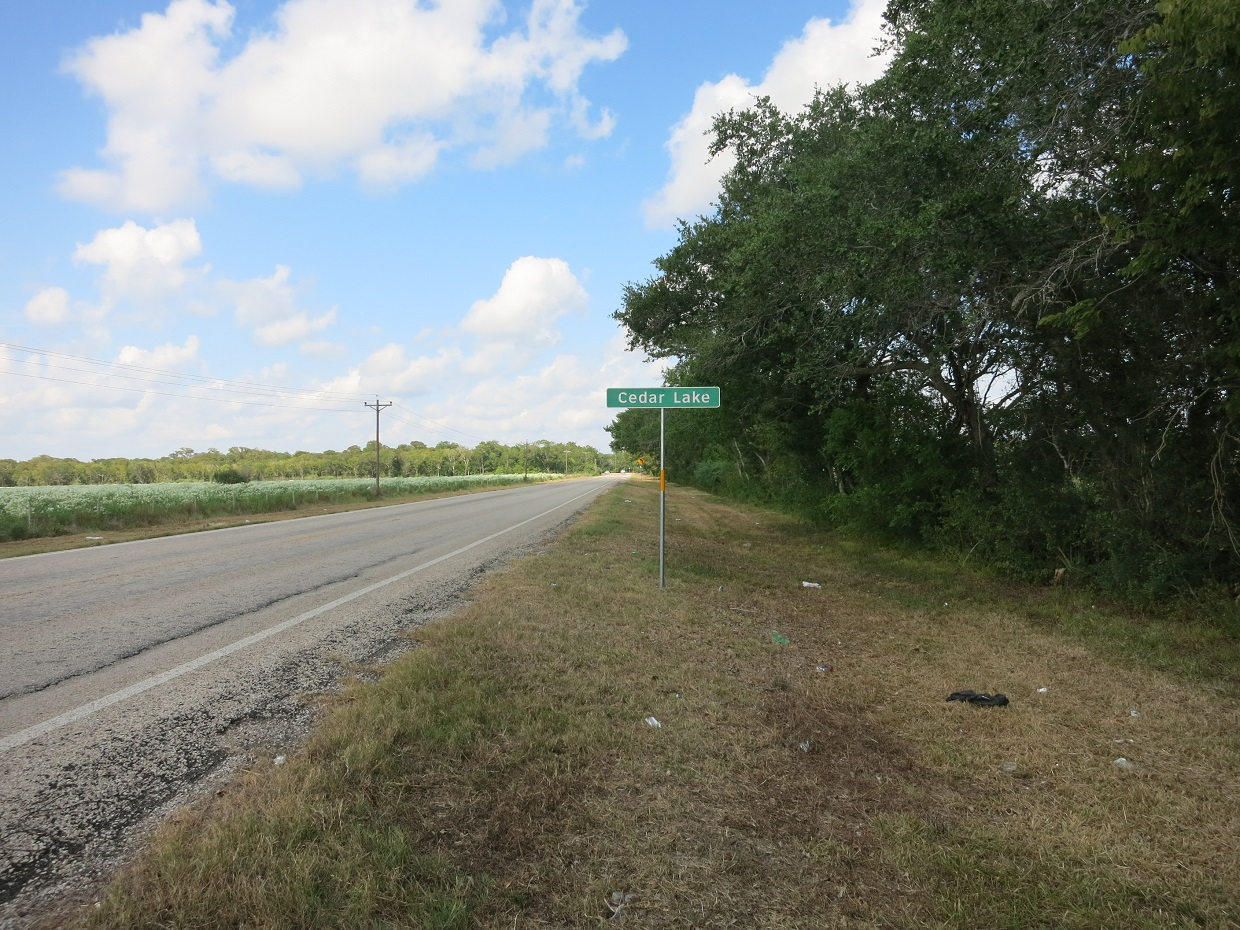
Cedar Lake sign along FM 2611 looking northeast

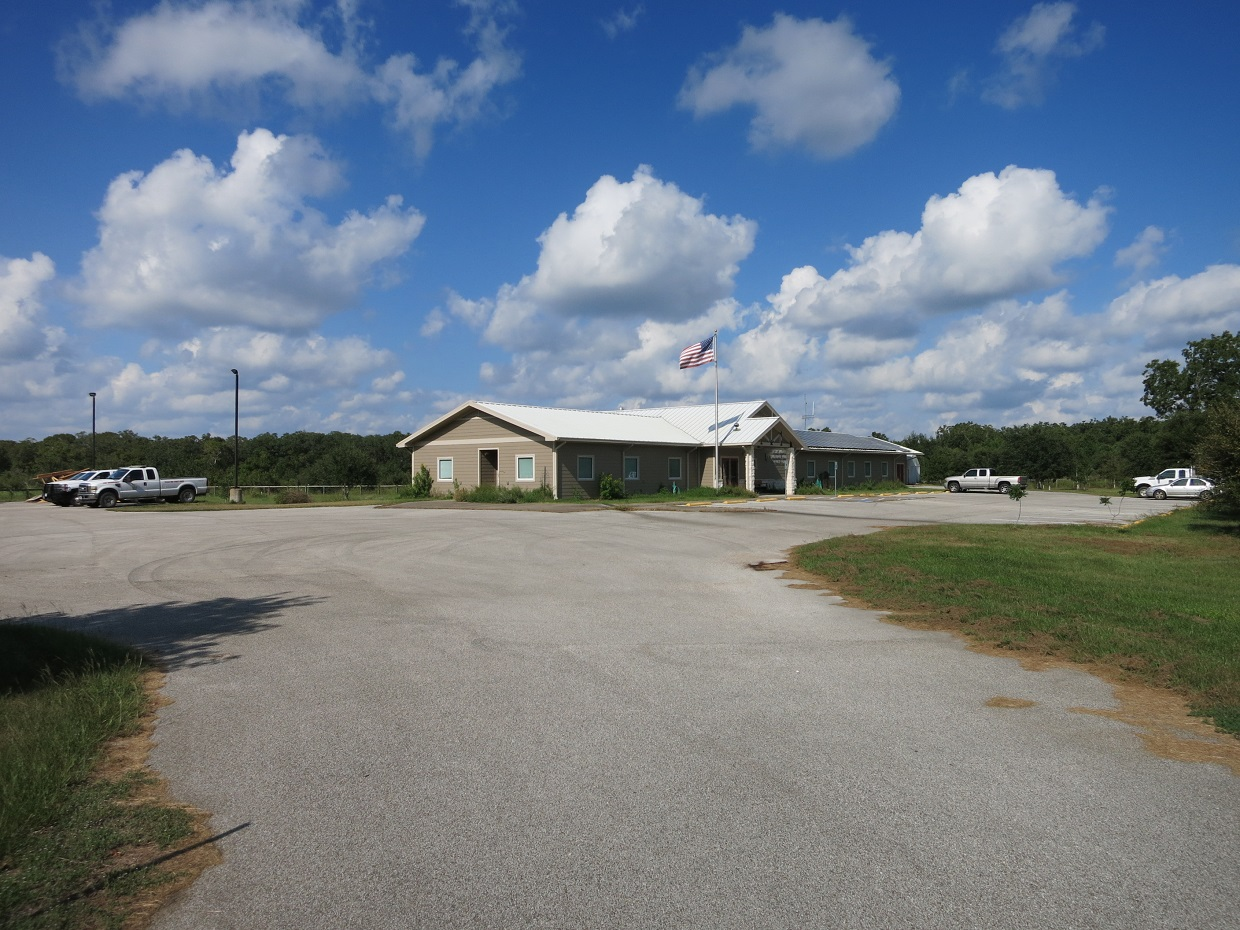
MidCoast National Wildlife Refuge, FM 2611 & Co 316

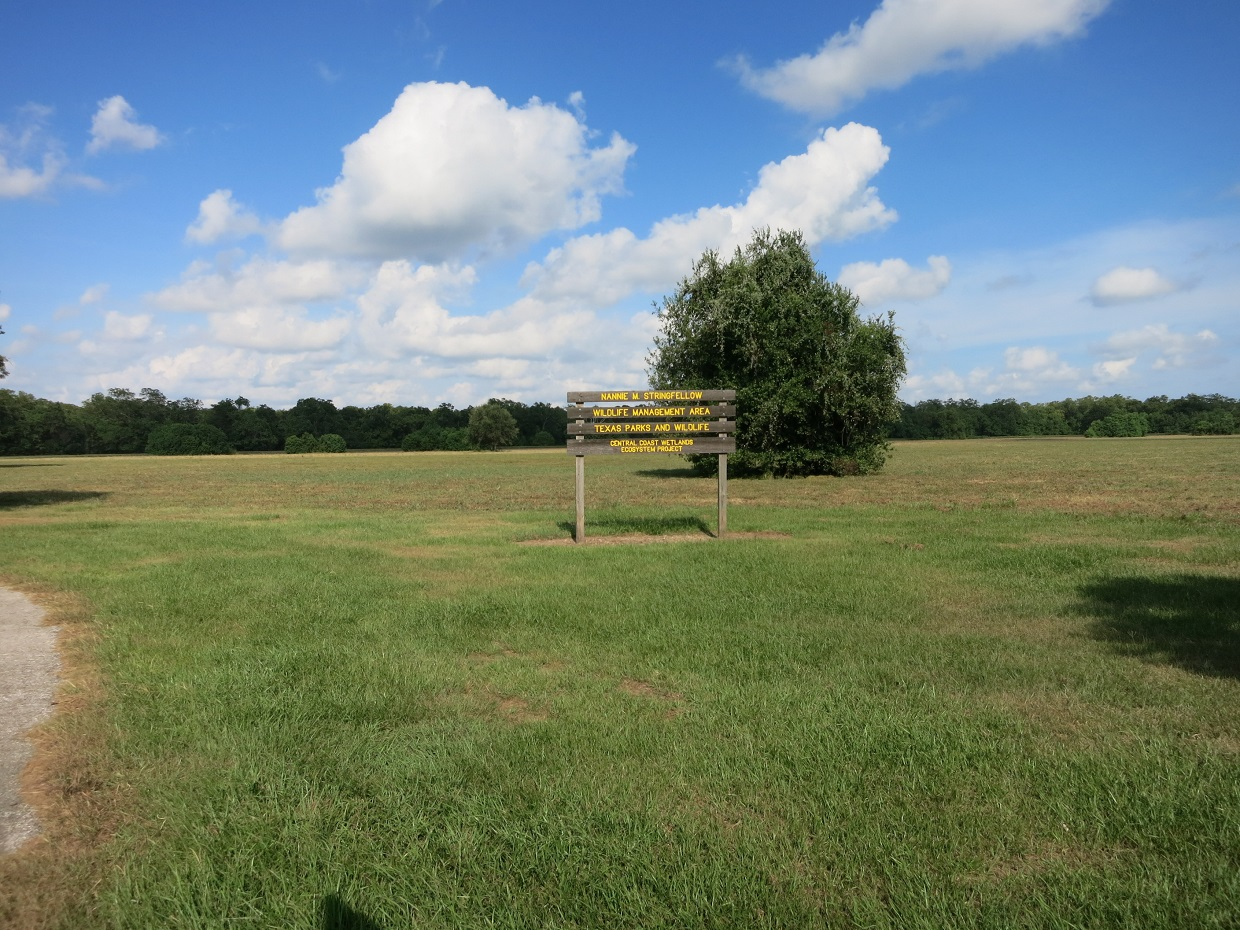
Nannie M. Stringfellow Wildlife Management Area
