= Caney, Texas =

Caney can refer to the following places in the United States:

- Caney, Matagorda County, Texas
- New Caney, Texas
