= Matagorda, Texas =

Matagorda
- Town
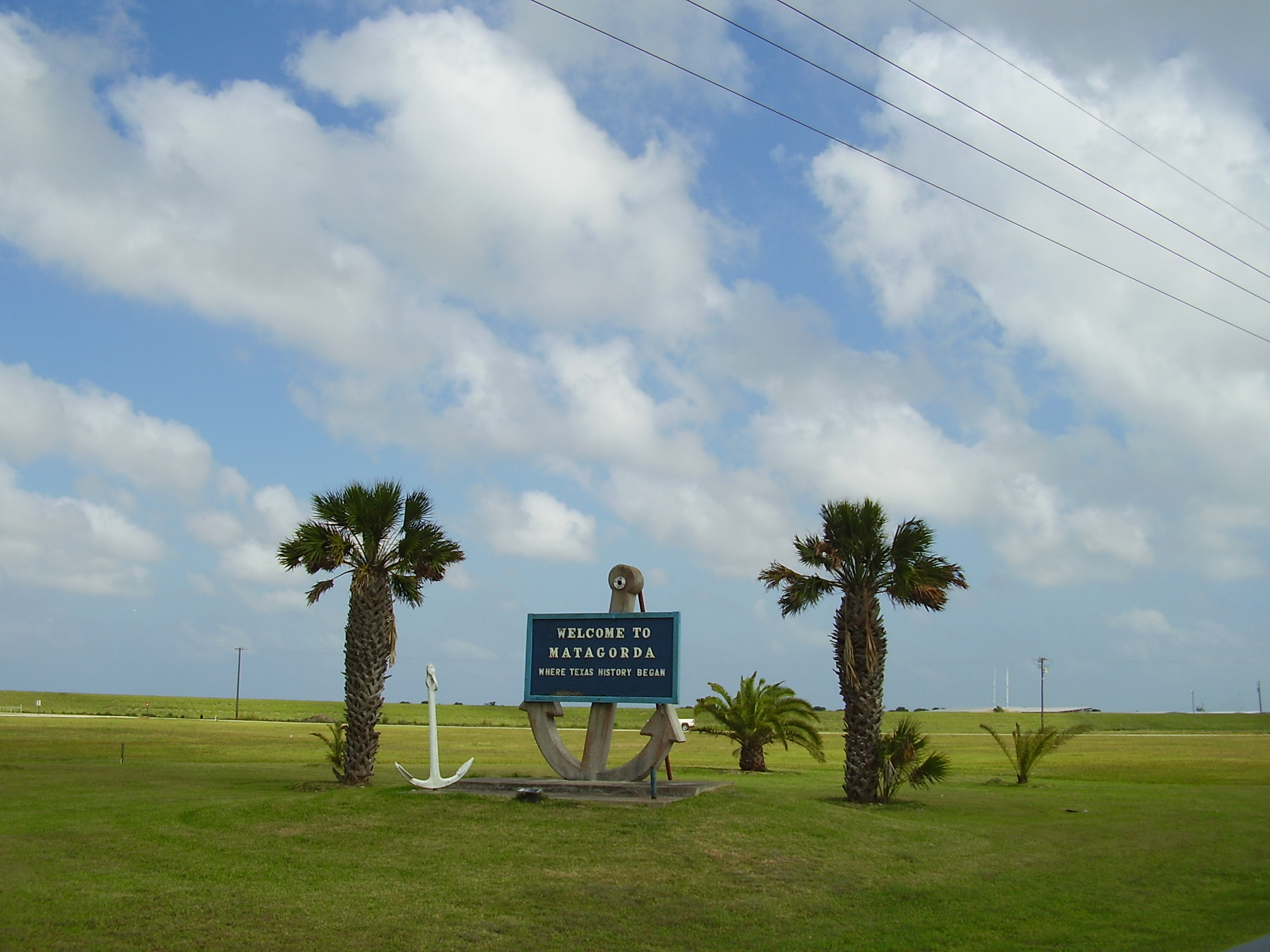
- Sign indicating Matagorda

- Location within Texas
- Coordinates: 28°41′49″N 95°58′00″W
- Country: United States
- State: Texas
- County: Matagorda
- Elevation: 7 ft (2.1 m)

Population
  - Total: 313
- Time zone: UTC-6 (Central Time Zone)
- GNIS feature ID: 2586960

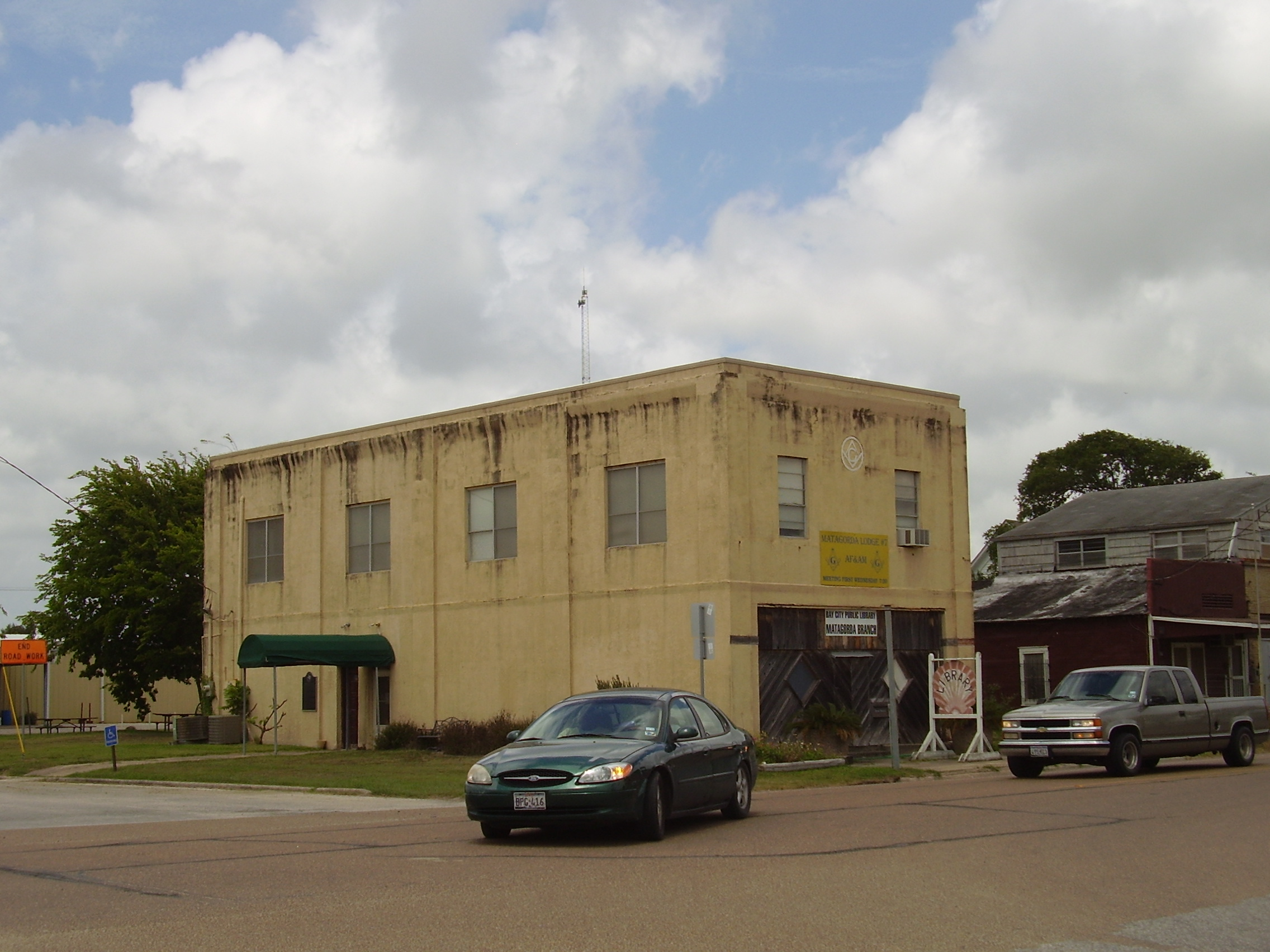
Bay City Public Library Matagorda Branch

Matagorda (/ˈmætəˈɡɔːrdə/) is a census-designated place in Matagorda County, Texas, United States. It is located near the mouth of the Colorado River on the upper Texas Gulf Coast in the United States. In 2020, its population was 313. Matagorda is primarily a tourist town, with commercial and recreational fishing being the top industries. About 23 miles (37 km) of the beach are accessible by vehicle and 35 additional miles are accessible only by boat. Matagorda is at the end of State Highway 60 and the beginning of Farm to Market Road 2031, which runs over the Intracoastal Waterway and south to the Gulf of Mexico.

== History ==
Matagorda is the third-oldest Anglo-American town in Texas. It was established in 1827 when Stephen F. Austin obtained permission from the Mexican government to build a town to protect incoming settlers. Elias R. Wightman, one of Austin's early surveyors, traveled to Matagorda in 1829 with 60 immigrant settlers. On August 1, 1829, Wightman, Hosea H. League, James E. B. Austin, and partners Thomas M. Duke and William Selkirk met and elected town officers. In 1830, Matagorda was incorporated.

In 1837, Matagorda served as the county seat of Matagorda County. After the Texas Revolution, the town became a shipping port and social center. Theaters and hotels were in operation by 1838.

The township of Matagorda has 24 historical markers. Matagorda was named by early Spanish settlers after the dense foliage that grew near the coast. Mata gorda means "fat thicket" in Spanish

== Demographics ==
Historical population
Census	Pop.	Note	%±
2010	503		—
2020	313		−37.8%
U.S. Decennial Census; 1850–1900 1910; 1920 1930 1940; 1950 1960 1970; 1980 1990 2000; 2010 2020

Matagorda first appeared as a census-designated place in the 2010 U.S. census.

Matagorda CDP, Texas – Racial and ethnic composition Note: the US Census treats Hispanic/Latino as an ethnic category. This table excludes Latinos from the racial categories and assigns them to a separate category. Hispanics/Latinos may be of any race.
Race / Ethnicity (NH = Non-Hispanic)	Pop 2010	Pop 2020	% 2010	% 2020
White alone (NH)	426	276	84.69%	88.18%
Black or African American alone (NH)	4	5	0.80%	1.60%
Native American or Alaska Native alone (NH)	3	0	0.60%	0.00%
Native Hawaiian or Pacific Islander alone (NH)	1	0	0.20%	0.00%
Mixed race or Multiracial (NH)	4	9	0.80%	2.88%
Hispanic or Latino (any race)	65	23	12.92%	7.35%
Total	503	313	100.00%	100.00%

As of the 2020 United States census, 313 people, 242 households, and 167 families were residing in the CDP.

== Characteristics ==
Matagorda's beach area has access to both East and West Matagorda Bays, Matagorda Beach, and the Gulf of Mexico.

Since 1997, 234 different species of birds have been spotted by the North American Audubon Christmas Bird Count. Among the species reported are the prairie warbler, common poorwill, broad-winged hawk, MacGillivray's warbler, and Swainson's warbler.

== Education ==
Matagorda has had several schools in town, including the Matagorda Academy, which was established in 1839. Other schools in town were the Lafayette Academy and a "Young Ladies School". In 1854, after the Texas Education Act was implemented, Matagorda County was divided into six school districts, with the first public schools open in Matagorda. The CDP is currently served by the Matagorda Independent School District and serves students from prekindergarten through 12th grade.

The designated community college for Matagorda Independent School District is Wharton County Junior College.
