= Markham, Texas =

- CDP
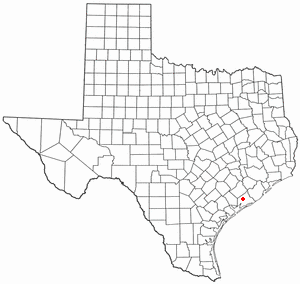
- Location of Markham, Texas

- Coordinates: 28°57′46″N 96°03′52″W
- Country: United States
- State: Texas
- County: Matagorda

Area
  - Total: 2.3 sq mi (5.9 km^{2})
  - Land: 2.3 sq mi (5.9 km^{2})
  - Water: 0 sq mi (0.0 km^{2})
- Elevation: 52 ft (16 m)

Population (2020)
  - Total: 908
  - Density: 400/sq mi (150/km^{2})
- Time zone: UTC-6 (Central (CST))
  - Summer (DST): UTC-5 (CDT)
- ZIP code: 77456
- Area code: 979
- FIPS code: 48-46716
- GNIS feature ID: 2408182

Markham is a census-designated place (CDP) in Matagorda County, Texas, United States. Named in 1903 for Charles H. Markham, a railroad engineer for Southern Pacific (and later President of the Illinois Central Railroad), the town was founded in 1901 as Cortes. In 1914, it was a designated stop on the Texas and New Orleans Railroad. As of the 2020 census, the population was 908.

== Geography ==
According to the United States Census Bureau, the CDP has a total area of 2.3 square miles (6.0 km^{2}), all land. Markham lies southwest, approximately 90 miles or 1 1/2-hour drive to downtown Houston.

== Demographics ==
Historical population
Census	Pop.	Note	%±
1980	1,554		—
1990	1,206		−22.4%
2000	1,138		−5.6%
2010	1,082		−4.9%
2020	908		−16.1%
U.S. Decennial Census; 1850–1900 1910; 1920 1930 1940; 1950 1960 1970; 1980 1990 2000; 2010 2020

Markham was first listed as a census designated place in the 1980 United States census.

=== 2020 census ===
Markham CDP, Texas – Racial and ethnic composition Note: the US Census treats Hispanic/Latino as an ethnic category. This table excludes Latinos from the racial categories and assigns them to a separate category. Hispanics/Latinos may be of any race.
Race / Ethnicity (NH = Non-Hispanic)	Pop 2000	Pop 2010	Pop 2020	% 2000	% 2010	% 2020
White alone (NH)	605	548	459	53.16%	50.65%	50.55%
Black or African American alone (NH)	113	130	63	9.93%	12.01%	6.94%
Native American or Alaska Native alone (NH)	0	2	4	0.00%	0.18%	0.44%
Asian alone (NH)	1	0	0	0.09%	0.00%	0.00%
Native Hawaiian or Pacific Islander alone (NH)	0	1	0	0.00%	0.09%	0.00%
Other race alone (NH)	0	0	5	0.00%	0.00%	0.55%
Mixed race or Multiracial (NH)	9	23	33	0.79%	2.13%	3.63%
Hispanic or Latino (any race)	410	378	344	36.03%	34.94%	37.89%
Total	1,138	1,082	908	100.00%	100.00%	100.00%

=== 2000 census ===
As of the census of 2000, there were 1,138 people, 386 households, and 306 families residing in the CDP. The population density was 497.5 inhabitants per square mile (192.1/km^{2}). There were 446 housing units at an average density of 195.0 per square mile (75.3/km^{2}). The racial makeup of the CDP was 79.88% White, 9.93% African American, 0.09% Native American, 0.09% Asian, 7.91% from other races, and 2.11% from two or more races. Hispanic or Latino of any race were 36.03% of the population.

There were 386 households, out of which 39.9% had children under the age of 18 living with them, 61.7% were married couples living together, 11.9% had a female householder with no husband present, and 20.7% were non-families. 17.9% of all households were made up of individuals, and 7.0% had someone living alone who was 65 years of age or older. The average household size was 2.95 and the average family size was 3.35.

In the CDP, the population was spread out, with 31.5% under the age of 18, 8.3% from 18 to 24, 27.4% from 25 to 44, 22.1% from 45 to 64, and 10.7% who were 65 years of age or older. The median age was 33 years. For every 100 females, there were 96.2 males. For every 100 females age 18 and over, there were 90.9 males.

The median income for a household in the CDP was $41,900, and the median income for a family was $49,792. Males had a median income of $32,391 versus $20,938 for females. The per capita income for the CDP was $17,302. About 7.6% of families and 11.4% of the population were below the poverty line, including 15.3% of those under age 18 and 19.7% of those age 65 or over.

== Education ==
Markham is served by the Tidehaven Independent School District.

The designated community college for Tidehaven ISD is Wharton County Junior College.
