= Cedar Lane, Texas =

Unincorporated community in Texas, US

Coordinates: 28°56′19″N 95°44′12″W

Cedar Lane is an unincorporated community in Matagorda County, Texas, United States.

== History ==
The community back then was utilized as a stop on the Texas and New Orleans Railroad. In 1912, the community managed to establish its own post office, and by 1914, a connection to telephone services. In 1936, the community had additional amenities such as a church, two businesses, 16 dwellings, a paved road, and a school district which then was consolidated into the Van Vleck Independent School District.

== Education ==
Van Vleck Independent School District operates schools in the area.

The designated community college for Van Vleck ISD is Wharton County Junior College.

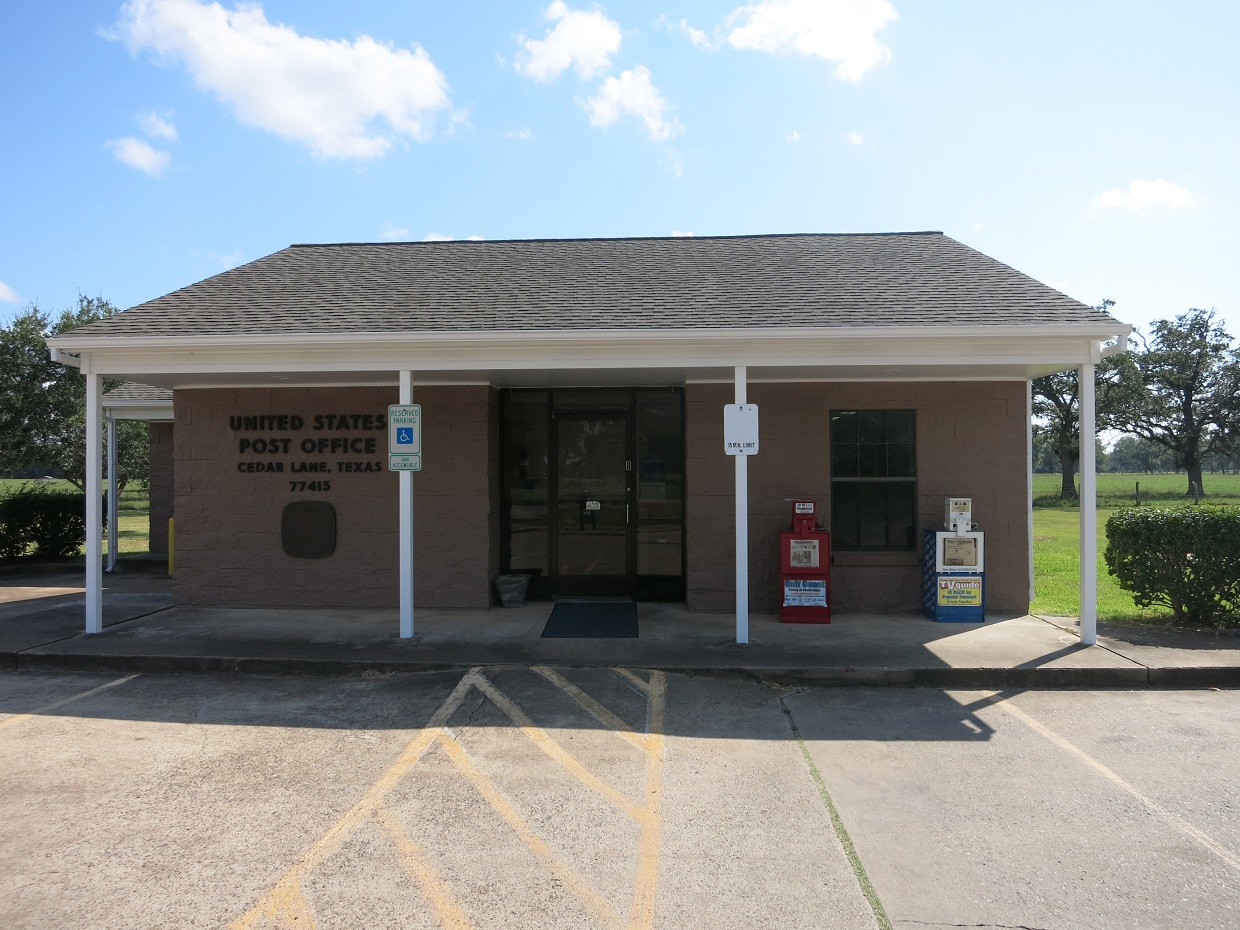
US Post Office on FM 457

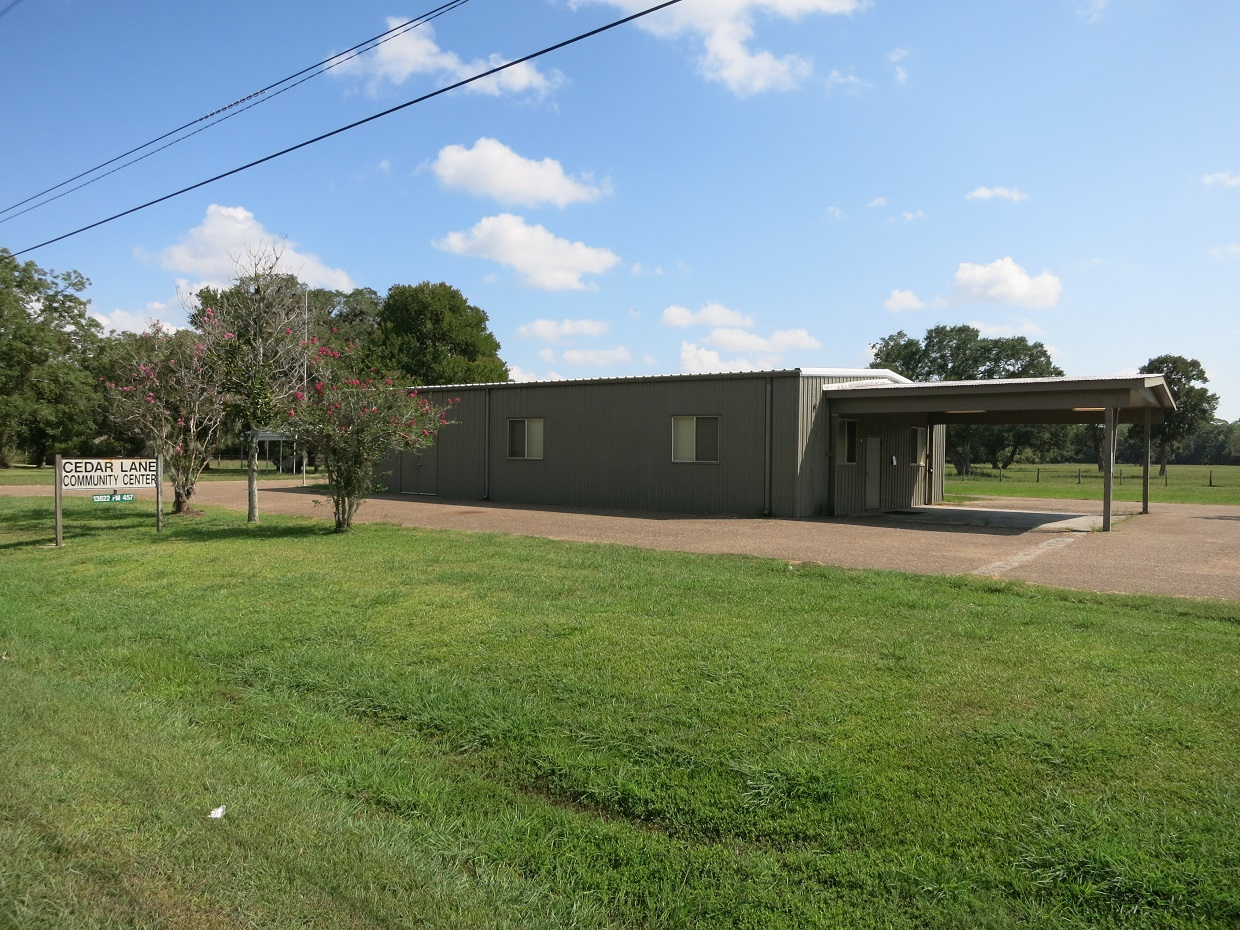
Cedar Lane Community Center

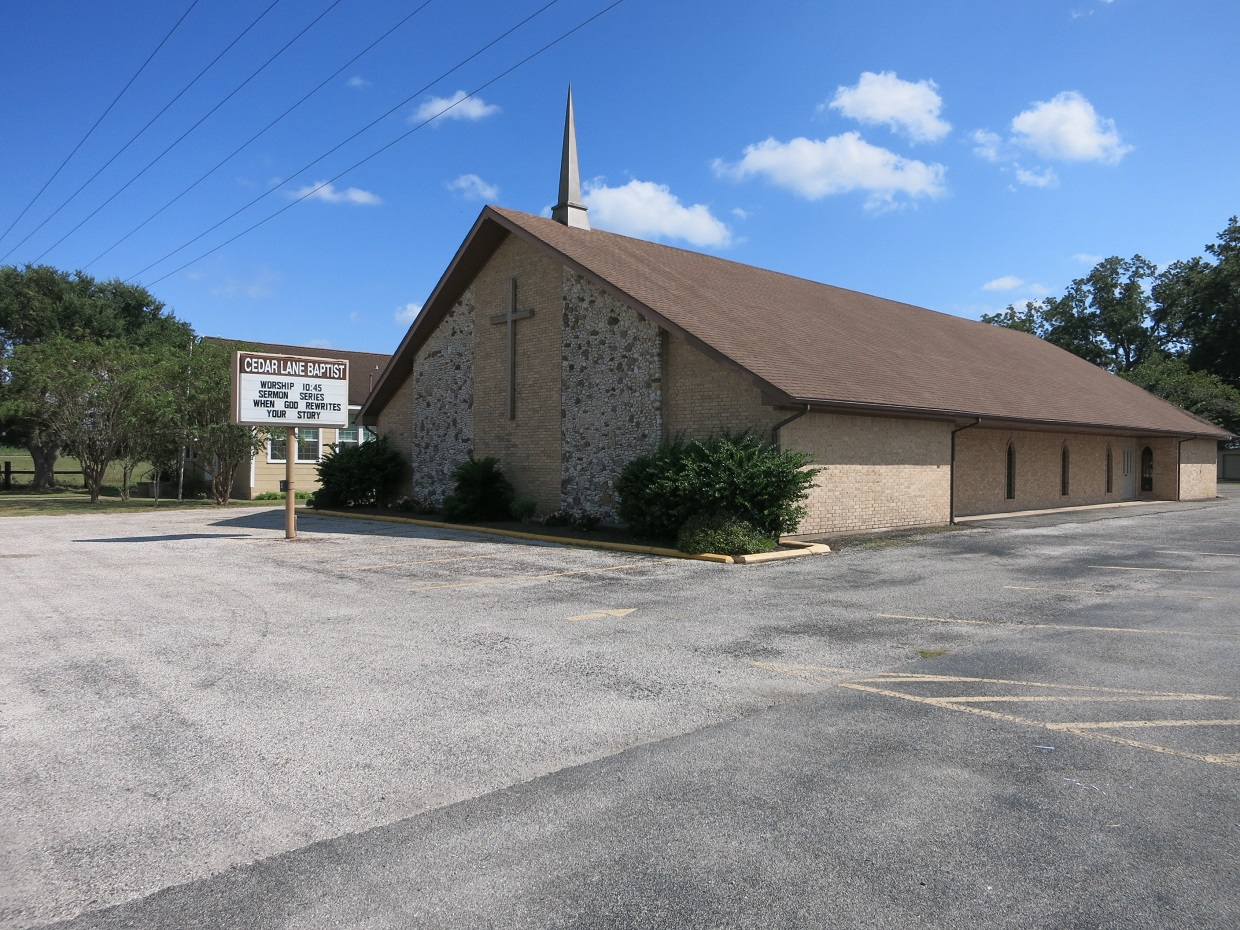
Cedar Lane Baptist Church

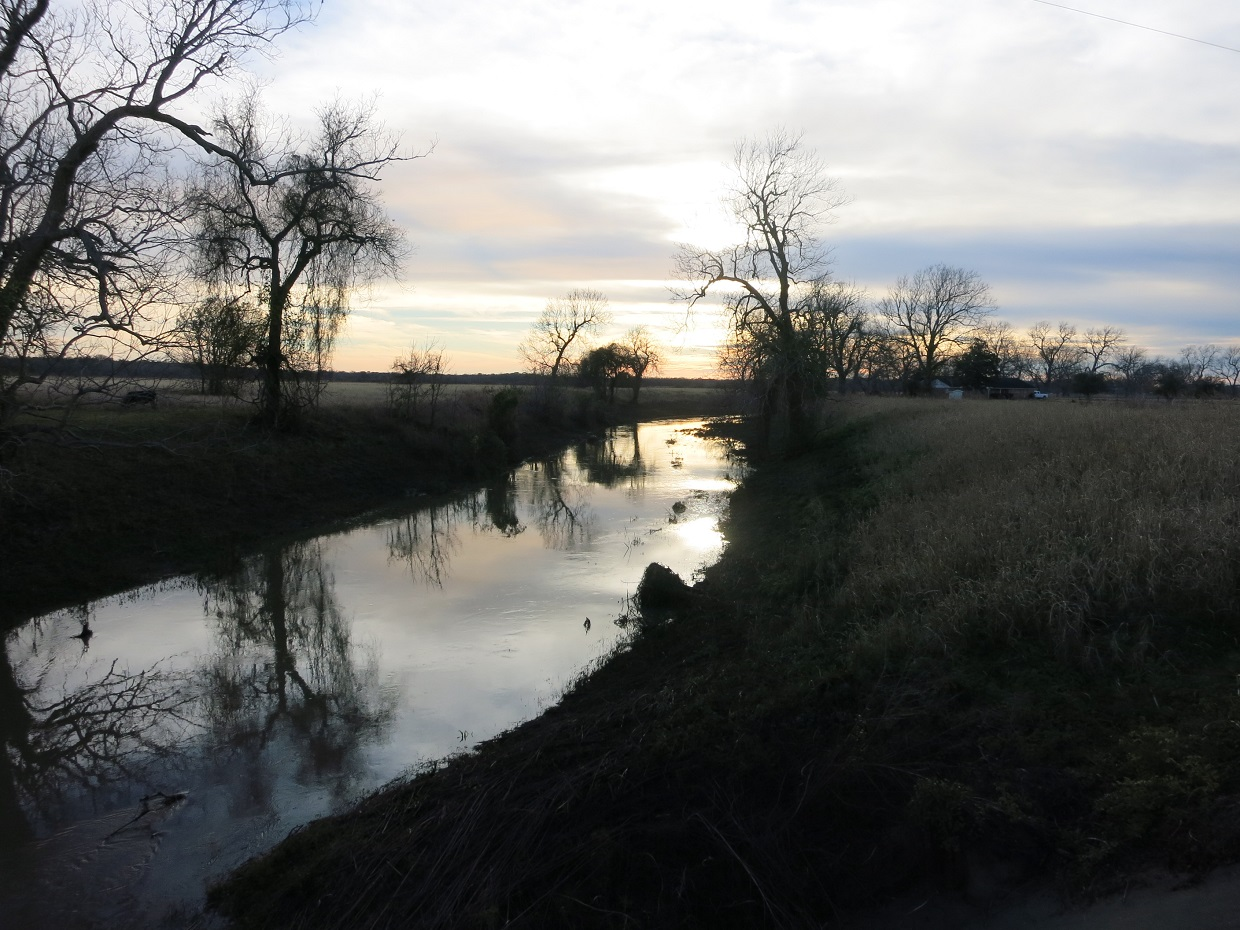
Caney Creek at the FM 457 bridge at sunset
