= Allenhurst, Texas =

Allenhurst
- Unincorporated community
- Location within Texas
- Coordinates: 29°00′34″N 95°50′41″W
- Country: United States
- County: Matagorda
- Elevation: 39 ft (12 m)
- GNIS feature ID: 1379333

Allenhurst is an unincorporated community in Matagorda County, Texas, United States.

== Education ==
Van Vleck Independent School District operates schools in the area.
