= Elmaton, Texas =

Unincorporated community in Texas, US

Coordinates: 28°53′11″N 96°08′24″W

El Maton is an unincorporated community in Matagorda County, Texas, United States.

The community is in the areas of Farm to Market Road 1095, 459, and State Highway 35, along the Union Pacific Railroad.

The Tidehaven Independent School District serves area students.

The designated community college for Tidehaven ISD is Wharton County Junior College.
