= Caney, Matagorda County, Texas =

Unincorporated community in Texas, US

Coordinates: 28°57′49″N 95°51′17″W

Caney is an unincorporated community in Matagorda County, Texas, United States.

== Education ==
Van Vleck Independent School District operates schools in the area.

The designated community college for Van Vleck ISD is Wharton County Junior College.

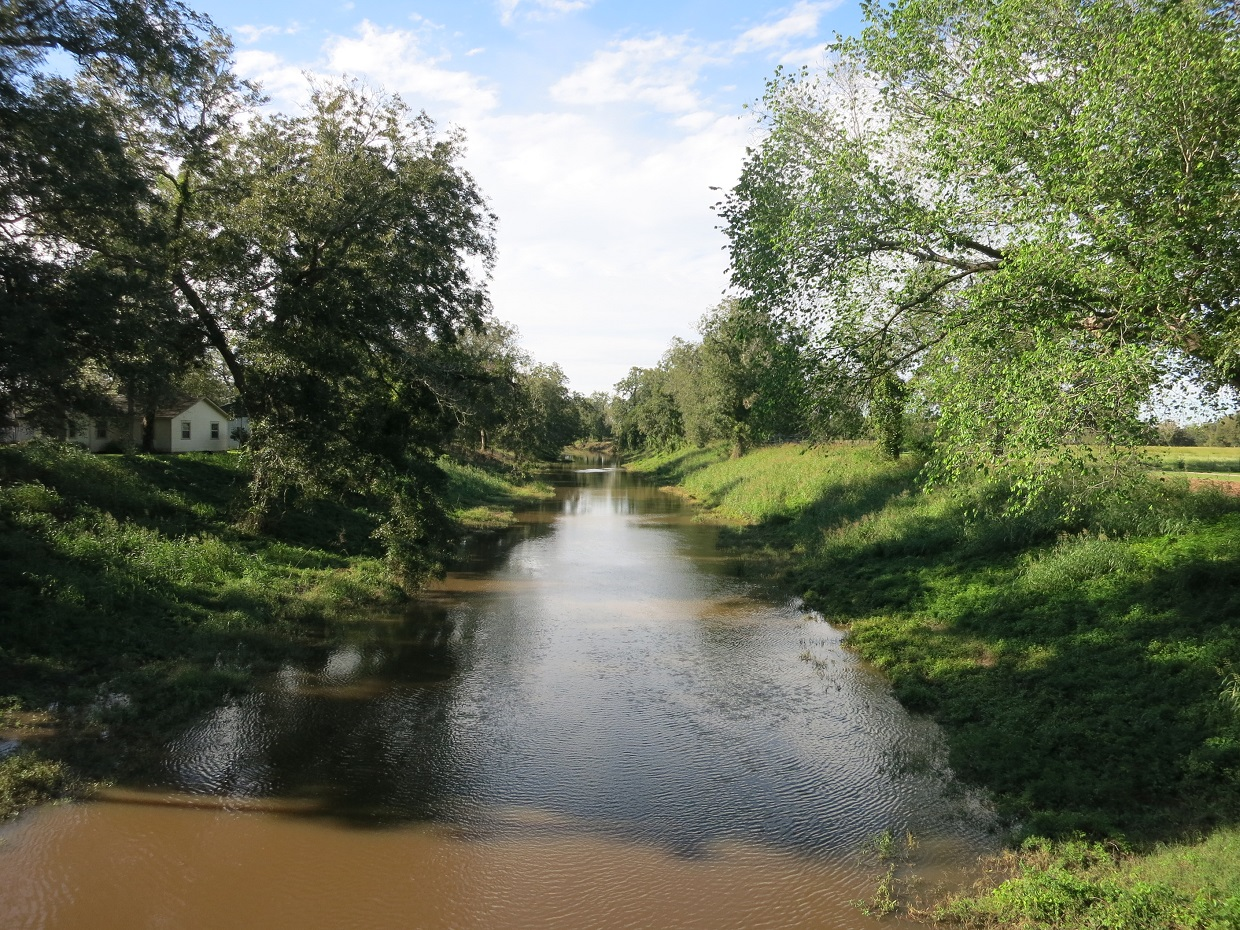
Caney Creek looking north at the FM 457 bridge

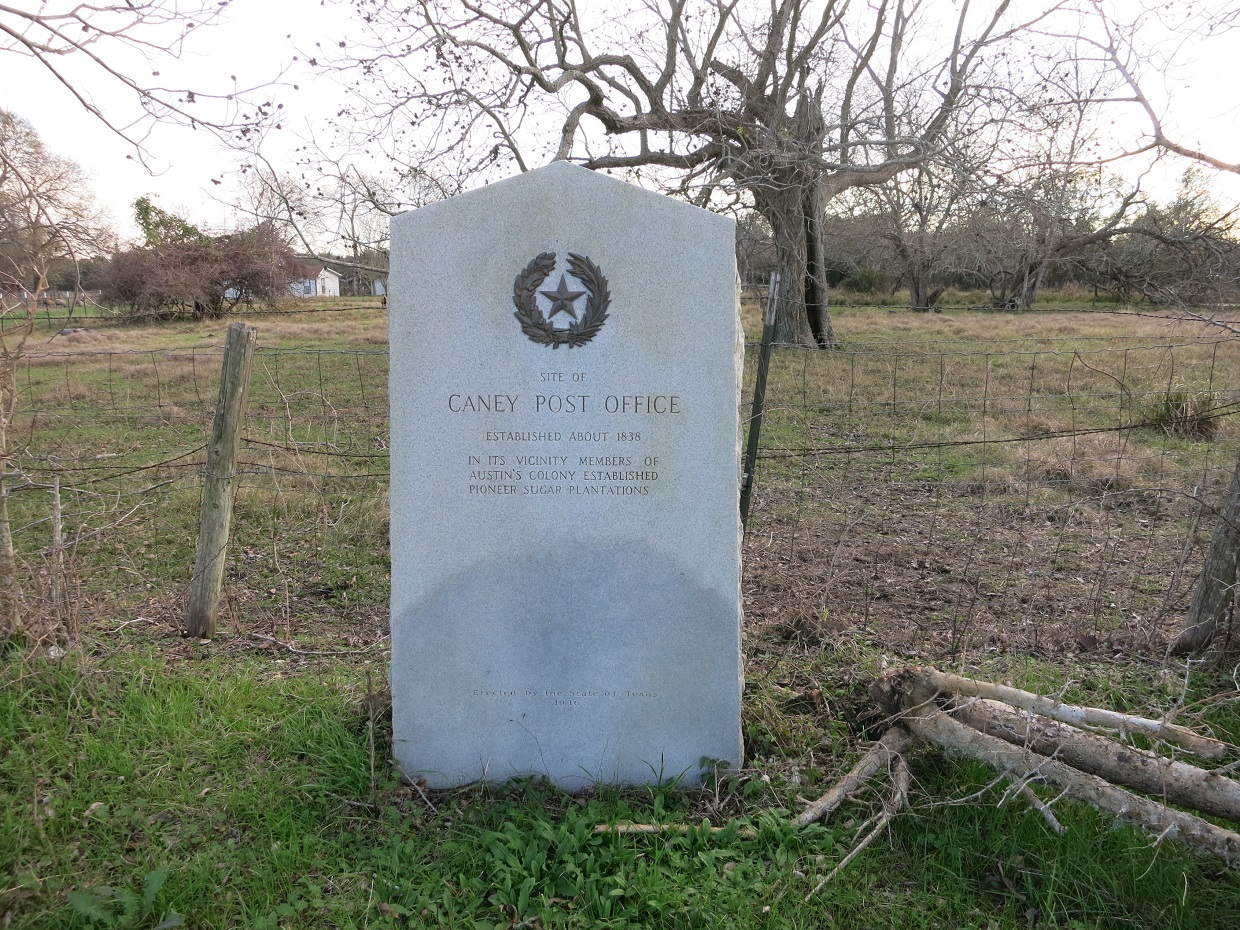
Caney Post Office state historical marker on FM 457
