= Palacios Independent School District =

School district in Texas, United States

Address
- 1209 12th Street Palacios, Texas, 77467; United States

District information
- Grades: PK–12
- Schools: 3
- NCES District ID: 4834020

Students and staff
- Students: 1,267 (2023–2024)
- Teachers: 103.11 (on an FTE basis)
- Student–teacher ratio: 12.28:1

Other information
- Website: www.palaciosisd.org

Palacios Independent School District is a public school district based in Palacios, Texas (USA). The district is located south of Bay City, Texas.

Located in southwestern Matagorda County, a small portion of the district extends into southeastern Jackson County. The District covers 718 square miles(1859Km). The district serves Palacios and several unincorporated areas, including Collegeport in Matagorda County.

PISD's rival is Tidehaven Independent School District.

In 2009, the school district was rated "recognized" by the Texas Education Agency.

== Schools ==
- Palacios High School (Grades 9-12)
  - Palacios High School has been awarded the bronze medal by US News's America's Best High Schools, US News.
- Palacios Junior High (Grades 6-8)
- East Side Intermediate (Grades 4-5)
  - 2008-2010 Exemplary Campus
  - 1989-90 National Blue Ribbon School
- Central Elementary (Grades PK-3)
