= Van Vleck High School =

Location
- 133 S. Fourth Street; Van Vleck, Texas 77482; United States; 29.01696°N 95.88757°W

Information
- School type: Public high school
- School district: Van Vleck Independent School District
- Principal: Shannon Garcia
- Staff: 30.53 (FTE)
- Grades: 9-12
- Enrollment: 337 (2023–2024)
- Student to teacher ratio: 11.04
- Colors: Orange & Black
- Athletics conference: UIL Class 3A
- Mascot: Leopard
- Website: high-school.vvisd.org

Van Vleck High School is a public high school located in the city of Van Vleck, Texas, in Matagorda County, United States and classified as a 3A school by the UIL. It is a part of the Van Vleck Independent School District located in northeast Matagorda County. In 2013, the school was rated "Met Standard" by the Texas Education Agency.

== Athletics ==
The Van Vleck Leopards compete in these sports -

Volleyball, Cross Country, Football, Basketball, Powerlifting, Golf, Tennis, Track, Baseball & Softball

=== State Finalist ===
- Football
  - 1980(3A)
- Basketball
  - 1975(2A)

2000 (2A)

== Notable alumni ==
- Charles Austin - (born December 19, 1967) is an American athlete who won the gold medal in the men's high jump at the 1996 Summer Olympics in Atlanta.
