= Collegeport, Texas =

- unincorporated community
- Location of Collegeport in Texas Collegeport, Texas (the United States)
- Coordinates: 28°43′31″N 96°10′30″W
- Country: United States
- State: Texas
- County: Matagorda
- Founded: 1908
- Elevation: 10 ft (3.0 m)
- Time zone: UTC-6 (Central (CST))
  - Summer (DST): UTC-5 (CDT)
- Zip code: 77428
- Area code: 361
- FIPS code: 48-48321
- GNIS feature ID: 1379577

Collegeport is an unincorporated community in Matagorda County, Texas, United States.

Founded on May 25, 1908, Collegeport is located on Tres Palacios Bay, which outlets into Matagorda Bay. Despite the community's name, there is no college in Collegeport, although the Texas State Technical College Marine Education Center is located across Tres Palacios Bay in Palacios, a 25-minute drive away.

== History ==
=== Early days ===
Collegeport was acquired through a 9,000-acre (36 km^{2}) land purchase in 1908. Ranchers Jonathan Edward Pierce and Abel Brown Pierce sold their land to developer Burton D. Hurd. In the agreement Hurd would develop a town that would include a college and a port on the Trespalacios Bay.

Families began relocating to Collegeport, also called the "Town of Opportunity", after an advertising venture by Hurd that promoted the area's mild climate and the prospective farming lands.

=== Growth ===
A year after the land purchase, Collegeport officially opened Hotel Collegeport and was home to a Federated Church consisting of 14 denominations. As of 1912, the town boasted a population of 496, with a Business Men's League of 90 members, an Episcopal Church, a Woman's Club with a roster of 86 members, and a brick school house that was under construction. Collegeport also claimed the first free public library in the county. Professor Will Travis opened the Gulf Coast University of Industrial Arts and proceeded to make deals with the pioneer orange growers from the north as part of a student labor program. A point of interest in Collegeport was its rail station and Pavilion that was perched over the bay. Collegeport's State Bank was located on what is now Highway 1095 with a capital of $10,000, with Abel B. Pierce as president and J.B. McCain as cashier.

The town also had two newspapers in print: the Collegeport Chronicle and the Collegeport New Era.

Collegeport had, at its peak, consisted of three hotels, a City State Bank, a telephone exchange, two hardware stores, a drugstore, two grocery stores, a barber shop, a planing mill, carpenters, blacksmiths, a boat building shop, doctors, a dentist, a veterinarian, a lawyer, a college, a high school, an ice house, a pavilion with boat services, and the Missouri Pacific Rail Station.

=== Decline ===
Despite Hurd's claims of Collegeport's mild and warm climate, freezes began to plague the town and its farmers. In 1914, a heavy freeze passed through, killing most of the crops. The aftermath of the freeze brought a drought and a disease that killed off most of the livestock. Families suffered many losses through the freeze, causing a number of families to move away from Collegeport.

By 1935, the railroad depot was dismantled and rebuilt as the Mopac House. In 1961, Hurricane Carla moved in off the Gulf of Mexico, causing many of the original families to leave permanently.

== Present day ==
As of 2008 Collegeport has two churches, a community center, the Mopac House, a volunteer fire department, and a post office.

== Education ==
The area is within the Palacios Independent School District.

== Climate ==
The climate in this area is characterized by hot, humid summers and generally mild to cool winters. According to the Köppen Climate Classification system, Collegeport has a humid subtropical climate, abbreviated "Cfa" on climate maps.
