= Tidehaven Independent School District =

School district in Texas, United States

Address
- 205 FM 1095 El Maton, Texas, 77440; United States

District information
- Grades: PK–12
- Schools: 4
- NCES District ID: 4842810

Students and staff
- Students: 1,029 (2023–2024)
- Teachers: 73.11 (on an FTE basis)
- Student–teacher ratio: 14.07:1

Other information
- Website: www.tidehavenisd.com

Tidehaven Independent School District is a public school district based in the community of Elmaton in unincorporated Matagorda County, Texas (USA). In addition to Elmaton, the district also serves the communities of Blessing, Markham, and Midfield in western Matagorda County. Baldomero Gallegos attended Tidehaven schools.

TISD's rival is Palacios Independent School District.

In 2009, the school district was rated "academically acceptable" by the Texas Education Agency.

== Schools ==
- Tidehaven Consolidated Junior/Senior High (Grades 6–12) - school was completed in Summer of 2015
- Blessing Elementary (Grades PK-5)
- Markham Elementary (Grades PK-5)
