= Matagorda County, Texas =

County in Texas, United States

- County
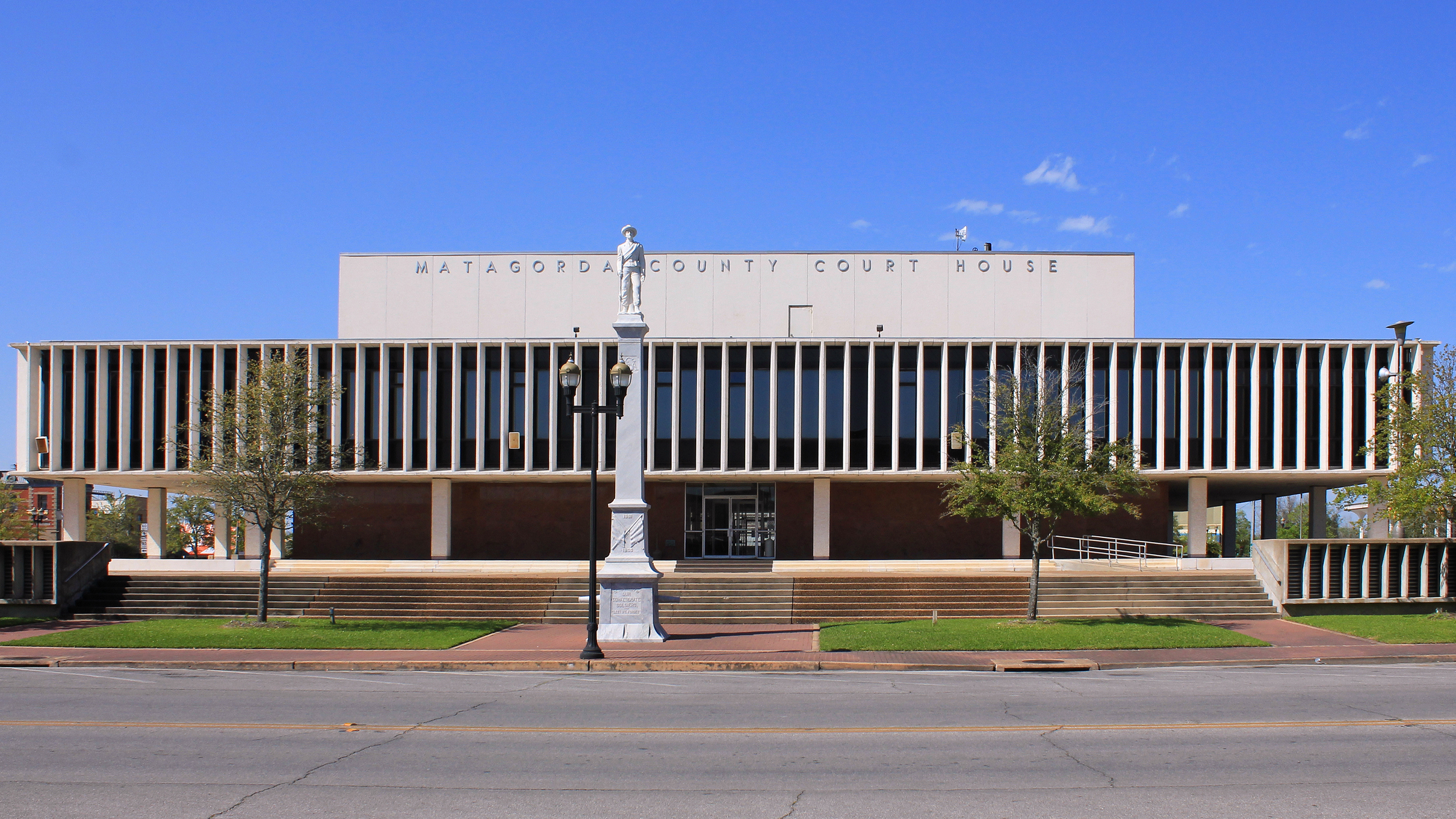
- The Matagorda County Courthouse and Confederate Soldier Statue in Bay City

- Location within the U.S. state of Texas
- Coordinates: 28°47′N 96°00′W
- Country: United States
- State: Texas
- Founded: 1836
- Seat: Bay City
- Largest city: Bay City

Area
  - Total: 1,613 sq mi (4,180 km^{2})
  - Land: 1,100 sq mi (2,800 km^{2})
  - Water: 512 sq mi (1,330 km^{2}) 32%

Population (2020)
  - Total: 36,255
  - Estimate (2025): 36,463 ▲
  - Density: 33/sq mi (13/km^{2})
- Time zone: UTC−6 (Central)
  - Summer (DST): UTC−5 (CDT)
- Congressional district: 22nd
- Website: www.matagordatx.gov

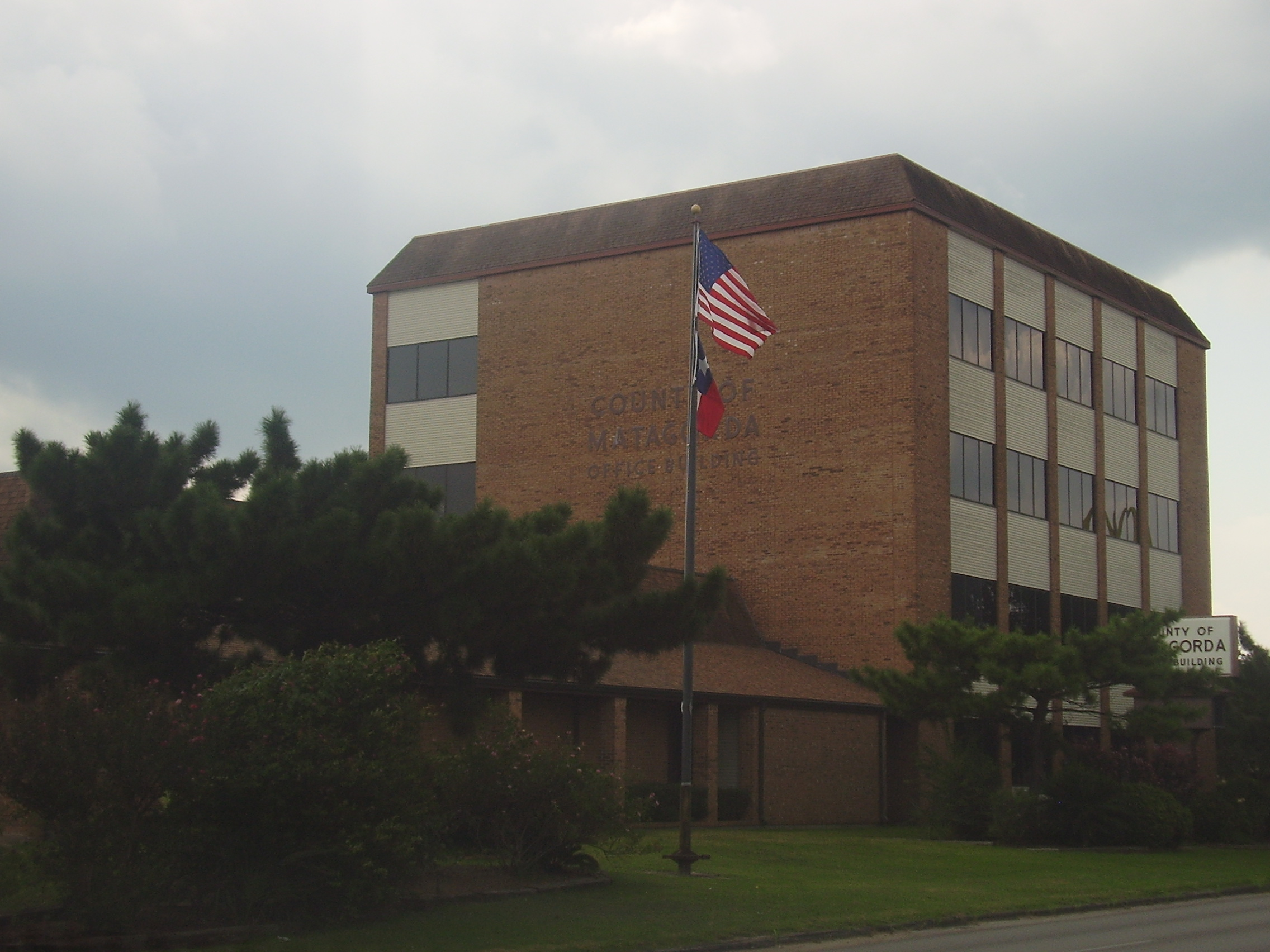
Matagorda County Office Building

Matagorda County is a county located in the U.S. state of Texas. As of the 2020 census, its population was 36,255. Its county seat is Bay City, not to be confused with the larger Baytown in Harris and Chambers Counties. Matagorda County is named for the canebrakes that once grew along the coast (matagorda is a Spanish word meaning "thick bush").

Matagorda County comprises the Bay City, TX micropolitan statistical area, which is also included in the Houston-The Woodlands, TX combined statistical area.

== Geography ==
According to the U.S. Census Bureau, the county has a total area of 1,613 square miles (4,180 km^{2}), of which 512 square miles (1,330 km^{2}) (32%) are covered by water. The water area includes Matagorda Bay. It borders the Gulf of Mexico.

=== Major highways ===
- State Highway 35
- State Highway 60
- State Highway 71
- State Highway 111

=== Adjacent counties ===
- Brazoria County (northeast)
- Calhoun County (southwest)
- Jackson County (west)
- Wharton County (northwest)

=== National protected areas ===
- Big Boggy National Wildlife Refuge
- San Bernard National Wildlife Refuge (part)

== Demographics ==
Historical population
Census	Pop.	Note	%±
1850	2,124		—
1860	3,454		62.6%
1870	3,377		−2.2%
1880	3,940		16.7%
1890	3,985		1.1%
1900	6,097		53.0%
1910	13,597		123.0%
1920	16,589		22.0%
1930	17,678		6.6%
1940	20,066		13.5%
1950	21,559		7.4%
1960	25,744		19.4%
1970	27,913		8.4%
1980	37,828		35.5%
1990	36,928		−2.4%
2000	37,957		2.8%
2010	36,702		−3.3%
2020	36,255		−1.2%
2025 (est.)	36,463	▲	0.6%
U.S. Decennial Census; 1850–2010 2010 2020

=== Racial and ethnic composition ===
Matagorda County, Texas – Racial and ethnic composition Note: the US Census treats Hispanic/Latino as an ethnic category. This table excludes Latinos from the racial categories and assigns them to a separate category. Hispanics/Latinos may be of any race.
Race / Ethnicity (NH = Non-Hispanic)	Pop 1980	Pop 1990	Pop 2000	Pop 2010	Pop 2020	% 1980	% 1990	% 2000	% 2010	% 2020
White alone (NH)	23,784	21,878	19,900	17,400	15,355	62.87%	59.25%	52.43%	47.41%	42.35%
Black or African American alone (NH)	5,435	5,030	4,778	4,060	3,734	14.37%	13.62%	12.59%	11.06%	10.30%
Native American or Alaska Native alone (NH)	63	74	125	104	99	0.17%	0.20%	0.33%	0.28%	0.27%
Asian alone (NH)	466	798	891	693	700	1.23%	2.16%	2.35%	1.89%	1.93%
Native Hawaiian or Pacific Islander alone (NH)	x	x	6	7	7	x	x	0.02%	0.02%	0.02%
Other race alone (NH)	115	60	23	33	103	0.30%	0.16%	0.06%	0.09%	0.28%
Mixed race or Multiracial (NH)	x	x	336	331	802	x	x	0.89%	0.90%	2.21%
Hispanic or Latino (any race)	7,965	9,088	11,898	14,074	15,455	21.06%	24.61%	31.35%	38.35%	42.63%
Total	37,828	36,928	37,957	36,702	36,255	100.00%	100.00%	100.00%	100.00%	100.00%

=== 2020 census ===
As of the 2020 census, the county had a population of 36,255. The median age was 38.6 years. 25.1% of residents were under the age of 18 and 17.6% of residents were 65 years of age or older. For every 100 females there were 98.7 males, and for every 100 females age 18 and over there were 96.4 males age 18 and over.

The racial makeup of the county was 54.5% White, 10.8% Black or African American, 0.9% American Indian and Alaska Native, 2.0% Asian, <0.1% Native Hawaiian and Pacific Islander, 16.4% from some other race, and 15.5% from two or more races. Hispanic or Latino residents of any race comprised 42.6% of the population.

53.3% of residents lived in urban areas, while 46.7% lived in rural areas.

There were 13,716 households in the county, of which 32.8% had children under the age of 18 living in them. Of all households, 48.9% were married-couple households, 19.3% were households with a male householder and no spouse or partner present, and 26.4% were households with a female householder and no spouse or partner present. About 26.2% of all households were made up of individuals and 11.8% had someone living alone who was 65 years of age or older.

There were 18,476 housing units, of which 25.8% were vacant. Among occupied housing units, 68.0% were owner-occupied and 32.0% were renter-occupied. The homeowner vacancy rate was 2.2% and the rental vacancy rate was 16.9%.

=== 2000 census ===
As of the 2000 census, 37,957 people, 13,901 households, and 9,925 families were residing in the county. The population density was 34 people per square mile (13 people/km^{2}). The 18,611 housing units averaged 17 units per square mile (6.6/km^{2}). The racial makeup of the county was 67.83% White, 12.72% African American, 0.67% Native American, 2.38% Asian, 14.02% from other races, and 2.38% from two or more races. About 31.35% of the population were Hispanic or Latino of any race. By ancestry, 10.3% were of German, 8.2% American, 5.4% English, and 5.2% Irish according to Census 2000, and 73.9% spoke English, 24.0% Spanish, and 1.6% Vietnamese as their first language.

Of the 13,901 households, 36.70% had children under 18 living with them, 53.80% were married couples living together, 12.70% had a female householder with no husband present, and 28.60% were not families. About 25.1% of all households were made up of individuals, and 10.4% had someone living alone who was 65 or older. The average household size was 2.70, and the average family size was 3.25.

In the county, the age distribution was 30.0% under the age of 18, 8.9% from 18 to 24, 26.90% from 25 to 44, 21.8% from 45 to 64, and 12.4% who were 65 or older. The median age was 35 years. For every 100 females, there were 98.60 males. For every 100 females 18 and over, there were 95.5 males.

The median income for a household in the county was $32,174, and for a family was $40,586. Males had a median income of $37,733 versus $21,871 for females. The per capita income for the county was $15,709. About 14.90% of families and 18.50% of the population were below the poverty line, including 23.00% of those under age 18 and 13.60% of those age 65 or over.

== Economy ==
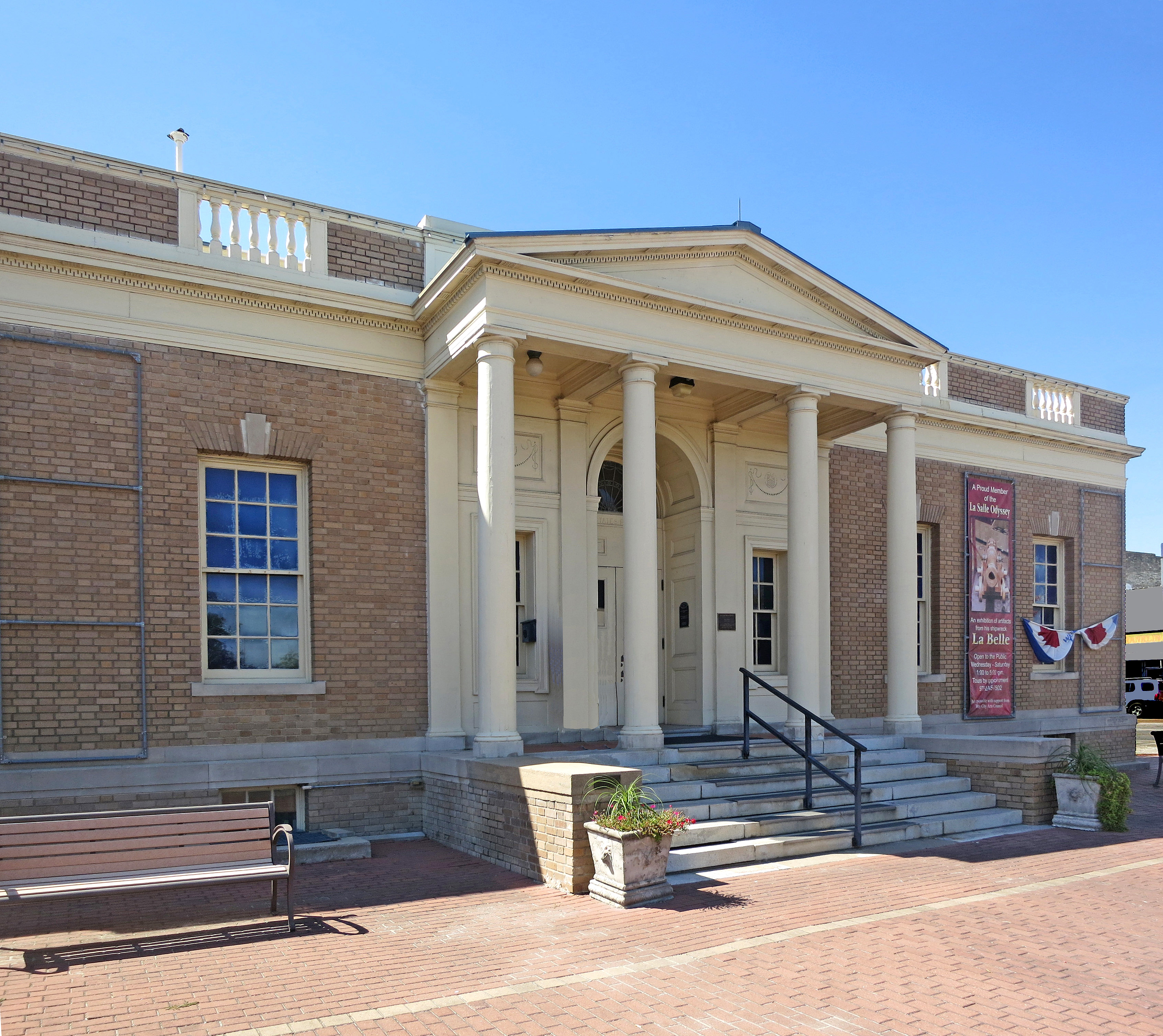
The Matagorda County Museum in Bay City is located across from the Courthouse.

Rice is grown extensively in Matagorda County, as are St. Augustine and other turf grasses. In addition to a wealth of offshore oil rigs and natural gas extraction facilities all over the county, two petrochemical processing plants (Celanese and Equistar) and the South Texas Project nuclear power plant operate within the county. Matagorda County has secluded, extensive forests, wetlands, prairie, and coastal regions. The Gulf Coast floodplain has several conditions conducive to a variety of ecosystems and recreational activities evident by the highest count of migrating birds in the United States. Fishing (on- and offshore), hunting, and scuba diving are large parts of the recreation industry due to the Colorado River, the forests, and Matagorda Bay. The Rio Colorado Golf Course and a birdwatching park are on the Colorado River near the State Highway 35 bridge, and several wildlife preserves are located around the county, a portion of which is land bought for that purpose by the two major petrochemical refineries and nuclear plant in the county.

== Education ==
School districts serving Matagorda County include:

- Bay City Independent School District
- Boling Independent School District (partial)
- Matagorda Independent School District
- Palacios Independent School District (partial)
- Tidehaven Independent School District
- Van Vleck Independent School District

Residents in Bay City, Boling, Matagorda, Palacios, Tidehaven, and Van Vleck ISDs (in other words, the entire county) are in the service area of Wharton County Junior College.

== Communities ==
=== Cities ===
- Bay City (county seat)
- Palacios

=== Census-designated places ===
- Blessing
- Markham
- Matagorda
- Midfield
- Sargent
- Van Vleck
- Wadsworth

=== Unincorporated communities ===
- Allenhurst
- Buckeye
- Caney
- Cedar Lake
- Cedar Lane
- Collegeport
- El Maton
- Hawkinsville
- Pledger

=== Ghost towns ===
- Hawley

== Notable people ==
- James Boyd Hawkins, a planter and rancher, was the founder of Hawkins Plantation.
- Charlie Siringo
- Hortense Sparks Ward
- Priscilla Richman, chief judge of the Fifth Circuit
- William Abrams (W.A.) Price was the first black attorney, the first black judge, and the first black man elected county attorney in Texas.

== Gallery ==
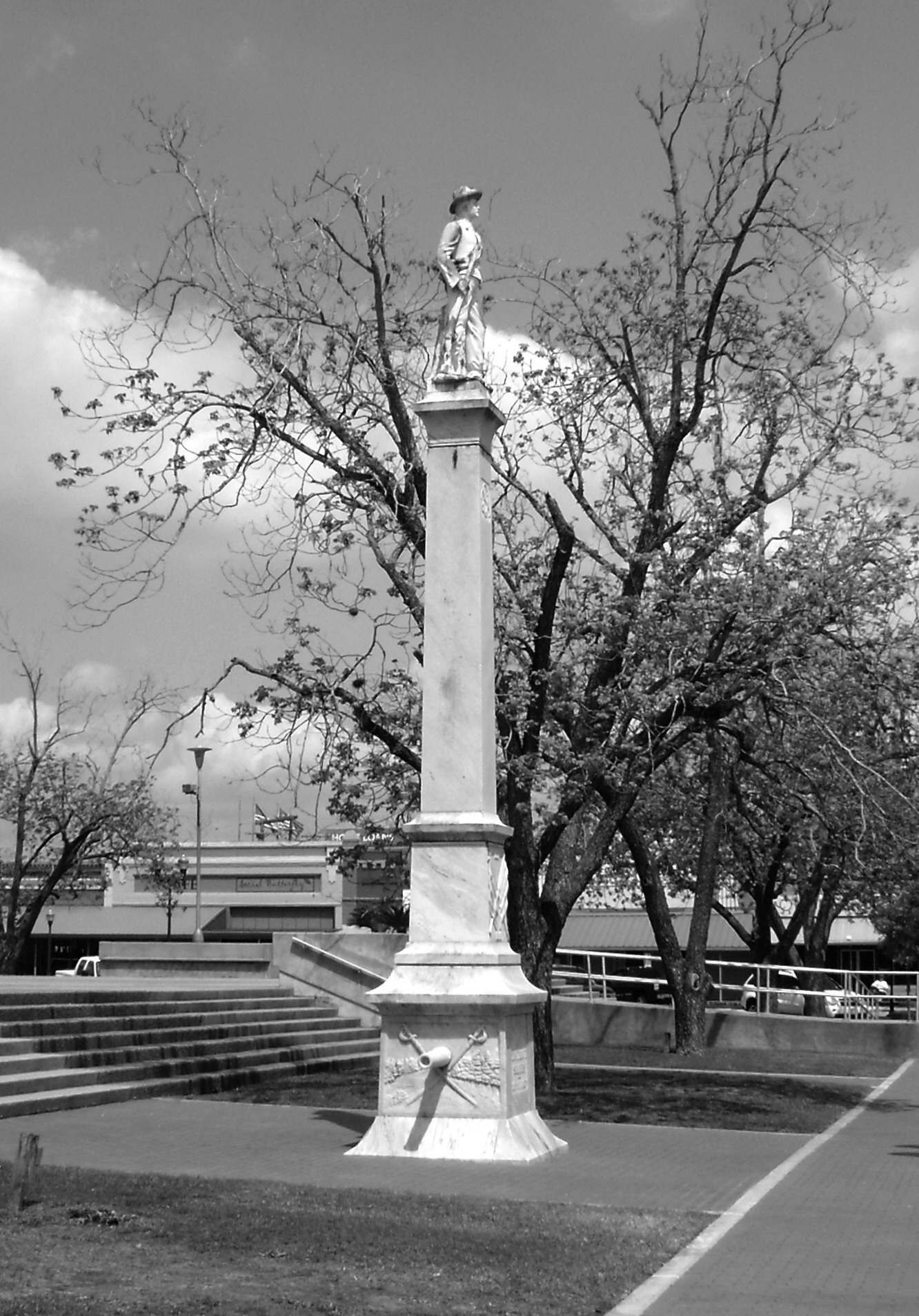
Monument erected by the Daughters of the Confederacy on the Matagorda County Courthouse Square in Bay City in 1913

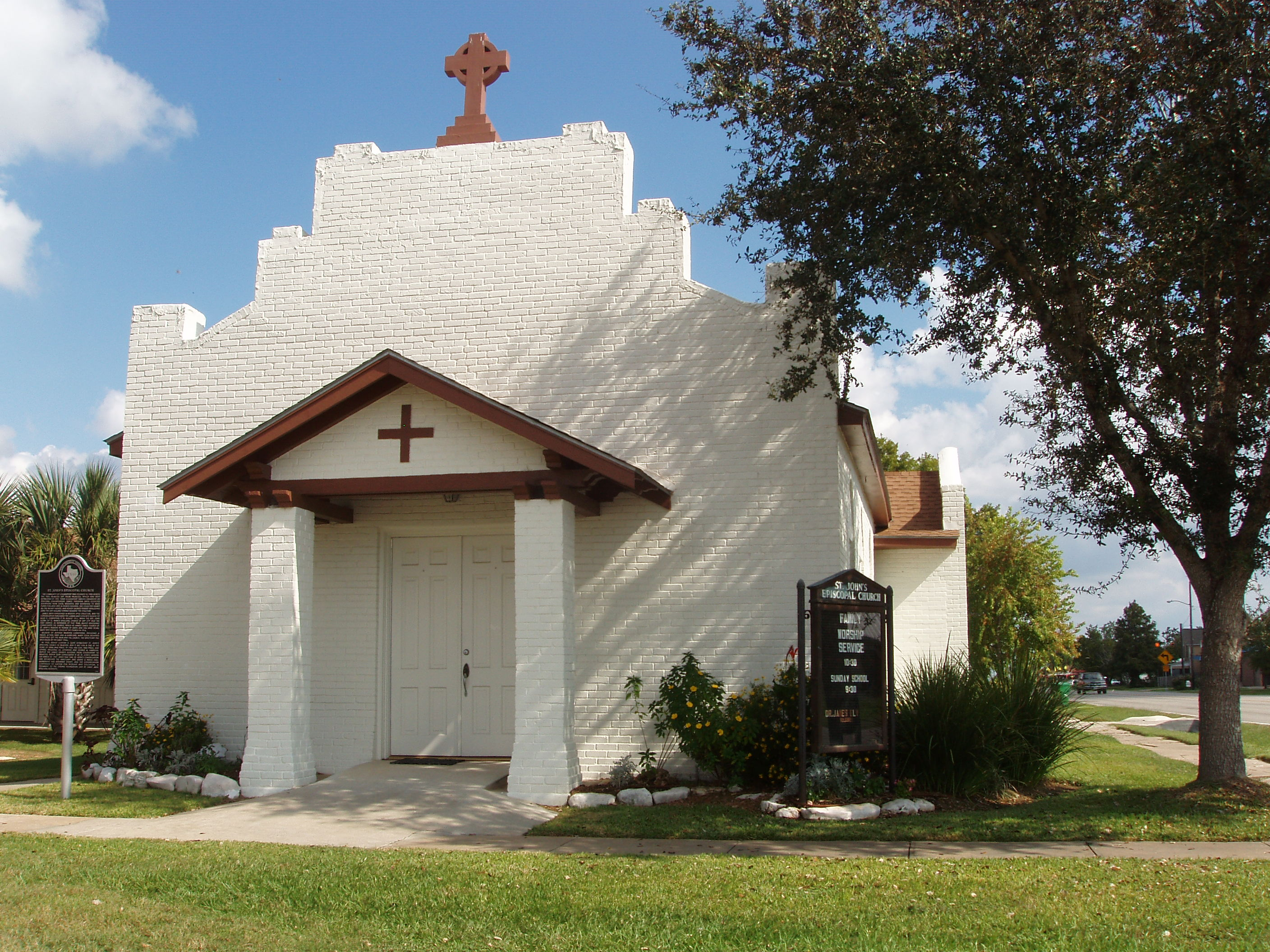
Episcopal Church, Palacios

== Politics ==
United States presidential election results for Matagorda County, Texas
Year	Republican		Democratic		Third party(ies)	
Year	No.	%	No.	%	No.	%
1912	107	9.64%	710	63.96%	293	26.40%
1916	252	23.10%	748	68.56%	91	8.34%
1920	918	43.90%	992	47.44%	181	8.66%
1924	893	37.62%	1,353	56.99%	128	5.39%
1928	1,194	58.85%	829	40.86%	6	0.30%
1932	408	16.58%	2,039	82.85%	14	0.57%
1936	459	21.21%	1,700	78.56%	5	0.23%
1940	651	23.14%	2,156	76.64%	6	0.21%
1944	412	13.43%	1,854	60.45%	801	26.12%
1948	1,016	30.80%	1,628	49.35%	655	19.85%
1952	4,122	66.23%	2,101	33.76%	1	0.02%
1956	3,927	66.46%	1,904	32.22%	78	1.32%
1960	2,975	49.60%	2,971	49.53%	52	0.87%
1964	2,407	36.72%	4,143	63.20%	5	0.08%
1968	3,094	36.55%	3,595	42.46%	1,777	20.99%
1972	5,003	66.75%	2,473	33.00%	19	0.25%
1976	3,679	42.14%	4,971	56.94%	81	0.93%
1980	5,545	53.41%	4,585	44.16%	252	2.43%
1984	8,452	61.72%	5,201	37.98%	41	0.30%
1988	6,787	54.01%	5,675	45.16%	104	0.83%
1992	5,328	40.47%	4,759	36.15%	3,078	23.38%
1996	5,876	47.03%	5,374	43.01%	1,244	9.96%
2000	7,584	60.87%	4,696	37.69%	179	1.44%
2004	8,119	64.84%	4,355	34.78%	47	0.38%
2008	7,835	63.32%	4,440	35.88%	98	0.79%
2012	8,040	66.27%	3,980	32.80%	113	0.93%
2016	8,366	68.60%	3,500	28.70%	330	2.71%
2020	9,845	71.72%	3,733	27.19%	149	1.09%
2024	9,957	74.80%	3,231	24.27%	124	0.93%

United States Senate election results for Matagorda County, Texas1
Year	Republican		Democratic		Third party(ies)	
Year	No.	%	No.	%	No.	%
2024	9,482	71.78%	3,486	26.39%	241	1.82%

United States Senate election results for Matagorda County, Texas2
Year	Republican		Democratic		Third party(ies)	
Year	No.	%	No.	%	No.	%
2020	9,647	71.55%	3,551	26.34%	284	2.11%

Texas Gubernatorial election results for Matagorda County
Year	Republican		Democratic		Third party(ies)	
Year	No.	%	No.	%	No.	%
2022	7,350	75.61%	2,273	23.38%	98	1.01%

== See also ==
- List of museums in the Texas Gulf Coast
- National Register of Historic Places listings in Matagorda County, Texas
- Recorded Texas Historic Landmarks in Matagorda County
