= Van Vleck Independent School District =

School district in Texas, United States

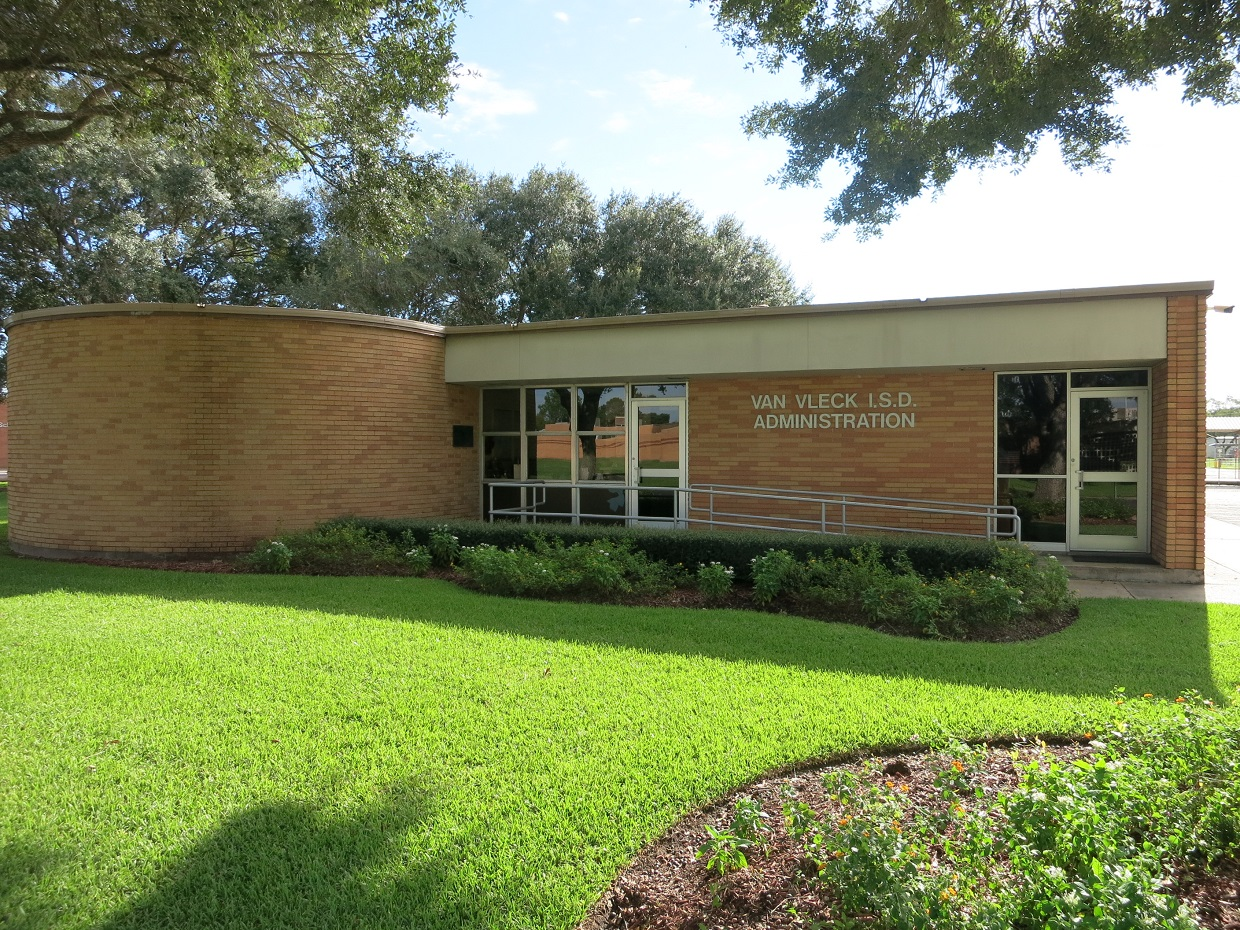
- Van Vleck ISD Administration Building

Address
- 142 South Fourth Street Van Vleck, Matagorda County, Texas, 77482; United States

District information
- Superintendent: Christie Dement
- Asst. superintendent(s): Matthew Steiner
- School board: Tony Kucera Jr (Pres), Casey Kile (VP), Terry Blackmon (Sec), Donnie O'Connell, Marcus Moss, Lauren Kubecka, Paul Kevin Ward
- NCES District ID: 4843950

Students and staff
- Students: 1,051 (2023–2024)
- Teachers: 79.32 (on an FTE basis)
- Student–teacher ratio: 13.25:1
- District mascot: Leopards
- Colors: Orange, Black

Other information
- Website: www.vvisd.org

Van Vleck Independent School District is a public school district based in the community of Van Vleck in unincorporated Matagorda County, Texas (USA). The Superintendent of Schools is Christie Dement.

The district serves the communities of Van Vleck, Allenhurst, Caney, Cedar Lake, Cedar Lane, Hawkinsville, and Sargent.

In 2009, the school district was rated "academically acceptable" by the Texas Education Agency.

Schools in the district include:

- Van Vleck High School
- Van Vleck Junior High School
- Van Vleck Elementary School
