= Matagorda Independent School District =

School district in Texas, United States

Address
- 717 Wightman Street Matagorda, Texas, 77457; United States

District information
- Grades: PK–12
- Schools: 1
- NCES District ID: 4829370

Students and staff
- Students: 113 (2023–2024)
- Teachers: 12.10 (on an FTE basis)
- Student–teacher ratio: 9.34:1

Other information
- Website: www.matagordaisd.org

Matagorda Independent School District (/ˈmætəˈɡɔːrdə/) is a public school district based in the community of Matagorda, Texas, United States.

The district has one school that serves students in prekindergarten through grade 12.

In 2009, the school district was rated "academically acceptable" by the Texas Education Agency.
