= Van Vleck, Texas =

- CDP
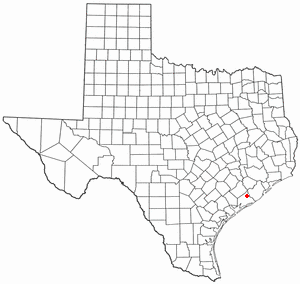
- Location of Van Vleck, Texas

- Coordinates: 29°01′44″N 95°52′26″W
- Country: United States
- State: Texas
- County: Matagorda

Area
  - Total: 3.2 sq mi (8.2 km^{2})
  - Land: 3.2 sq mi (8.2 km^{2})
  - Water: 0 sq mi (0.0 km^{2})
- Elevation: 39 ft (12 m)

Population (2020)
  - Total: 1,923
  - Density: 610/sq mi (230/km^{2})
- Time zone: UTC-6 (Central (CST))
  - Summer (DST): UTC-5 (CDT)
- ZIP code: 77482
- Area code: 979
- FIPS code: 48-75068
- GNIS feature ID: 2409500

Van Vleck is a census-designated place (CDP) in Matagorda County, Texas, United States. As of the 2020 census, Van Vleck had a population of 1,923. The population total represents one of the few areas with positive growth in Matagorda County. Although near Bay City, the site of Van Vleck falls outside the ETJ of Bay City and is regulated by county police and county ordinance.

== Geography ==
According to the United States Census Bureau, the CDP has a total area of 3.2 square miles (8.3 km^{2}), all land.

== Demographics ==
Historical population
Census	Pop.	Note	%±
1970	1,051		—
1980	1,157		10.1%
1990	1,534		32.6%
2000	1,411		−8.0%
2010	1,844		30.7%
2020	1,923		4.3%
U.S. Decennial Census; 1850–1900 1910; 1920 1930 1940; 1950 1960 1970; 1980 1990 2000; 2010

Van Vleck was first listed as an unincorporated community in the 1970 U.S. census; and census designated place in the 1980 United States census.

=== 2020 census ===
Van Vleck CDP, Texas – Racial and ethnic composition Note: the US Census treats Hispanic/Latino as an ethnic category. This table excludes Latinos from the racial categories and assigns them to a separate category. Hispanics/Latinos may be of any race.
Race / Ethnicity (NH = Non-Hispanic)	Pop 2000	Pop 2010	Pop 2020	% 2000	% 2010	% 2020
White alone (NH)	783	1,029	1,000	55.49%	55.80%	52.00%
Black or African American alone (NH)	245	233	204	17.36%	12.64%	10.61%
Native American or Alaska Native alone (NH)	4	5	4	0.28%	0.27%	0.21%
Asian alone (NH)	1	7	1	0.07%	0.38%	0.05%
Native Hawaiian or Pacific Islander alone (NH)	0	0	0	0.00%	0.00%	0.00%
Other race alone (NH)	2	0	5	0.14%	0.00%	0.26%
Mixed race or Multiracial (NH)	14	16	59	0.99%	0.87%	3.07%
Hispanic or Latino (any race)	362	554	650	25.66%	30.04%	33.80%
Total	1,411	1,844	1,923	100.00%	100.00%	100.00%

=== 2010 census ===
The 2010 census showed a 25% increase with 1,844 people (versus 1,411 at the 2000 census). Further census details are pending.

As of the census of 2000, there were 1,411 people, 505 households, and 397 families residing in the CDP. The population density was 444.4 inhabitants per square mile (171.6/km^{2}). There were 578 housing units at an average density of 182.1 per square mile (70.3/km^{2}). The racial makeup of the CDP was 70.09% White, 17.51% African American, 0.35% Native American, 0.07% Asian, 8.72% from other races, and 3.26% from two or more races. Hispanic or Latino of any race were 25.66% of the population.

There were 505 households, out of which 36.4% had children under the age of 18 living with them, 61.4% were married couples living together, 13.7% had a female householder with no husband present, and 21.2% were non-families. 18.8% of all households were made up of individuals, and 7.1% had someone living alone who was 65 years of age or older. The average household size was 2.79 and the average family size was 3.18.

In the CDP, the population was spread out, with 29.2% under the age of 18, 8.4% from 18 to 24, 26.9% from 25 to 44, 23.3% from 45 to 64, and 12.1% who were 65 years of age or older. The median age was 37 years. For every 100 females, there were 97.6 males. For every 100 females age 18 and over, there were 94.7 males.

The median income for a household in the CDP was $30,810, and the median income for a family was $40,170. Males had a median income of $31,034 versus $14,438 for females. The per capita income for the CDP was $15,595. About 3.6% of families and 4.8% of the population were below the poverty line, including 2.1% of those under age 18 and 19.3% of those age 65 or over.

== Economy ==
The local economy is mostly dependent on industrial work in plants at local Sweeny and Bay City. Many Bay City residents of higher income choose to live in the Van Vleck ISD. The Van Vleck area has benefitted greatly from the commercial development just minutes away on Highway 35 that have included several new restaurants, banks, hotels, and a new Walmart supercenter.

The town site (town center) of Van Vleck has undergone slow but gradual improvements with a new post office, church, and a restaurant with a seating capacity of over 100. Also found in Van Vleck are several Mexican/Hispanic restaurants serving the local Hispanic population and non-Hispanics alike, a doughnut store, a fireworks stand, several gas stations, and equipment rental/sales shops.

Although it is of similar size to other nearby towns such as West Columbia, Van Vleck has benefited from high traffic counts equal to or more than most areas of the larger and nearby Bay City. Traffic counts are three times the average for a comparable small town as reported by TXDOT.

Over 10,000 cars pass through the town using the main arterial Texas Highway 35 that connects Bay City to Texas State Highway 288 and U.S. Route 59. The proximity to the growing potential of Bay City has been to Van Vleck's advantage.

The town also has a small but well recognized ISD.

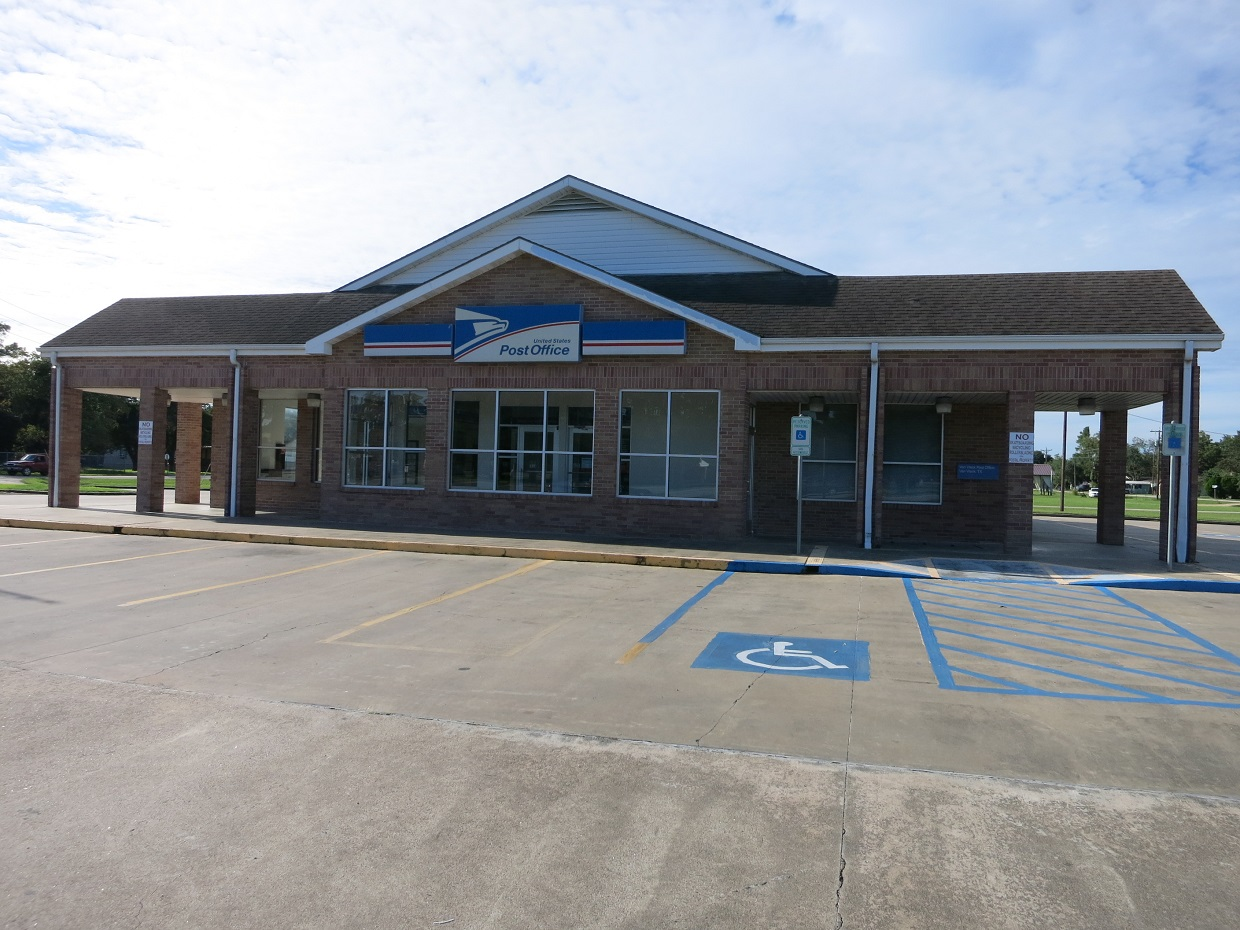
US Post Office on Highway 35

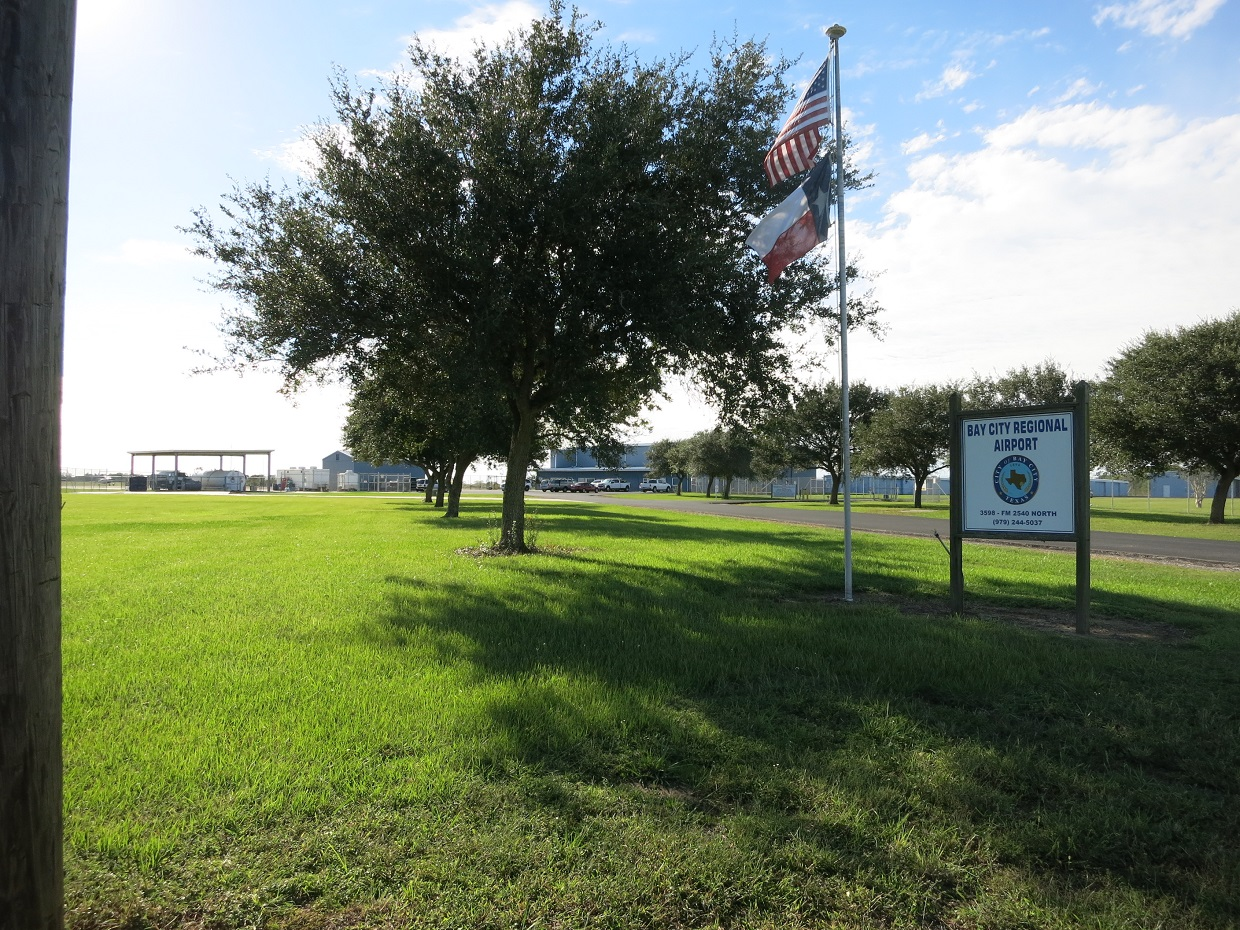
Bay City Regional Airport is on FM 2540 south of town

== Popular culture ==
In popular culture, Van Vleck is often mentioned for its small but well known small town features. This is also the hometown of Charles Austin.

== Healthcare ==
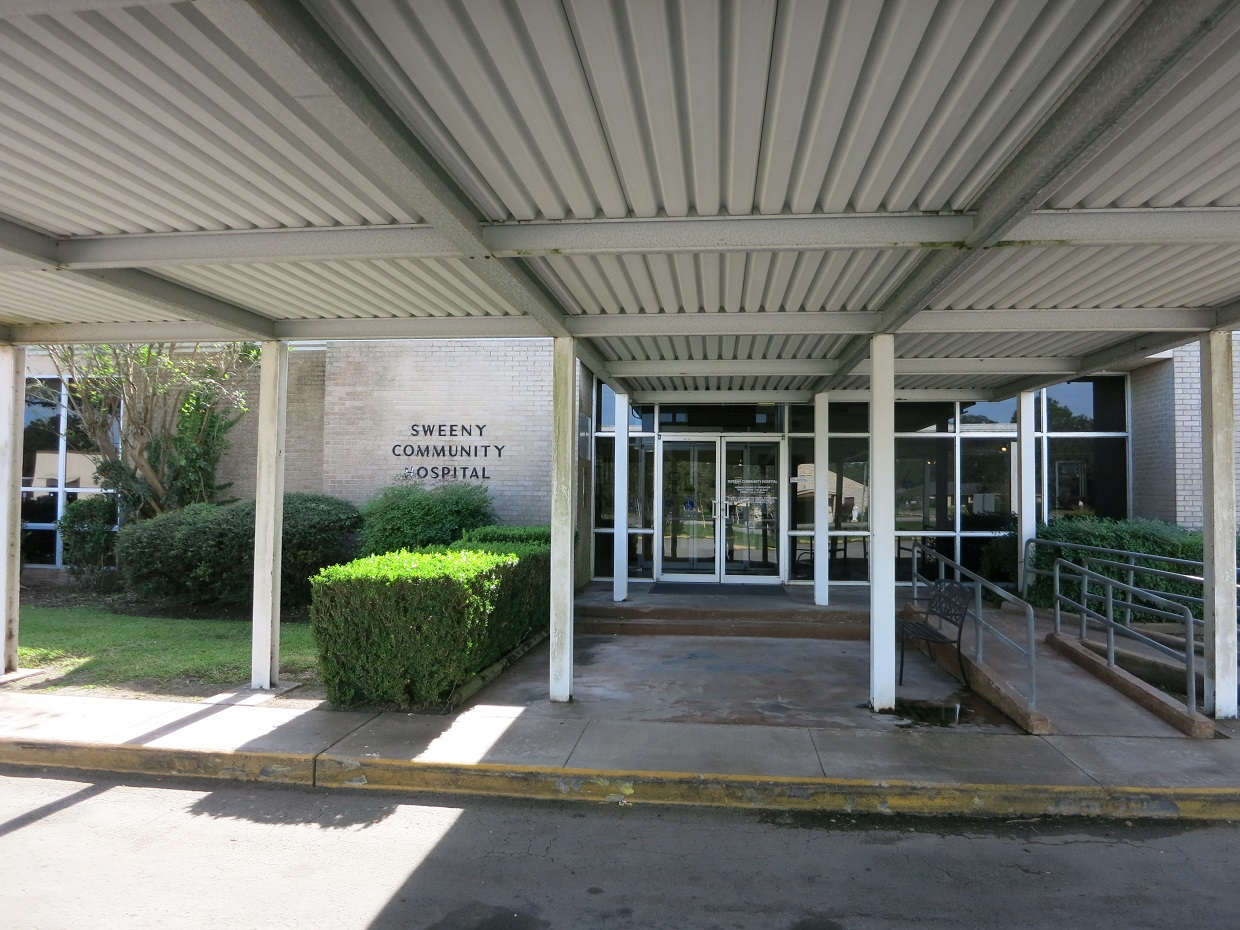
Sweeny Community Hospital

Van Vleck does not have any local hospitals. For regular and urgent care, residents rely on the nearby Sweeny Community Hospital and its multiple growing clinics. The strong demand has allowed Sweeney to add 1-2 new physicians a year despite the distance from other towns like Van Vleck. Also, a closer and more often used center is Matagorda Regional Medical Center in Bay City. This facility was built in July 2009. Multiple physicians and specialties are available in Bay City.

The regional demand for healthcare is very strong as most doctors/hospitals are not currently drawn to the area. The revamped Matagorda Regional Medical Center has made strides in attracting new physicians and fulfilling the medical needs of the county. The hospital is working on developing a regional cancer center, and regularly runs at capacity.

== Education ==
Van Vleck is served by the Van Vleck Independent School District. Van Vleck ISD has Academically State Recognized District and Schools. They have one-to-one digital learning, K-12 STEM Courses, K-12 Fine Arts Programs, 6-12 Pre-Advanced & Advanced Placement Classes, 9-12 Career & Technical Education Courses, and Dual Credit Classes. There is Van Vleck Elementary, E.Rudd Intermediate, O.H. Herman Middle School, and Van Vleck High School. The ISD has several recognitions that include a National Blue Ribbon Elementary School. The VVISD is the winner and record setter in numerous areas, including power lifting and jump sports, with first place in multiple years, including those set by Charles Austin. They have a state recognized FFA Chapter & Meat Processing Plant, State Recognized Fine Arts Programs and Outstanding UIL Sports Programs.

The local high school also is a recurring winner, and title holder, of multiple national sports competitions.

The designated community college for Van Vleck ISD is Wharton County Junior College.

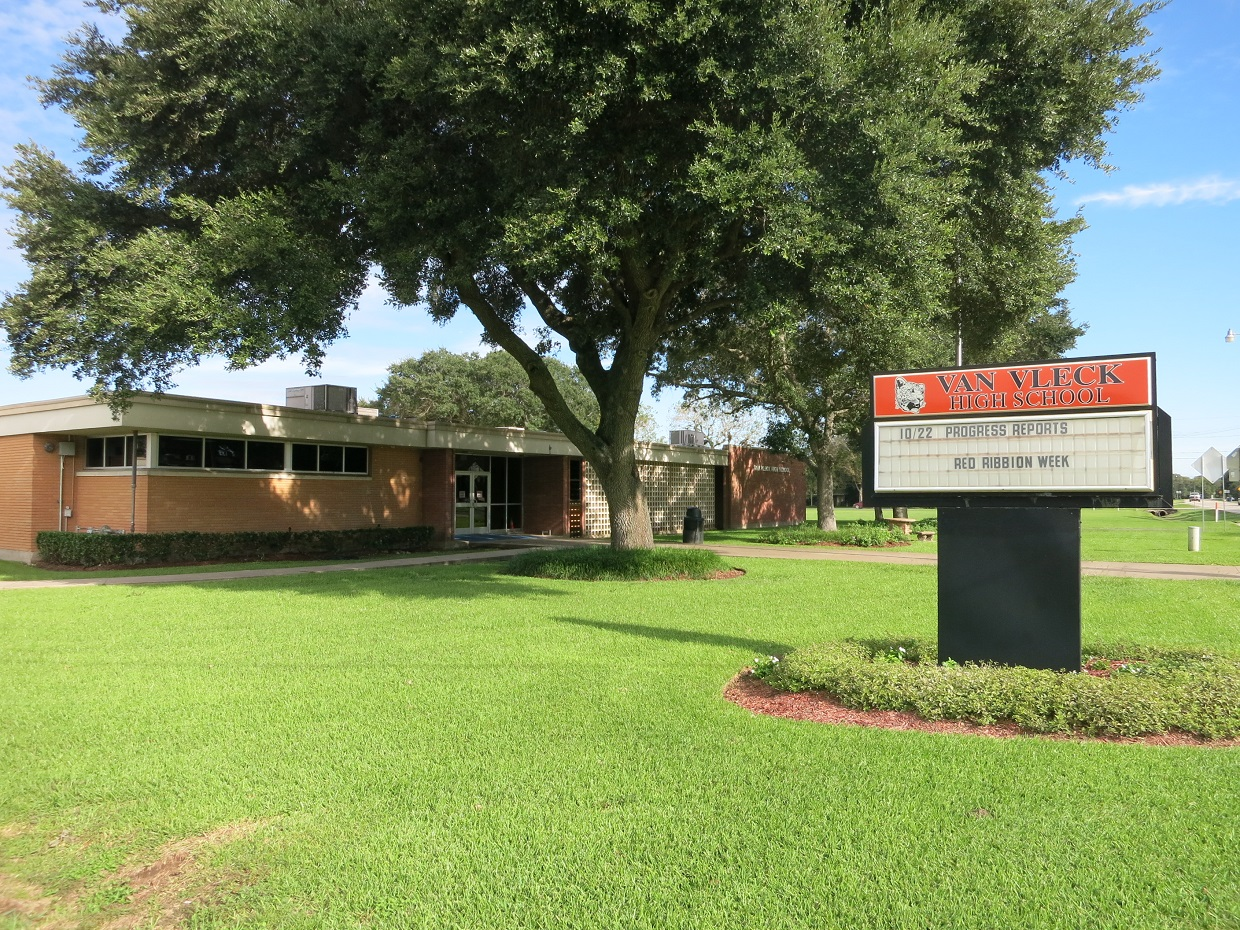
Van Vleck High School

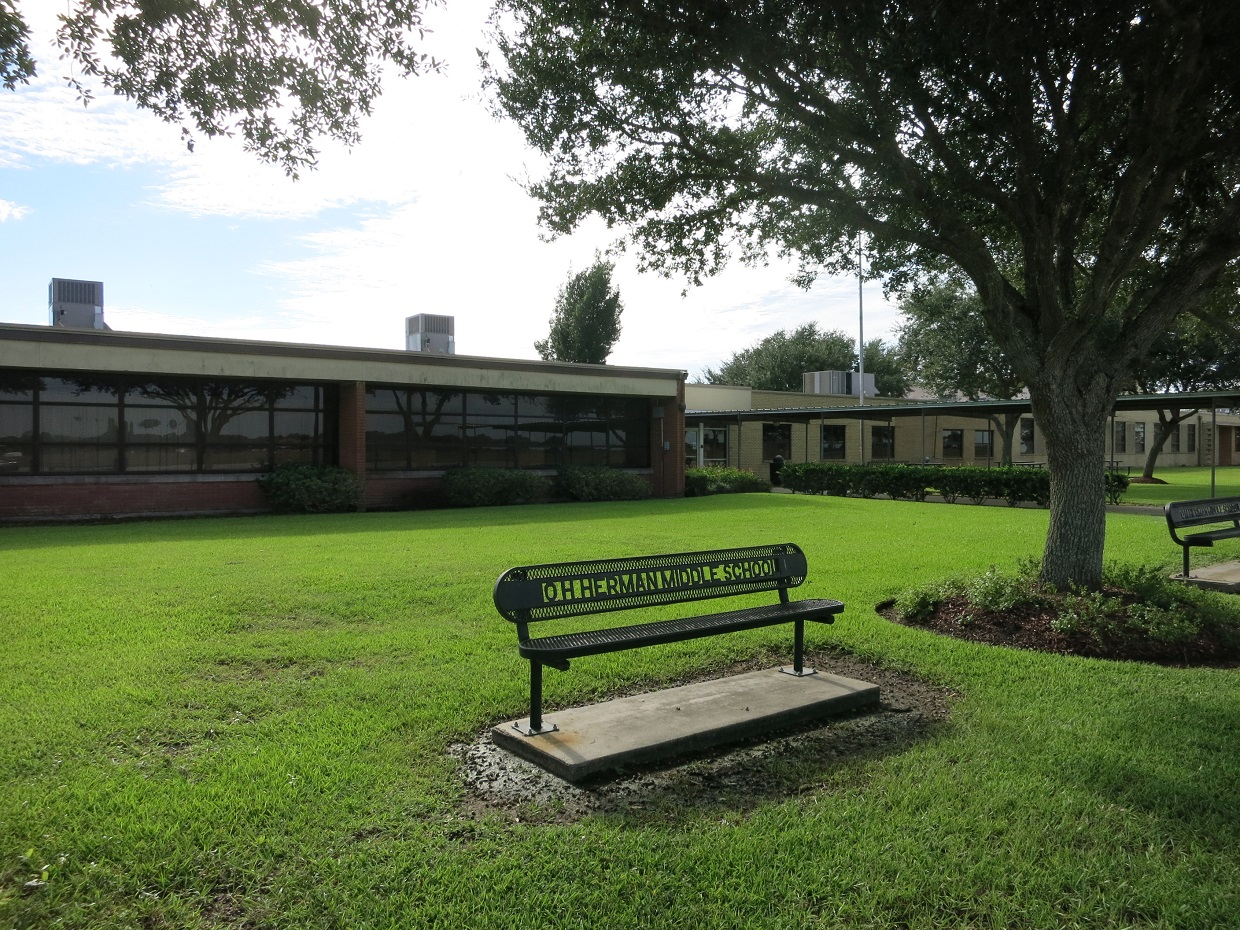
O.H. Herman Middle School

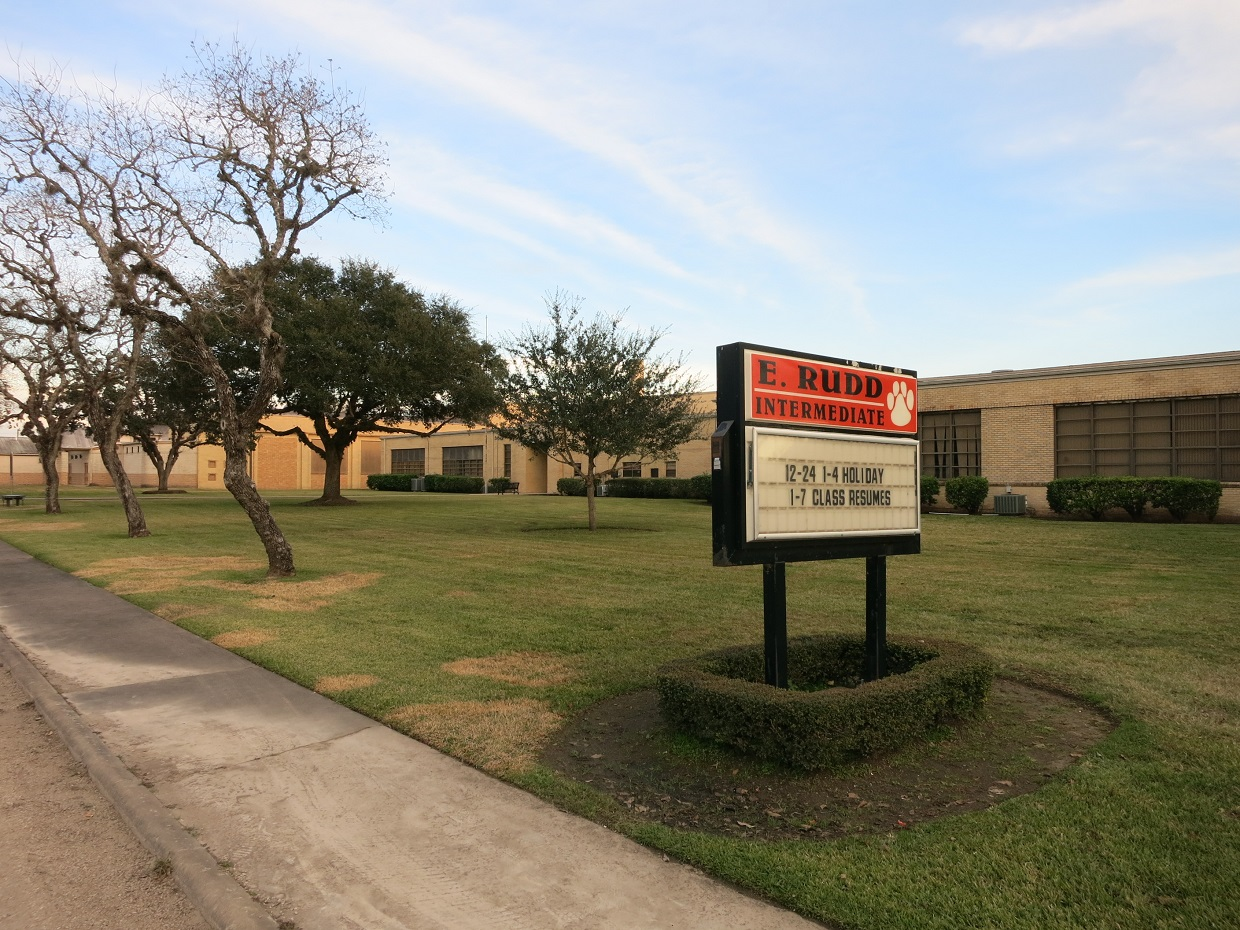
E. Rudd Intermediate School

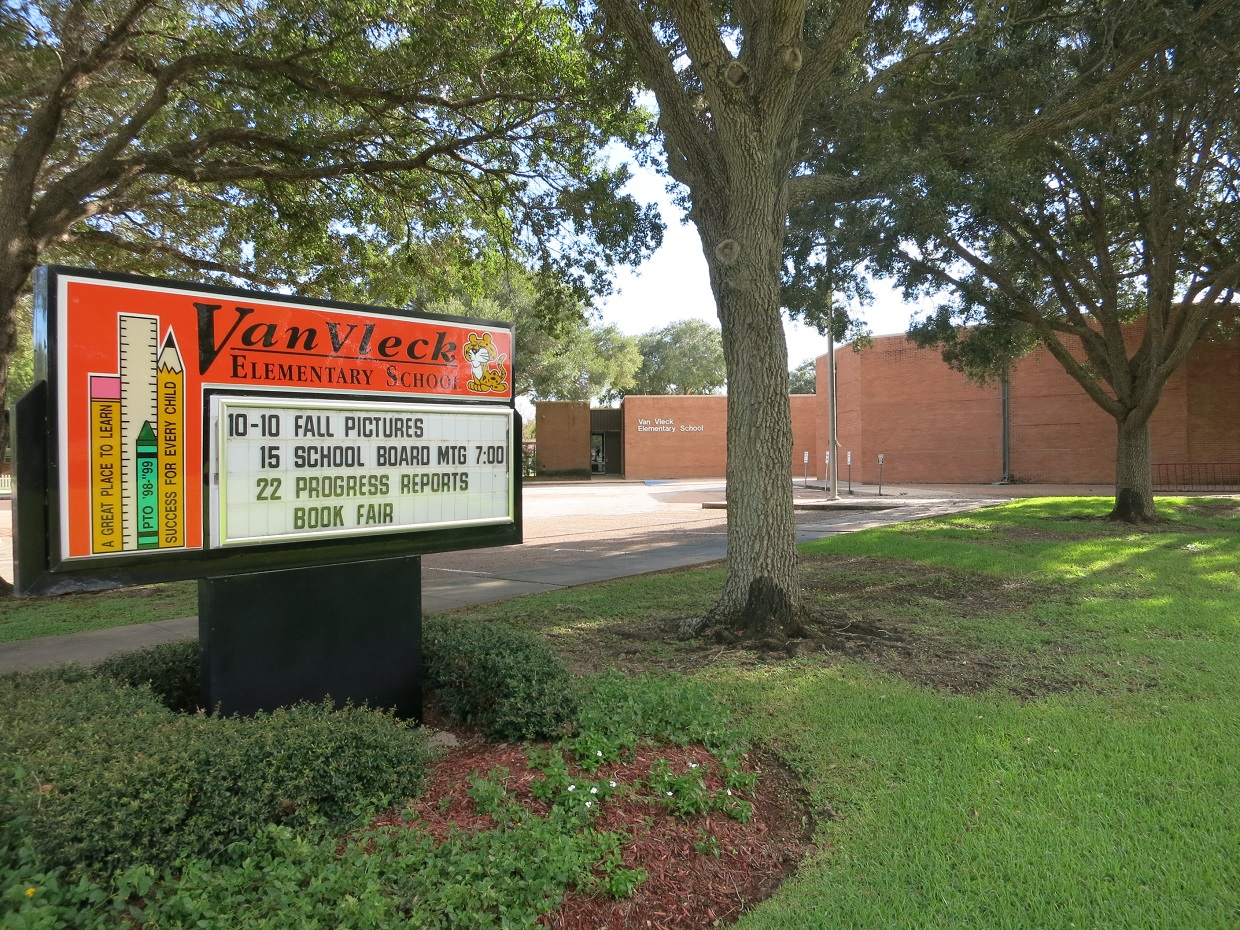
Van Vleck Elementary School

== Time line of Van Vleck ==
1830s Bailey Hardeman moved to this location in Matagorda county in the early part of the decade.
1836 Hardeman dies of fever just 1 mile south of Van Vleck in Caney Creek. Today this area is known as Caney but was called Caney Crossing during the days of the Republic of Texas. It is named for the Caney Creek
1840s The area became known as Hardeman's Post Office, after Bailey Hardeman, one of the signers of the Texas Declaration of Independence
1900s The Texas and New Orleans railroad (T&NO rail road) brings rail lines to Matagorda County with a stop in Van Vleck. The T&NO was a subsidiary of Southern Pacific Railroad
1901 Town officially named for W. G. Van Vleck, a railroad official who served as the company's southern pacific superintendent. Several Hardeman families still live in Matagorda county and Van Vleck has a road named Hardeman road This year, the railroad connected Van Vleck to Wharton Tx.
1930 The town was originally northwest of its present location, but in 1930, when State Highway 35 was built, the town moved to the highway.
1952 First Baptist Church was built
1955 Methodist church built
1996 Charles Austin, of Van Vleck Texas wins olympic gold medal
2010 Population count expands by 25% from prior census of 2000
2010 First Physician clinic to serve the area, a Dermatology clinic opens its doors.
2010 First Baptist Church of Van Vleck builds new church on 4 acre lot on Highway 35 just east of the Van Vleck High School Football Burl McKinney Stadium
2015 Van Vleck Lions Club is established.
