= Wharton County Junior College =

Community college in Wharton, Texas, U.S.

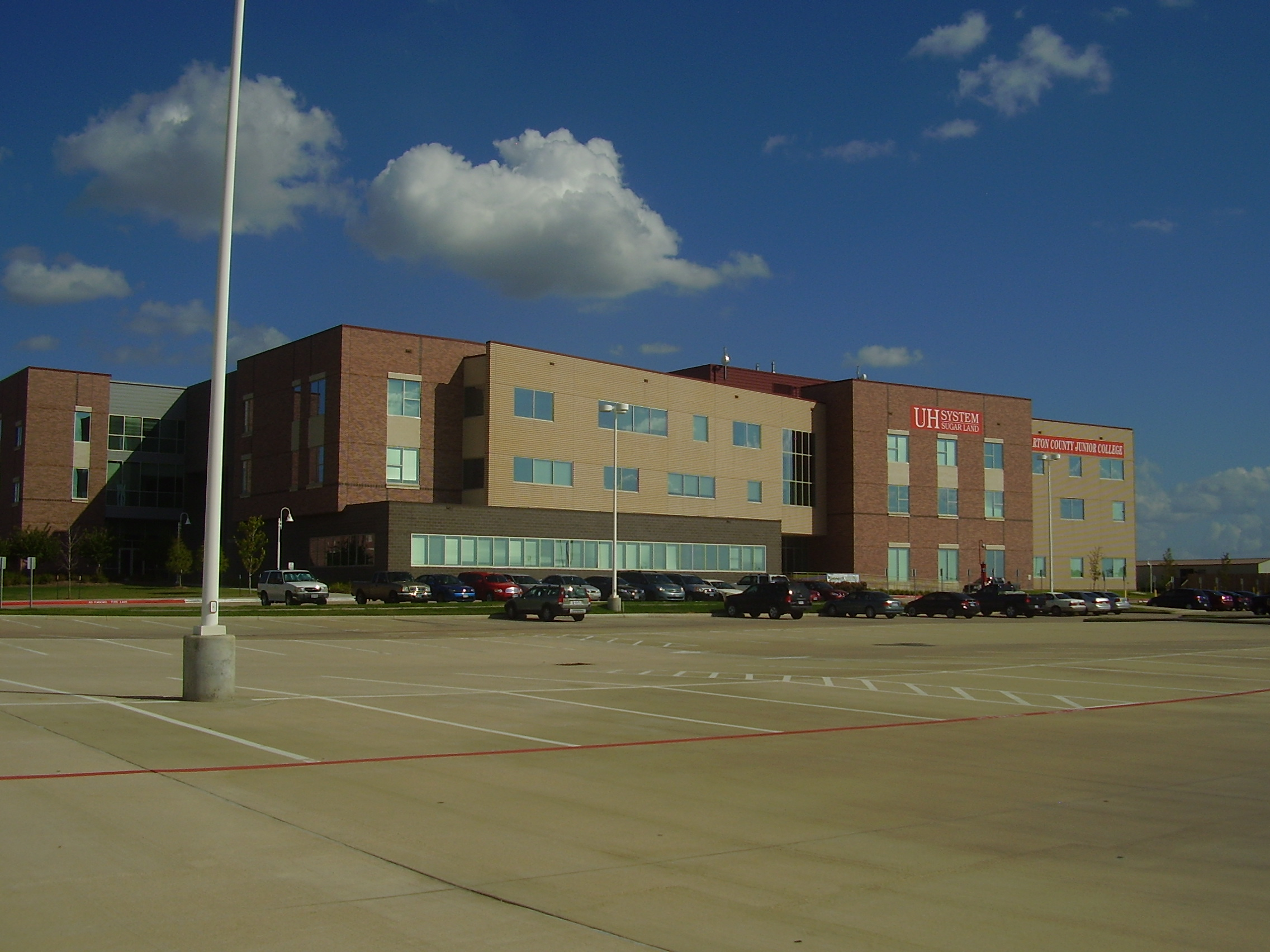
- Wharton County Junior College; Sugar Land campus
- Type: Public community college
- Established: 1946
- Accreditation: SACS
- President: Dr. Amanda Allen
- Students: 6,099 (Fall 2021)
- Location: Wharton, Texas, United States; 29.324642°N 96.084935°W
- Mascot: Pioneers
- Website: www.wcjc.edu

Wharton County Junior College (WCJC) is a public community college with its main campus in Wharton, Texas. The college also has campuses in Richmond, Sugar Land, and Bay City.

WCJC offers a range of postsecondary educational programs and services including associate degrees, certificates, and continuing-education courses.

State Representative Phil Stephenson served on the Wharton County Junior College board of trustees from 1997 to 2012, when he was first elected to the legislature from District 85 in Fort Bend, Wharton, and Jackson counties.

As defined by the Texas Legislature, the official service area of WCJC is the following:

- all of Wharton County,
- the territory within the Kendleton, Lamar, and Needville school districts, and the territory within the incorporated area and extraterritorial jurisdiction of Sugar Land, all in Fort Bend County,
- the territory within the Wallis-Orchard Independent School District in Austin County,
- the territory within the Columbus, Rice Consolidated, and Weimar school districts in Colorado County,
- the territory within the Ganado Independent School District in Jackson County,
- the territory within the Bay City, Boling, Matagorda, Palacios, Tidehaven, and Van Vleck school districts in Matagorda County.

== See also ==
- Sugar Land, Texas
- Wharton, Texas
- Fort Bend County, Texas
- Wharton County, Texas
