= Wanda Garner Cash =

American author and event director

Wanda Garner Cash (born December 21, 1949, in Laredo, Texas) is an author and the retired director of the Texas Arts & Crafts Fair at the Hill Country Arts Foundation in Ingram, Texas. Cash retired in 2016 as associate director of the School of Journalism at the University of Texas at Austin. During her long journalism career, Cash was an advocate for open government, speaker, commentator, expert witness and media adviser on open government issues to former Texas Attorney General Greg Abbott. Her most recent book is "Pancho Villa's Saddle at the Cadillac Bar."

== Early life ==
Cash was born December 21, 1949, in Laredo, Texas. She attended Ursuline Academy for 11 years and graduated from J. W. Nixon High School in 1967. Cash is known by her nickname, "Fluffy."

She worked for the Joske's of Texas department store chain as coordinator of radio and television advertising. Cash received a Bachelor of Science in Journalism in 1971 from UT-Austin and attended the UT Graduate School of Education where she was certified as a secondary reading specialist in 1975. She married Richard M. Cash in 1975. They have two sons, Austin Garner Cash and Cooper McNeece Cash.

== Career ==
After returning to college for a graduate degree, she taught high school journalism for seven years at Burbank High School in San Antonio, Texas.

After a being a reporter, editor, publisher and newspaper owner, in 2006 she became a clinical professor and the first Fellow to the S. Griffin Singer Professorship at the University of Texas at Austin. Cash studied under Singer at UT in the late 60s.

At UT, she was associate director of the School of Journalism and previously served as the chairman of the executive committee of Texas Student Media. In 2012, and was named to the Texas Intercollegiate Press Hall of Fame.

Cash taught reporting at the undergraduate and graduate levels. With co-authors George Sylvie, Dave Garlock and Diana Dawson, she wrote a new textbook for J315 classes that was used for the first time in the fall 2009 semester. She retired in August 2016.

She has served as past president of the Texas Press Association and Freedom of Information Foundation of Texas and Texas Associated Press Managing Editors. The Baytown Sun noted her "passionate commitment to journalistic standards" and that she had been a "mentoring editor" for a number of journalists at the paper. That work included her 2005 leadership of a media coalition that eventually culminated in the 2009 passage of the Free Flow of Information Act, the Texas shield law.

In September 2016, The Freedom of Information Foundation of Texas gave Cash with the James Madison Award, honoring those who have demonstrated outstanding commitment to upholding the principles of the First Amendment and open government. In April 2006, the Texas Associated Press Managing Editors association honored Cash with the Jack Douglas Award for outstanding service to journalism.

At the state level, Texas Supreme Court Chief Justice Tom Phillips in 2004 named her to the Texas Judicial Advisory Council's Committee on Public Access to Court Records. During her tenure as TPA president, Cash contributed chapters and edited The News in Texas, an anthology of essays commemorating the 125th anniversary of the press association's founding. She is at work on an oral history of retired and active Texas newspaper leaders.

At the national level, she served on the Freedom of Information Committee of the American Society of News Editors and was a delegate in an ASNE study mission to Cuba in October 2002. Within the industry, Cash is past president of the Texas Press Association, Freedom of Information Foundation of Texas and Texas Associated Press Managing Editors, Cash has devoted her career to mentoring young journalists and advocating for open government and public access. She has been a TPA member since 1982 and on the board of directors since 1998, working primarily with the Legislative Advisory Committee, with members from both TPA and the Texas Daily Newspaper Association. Through this group and various other media affiliations, she has been a long-time advocate of open government, testifying at the Legislature, organizing FOI education efforts, lobbying for public access and resisting attempts to limit the public's right to know. That work included her leadership of a media coalition in 2005 to push for a Texas shield law.

As a past president of the FOI Foundation, Cash traveled to Mexico in 1998, meeting with newspaper editors hoping to draft that country's first freedom of information laws. She remains on the FOIFT board where she is part of the Light of Day project, which aims to develop greater emphasis on open government reporting in journalism programs at Texas colleges and universities.

== Civic involvement ==
Cash served two terms as president of the Texas State Arts and Crafts Fair and the Hill Country Arts Foundation. In 1992, Gov. Ann Richards appointed her to the board of the Lower Colorado River Authority. In other civic areas, Cash has served two terms as president of the Hill Country Arts Foundation. In 2010, she coordinated the relocation of the Stonehenge II visual art installation from its location on FM 1340 near Hunt, Texas to the HCAF grounds on Texas State Highway 39 in Ingram.

== Footnote references ==
- Hill Country Arts Foundation board of directors
- Texas Library, LCRA board appointments
- How Texas Government Can be Transparent and Open Texas Tribune
- The Impact of Social Media on Open Government
- UT Austin Experts Guide
- The Molly National Journalism Prize
- One Less Worry in the Lone Star State
- Texas Newspaper Oral History
- Austin-LCRA water deal has some wary
- The News in Texas
- Texas Student Media
- Cash discusses the new College of Communication Building
