= Camp Mystic =

Private summer camp in Texas, US

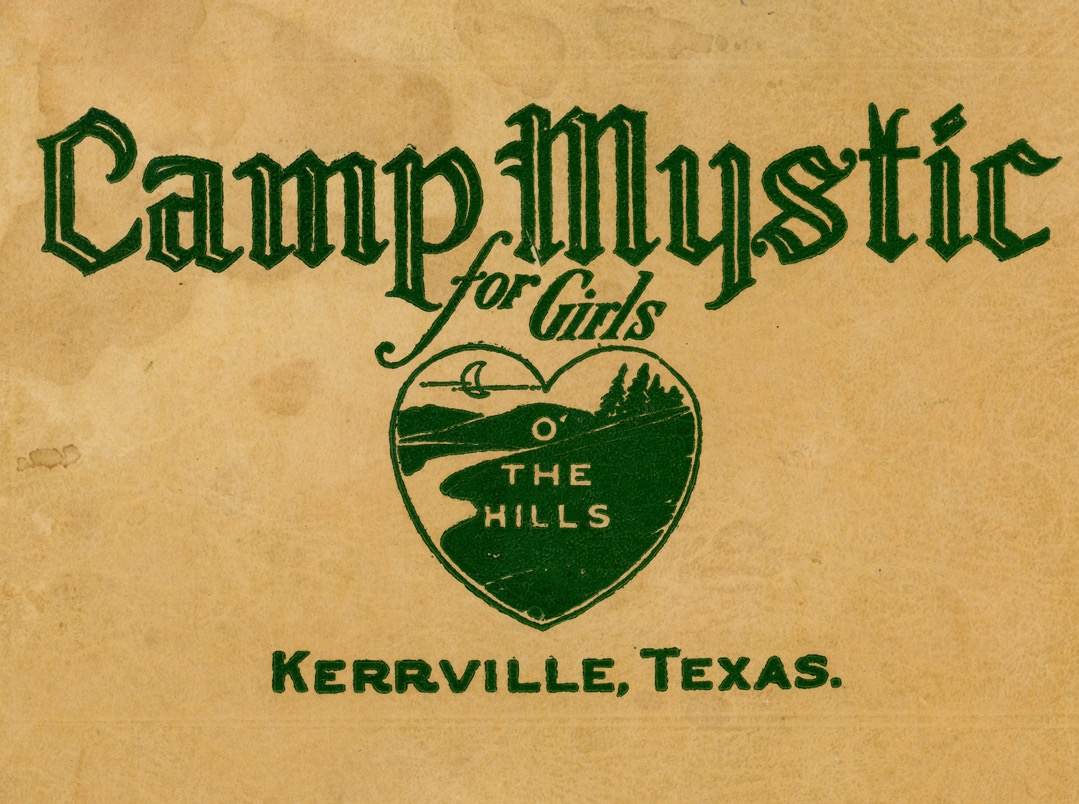
- Image from 1926 brochure

- Location within Texas Location within the United States
- Location: Kerr County, Texas, US
- Coordinates: 30°00′33″N 99°22′13″W
- Previous names: Stewart's Camp for Girls
- Campus size: 725 acres (293 ha)
- Established: 1926
- Website: campmystic.com

Camp Mystic is a private non-denominational Christian girls' summer camp in unincorporated Kerr County, Texas, US. It is set on a 725-acre (293 ha) campus consisting of two neighboring sites 6 miles (9.7 km) southwest of Hunt, near the confluence of the South Fork Guadalupe River and Cypress Creek. The camp serves girls aged eight to seventeen.

The camp was severely damaged in the July 2025 Central Texas floods; 28 people from the camp died, including 25 campers, two counselors, and the director.

== History ==
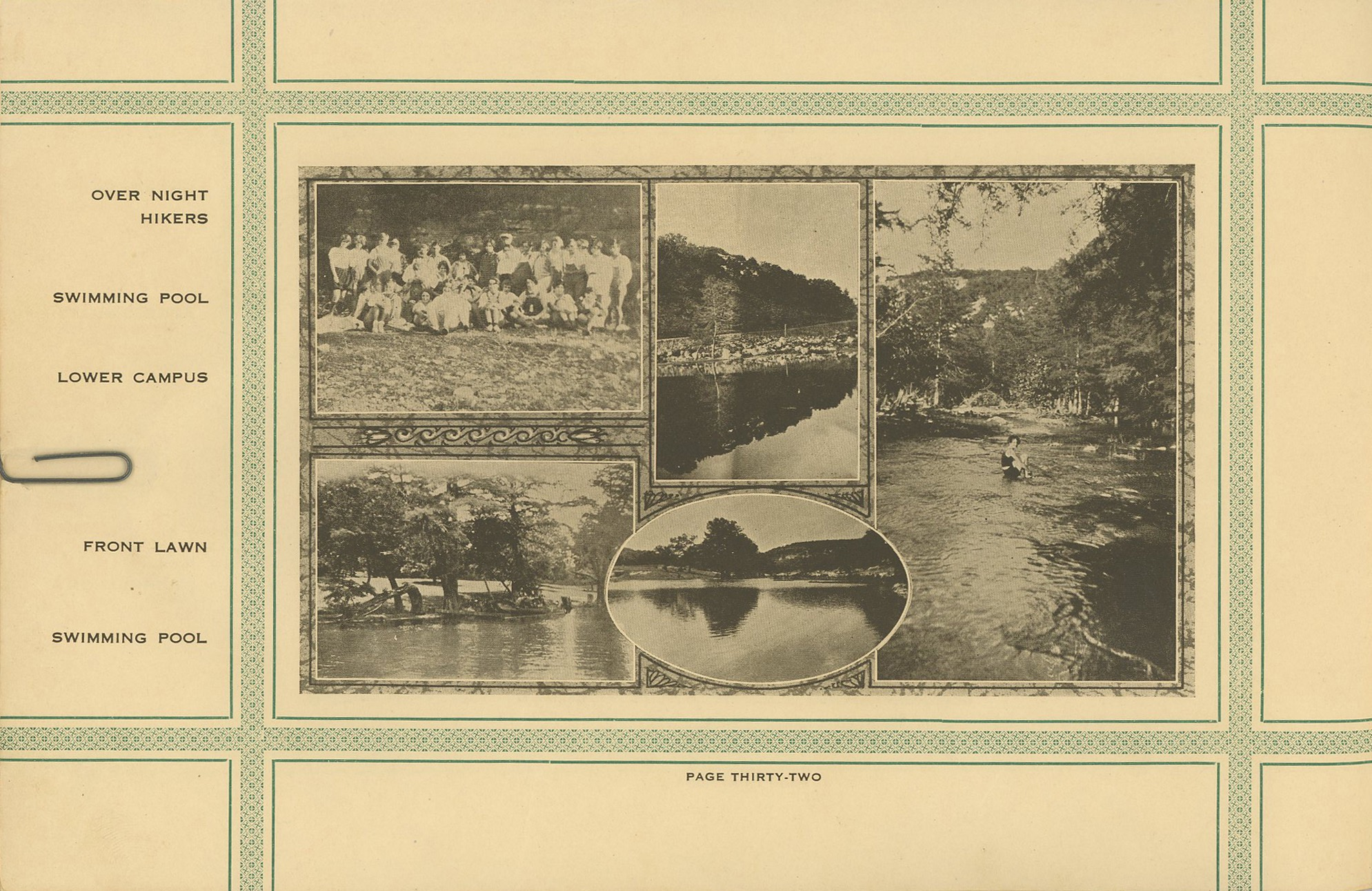
Activities shown in brochure, 1920s

The camp was founded in 1926 by E. J. Stewart, under the name Stewart's Camp for Girls. It offered a single eight-week session each summer. In July 1932, the camp suffered a flash flood which washed away several cabins, but no fatalities were reported. In 1937, the camp was purchased by the Stacy family, who have maintained ownership ever since. By 1934 and until at least June 1942, the camp hosted a ten-day Aquatic School led by the Red Cross. Although the camp is Christian, some Jewish Texans also sent their children there, as there were no Jewish summer camps in the area in the 1930s.

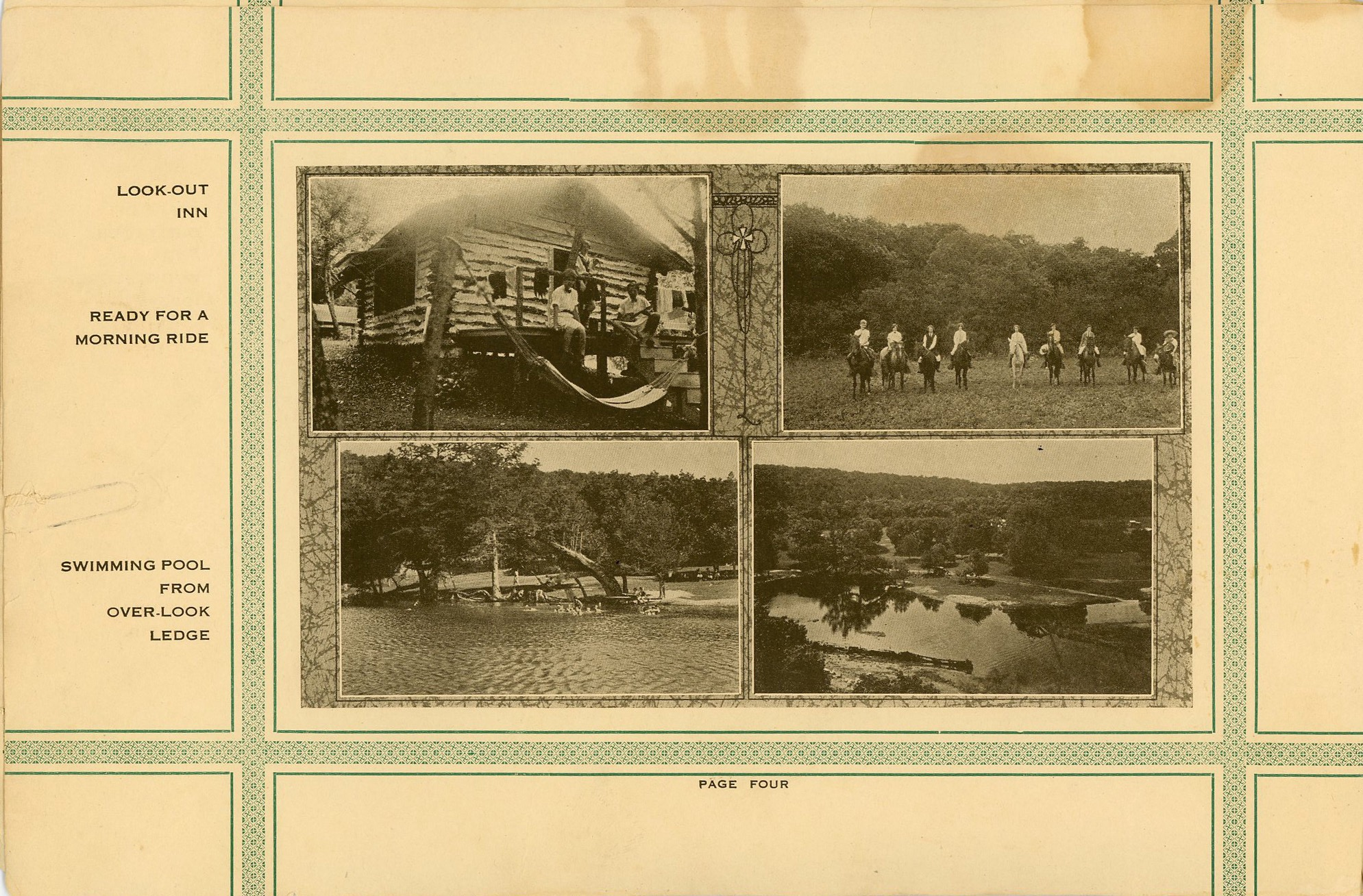
Landscape and buildings

The camp paused operations during World War II from 1943 to 1945, when it functioned as a rest and relaxation site for soldiers, offering two six-week sessions. Following the war, the camp began offering two sessions each summer.

Inez "Iney" and Frank Harrison were brought to Mystic in December 1948 by then-owner Agnes "Ag" Stacy. They were directors of Mystic from 1948 until their retirement in 1987.

In 1978, the camp was impacted by flooding from the Guadalupe River. A program director later recalled that staff transported more than 100 campers by station wagon to higher ground during the night. The camp also faced flooding again in 1984.

The camp offered two camp sessions a year until 1983, when a third session was added. By 1996, a session at Camp Mystic cost $635 (equivalent to $1,304 in 2025). In 2011, a 30-day session cost $4,300 (equivalent to $6,154 in 2025).

In the late 2000s and early 2010s, camp leadership underwent a protracted family feud. As of 2025, the camp was owned by Dick and Tweety Eastland.

In the 2010s, the camp expanded from their original Guadalupe site to the new Cypress Lake site. This expansion included the construction of cabins, a dining hall, a chapel, and an archery range for the new site.

=== 2025 flooding ===
The camp was hosting 557 campers at the beginning of July 2025, its second session that summer. Under Texas state regulations, the camp was required to have an emergency plan "in case of a disaster", which officials from the Texas Department of State Health Services approved on July 2. The state of Texas does not approve or retain copies of such plans; camps are only required to demonstrate that a plan exists.

The camp was not accredited by the American Camp Association, which recommends that campers and staff be trained to respond to natural disasters.

==== Flooding ====
At 1:18 a.m. CDT (UTC−05:00) on July 4, 2025, the National Weather Service office in San Antonio issued a flood watch for Kerr County, Texas, and surrounding areas that would later be impacted by severe flooding. At about 4:00 a.m. on July 4, flash flooding began in Kerr County; officials were unable to issue evacuation orders due to the speed at which events unfolded. The Guadalupe River rose 26 feet (7.9 m) in approximately 45 minutes.

It was later reported that camp director Dick Eastland, age 70, had received a flash flood warning at 1:14 a.m. but did not begin evacuations until around 2:30 a.m., more than an hour later. However, the flood warning did not include an evacuation order. By that time, the river was already rising rapidly. When the Guadalupe campsite flooded, campers took shelter in cabins, a recreation hall, and on nearby hilltops.

By dawn, campers at both the Guadalupe and Cypress Lake sites had no access to food, running water, or power. Rescue efforts were underway by the afternoon of July 4, with campers transported to an elementary school in Ingram, Texas, that was being used as a reunification center.

Twenty-eight people died in the flooding: 25 campers aged 8–10, two counselors aged 18 and 19, and Dick Eastland. Eastland died while attempting to rescue campers; his body was found in an SUV along with those of three Bubble Inn campers. The camp's infrastructure was heavily damaged; a gatehouse and storage building were destroyed. As of February 6, 2026, all but one of the bodies had been recovered.

==== Aftermath and legal proceedings ====
In September 2025, Camp Mystic announced in an email that it would partially reopen the Camp Mystic–Cypress Lake campus, which had not sustained damage during the flood, for the summer of 2026. In November 2025, the families of six children and the two counselors killed in the flooding filed two lawsuits against the camp’s owners and other parties, claiming negligence. The suit claims that despite the camp being located in a known high-risk flood zone, campers were told to remain in their cabins, the camp had not adopted a legally required evacuation plan, and staff prioritized saving equipment over evacuation—creating what the filings described as a "self-created" disaster. Separate lawsuits were also filed by the families of two other deceased campers.

Shortly after the suits were filed, Camp Mystic issued two statements—one from the camp and one from its attorneys—offering prayers for the families and asserting that there had been no prior warning and that the flood was completely unexpected. A lawsuit filed by Will and CiCi Steward, the parents of camper Cile Steward, whose body has not been recovered, alleges that the camp ignored multiple flood warnings.

In December 2025, Camp Mystic announced that it would install a flood warning system on the campgrounds. By February 2026, five lawsuits representing 15 families had been filed against the camp. That same month, Will and CiCi Steward sought an injunction to prevent Camp Mystic from reopening in March 2026 as planned, arguing that reopening would "destroy evidence". On March 4, 2026, Judge Maya Guerra Gamble ruled in the plaintiffs' favor to halt renovations to the Guadalupe Camp until the investigations were complete, but allowing the Cypress Lake campus to re-open in the summer of 2026.

In April 2026, it was announced that Camp Mystic would not be reopening for the summer. The decision came following hearings in which Texas lawmakers questioned whether the camp was adequately prepared to reopen. The camp was also criticized during the two-day hearing for failing to plan and train staff to evacuate cabins during floods and how the chaotic evacuation began too late.

On June 24, 2026, Camp Mystic filed for Chapter 11 bankruptcy protection, listing assets between $1 million and $10 million and liabilities between $10 million and $50 million. In September, the camp put forth a bankruptcy protection plan that would auction off 749 acres (303 ha) of land.

== Facilities and administration ==
The camp is set on about 725 acres (293 ha) in unincorporated Kerr County, Texas, 6 miles (9.7 km) southwest of the community of Hunt. The campus consists of two neighboring sites near the confluence of the South Fork Guadalupe River and Cypress Creek. The camp serves girls aged eight to seventeen.

The camp's recreation hall was built in the 1920s, using lumber from local cypress trees.

As of 2018, the camp had 78 counselors. At the time of the 2025 flood, the camp had 108 staff.

== Activities and traditions ==
As of 2018, the camp offered three sessions each summer: two 30-day sessions and a 13-day session in early August.

From a compilation of local and contemporary media: The camp offers a wide range of outdoor activities, including archery, canoeing, cheerleading, fishing, horseback riding, lacrosse, and riflery, as well as indoor activities such as cooking, journalism, and "beauty", including classes in "politeness training" and facials. Upon arrival, campers choose their activities and receive individual schedules. Campers are divided into two teams—the Kiowa and Tonkawa "tribes"—which compete in sports and games throughout each session.

Campers do not have access to electronics and are encouraged to write letters home. Parents are offered a one-way email service to contact their children.

Sundays are "reserved for praise and worship on the waterfront and vespers on Chapel Hill".

Campers are assigned seats in the dining hall, with arrangements changed weekly. Fried chicken is served every Sunday, and Blue Bell ice cream is offered daily for dessert after lunch.

The camp maintains ties with the boys' camps Camp Stewart and Camp Rio Vista, and campers visit Mystic for dances and "a program of skits".

== Alumni ==
Some campers have been children or grandchildren of Texas governors Price Daniel, Dan Moody, and John Connally. First Lady Laura Bush worked as a counselor at the camp while she was in college, and Lady Bird Johnson attended events at the camp.

=== Former campers ===
- Rosebud Baker – American comedian and actress
- Pamela Brown – American TV reporter/newscaster (born 1983)
- Luci Baines Johnson – American businesswoman and philanthropist (born 1947)
- Mary Martin – American singer and actress (1913–1990)
- Lynda Bird Johnson Robb – First Lady of Virginia and daughter of Lyndon B. Johnson (born 1944)

== See also ==
- Christian Camp and Conference Association – American member organization for Christian camps
