= Texas State Highway 27 =

State highway in Texas

State Highway 27
- SH 27 highlighted in red

Route information
- Maintained by TxDOT
- Length: 39.052 mi (62.848 km)
- Existed: 1917–present

Major junctions
- West end: I-10 near Mountain Home
- SH 16 at Kerrville
- East end: I-10 at Comfort

Location
- Country: United States
- State: Texas
- Counties: Kerr, Kendall

Highway system
- Highways in Texas; Interstate; US; State; Former; Toll; Loops; Spurs; FM/RM; Park; Rec
← I-27	→ SH 28

State Highway 27 is located in Kerr and Kendall counties and runs parallel to Interstate 10.

== History ==
Historic SH 27

SH 27 was a route proposed in late July 1917 to run from Ft. Stockton to El Paso. On March 18, 1918, a section from San Antonio to Sonora was added. On August 21, 1923, it became one continuous route from San Antonio to Balmorhea. Everything west of Balmorhea became a portion of SH 3. The section from Kerrville to Bandera was cancelled, and the section from Bandera to San Antonio was renumbered as part of SH 81. SH 27 was rerouted southeast to Boerne replacing a portion of SH 41. In 1927, it was cosigned with U.S. Highway 290. On May 20, 1931, SH 27 was extended west over a portion of SH 3, which was rerouted. On June 20, 1933 (map was on June 15), the western portion was reassigned northwest from Ft. Stockton, replacing SH 192 and the northern portion of SH 17, while the old alignment between Ft. Stockton and west of Balmorhea renumbered as SH 196. SH 27 also extended southeast to Port O'Connor, replacing portions of SH 81 and SH 29. In 1934, SH 27 was no longer cosigned with US 290 (which was rerouted) east of near Junction but was still cosigned with it from Junction to Ft. Stockton. The section from Fort Stockton to New Mexico was codesignated with U.S. Route 285 by 1934. The section from San Antonio to Port Lavaca was codesignated with U.S. Route 87. On September 26, 1939, all cosigned sections were removed in favor of their U.S. Highway designations, the section from Port Lavaca to SH 185 was redesignated as an extension of SH 238, and the section from SH 185 to Port O'Connor was redesignated as an extension of SH 185. On March 18, 1975, the section from Junction to Mountain Home was removed as it was replaced by I-10.

== Route description ==
SH 27 begins at exit 488 on I-10 in Kerr County north of the town of Mountain Home. The highway heads southeast and east from I-10 to an intersection with SH 41 in Mountain Home. The highway continues to the southeast, generally paralleling to the south of I-10, to an intersection with RM 479. It continues heading southeast until it reaches an intersection with SH 39 in Ingram. From this intersection, SH 27 heads east towards Kerrville. In Kerrville, the highway has intersections with FM 1338 and RM 783 before a junction with SH 16. As the highway leaves Kerrville, it passes by Kerrville Municipal Airport. SH 27 begins to head to the east as it enters Center Point, where it has an intersection with RM 480. The highway continues on to the east with a slight turn to the northeast as it enters Comfort. The highway intersects RM 473 and US 87 in Comfort. It has a short concurrency with US Bus 87 until SH 27 ends at an interchange with I-10 southeast of Comfort.

== Major intersections ==
County	Location	mi	km	Destinations	Notes
Kerr		0.0	0.0	I-10 – Junction	I-10 exit 488.
Kerr	Mountain Home	2.1	3.4	SH 41 to I-10 – Rocksprings	
Kerr		6.6	10.6	RM 479 north – Noxville	
Kerr	Ingram	13.6	21.9	SH 39 west – Hunt	
Kerr	Kerrville	17.0	27.4	Loop 98 (Thompson Drive)	
Kerr	Kerrville	17.4	28.0	FM 1338 (Goat Creek Road)	
Kerr	Kerrville	18.2	29.3	RM 783 north (Harper Road) – Harper	
Kerr	Kerrville	19.4	31.2	FM 394 south (Francisco Lemos Street)	
Kerr	Kerrville	19.8	31.9	SH 16 (Sidney Baker Street) – Bandera, Fredericksburg	
Kerr	Kerrville	22.6	36.4	Loop 534 (Veterans Highway) to SH 173 / I-10	
Kerr	Kerrville	23.1	37.2	Spur 100 north	
Kerr	Center Point	29.7	47.8	RM 480 south – Center Point	
Kerr		31.8	51.2	FM 1350 west – Center Point, Bandera	
Kendall	Comfort	38.2	61.5	RM 473 – Sisterdale	
Kendall	Comfort	38.7	62.3	Bus. US 87 north – Fredericksburg	West end of Bus. US 87 overlap
Kendall		39.5	63.6	I-10 / FM 289 to FM 1621 – Boerne, San Antonio, Waring	East end of Bus. US 87 overlap; I-10 exit 524.
1.000 mi = 1.609 km; 1.000 km = 0.621 mi: Concurrency terminus
