= Divide Independent School District =

School district in Texas

- Kerr County, Texas; United States

Information
- Type: Public school district
- Established: 1882
- Website: divideisd.net

Divide Independent School District is a public school district based in the community of Mountain Home in western Kerr County, Texas, United States.

In terms of students served, Divide ISD is the smallest district in Texas; the 2015 "graduation/promotion ceremony" featured a mere 11 students and the district had as few as eight students at the beginning of the 2014–2015 school year. Divide ISD serves much of western Kerr County. Divide ISD is one of the few remaining schools called "one room schoolhouses" in the United States. Technically it is not a one-room schoolhouse according to a Texas Monthly article by Katy Vine, as the original school building – still in use – does not hold the pre-Kindergarten classes. In the original building there are two classrooms since the district divided the original single room into two.

Divide Independent School District consists of one school: Divide Elementary School, serving grades pre-Kindergarten through six. Students attend middle and high school in the neighboring Ingram Independent School District.

In 2007 it was rated "exemplary" by the Texas Education Agency. Katherine Leal Unmuth of The Dallas Morning News stated that year that, because Divide ISD had such a small student body, it could more easily get an exemplary rating under TEA rules at the time compared to larger districts; due to differing demographics, Divide ISD could gain exemplary ratings by succeeding in three of 36 different tasks.

== History ==
In 1882 the Divide Common School District was established. Early in its history, the school moved according to the district's population patterns.

Fred "Barney" Klein obtained the funds to establish the school to serve an area that became populated after the state government built the relevant section of Texas State Highway 41; this school building opened in 1936, and it remained in the same location since.

The district was previously named the Divide Common School District but received its current name on July 1, 1989; on that day its ID number changed from #133‐012 to #133‐905. The district is not to be confused with the former Divide Independent School District which in 1985 became part of the Blackwell Consolidated Independent School District.

== District area ==
The district, about 340 acres (140 ha) in size, lacks centers of commerce and business and consists of ranchland. As of 2002 about 200 people live in its area.

== Demographics ==
The student body varies from period and period due to the nature of employment on ranches.

== Transportation ==
As of 2015 the district uses a converted limousine purchased from a buyer in Dallas as a school bus.

== See also ==
- Allamoore Independent School District - A former one room schoolhouse
- Juno Common School District - A former one room schoolhouse
- Non-high school district
