= Ingram Tom Moore High School =

Public school in Texas, United States

Tom Moore High School
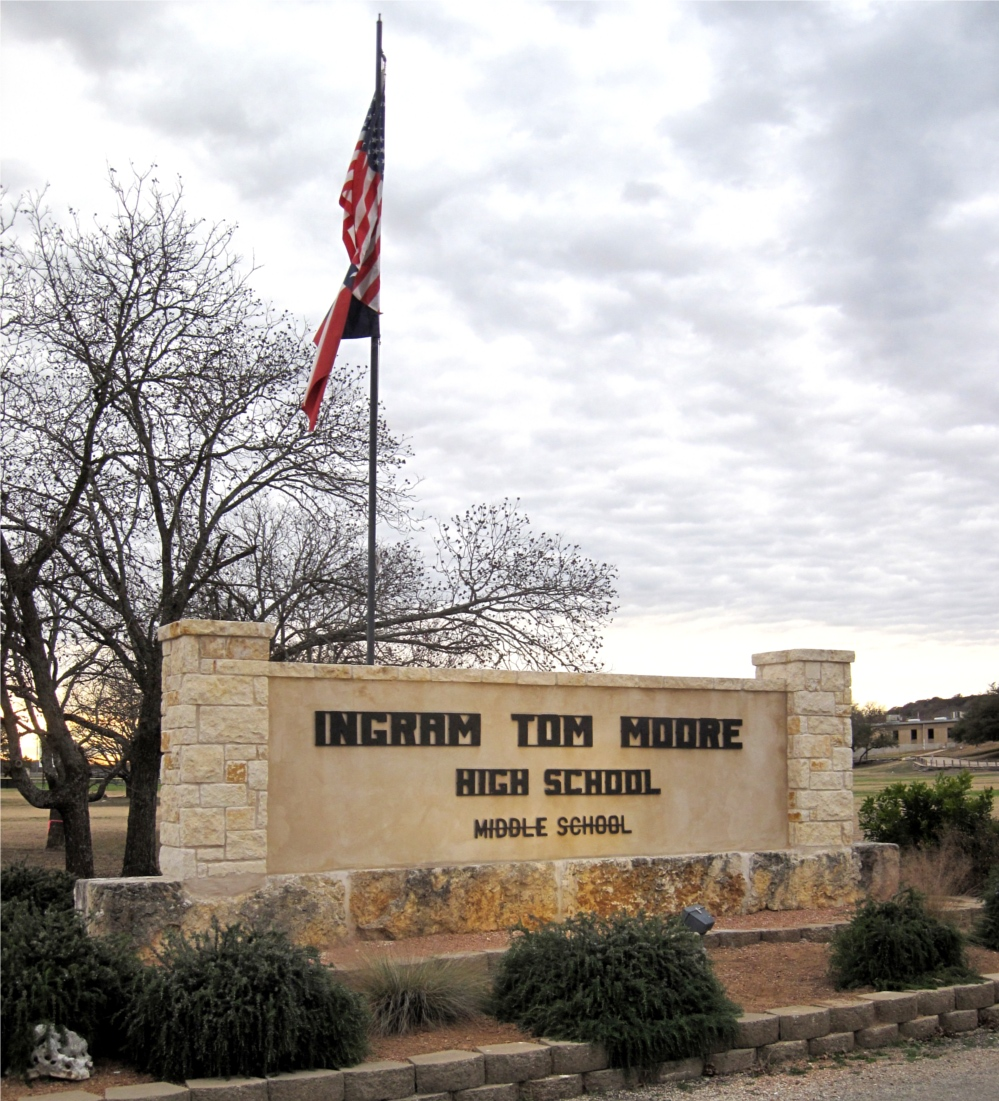
- The highway entrance to ITMHS

Location
- 510 College St; Ingram, Texas 78025; United States; 30°04′25″N 99°14′50″W

Information
- School type: Public high school
- Motto: Ingram Pride Inside
- Established: 1980; 46 years ago
- School district: Ingram Independent School District
- Principal: Justin Crittenden
- Teaching staff: 33.49 (on FTE basis)
- Grades: 9–12
- Enrollment: 423 (2023–2024)
- Student to teacher ratio: 12.63
- Colors: Red, black, and white
- Mascot: Warrior
- Website: itm.ingramisd.net

Ingram Tom Moore High School is a small public high school in Ingram, Texas, United states serving grades nine through twelve. It is the only high school in the Ingram Independent School District, and is attended by students from West Kerr County. Built in 1976, ITMHS opened in 1980 as the first school in west Kerr County and was named at the request of Tom Moore, who donated the land it rests on today.

As of the 2015 school year, the school has an enrollment of 451 students, which places Ingram in the 3A class when competing in University Interscholastic League (UIL). Ingram has been classified as a 3A school for the 2014 school year, and years following. The mascot is the Warrior and the colors are red, black, and white.

== History ==
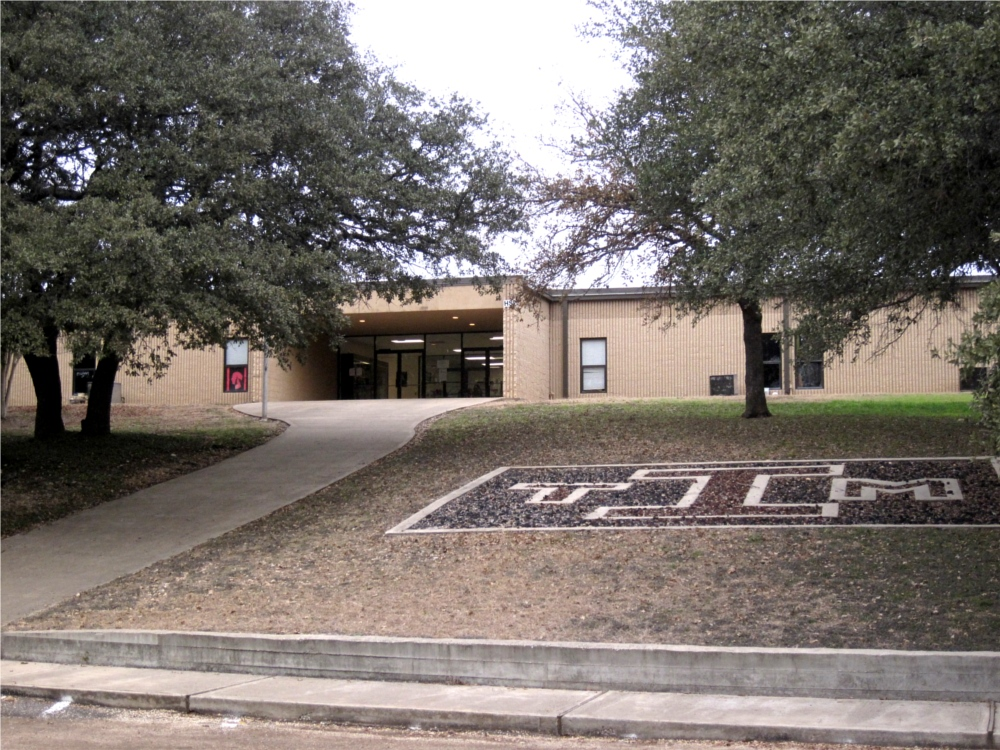
The school's main entrance to the original building, with the letters ITM (Ingram Tom Moore) clearly visible.

Although the main building (including the office and 16 classrooms) was constructed in 1976, it wasn't until 1980 that the first classes were held. When the school opened, the following words were etched in the foyer: "Ingram Moore High School [sic], established 1980, a student centered school in a student centered community where the standard of quality education will not be compromised." The school was named in honor of Tom Moore after the large land grant he provided.

== Academics and curriculum ==
In 2019, the Texas Education Agency awarded Ingram ISD an “A” rating for academic performance, the only one in the area. This, in large part, is due to the strong academic performance of Ingram Tom Moore High School.

The school is notable for offering a large number of AP classes for its size, with courses in English Language and Composition, English Literature and Composition, Government, Macroeconomics, U. S. History, Calculus AB, Physics B, Environmental Science, Biology, Art, Music, and Chemistry among others. Ingram Tom Moore High School is transitioning into an Early College High School beginning with the 2020-2021 school year. Currently Ingram Tom Moore High School Students are offered 42+ college hours, all free of charge.

== Extracurricular activities ==
=== Agricultural Science Department ===
Ingram Tom Moore High School is well-known for its AG department and FFA. The various teams that compete for the Ingram FFA have placed well in all levels of competition. Unlike other school competitions, FFA teams do not compete only against other 3-A teams; they compete against teams from schools of all sizes.

=== Band ===
The Warrior band is part of the musical program offered at Ingram ISD. The band currently has two year sweepstakes at UIL Region marching, multiple Area appearances, and one finalist title at Area. The band advanced to their first UIL Area competition in 40 years and earning their very first sweepstakes in school history during the 2019-2020 season. The band has also advanced to the UIL Area D competition and made finals the first time in school history, placing 5th out of the 17 bands there. The Warrior Band competes in Concert and Marching UIL Region 29 competition and ATSSB All-Region and State auditions for concert and jazz. The Warrior band also fields a Jazz Band called the Jazz Chieftains which performs a number of gigs every year.

=== Theatre ===
The Tom Moore Warrior Thespian troupe is housed in a 700 seat performing arts center. The Theatre Department has competed in UIL One Act Play over the years, earning awards over time:

2004-2005 – 1st in District, 1st in Area

2012-2013 – 3rd in District

2013-2014 – 2nd in District, 2nd in Area, 1st in Regional

2015-2016 – 2nd in District, 3rd in Bi-District, 2nd in Area

2016-2017 – 1st in District, 4th in Bi-District

2017-2018 – 2nd in District, 4th in Bi-District

2018-2019 – 2nd in District, 4th in Bi-District

2019-2020 – District (Advanced)

2020-2021 – 2nd in District, 3rd in Bi-District
