= Texas State Highway 39 =

State highway in Texas

State Highway 39

Route information
- Maintained by TxDOT
- Length: 35.273 mi (56.766 km)
- Existed: before 1939–present

Major junctions
- West end: US 83 west of Ingram
- East end: SH 27 in Ingram

Location
- Country: United States
- State: Texas
- Counties: Real, Kerr

Highway system
- Highways in Texas; Interstate; US; State; Former; Toll; Loops; Spurs; FM/RM; Park; Rec
| ← SH 38 | → I-40 |

State Highway 39 (SH 39) is a state highway that runs primarily through the Texas Hill Country primarily in Kerr County.

== History ==
Historic SH 39

On January 23, 1918, an intercounty highway was designated from Greenville to Decatur. On February 19, 1918, another intercounty highway from Pecos via Tahoka to Jayton was designated. On August 19, 1918, the Greenville-Decatur intercounty highway was extended to Cooper. SH 39 was originally proposed on January 21, 1919, as a route stretching from the Oklahoma state line north of Paris to New Mexico, partially along these intercounty highways. It was concurrent with SH 19 north of Cooper and with SH 18 west of Brownfield. On August 16, 1920, the section from McKinney to Decatur was cancelled and redesignated as an intercounty highway. On December 19, 1921, the section from McKinney to Decatur was restored. On August 21, 1923, its western terminus was moved to Jacksboro when the route west of Jacksboro had been renumbered as parts of SH 84, SH 18, and SH 24. Construction had begun. The entire route had been renumbered as a part of SH 24 on June 24, 1931.

Historic SH 39

On September 23, 1931, a designation on a proposed route from Medina to just north of Leakey was planned (but not designated yet). On April 6, 1932, the proposed route was officially designated as SH 39. On July 15, 1935, SH 39 was cancelled. On February 18, 1936, it was designated on its present-day route. On July 9, 1970, a proposed extension to I-10 was added, but this has not been constructed.

== Junction list ==
| County | Location | mi | km | Destinations | Notes |
|---|---|---|---|---|---|
| Real | | 0.0 | 0.0 | US 83 – Leakey, Junction | Western terminus |
| Kerr | | 8.9 | 14.3 | RM 187 south – Vanderpool, Lost Maples State Natural Area | |
| Kerr | Hunt | 29.0 | 46.7 | FM 1340 north to SH 41 | |
| Kerr | Ingram | 35.2 | 56.6 | SH 27 – Kerrville, Mountain Home | Eastern terminus |
1.000 mi = 1.609 km; 1.000 km = 0.621 mi
