= Texas State Highway 41 =

State highway in Texas

State Highway 41

Route information
- Maintained by TxDOT
- Length: 50.5 mi (81.3 km)
- Existed: 1919–present

Major junctions
- West end: US 377 near Rocksprings
- US 83
- East end: I-10 near Mountain Home

Location
- Country: United States
- State: Texas

Highway system
- Highways in Texas; Interstate; US; State; Former; Toll; Loops; Spurs; FM/RM; Park; Rec
← SH 40	→ SH 42

State Highway 41 (SH 41) is a state highway that runs through the Texas Hill Country in Kerr, Real, and Edwards Counties.

== History ==
Historic SH 41

SH 41 was proposed on April 22, 1919 as a route from north of Del Rio to Boerne via Rocksprings and Kerrville. On August 21, 1923, the designation was truncated to Mountain Home, with the section east of Mountain Home being transferred to SH 27. On May 23, 1951, the western section was transferred to U.S. Highway 377, shortening the route to its present length. On May 1, 1972, SH 41 was extended from SH 27 to I-10.

== Major intersections ==
County	Location	mi	km	Destinations	Notes
Edwards		0.0	0.0	US 377 – Rocksprings, Junction	Western terminus
Edwards		4.3	6.9	RM 335 south – Barksdale	
Real		17.9	28.8	RM 336 south – Leakey	
Real		27.0	43.5	US 83 – Junction, Leakey	
Kerr		34.9	56.2	FM 1340 south – Hunt	
Kerr	Mountain Home	48.4	77.9	SH 27 – Ingram	
Kerr		50.5	81.3	I-10 – Junction, Kerrville	Eastern terminus; I-10 exit 490
1.000 mi = 1.609 km; 1.000 km = 0.621 mi
