= Texas State Highway Loop 98 =

State highway in Texas

State Highway Loop 98

Route information
- Maintained by TxDOT
- Length: 3.4 mi (5.5 km)
- Existed: 2010–present

Major junctions
- West end: FM 1338 in Kerrville
- SH 27 in Kerrville
- East end: SH 16 in Kerrville

Location
- Country: United States
- State: Texas
- Counties: Kerr

Highway system
- Highways in Texas; Interstate; US; State; Former; Toll; Loops; Spurs; FM/RM; Park; Rec
← Spur 97	→ Loop 100

State Highway Loop 98 (Loop 98) is a state highway loop in Kerrville, Texas, in the Texas Hill Country. It runs 3.4 miles (5.5 km) from Farm to Market Road 1338 (FM 1338) to State Highway 16 (SH 16). Loop 98 was established in 2010 as a redesignation of Spur 98.

== Route description ==
Loop 98 begins at an intersection with FM 1338 on the west side of Kerrville. The route travels southwest to an intersection with SH 27 (Junction Highway), followed by a bridge over the Guadalupe River. Shortly after the Guadalupe, the road turns southeast along Thompson Drive. The route eventually turns east, reaching an intersection with FM 394 (Francisco Lemos Street) near Peterson Regional Medical Center. The route then passes First United Methodist Church and Louise Hays Park, before turning southeast and reaching its eastern terminus at SH 16 (Sidney Baker Street) near River Hills Mall.

== History ==
Loop 98 was designated on May 9, 1940, as Spur 98, a replacement for SH 248. On March 27, 1978, Spur 98 was extended northwest 1.3 miles (2.1 km). Spur 98 was extended west and north 1.2 miles (1.9 km) and redesignated as Loop 98 on April 29, 2010.

== Major intersections ==
The entire route is in Kerrville, Kerr County.

mi	km	Destinations	Notes
0.0	0.0	FM 1338 (Goat Creek Road)	Western terminus
0.2	0.32	SH 27 (Junction Highway)	
0.4	0.64	Bridge over the Guadalupe River	
2.8	4.5	FM 394 north (Francisco Lemos Street)	Southern terminus of FM 394
3.4	5.5	SH 16 (Sidney Baker Street)	Eastern terminus
1.000 mi = 1.609 km; 1.000 km = 0.621 mi
