= Stonehenge II =

Public sculpture in Texas

Coordinates: 30°04.3375′N 99°14.898′W

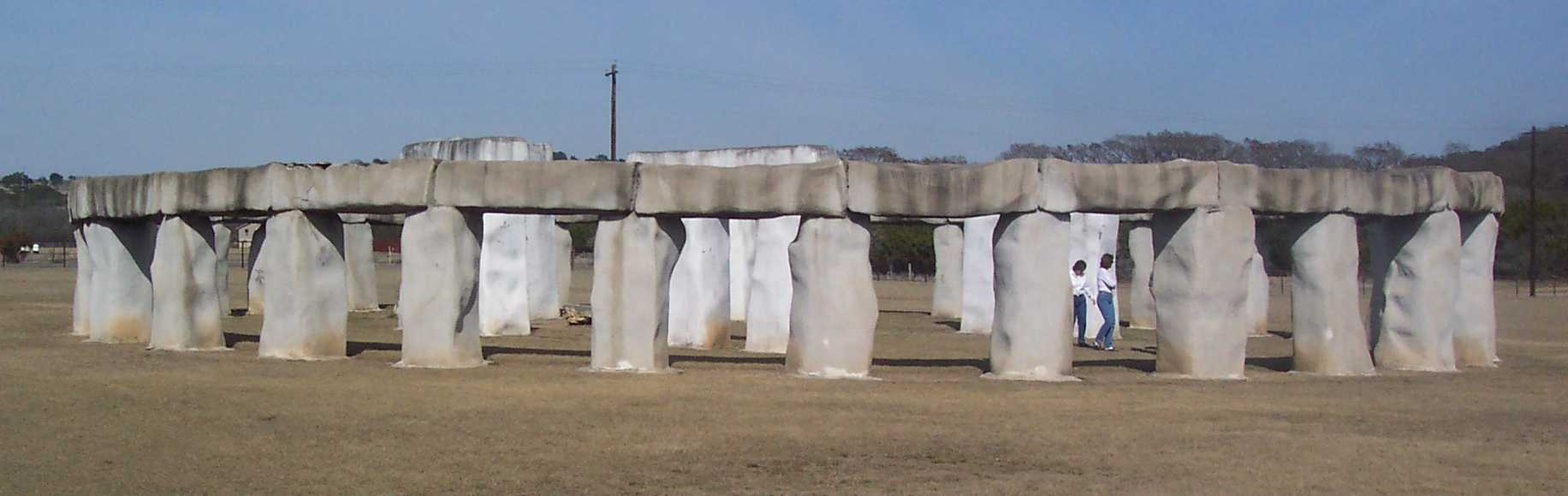
View of Stonehenge II in its original location in Hunt, Texas

Stonehenge II is a concrete sculpture in the Texas Hill Country, US, built in homage to the original Stonehenge monument. Stonehenge II was conceived by Al Shepperd and built with the help of his friend and neighbor, Doug Hill. Originally located on FM 1340 west of Hunt, Texas, Stonehenge II now resides on the campus of the Hill Country Arts Foundation in Ingram, Texas (78025).

According to the signage at the site: "Stonehenge II is not a replica; it is about 2/3 the size of the original, and it is not oriented to the sun, as is the original. Rather, it is Hill's impression, in steel and concrete, of the nearly 5,000 year old circle of stones on the Salisbury Plain."

In addition to the constructed and real stones comprising the monument, there are also two fabricated Moai, or Easter Island (Rapa Nui/Isla de Pascua) statues located at the Hill Country Arts Foundation. These imitation Moai are made of the same material as the Stonehenge II stones.

== Creation of Stonehenge II ==
The first stone for the project was a piece of limestone left over from a building project. Most of the stones are constructed of plaster applied to a wire mesh frame; however, two of the central stones are real, large, and probably unmovable without heavy equipment.

== Relocation effort ==
In the summer of 2010, Al Shepperd began searching for a new home for Stonehenge II after putting his land in Hunt, Texas up for sale. The Hill Country Arts Foundation agreed to offer a new location for the project, and started a 'Save Stonehenge II' campaign to raise the necessary funds to cover the costs of moving, repairing, and rebuilding the monument in a new location in Ingram, Texas. By December 2010, the stones and statues were moved to the new site, but not reconstructed.

By 2011, the Hill Country Arts Foundation had raised the necessary funds to move the monument and statues to its new home on Foundation property near the Point Theater in Ingram.

== The site today ==
The new location of Stonehenge II was directly in the path of the April 8, 2024 total solar eclipse. The duration of the eclipse was predicted to last for 4 minutes 26 seconds. Unfortunately the weather that day was cloudy and stormy, but the eclipse was occasionally visible through the clouds. Future plans for Stonehenge II include the addition of a dance floor, benches, and sidewalks to the site.

== In popular culture ==
Stonehenge II was featured as a backdrop for a scene in an early episode of the NBC TV series Friday Night Lights (Episode 19: "Ch-Ch-Ch-Ch-Changes").

== See also ==
- Stonehenge replicas and derivatives
