= Kerr County, Texas =

County in Texas, United States

- County
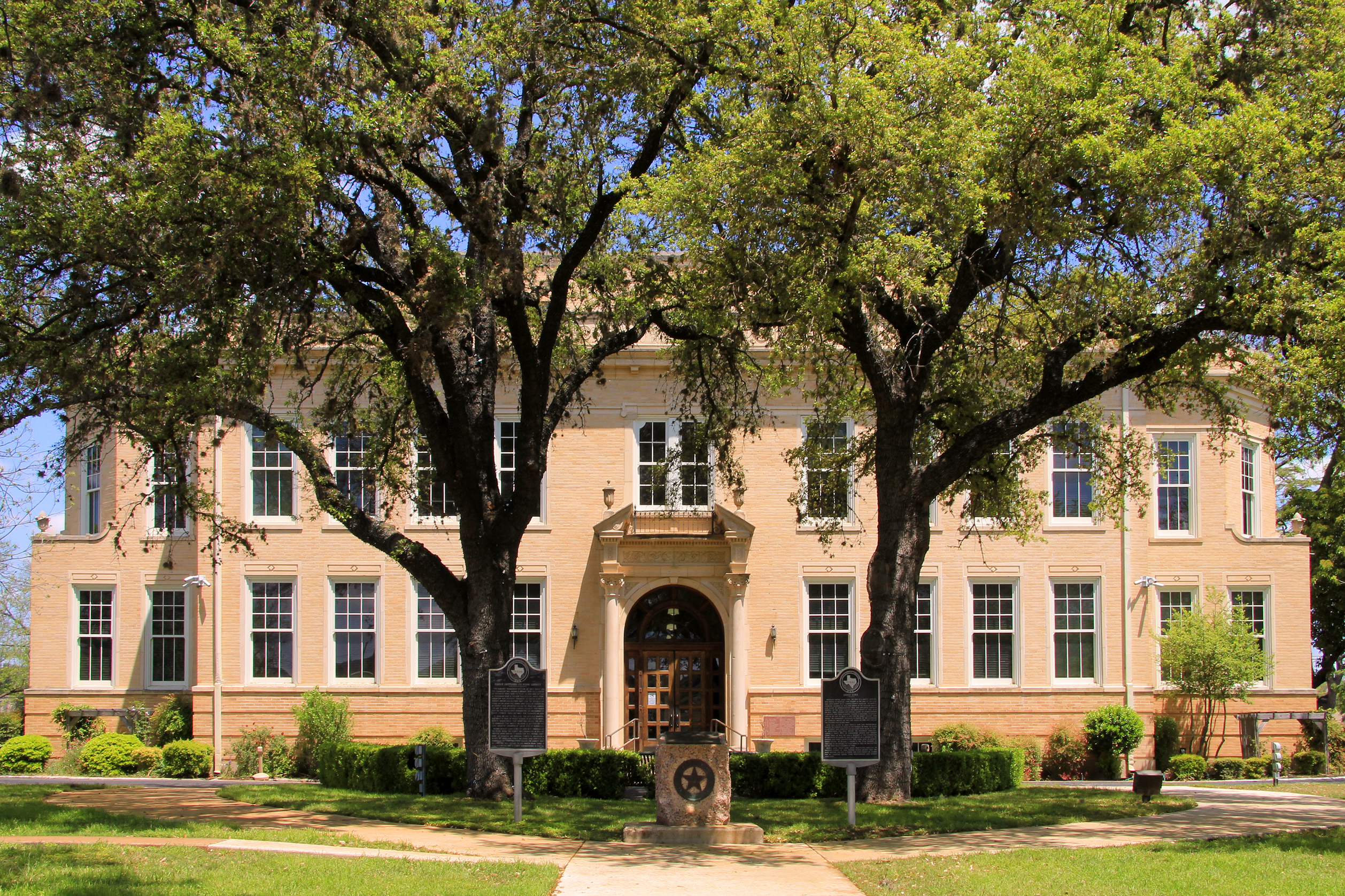
- Kerr County Courthouse, southside view

- Location within the U.S. state of Texas
- Coordinates: 30.059953°N 99.353339°W
- Country: United States
- State: Texas
- Founded: January 26, 1856 (created); March 1856 (organized)
- Named for: James Kerr
- Seat: Kerrville
- Largest city: Kerrville

Area
  - Total: 1,107.283 sq mi (2,867.85 km^{2})
  - Land: 1,103.333 sq mi (2,857.62 km^{2})
  - Water: 3.950 sq mi (10.23 km^{2}) 0.36%

Population (2020)
  - Total: 52,598
  - Estimate (2025): 54,037 ▲
  - Density: 48.847/sq mi (18.860/km^{2})
- Time zone: UTC−6 (Central)
  - Summer (DST): UTC−5 (CDT)
- Area code: 830
- Congressional district: 21st
- Website: www.kerrcountytx.gov

Kerr County (/kɜːr/ KUR) is a county located on the Edwards Plateau in the U.S. state of Texas. As of the 2020 census, its population was 52,598, and it was estimated to be 54,037 in 2025. The county seat and the largest city is Kerrville. The county was named by Joshua D. Brown for his fellow Kentucky native James Kerr, a congressman of the Republic of Texas. The Kerrville, Texas micropolitan statistical area includes all of Kerr County.

== History ==
Around 8000 BC, early Native American inhabitants arrived in the area, with numerous successive cultures following in prehistoric times. Historic tribes encountered by Europeans included the Kiowa, Comanche, and Lipan Apache.

In 1842, the Adelsverein Fisher–Miller Land Grant set aside 3,000,000 acres (1,200,000 ha) to settle 600 families and single men of German, Dutch, Swiss, Danish, Swedish, and Norwegian ancestry in Texas. Henry Francis Fisher sold his interest in the land grant to the Adelsverein in 1844.

In 1845, Prince Carl of Solms-Braunfels secured the title to 1,265 acres (512 ha) of the Veramendi grant, including the Comal Springs and River, for the Adelsverein. Thousands of German immigrants were stranded at port of disembarkation, Indianola on Matagorda Bay. With no food or shelter, living in holes dug into the ground, an estimated 50% died from disease or starvation. Joshua Brown, in 1846, became the first settler.

The Texas State Convention of Germans met in San Antonio on May 14–15, 1854, and adopted a political, social, and religious platform, including: 1) Equal pay for equal work, 2) Direct election of the President of the United States, 3) Abolition of capital punishment, 4) “Slavery is an evil, the abolition of which is a requirement of democratic principles..”, 5) Free schools – including universities – supported by the state, without religious influence, and 6) Total separation of church and state. The next year, United States Army post Camp Verde was established. Kerr County was formed in 1856 from Bexar Land District Number 2. Joshua Brown donated the land that became Kerrville, and had it named for his friend James Kerr. Kerrville was named the county seat. The U.S. Camel Corps, headquartered at Verde, was the brainchild of United States Secretary of War (1853–57) Jefferson Davis. Center Point was established in 1859.

In 1860–1861, the county population was 634, including 49 slaves. The Sons of Hermann lodge, for descendants of German heritage, was established in the county. The lodge is named for German chieftain folk hero Hermann the Cherusker. A bitterly divided Kerr County voted 76–57 in 1861 for secession from the Union, with most German residents being against it. Unionists from Kerr, Gillespie, and Kendall Counties participated in the formation of the Union League, an organization which supported president Abraham Lincoln's policies. The Union League formed companies to protect the frontier against Indians and their families against local Confederate forces. Conscientious objectors to the military draft were primarily among Tejanos and Germans. Confederate authorities imposed martial law on Central Texas. The Nueces massacre occurred in Kinney County. Jacob Kuechler served as a guide for 61 conscientious objectors attempting to flee to Mexico. Scottish-born Confederate irregular James Duff and his Duff's Partisan Rangers pursued and overtook them at the Nueces River; 34 were killed, some executed after being taken prisoner. Jacob Kuechler survived the battle. The cruelty shocked the people of Gillespie County. About 2,000 took to the hills to escape Duff's reign of terror. Spring Creek Cemetery near Harper in Gillespie County has a singular grave with the names Sebird Henderson, Hiram Nelson, Gus Tegener, and Frank Scott. The inscription reads, “Hanged and thrown in Spring Creek by Col. James Duff’s Confederate Regiment.”

The Treue der Union Monument ("Loyalty to the Union") in Comfort was dedicated to the Texans slain at the Nueces massacre August 10, 1866. It is the only monument to the Union outside of the National Cemeteries on Confederate territory, and is one of only six such sites allowed to fly the United States flag at half mast in perpetuity. The Y O Ranch was founded in 1880 by Charles Armand Schreiner, who had opened a store in the area in 1869.

In 1876, Lipan Apaches raided near Center Point in one of the last raids made by Native Americans in the county.

On October 5, 1878, the last Indian raid in the county occurred at the present-day community of Mountain Home, when four children of the Dowdy family were murdered by either Kickapoos or Lipan Apaches.

In 1887, the San Antonio and Aransas Pass Railway was built through Kerrville. The American Legion of Texas established what eventually was called the Veterans Affairs Medical Center, Kerrville, in 1919.

The Schreiner Institute was established in Kerrville from 1917 to 1923. In 1926, Ora Johnson established Camp Waldemar Christian girls camp in Hunt.

Mooney Aircraft was established in 1929 in Kerrville. Kerrville was begun to be called the "Mohair Capital of the World" in 1930. The Sid Peterson Memorial Hospital was completed in 1949.

Kerrville State Hospital opened in 1951.

=== 2025 Central Texas floods ===
During the 2025 Independence Day weekend, the county was affected by catastrophic flash flooding after more than 20 inches of rain rapidly fell in and around Kerr County. Numerous flash flood emergencies were issued in Kerr County along the Guadalupe River. According to local authorities, at least 107 people in Kerr County died in the flooding, which killed at least 135 people overall (as of July 19).

== Geography ==
According to the United States Census Bureau, the county has a total area of 1,107.283 square miles (2,867.85 km^{2}), of which 3.950 sq mi (10.23 km^{2}) (0.36%) are covered by water. It is the 48th largest county in Texas by total area.

=== Major highways ===
- Interstate 10
- U.S. Highway 83
- U.S. Highway 87
- State Highway 16
- State Highway 27
- State Highway 39
- State Highway 41
- State Highway 173
- Loop 98
- Loop 534
- Spur 100
- Spur 535

=== Adjacent counties ===
- Kimble County (north)
- Gillespie County (northeast)
- Kendall County (east)
- Bandera County (south)
- Real County (southwest)
- Edwards County (west)

== Demographics ==
Historical population
Census	Pop.	Note	%±
1860	634		—
1870	1,042		64.4%
1880	2,168		108.1%
1890	4,462		105.8%
1900	4,980		11.6%
1910	5,505		10.5%
1920	5,842		6.1%
1930	10,151		73.8%
1940	11,650		14.8%
1950	14,022		20.4%
1960	16,800		19.8%
1970	19,454		15.8%
1980	28,780		47.9%
1990	36,304		26.1%
2000	43,653		20.2%
2010	49,625		13.7%
2020	52,598		6.0%
2025 (est.)	54,037	▲	2.7%
U.S. Decennial Census; 1790–1960 1900–1990; 1990–2000 2010–2020

As of the fourth quarter of 2024, the median home value in Kerr County was $298,747.

As of the 2023 American Community Survey, 22,267 estimated households were in Kerr County, with an average of 2.29 persons per household. The county has a median household income of $67,927. Around 12.0% of the county's population lived at or below the poverty line. Kerr County had an estimated 54.4% employment rate, with 31.2% of the population holding a bachelor's degree or higher and 90.3% holding a high-school diploma.

The top five reported ancestries (people were allowed to report up to two ancestries, thus the figures generally add to more than 100%) were English (86.3%), Spanish (12.4%), Indo-European (0.7%), Asian and Pacific Islander (0.3%), and other (0.2%).

The median age in the county was 48.6 years.

Kerr County, Texas – racial and ethnic composition
Note: the US Census treats Hispanic/Latino as an ethnic category. This table excludes Latinos from the racial categories and assigns them to a separate category. Hispanics/Latinos may be of any race.

Race / ethnicity (NH = non-Hispanic)	Pop. 1980	Pop. 1990	Pop. 2000	Pop. 2010	Pop. 2020
White alone (NH)	23,993 (83.37%)	29,303 (80.72%)	33,802 (77.43%)	35,851 (72.24%)	35,791 (68.05%)
Black or African American alone (NH)	741 (2.57%)	752 (2.07%)	738 (1.69%)	739 (1.49%)	690 (1.31%)
Native American or Alaska Native alone (NH)	62 (0.22%)	104 (0.29%)	154 (0.35%)	207 (0.42)	156 (0.30)
Asian alone (NH)	66 (0.23%)	128 (0.35%)	212 (0.49%)	361 (0.73%)	576 (1.10%)
Pacific Islander alone (NH)	—	—	16 (0.04%)	19 (0.04)	39 (0.07)
Other race alone (NH)	40 (0.14%)	23 (0.06%)	12 (0.03%)	38 (0.08%)	187 (0.36%)
Mixed race or multiracial (NH)	—	—	366 (0.84%)	515 (1.04%)	1,561 (2.97%)
Hispanic or Latino (any race)	3,878 (13.47%)	5,994 (16.51%)	8,353 (19.13%)	11,895 (23.97%)	13,598 (25.85%)
Total	28,780 (100.00%)	36,304 (100.00%)	43,653 (100.00%)	49,625 (100.00%)	52,598 (100.00%)

=== 2024 estimate ===
As of the 2024 estimate, 53,900 people and 22,267 households were residing in the county. The population density was 48.85 inhabitants per square mile (18.9/km^{2}). The 26,122 housing units had an average density of 23.68 per square mile (9.1/km^{2}). The racial makeup of the county was 92.9% White, 2.2% African American, 1.3% Native American, 1.5% Asian, 0.1% Pacific Islander, and 2.0% from two or more races. Hispanic or Latino people of any race were 27.6% of the population.

=== 2020 census ===
As of the 2020 census, 52,598 people, 22,060 households, and 14,302 families resided in the county, and the median age was 50.6 years. About 17.7% of residents were under 18 and 30.3% were 65 or older. For every 100 females, there were 94.3 males, and for every 100 females 18 and over, there were 92.1 males 18 and over.

The population density was 47.67 inhabitants per square mile (18.4/km^{2}). The 25,200 housing units had an average density of 22.84 per square mile (8.8/km^{2}); 12.5% of the units were vacant, 71.8% of occupied units were owner-occupied, and 28.2% were renter-occupied. The homeowner vacancy rate was 1.8% and the rental vacancy rate was 8.7%.

Of the 22,060 households, 22.6% had children under 18 living in them, 49.7% were married-couple households, 17.5% were households with a male householder and no spouse or partner present, and 27.6% were households with a female householder and no spouse or partner present. About 30.2% of all households were made up of individuals, and 17.9% had someone living alone who was 65 or older.

The racial makeup of the county was 75.5% White, 1.5% Black or African American, 0.6% American Indian and Alaska Native, 1.2% Asian, 0.1% Native Hawaiian and Pacific Islander, 7.2% from some other race, and 13.9% from two or more races. Hispanic or Latino residents of any race comprised 25.9% of the population.

About 60.5% of residents lived in urban areas, while 39.5% lived in rural areas.

=== 2010 census ===
As of the 2010 census, 49,625 people and 20,550 households lived in the county. The population density was 44.98 inhabitants per square mile (17.4/km^{2}). The 23,831 housing units had an average density of 21.60 per square mile (8.3/km^{2}). The racial makeup of the county was 87.67% White, 1.78% African American, 0.72% Native American, 0.75% Asian, 0.06% Pacific Islander, 6.89% from some other races, and 2.13% from two or more races. Hispanic or Latino people of any race were 23.97% of the population.

=== 2000 census ===
As of the 2000 census, 43,653 people, 17,813 households, and 12,308 families lived in the county. The population density was 40.0 inhabitants per square mile (15.4/km^{2}). The 20,228 housing units had an average density of 18.0 per square mile (6.9/km^{2}). The racial makeup of the county was 88.89% White, 1.78% African American, 0.56% Native American, 0.51% Asian, 0.05% Pacific Islander, 6.60% from some other races, and 1.62% from two or more races. Hispanic or Latino people of any race were 19.13% of the population.

Of the 17,813 households, 25.5% had children under 18 living with them, 56.8% were married couples living together, 9.2% had a female householder with no husband present, and 30.9% were not families. About 27.5% of all households were made up of individuals, and 15.0% had someone living alone who was 65 or older. The average household size was 2.35, and the average family size was 2.84.

In the county, the age distribution was 22.7% under 18, 6.7% from 18 to 24, 22.2% from 25 to 44, 23.5% from 45 to 64, and 24.9% who were 65 or older. The median age was 44 years. For every 100 females, there were 92.0 males. For every 100 females 18 and over, there were 87.8 males.

The median income in the county for a household was $34,283 and for a family was $40,713. Males had a median income of $27,425 versus $21,149 for females. The per capita income for the county was $19,767. About 10.3% of families and 14.5% of the population were below the poverty line, including 21.6% of those under 18 and 8.4% of those 65 or over.

== Communities ==
=== Cities ===
- Ingram
- Kerrville (county seat)

=== Census-designated place ===
- Center Point

=== Unincorporated communities ===
- Camp Verde
- Hunt
- Mountain Home

== Education ==
School districts include:

- Center Point Independent School District
- Comfort Independent School District
- Divide Independent School District
- Harper Independent School District
- Hunt Independent School District
- Ingram Independent School District
- Kerrville Independent School District
- Medina Independent School District

All of the county is in the service area of Alamo Community College District.

== In popular culture ==
- 1963 Hud starring Paul Newman was filmed at Camp Waldemar in Hunt.
- 1972 The first Kerrville Folk Festival was held.
- 1975 The Great Waldo Pepper starring Robert Redford was filmed in Kerrville.
- 2005 Stonehenge II, a scaled replica of the famous British attraction, was featured in the book "Weird Texas."
- 2016 TV show, Lethal Weapon, Martin Riggs grew up in Kerr County, Texas.
- 2020 TV show, 911: Lone Star, Owen Strand moves to Kerr County, Texas in Season 3.

== Politics ==
United States presidential election results for Kerr County, Texas
Year	Republican		Democratic		Third party(ies)	
Year	No.	%	No.	%	No.	%
1912	126	14.14%	577	64.76%	188	21.10%
1916	272	29.34%	621	66.99%	34	3.67%
1920	464	40.38%	612	53.26%	73	6.35%
1924	892	49.31%	735	40.63%	182	10.06%
1928	1,575	73.36%	570	26.55%	2	0.09%
1932	623	22.22%	2,165	77.21%	16	0.57%
1936	994	38.39%	1,586	61.26%	9	0.35%
1940	1,112	40.35%	1,634	59.29%	10	0.36%
1944	1,358	46.14%	1,377	46.79%	208	7.07%
1948	1,520	47.44%	1,505	46.97%	179	5.59%
1952	3,683	73.24%	1,337	26.59%	9	0.18%
1956	3,555	77.38%	1,025	22.31%	14	0.30%
1960	3,252	70.76%	1,323	28.79%	21	0.46%
1964	2,706	48.25%	2,894	51.60%	8	0.14%
1968	3,692	55.58%	1,878	28.27%	1,073	16.15%
1972	6,039	77.82%	1,511	19.47%	210	2.71%
1976	6,021	60.34%	3,767	37.75%	190	1.90%
1980	9,090	70.71%	3,387	26.35%	378	2.94%
1984	11,829	79.00%	3,102	20.72%	43	0.29%
1988	11,207	75.03%	3,587	24.01%	143	0.96%
1992	8,787	53.72%	3,707	22.66%	3,864	23.62%
1996	11,173	66.61%	4,192	24.99%	1,410	8.41%
2000	14,637	76.12%	4,002	20.81%	589	3.06%
2004	16,538	77.84%	4,557	21.45%	151	0.71%
2008	16,752	74.27%	5,570	24.69%	234	1.04%
2012	17,274	78.95%	4,338	19.83%	267	1.22%
2016	17,727	76.09%	4,681	20.09%	889	3.82%
2020	20,879	75.25%	6,524	23.51%	342	1.23%
2024	21,615	76.73%	6,315	22.42%	240	0.85%

United States Senate election results for Kerr County, Texas
Year	Republican		Democratic		Third party(ies)	
Year	No.	%	No.	%	No.	%
2024	20,840	74.11%	6,672	23.73%	610	2.17%

United States Senate election results for Kerr County, Texas2
Year	Republican		Democratic		Third party(ies)	
Year	No.	%	No.	%	No.	%
2020	21,022	76.32%	5,946	21.59%	575	2.09%

Texas Gubernatorial election results for Kerr County
Year	Republican		Democratic		Third party(ies)	
Year	No.	%	No.	%	No.	%
2022	17,524	77.95%	4,648	20.68%	308	1.37%

Kerr County has given the majority of its votes to Republican candidates in the majority of presidential elections since 1924. The only Democratic Party candidates to carry the county since then have been Franklin D. Roosevelt, with diminishing margins in each of his four electoral victories, and Texan Lyndon B. Johnson, winning by a narrow margin despite the 1964 election being a national landslide victory.

== See also ==
- Adelsverein
- Texas Germans
- List of museums in Central Texas
- National Register of Historic Places listings in Kerr County, Texas
- Recorded Texas Historic Landmarks in Kerr County
- Capt. Charles Schreiner Mansion
- Mo Ranch
- July 2025 Central Texas floods
