= Hunt Independent School District =

School district in Texas, United States

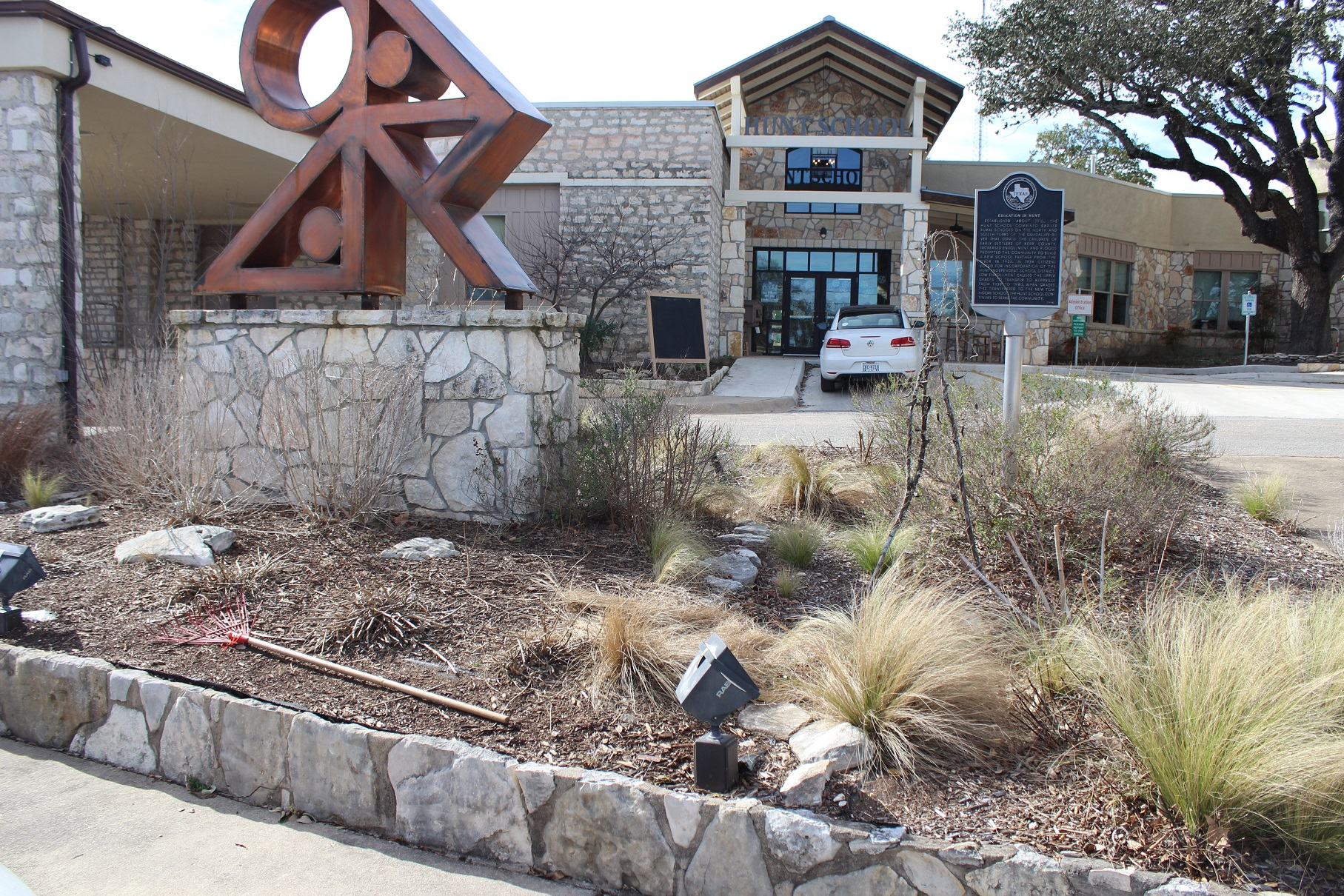
Hunt School

Hunt Independent School District is a public school district based in the community of Hunt, Texas (USA).

The district has one school that serves students in grades pre-kindergarten through eight. High school students attend Ingram Tom Moore High School in the Ingram Independent School District.

In 2009, the school district was rated "recognized" by the Texas Education Agency.
