= Mo Ranch =

Presbyterian conference center near Hunt, Texas

Coordinates: 30.058425°N 99.474077°W

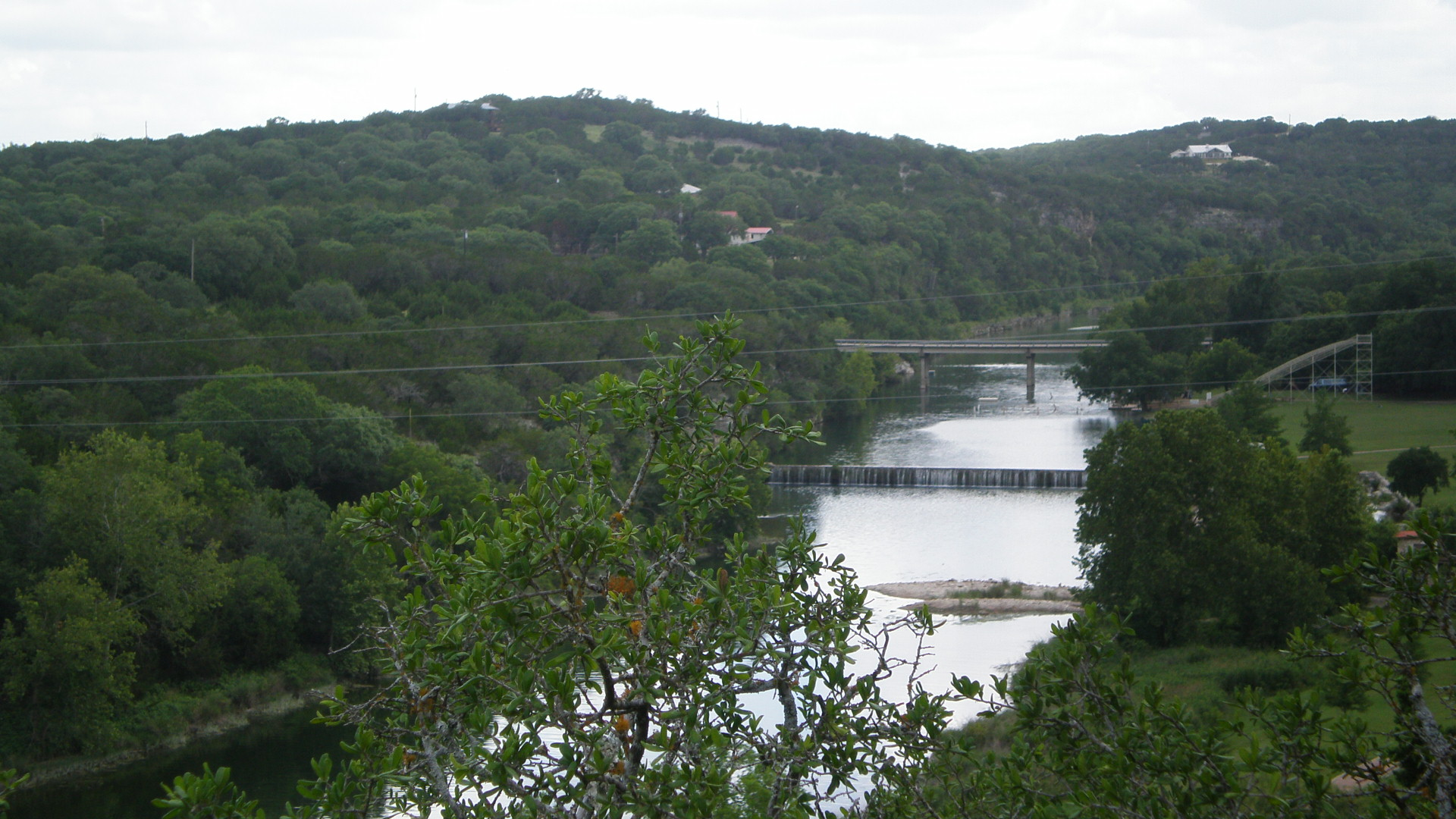
View from the Chapel on the Hill at Mo Ranch.

Mo Ranch is a Presbyterian conference center for summer camps, retreats, family reunions that is located in unincorporated Kerr County, Texas. It is in a west-central area in the county, 10 miles (16 km) west of Hunt, Texas, in the Hill Country at the North Fork of the Guadalupe River.

== History ==
The Ranch is named for Daniel J. Moran, who was chairman of Continental Oil Company (later to become Conoco, Inc.). He owned the 6,871-acre (27.81 km^{2}) ranch from 1935 until his death in 1948. Presbyterians purchased the ranch in 1949, the year after his death, for $562,500. Mrs. Moran then gave a gift back to the church of $50,000. Eventually the State of Texas bought 6,500 acres (26 km^{2}) of the ranch from the Presbyterians, and later expanded that portion with additional purchase of adjacent land. That land is now the Kerr County Wildlife Management Area, administered by Texas Parks & Wildlife. Now the entire Mo-Ranch covers 500 acres (2.0 km^{2}).

By 2019 the Mo Ranch camp organization began doing off-site camping programs in the Rio Grande Valley region; historically many residents there chose not to travel to Kerr County for the camp as some members of families lacked immigration visas and therefore could be detained at in-country immigration checkpoints set up in the region. Mo Ranch was hit by significant flooding along the Guadalupe River in July 2025, alongside many other camps along the river; no deaths were reported from the camp.
