= Mountain Home, Texas =

- Unincorporated community
- Location within Texas Location within the United States
- Coordinates: 30°10′27″N 99°22′37″W
- Country: United States
- State: Texas
- County: Kerr
- Elevation: 1,910 ft (580 m)
- Time zone: UTC-6 (CST)
  - Summer (DST): UTC-5 (CDT)
- Area code: 830
- FIPS code: 48-49620
- GNIS ID: 1342167

Mountain Home is an unincorporated community in Kerr County, Texas, United States, at the intersection of State Hwy 27 and State Hwy 41. Mountain Home has a post office with the ZIP code 78058.

== History ==
The community area was the site of an 1878 Indian raid, in which four settlers, all children, were killed.

The first Mountain Home post office was established in 1879, with Hiram L Nelson as the first Postmaster.

The Texas Parks and Wildlife Department Fisheries Research Station opened on Highway 27 in 1925.

The Texas Catholic Boys Camp was started in Mountain Home in 1951 by the Society of Mary.

== Education ==
Divide Independent School District is the local school district for elementary school. Divide ISD feeds into Ingram Independent School District, which provides secondary education.
