= Ingram Independent School District =

School district in Texas, United States

Address
- 170 Tomahawk Trail W, Ingram, TX 78025 510 College Street; Ingram, TX 78025 Kerr County, Texas Ingram, Texas, 78025; United States

District information
- Type: Public School District
- Motto: Inspiring student success from the inside out!
- Grades: Pre-K – 12
- Established: 1936
- Superintendent: Dr. Justin Turner
- Accreditations: Texas Education Agency; United States Department of Education
- Schools: Tom Moore High School; Ingram Middle School; Ingram Elementary School

Students and staff
- Students: 1,348
- Teachers: 88
- Staff: 188
- Student–teacher ratio: 14:1
- Athletic conference: District 13-3A

Other information
- 2019 Accountability Rating: A- Exemplary Performance
- Website: www.ingramisd.net

Ingram Independent School District is a public school district based in Ingram, Texas, United States. The first school building opened in 1936. Ingram ISD has grown into a three-campus district providing education for the citizens of Ingram (and the surrounding communities), a population of approximately 1,917.

Ingram's Secondary campus accommodates Ingram residents as well as middle and high school-aged residents from Divide Independent School District, and Hunt Independent School District.

Ingram ISD has an open transfer policy, allowing students from across the Texas Hill Country to enroll without an attendance fee. Since the 2012–2013 school year, transfer rates from neighboring districts have increased from 9% to 15%, thanks to changes made with support from district leaders. The secondary campus has enhanced its curriculum by adding AP, Dual Credit, and OnRamps courses, along with the AVID program to aid in early college transitions. In the summer of 2019, staff from select middle and high school campuses participated in rigorous training to effectively implement AVID, which stands for Advancement Via Individual Determination, focusing on college and career readiness skills for students.

== History ==
Ingram ISD has an overall rating of 91%, "A", for 2024-2025 on the Texas Schools website.

== School Board ==
The Ingram ISD Board of Trustees consists of seven members elected by the public to serve overlapping three-year terms. Elections are held annually in May. Candidates do not represent specific geographical areas. Each represents Ingram ISD as a whole. Following the annual election, the Board elects officers (president, vice president and secretary) to serve one-year terms.

== Superintendents ==
- Dr. Justin Turner - 2026-Present
- Dr. Robert Templeton – Jan. 2013–2025
- James D. Stroeder - 2010-2012
- Prior to 2010: Bruce Faust, Susan Haynie, and Carol Moffet.

== School Safety ==
“ATTENTION. Please be aware that staff members at Ingram ISD are armed and may use whatever force is necessary to protect our students,” as Sue Calberg of Kens 5 News reported September 5, 2018.

Starting the 2018–2019 school year, Ingram ISD posted the above signage, after district members invested summer time in specialized training that includes law, first aid, and crisis intervention. The district marshals were approved by the board to ensure student safety due to the increasing number of school tragedies that have occurred over the past years. Dr. Templeton and board members wanted to add an extra layer of protection. Weapons are not visible, and everything is concealed. The identities of the school marshals are unknown to the public. The community has commented on public social media forums with positive support of the district's program. The only visible changes are the signs posted at the entrance of both the elementary and secondary campus. During the 2019–2020 school year, the district implemented mandatory district staff training for Standard Response Protocol k-12 and Stop The Bleed. The district administration and local emergency responders have collaborated to organize a reunification protocol, in case of an emergency that would require evacuation of the campus. Ingram ISD will continue efforts to prepare and train staff and students for possible scenarios that could occur.

== Demographics ==
The demographic breakdown of the 1,348 students for the 2024-2025 school year was:

- African American: 0.5%
- Hispanic: 47.1%
- White: 49.7%
- Native American: 0.1%
- Asian/Pacific Islander: 0.5%
- Multiracial: 2.1%

The demographic breakdown of the 97 teachers for the 2024-2025 school year was:

- African American: 0.0%
- Hispanic: 19.7%
- White: 79.3%
- Native American: 0.0%
- Asian/Pacific Islander: 0.0%
- Multiracial: 1%

== Schools ==
- Ingram Tom Moore High School (Grades 9–12)
- Ingram Middle School (Grades 6–8)
- Ingram Elementary School (Grades PK-5)
Ingram ISD Facilities

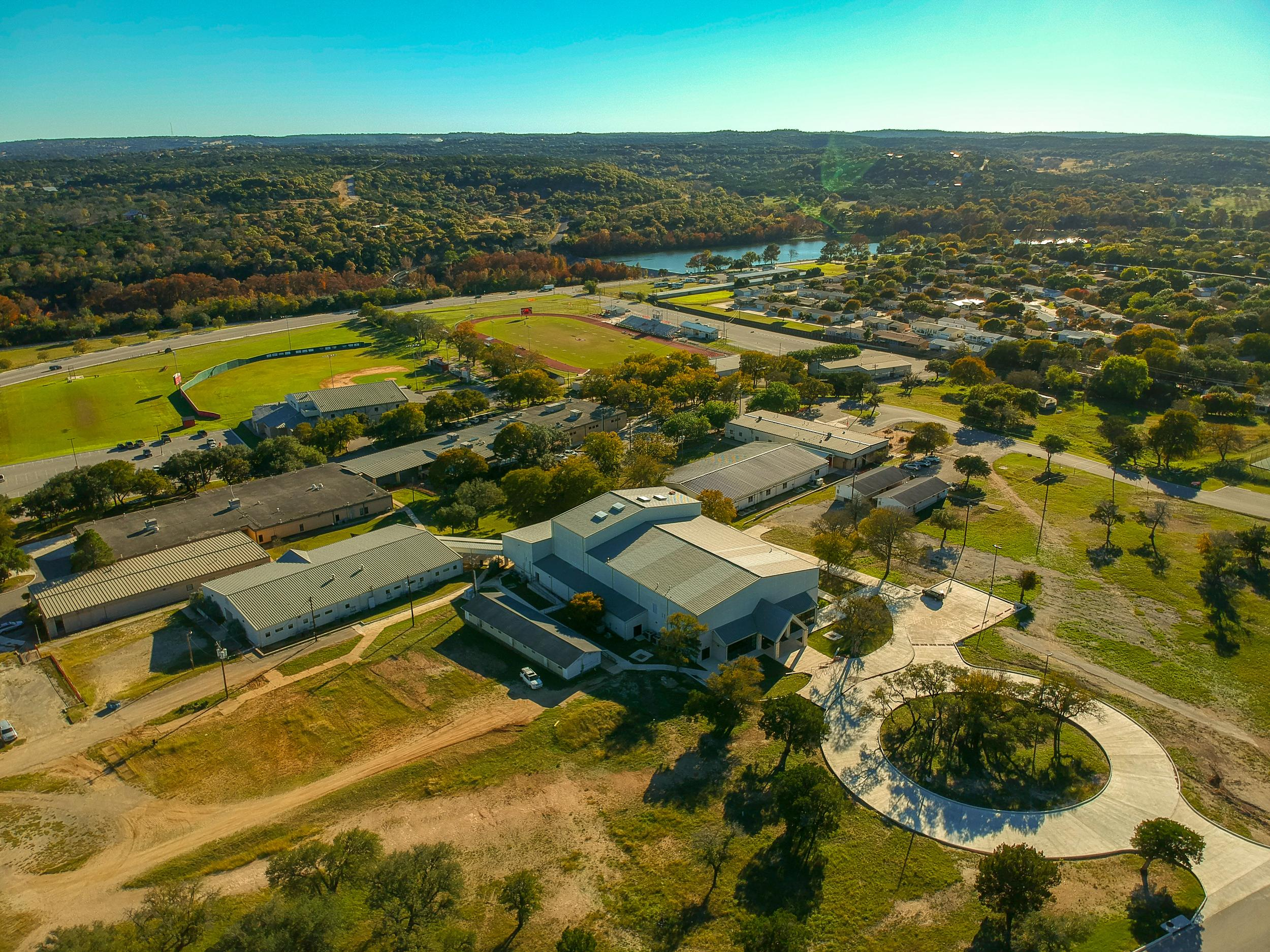
Ingram ISD Secondary Campus

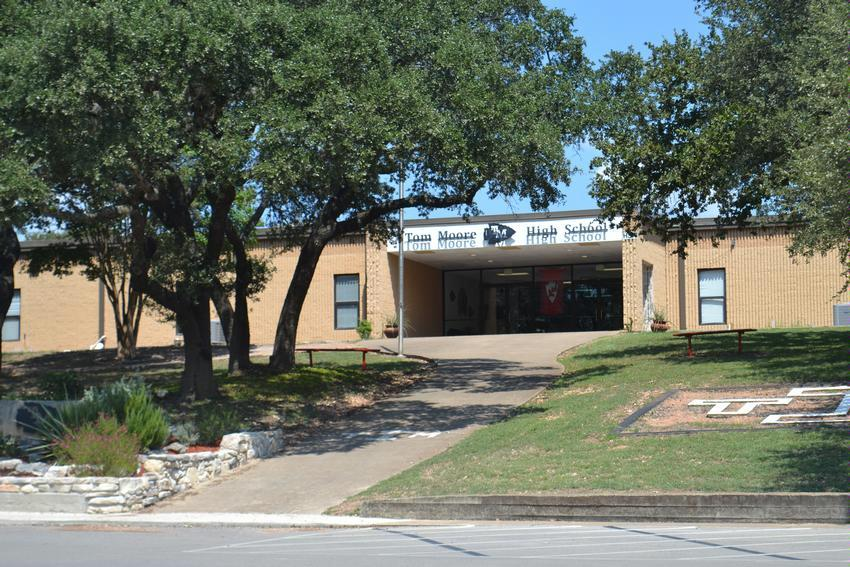
Tom Moore High School

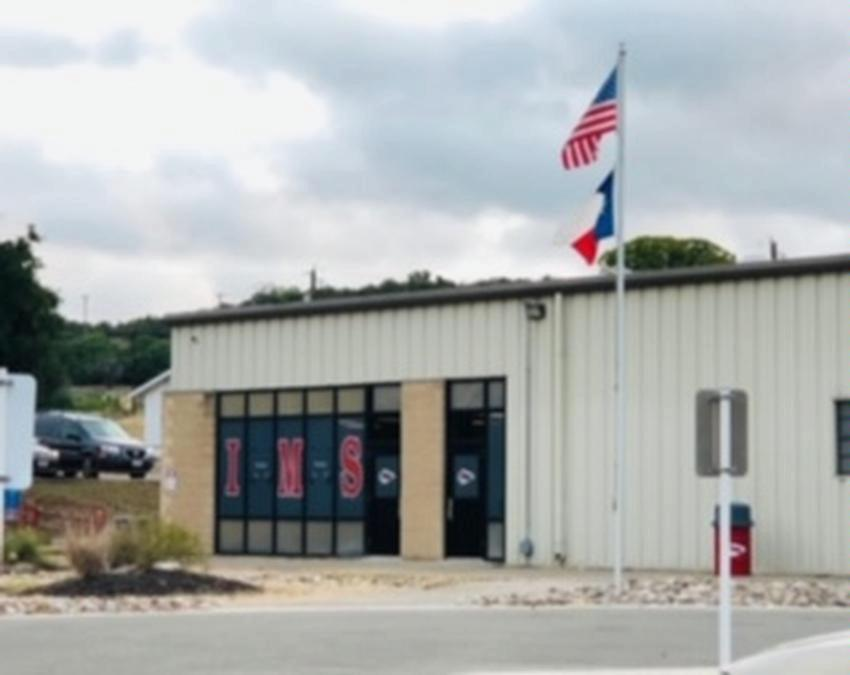
Ingram Middle School

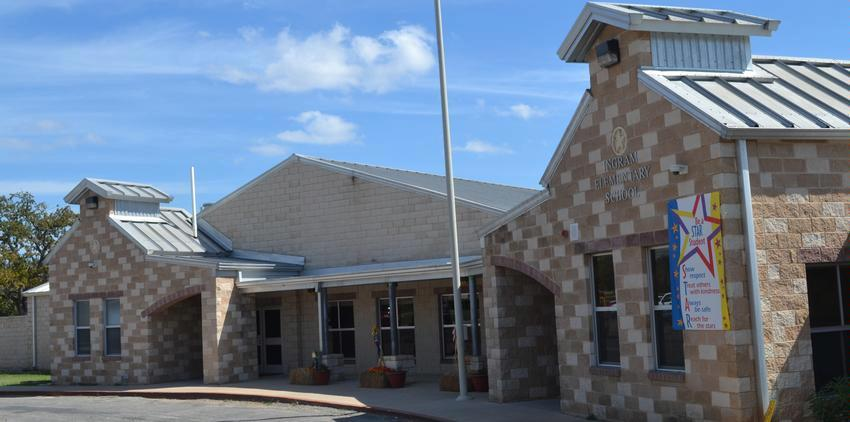
Ingram Elementary School

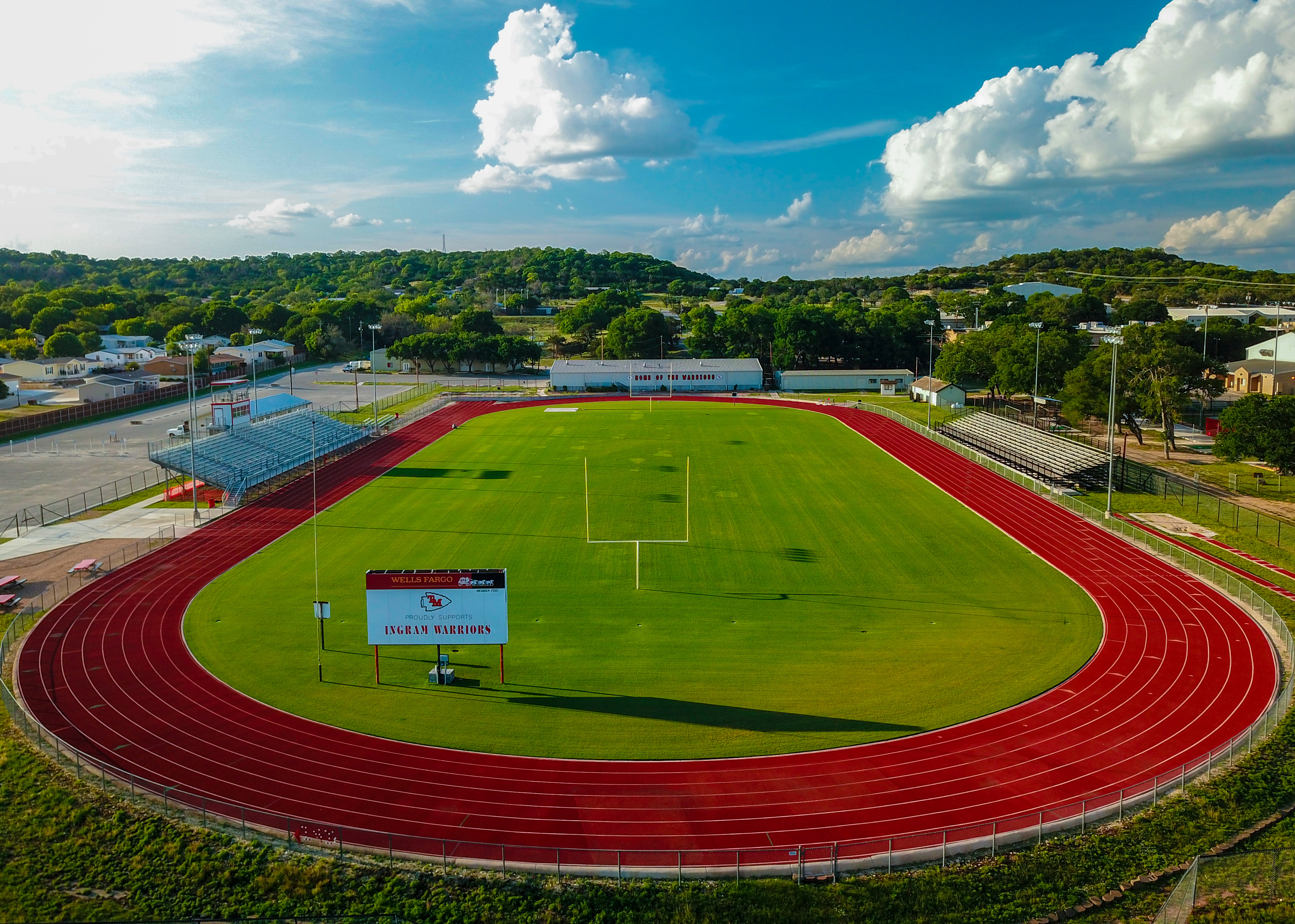
Warrior Football Stadium

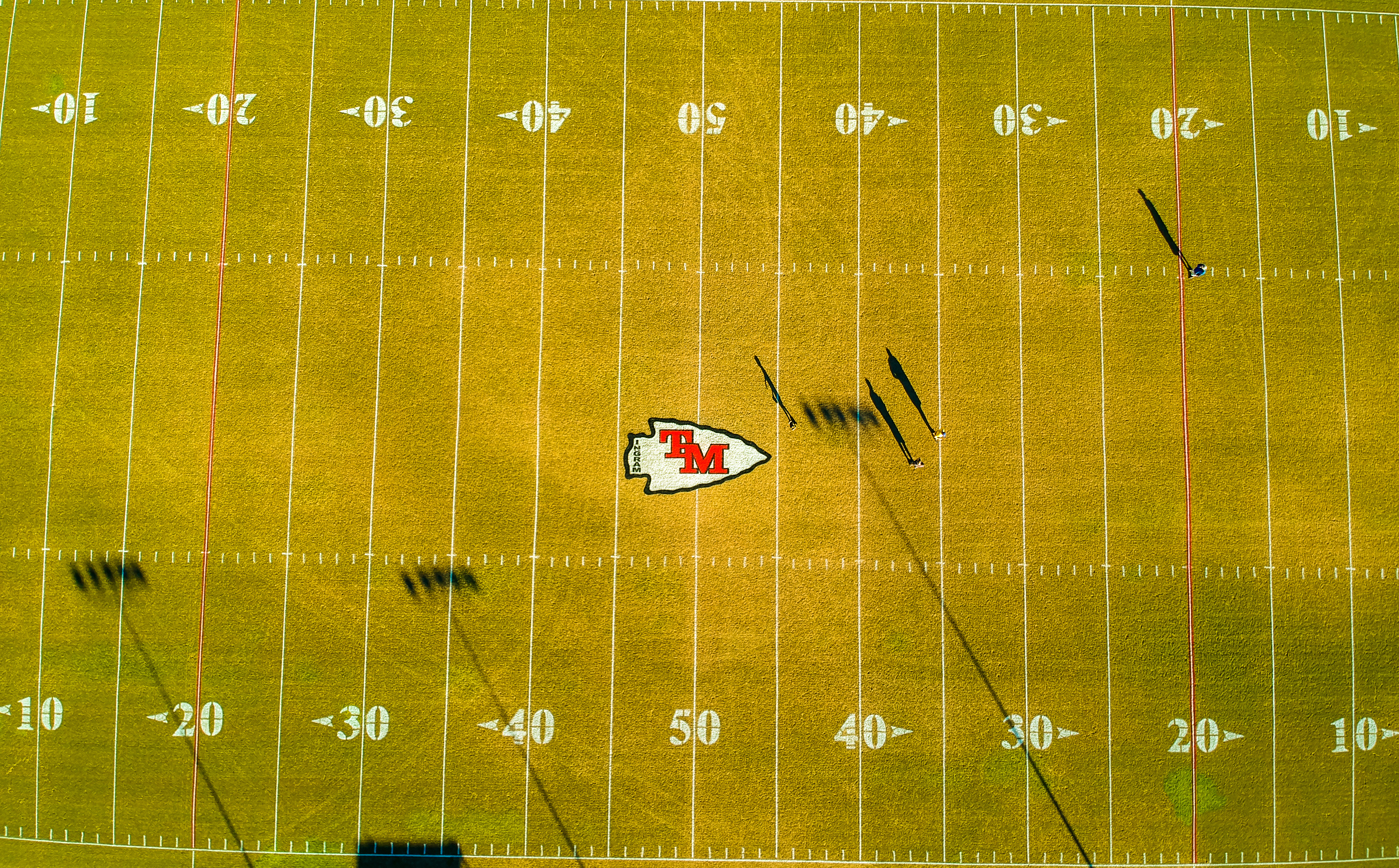
Warrior Football Stadium-Aerial View

== Academic Achievement ==
In 2011, the school district was rated "academically acceptable" by the Texas Education Agency Forty-nine percent of districts in Texas in 2011 received the same rating.

== Controversy ==
In July 2024, the ACLU of Texas sent Ingram ISD a letter, alleging that the district's 2023-2024 dress and grooming code appeared to violate the Texas CROWN Act, a state law which prohibits racial discrimination based on hair texture or styles, and asking the district to revise its policies for the 2024–2025 school year.
