= Center Point, Kerr County, Texas =

Center Point, Texas
- Unincorporated community
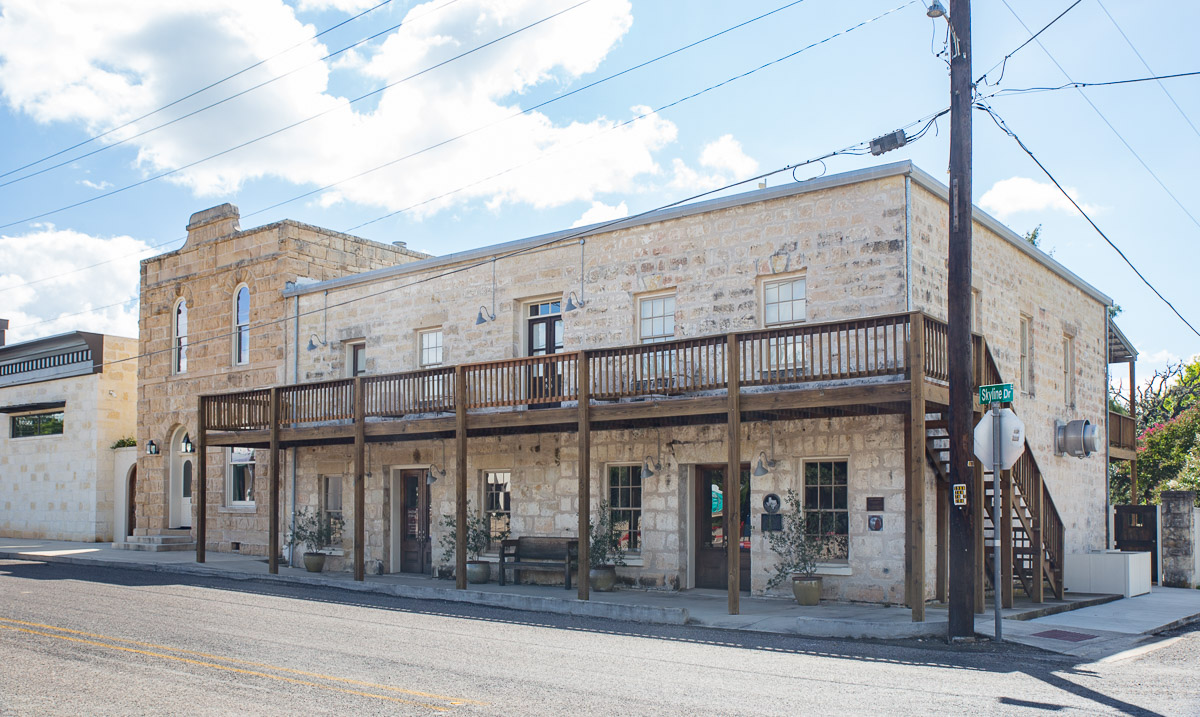
- Woolls Building (2018)

- Location within Texas Location within the United States
- Coordinates: 29°56′29″N 99°02′28″W
- Country: United States
- State: Texas
- County: Kerr

Area
  - Total: 5.40 sq mi (13.98 km^{2})
  - Land: 5.33 sq mi (13.81 km^{2})
  - Water: 0.066 sq mi (0.17 km^{2})
- Elevation: 1,513 ft (461 m)

Population (2010)
  - Total: 4,260
  - Density: 799/sq mi (308/km^{2})
- Time zone: UTC-6 (CST)
  - Summer (DST): UTC-5 (CDT)
- Area code: 830
- FIPS code: 48-13828
- GNIS ID: 2805803

Center Point is an unincorporated community in Kerr County, Texas, United States.

== History ==
In the mid-1850s, as Kerr County was establishing a new county seat, a small community to the south was being established as a major trade area between Comfort and Kerrsville (later changed to Kerrville) and Bandera and Fredericksburg.

On November 25, 1859, the first post office was established and called Zanzenberg after the ancestral home of the town founder Charles Ganahl. Originally opened in the home of Ganahl, the post office stayed there until 1872, when it was moved to the south side of the Guadalupe River, where a sizable community was being built. When the post office was reopened, it was called Center Point due to its location on the trade routes.

Founded largely by settlers from western Tennessee, the community continued to grow as relatives and neighbors from Tennessee converged on the banks of the Guadalupe to call Zanzenburg/Center Point their new home. On September 1, 1857, the first native of Center Point, Daniel C. Nowlin, was born to James Crispin Nowlin and Ann Gathings Nowlin. Daniel served as Kerr County Surveyor, sheriff of Lincoln County, New Mexico, and then to Wyoming where he was a prominent sheep rancher until his death on February 5, 1925.

The first attempt at incorporating Center Point came on August 9, 1889, for "school purposes".

At the turn of the 20th century, Center Point was a thriving trade center and remained so until, like so many communities in America, it became the victim of new highways passing it by. Once again, on March 1, 1913, Center Point voted itself an incorporated city, appointed a mayor, city clerk, commissioners’ health officer, and then, in October of the same year, dissolved itself by a popular vote of the people. It remained unincorporated until the mid-1990s, when voters once again approved incorporation. Within less than two years, it was once again voted that the incorporation should be dissolved. As such, Center Point remains one of the largest unincorporated communities in the state of Texas.

== Geography ==
=== Climate ===
Center Point experiences a humid subtropical climate, with hot summers and a generally mild winter. Temperatures range from 82 °F (28 °C) in the summer to 49 °F (9 °C) during winter.

Climate data for Center Point, Texas
Month	Jan	Feb	Mar	Apr	May	Jun	Jul	Aug	Sep	Oct	Nov	Dec	Year
Record high °F (°C)	90 (32)	96 (36)	101 (38)	104 (40)	102 (39)	108 (42)	109 (43)	109 (43)	109 (43)	102 (39)	92 (33)	88 (31)	109 (43)
Mean daily maximum °F (°C)	61 (16)	66 (19)	73 (23)	79 (26)	84 (29)	90 (32)	93 (34)	93 (34)	88 (31)	80 (27)	69 (21)	62 (17)	78 (26)
Daily mean °F (°C)	49 (9)	53 (12)	60 (16)	67 (19)	73 (23)	79 (26)	82 (28)	81 (27)	76 (24)	68 (20)	57 (14)	50 (10)	66 (19)
Mean daily minimum °F (°C)	36 (2)	39 (4)	47 (8)	54 (12)	62 (17)	68 (20)	70 (21)	69 (21)	64 (18)	56 (13)	45 (7)	38 (3)	54 (12)
Record low °F (°C)	−5 (−21)	−3 (−19)	12 (−11)	24 (−4)	38 (3)	48 (9)	55 (13)	54 (12)	35 (2)	24 (−4)	12 (−11)	1 (−17)	−5 (−21)
Average precipitation inches (mm)	1.36 (35)	1.91 (49)	1.86 (47)	2.40 (61)	4.29 (109)	3.97 (101)	2 (51)	2.74 (70)	3.07 (78)	3.72 (94)	2.19 (56)	2.14 (54)	31.65 (805)
Source: The Weather Channel

== Demographics ==
Historical population
Census	Pop.	Note	%±
2020	1,263		—
U.S. Decennial Census; 1850–1900 1910; 1920 1930 1940; 1950 1960 1970; 1980 1990 2000; 2010 2020

Center Point first appeared as a census designated place in the 2020 U.S. census.

=== 2020 census ===
Center Point CDP, Texas – Racial and ethnic composition Note: the US Census treats Hispanic/Latino as an ethnic category. This table excludes Latinos from the racial categories and assigns them to a separate category. Hispanics/Latinos may be of any race.
Race / Ethnicity (NH = Non-Hispanic)	Pop 2020	% 2020
White alone (NH)	842	66.67%
Hispanic or Latino (any race)	364	28.82%
Black or African American alone (NH)	5	0.40%
Native American or Alaska Native alone (NH)	5	0.40%
Asian alone (NH)	6	0.48%
Native Hawaiian or Pacific Islander alone (NH)	0	0.00%
Other race alone (NH)	4	0.32%
Mixed race or Multiracial (NH)	37	2.93%
Total	1,263	100.00%

As of the 2020 United States census, there were 1,263 people, 624 households, and 544 families residing in the CDP.

== Education ==
The Center Point Independent School District serves area students.

== Notable people ==
- Catherine "Sara" Haden, actress, born in Center Point on November 17, 1898.
- Carl Pfeufer, comic book artist, magazine illustrator, and fine artist, lived in Center Point.
- Stacy Sutherland, lead guitarist of the 13th Floor Elevators, is buried in Center Point Cemetery.
- Edwin Walker, United States Army officer, was born in Center Point.

== Photo Gallery ==
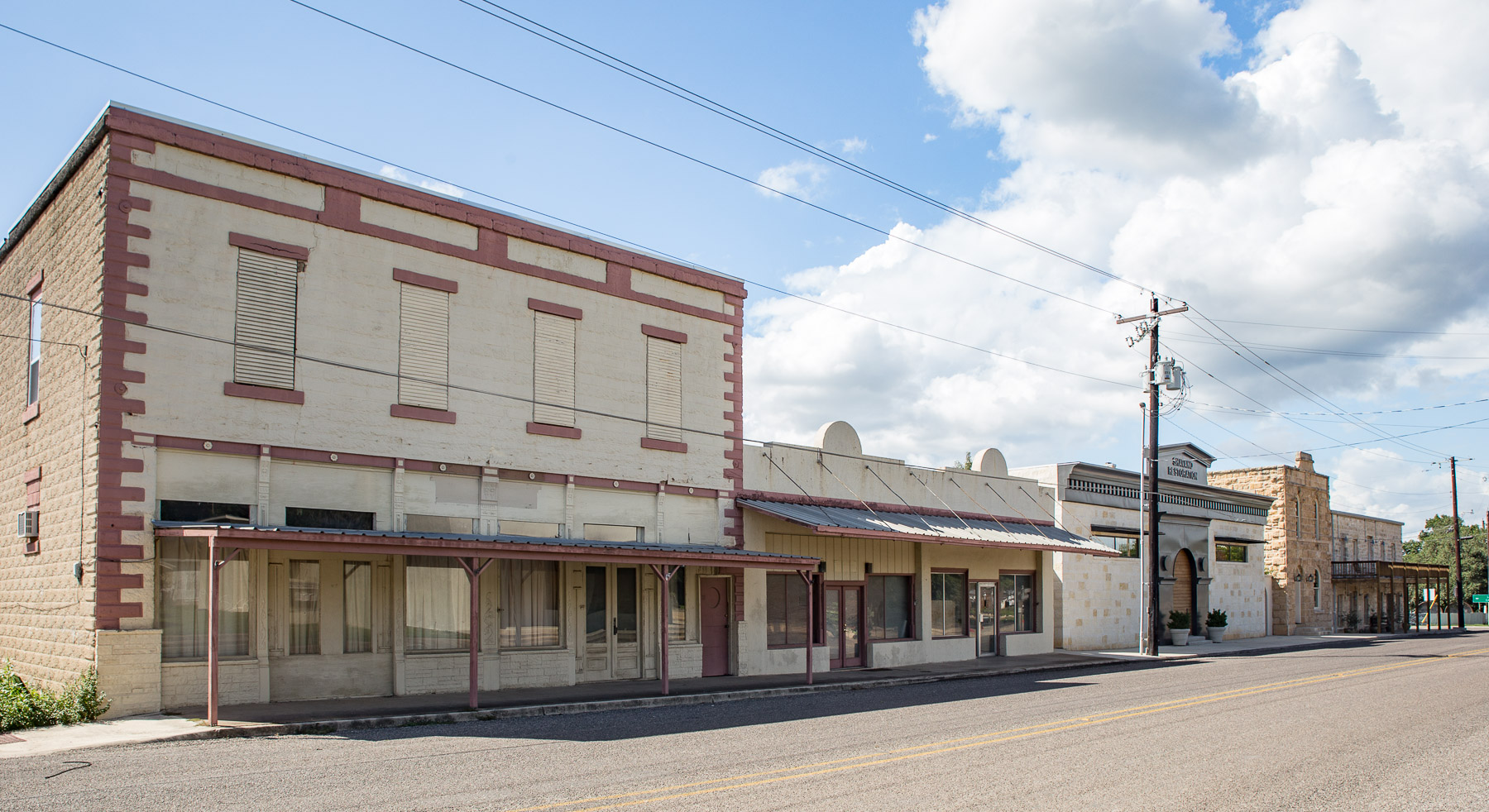
Downtown Center Point

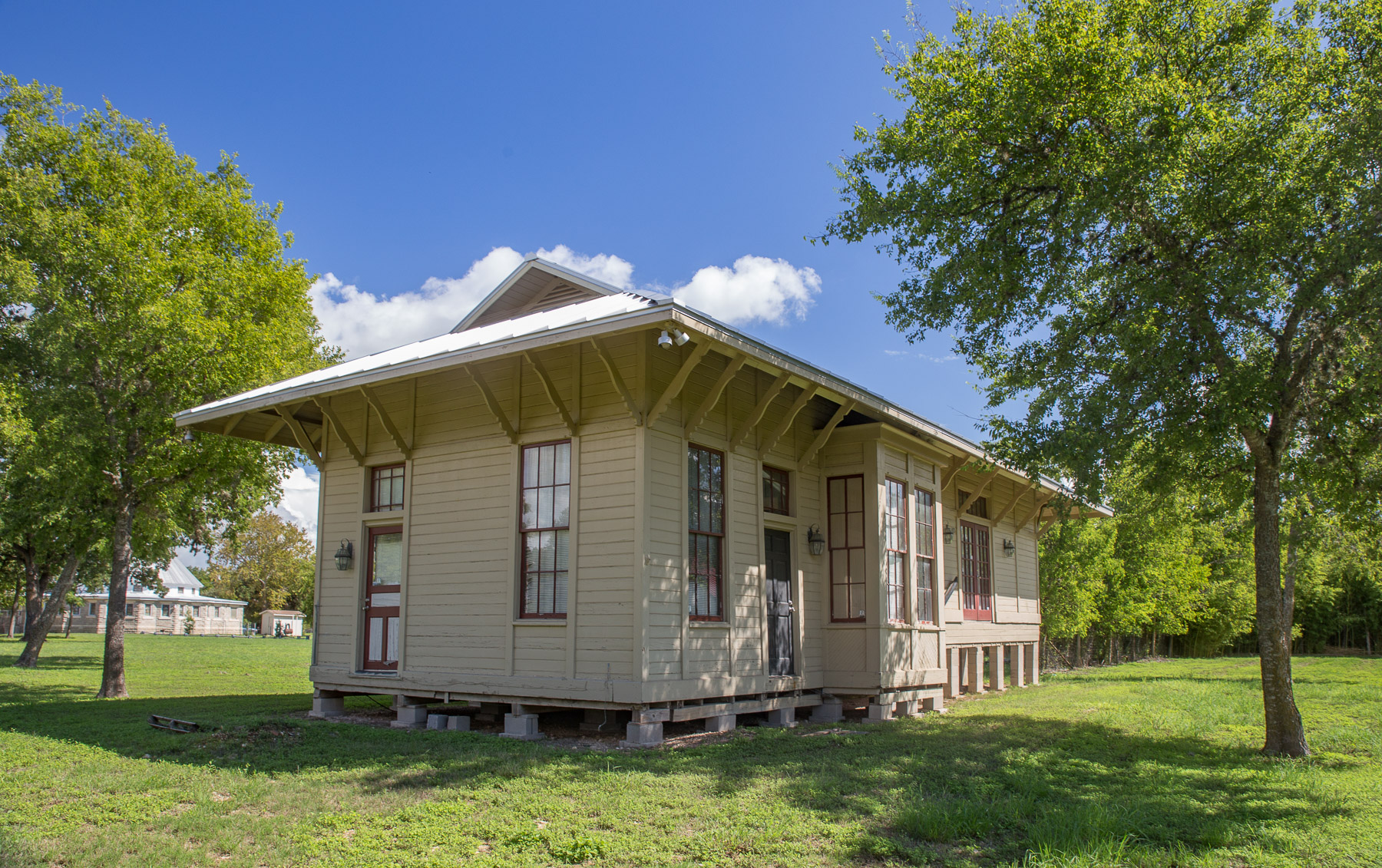
Center Point Depot

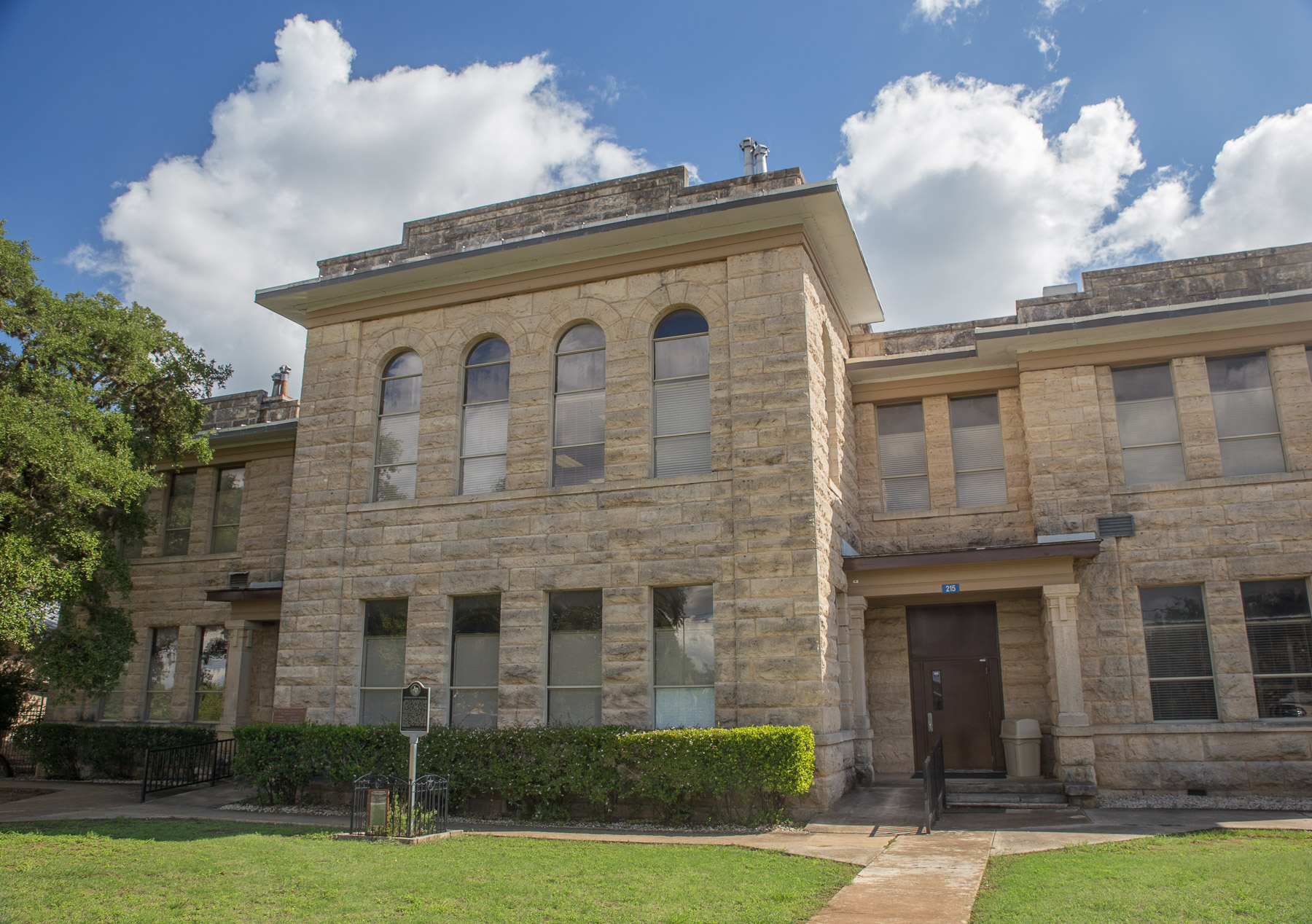
Center Point School

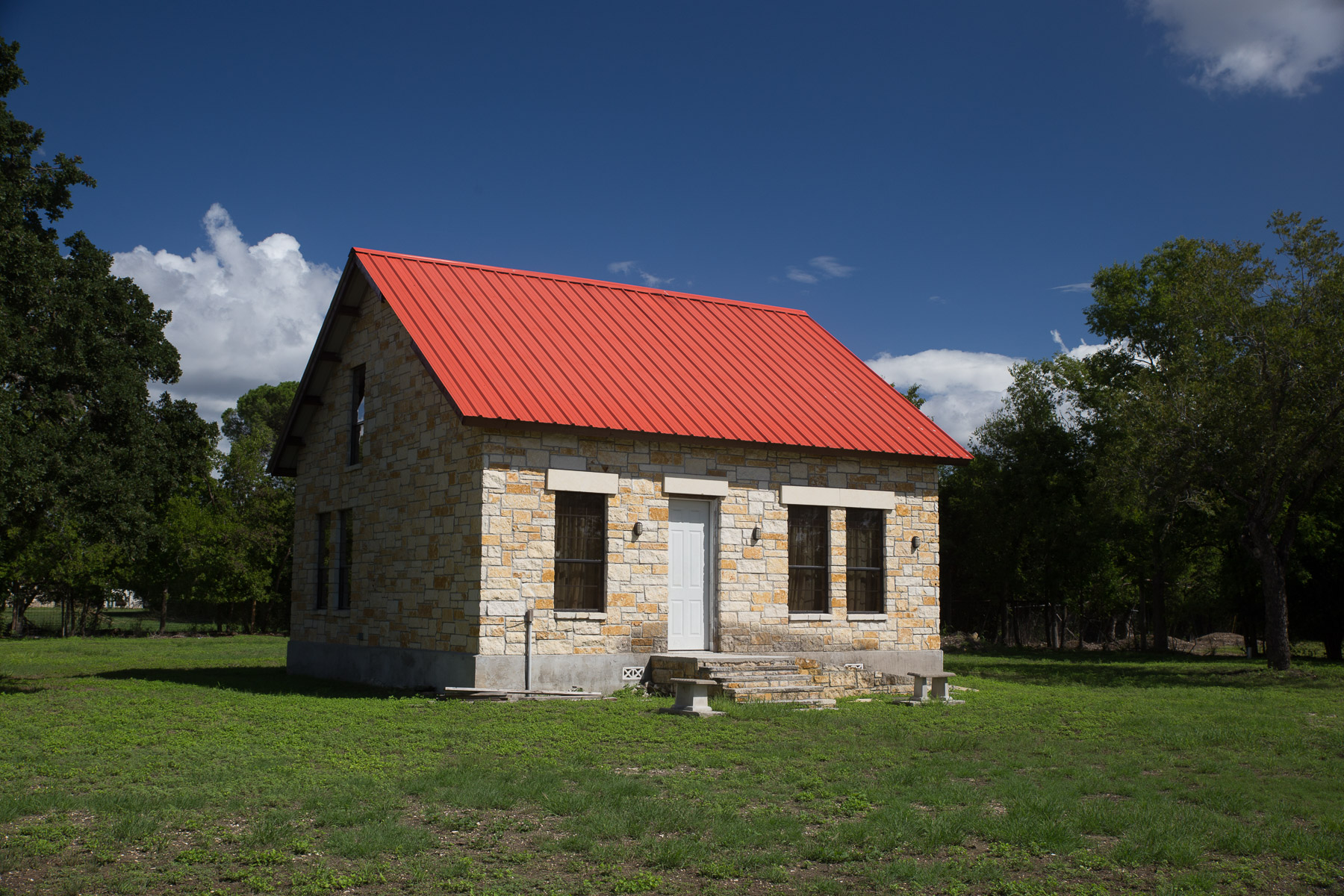
Old building in Center Point Historical Park

== See also ==
- Center Point (disambiguation), for other places called Center Point in Texas
- July 2025 Central Texas floods
