= Center Point Independent School District =

School district in Texas, United States

Coordinates: 29.942°N 99.033°W

Center Point Independent School District is a public school district based in the community of Center Point, Kerr County, Texas, US.

The district's mascot is the Pirate.

In 2009, the school district was rated "academically acceptable" by the Texas Education Agency.

== Schools ==
- Center Point High (Grades 9–12)
- Center Point Middle (Grades 6–8)
- Center Point Elementary (Grades PK–5)
