= Hunt, Texas =

- Unincorporated community
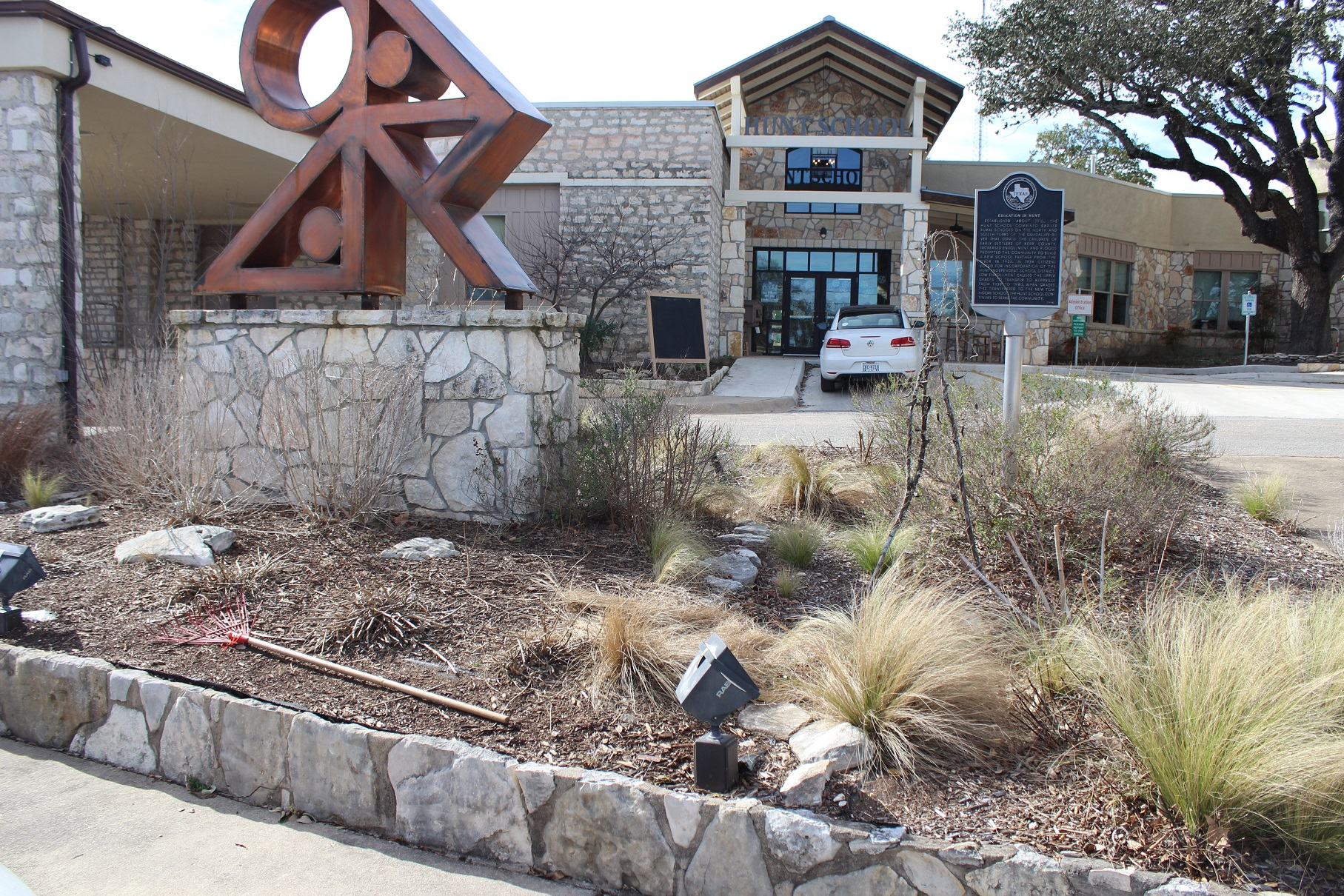
- Hunt School (2017)

- Location within Texas Location within the United States
- Coordinates: 30°04′15″N 99°20′16″W
- Country: United States
- State: Texas
- County: Kerr
- Elevation: 1,808 ft (551 m)
- Time zone: UTC-6 (CST)
  - Summer (DST): UTC-5 (CDT)
- ZIP Code: 78024
- Area code: 830
- FIPS code: 48-35444
- GNIS ID: 1338302

Hunt is an unincorporated community in western Kerr County, Texas, United States. It is in the heart of Texas's Hill Country—the rugged limestone hills that separate the coastal plain from the Edwards Plateau—at the junction of the north and south forks of the Guadalupe River on State Highway 39.

== History ==
The settlement was originally named "Japonica" (a New Latin translation of Japan); it was changed to "Hunt" when Alva Joy purchased land in the area and established a U.S. post office on the site.

The Stonehenge II replica was built on the North Fork, north of Hunt. In 2012, Stonehenge II was moved to the front yard of the Point Theater in nearby Ingram.

On July 4, 2025, after large amounts of rain fell suddenly in Central Texas, the Guadalupe River rose 26 to 30 feet (8 to 9 m) in the Hunt area, triggering massive flooding.

== Geography ==
Hunt sits at the confluence of the north and south forks of the Guadalupe River.

== Economy ==
While the official population of Hunt is 1,332, more than 3,000 campers and family members spend their summer there. This makes summer very lucrative for local businesses.

Many summer camps for girls are in the Hunt area, including Camp Honey Creek, Camp Mystic for Girls, and Camp Waldemar. All-boys camps include Camp Stewart for Boys, Camp LaJunta, and Camp Rio Vista. Co-ed camps in the hilly area include Mo-Ranch.

Since 1972, Hunt has been the home to La Hacienda Addiction Treatment Center.

== Education ==
It is in the Hunt Independent School District.

== See also ==
- July 2025 Central Texas floods
- Camp Mystic
