= Ingram, Texas =

- City
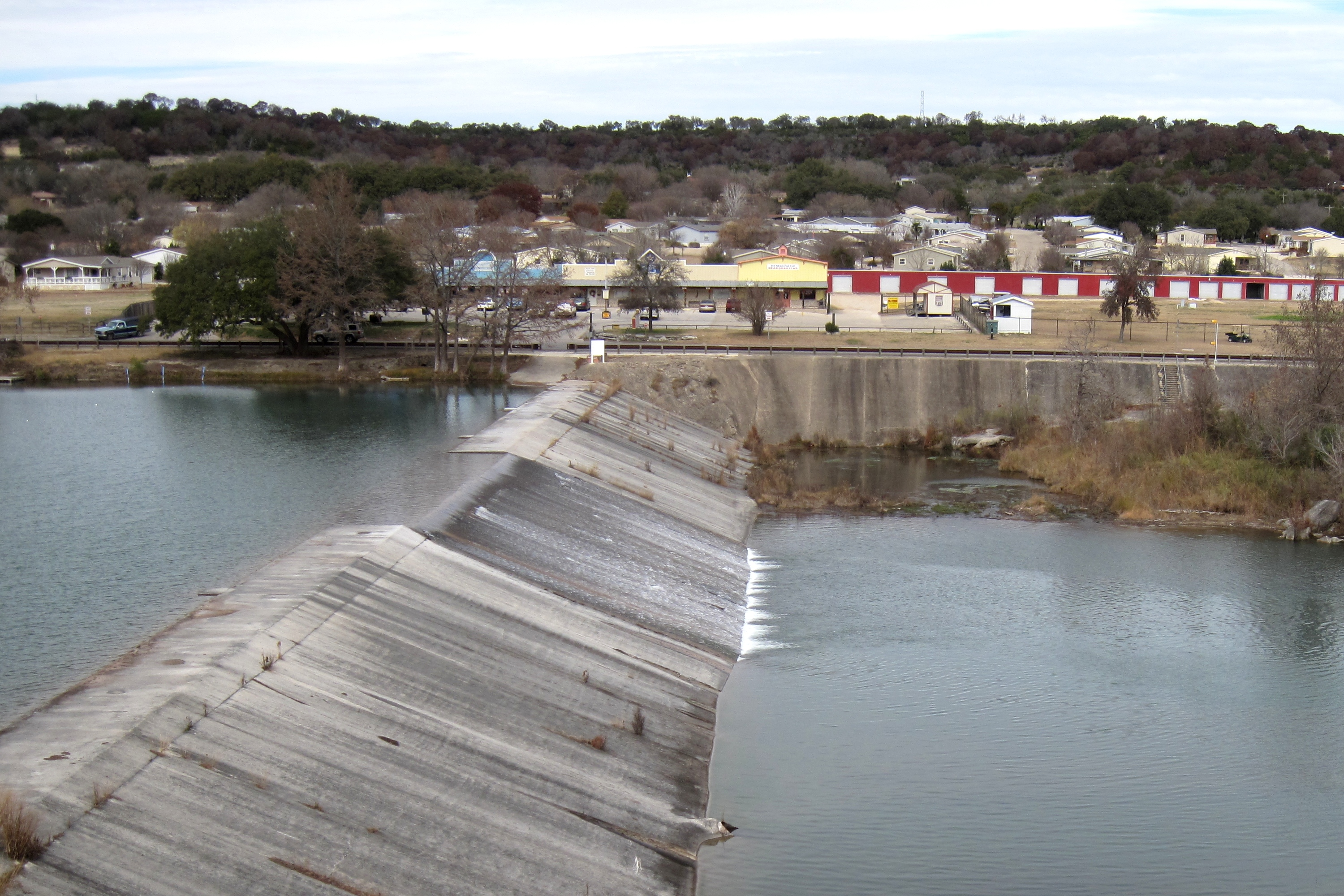
- Ingram Dam with town in the background

- Location within Kerr County and Texas
- Coordinates: 30.077052°N 99.237509°W
- Country: United States
- State: Texas
- County: Kerr
- Founded: 1879
- Incorporated: 1981

Government
  - Mayor: Claud Jordan

Area
  - Total: 1.500 sq mi (3.885 km^{2})
  - Land: 1.468 sq mi (3.801 km^{2})
  - Water: 0.033 sq mi (0.085 km^{2}) 2.20%
- Elevation: 1,723 ft (525 m)

Population (2020)
  - Total: 1,787
  - Estimate (2024): 1,849
  - Density: 1,218/sq mi (470.1/km^{2})
- Time zone: UTC−6 (CST)
  - Summer (DST): UTC−5 (CDT)
- ZIP Code: 78025
- Area code: 830
- FIPS code: 48-36032
- GNIS ID: 2410107
- Website: cityofingram.com

Ingram is a city in Kerr County, Texas, United States. The population was 1,787 at the 2020 census, and was estimated to be 1,849 in 2024,

== History ==
Ingram is founded on 1879 by J. C. W. Ingram

== Geography ==
Ingram is located in eastern Kerr County at (30.077052 -99.237509), on the Guadalupe River in the Texas Hill Country. It is the first city the Guadalupe River passes through downstream from its source near Hunt. It is 6 miles (10 km) west of Kerrville and 72 miles (116 km) northwest of San Antonio. Texas State Highway 27 passes through the center of town, leading east to Kerrville and northwest 10 miles (16 km) to Mountain Home. Texas State Highway 39 runs west from Ingram 6 miles (10 km) to Hunt. Interstate 10 comes within 5 miles (8 km) of Ingram, with the closest access from Exit 501 (FM 1338).

According to the United States Census Bureau, the city has a total area of 1.500 square miles (3.88 km^{2}), of which 1.467 square miles (3.80 km^{2}) is land and 0.033 square miles (0.09 km^{2}) (2.20%) is water.

One of the main attractions of Ingram is the swimming activities along the Guadalupe River, which runs through the town. A staple of this is Ingram Dam, a structure where the water flows easily over the dam, creating a layer of algae in the stream down the concrete. People frequently congregate and swim around the dam, as well as sliding down the slick algae for recreation.

An artistic replica of Stonehenge is located on the grounds of the Hill Country Arts Foundation.

=== Climate ===
The climate in this area is characterized by hot, humid summers and generally mild to cool winters. According to the Köppen Climate Classification system, Ingram has a humid subtropical climate, abbreviated "Cfa" on climate maps.

== Demographics ==
Historical population
| Census | Pop. | Note | %± |
|---|---|---|---|
| 1980 | 1,921 | | — |
| 1990 | 1,408 | | −26.7% |
| 2000 | 1,740 | | 23.6% |
| 2010 | 1,804 | | 3.7% |
| 2020 | 1,787 | | −0.9% |
| 2024 (est.) | 1,849 | | 3.5% |
U.S. Decennial Census; 2020 Census

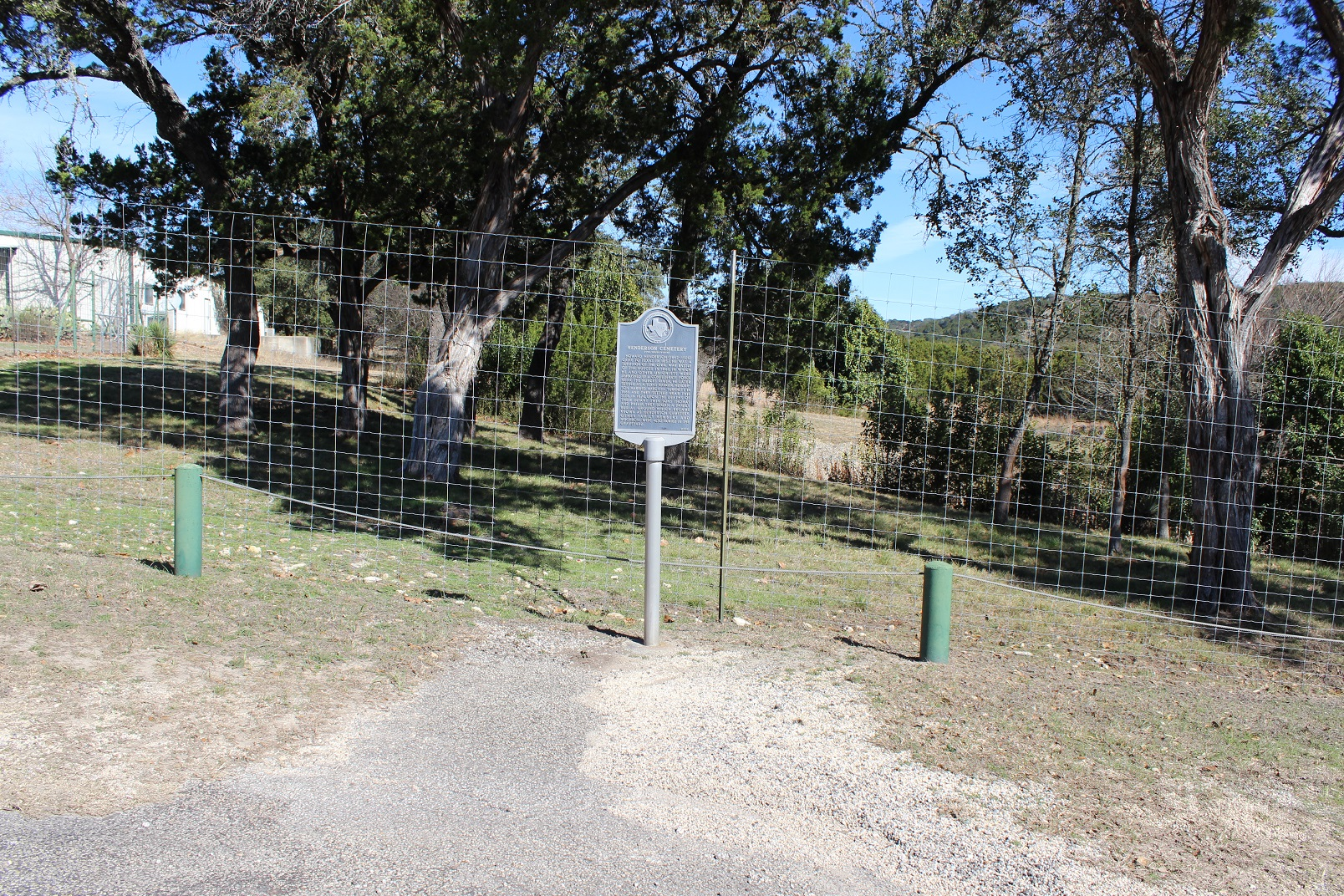
Cemetery with historical marker

Ingram was first listed as a census designated place in the 1980 census It was incorporated as a city in June 1981 and thus listed as a city since the 1990 census.

As of the 2023 American Community Survey, there are 722 estimated households in Ingram with an average of 2.90 persons per household. The city has a median household income of $49,295. Approximately 16.5% of the city's population lives at or below the poverty line. Ingram has an estimated 66.2% employment rate, with 8.7% of the population holding a bachelor's degree or higher and 74.3% holding a high school diploma.

The top five reported ancestries (people were allowed to report up to two ancestries, thus the figures will generally add to more than 100%) were English (72.2%), Spanish (26.9%), Indo-European (0.2%), Asian and Pacific Islander (0.7%), and Other (0.0%).

Ingram has a sizeable Latino population with many immigrants reportedly from Guanajuato. The city police department's cooperation with United States Immigration and Customs Enforcement was featured in a 2026 ProPublica investigation into the impact of deportations.

The town became well known for the Ingram Police Department's working relationship with ICE in which local police officers are deputized to arrest, imprison, and deport suspected immigrants regardless of due process. As a result of the police department's aggressive campaign, over 10% of the town's population has since been deported, leading to an increase in tension, division, and instability between law enforcement and the town's populace.

=== Racial and ethnic composition ===
Ingram, Texas – racial and ethnic composition Note: the US Census treats Hispanic/Latino as an ethnic category. This table excludes Latinos from the racial categories and assigns them to a separate category. Hispanics/Latinos may be of any race.
| Race / ethnicity (NH = non-Hispanic) | Pop. 2000 | Pop. 2010 | Pop. 2020 | % 2000 | % 2010 | % 2020 |
|---|---|---|---|---|---|---|
| White alone (NH) | 1,466 | 1,291 | 1,132 | 84.25% | 71.56% | 63.35% |
| Hispanic or Latino (any race) | 243 | 455 | 579 | 13.97% | 25.22% | 32.40% |
| Black or African American alone (NH) | 2 | 16 | 7 | 0.11% | 0.89% | 0.39% |
| Native American or Alaska Native alone (NH) | 7 | 7 | 9 | 0.40% | 0.39% | 0.50% |
| Asian alone (NH) | 9 | 17 | 17 | 0.52% | 0.94% | 0.95% |
| Pacific Islander alone (NH) | 1 | 0 | 0 | 0.06% | 0.00% | 0.00% |
| Other race alone (NH) | 0 | 0 | 2 | 0.00% | 0.00% | 0.11% |
| Mixed race or multiracial (NH) | 12 | 18 | 41 | 0.69% | 1.00% | 2.29% |
| Total | 1,740 | 1,804 | 1,787 | 100.00% | 100.00% | 100.00% |

=== 2020 census ===
As of the 2020 census, there were 1,787 people, 674 households, and 439 families residing in the city. The median age was 37.2 years, with 26.0% of residents under the age of 18 and 14.4% aged 65 years or older. For every 100 females, there were 102.1 males, and for every 100 females age 18 and over there were 102.9 males age 18 and over.

100.0% of residents lived in urban areas, while 0.0% lived in rural areas.

The population density was 1,218.13 inhabitants per square mile (470.3/km^{2}). There were 791 housing units at an average density of 539.20 per square mile (208.2/km^{2}).

There were 674 households, of which 36.8% had children under the age of 18 living in them. Of all households, 45.7% were married-couple households, 24.0% were households with a male householder and no spouse or partner present, and 22.4% were households with a female householder and no spouse or partner present. About 28.8% of all households were made up of individuals and 12.3% had someone living alone who was 65 years of age or older.

There were 791 housing units, of which 14.8% were vacant. The homeowner vacancy rate was 2.0% and the rental vacancy rate was 14.6%.

Racial composition as of the 2020 census
| Race | Number | Percent |
|---|---|---|
| White | 1,237 | 69.2% |
| Black or African American | 9 | 0.5% |
| American Indian and Alaska Native | 13 | 0.7% |
| Asian | 18 | 1.0% |
| Native Hawaiian and Other Pacific Islander | 0 | 0.0% |
| Some other race | 153 | 8.6% |
| Two or more races | 357 | 20.0% |
| Hispanic or Latino (of any race) | 579 | 32.4% |

=== 2010 census ===
As of the 2010 census, there were 1,804 people and 681 households residing in the city. The population density was 1,298.78 inhabitants per square mile (501.5/km^{2}). There were 776 housing units at an average density of 558.68 per square mile (215.7/km^{2}). The racial makeup of the city was 86.70% White, 1.05% African American, 1.39% Native American, 0.94% Asian, 0.00% Pacific Islander, 8.54% from some other races and 1.39% from two or more races. Hispanic or Latino people of any race were 25.22% of the population.

=== 2000 census ===
As of the 2000 census, there were 1,740 people, 639 households, and 470 families residing in the city. The population density was 1,364.1 inhabitants per square mile (526.7/km^{2}). There were 711 housing units at an average density of 557.4 per square mile (215.2/km^{2}). The racial makeup of the city was 94.94% White, 0.11% African American, 0.57% Native American, 0.57% Asian, 0.06% Pacific Islander, 2.76% from some other races and 0.98% from two or more races. Hispanic or Latino people of any race were 13.97% of the population.

There were 639 households, out of which 37.4% had children under the age of 18 living with them, 55.2% were married couples living together, 13.0% had a female householder with no husband present, and 26.4% were non-families. 22.7% of all households were made up of individuals, and 11.6% had someone living alone who was 65 years of age or older. The average household size was 2.72 and the average family size was 3.19.

In the city, the population was spread out, with 29.4% under the age of 18, 8.4% from 18 to 24, 30.2% from 25 to 44, 20.6% from 45 to 64, and 11.4% who were 65 years of age or older. The median age was 35 years. For every 100 females, there were 99.3 males. For every 100 females age 18 and over, there were 94.3 males.

The median income for a household in the city was $30,958, and the median income for a family was $33,542. Males had a median income of $24,779 versus $17,738 for females. The per capita income for the city was $12,883. About 11.0% of families and 13.3% of the population were below the poverty line, including 15.3% of those under age 18 and 12.5% of those age 65 or over.

=== Camps ===
Due to the popular summer camps in the area, the population grows significantly June through August. One of the more well known camps in Ingram is privately owned Vista Camps which has two camps, Camp Rio Vista for Boys and Camp Sierra Vista for Girls. Camp Rio Vista is the oldest boys camp in Texas having been established in 1921.

== Education ==
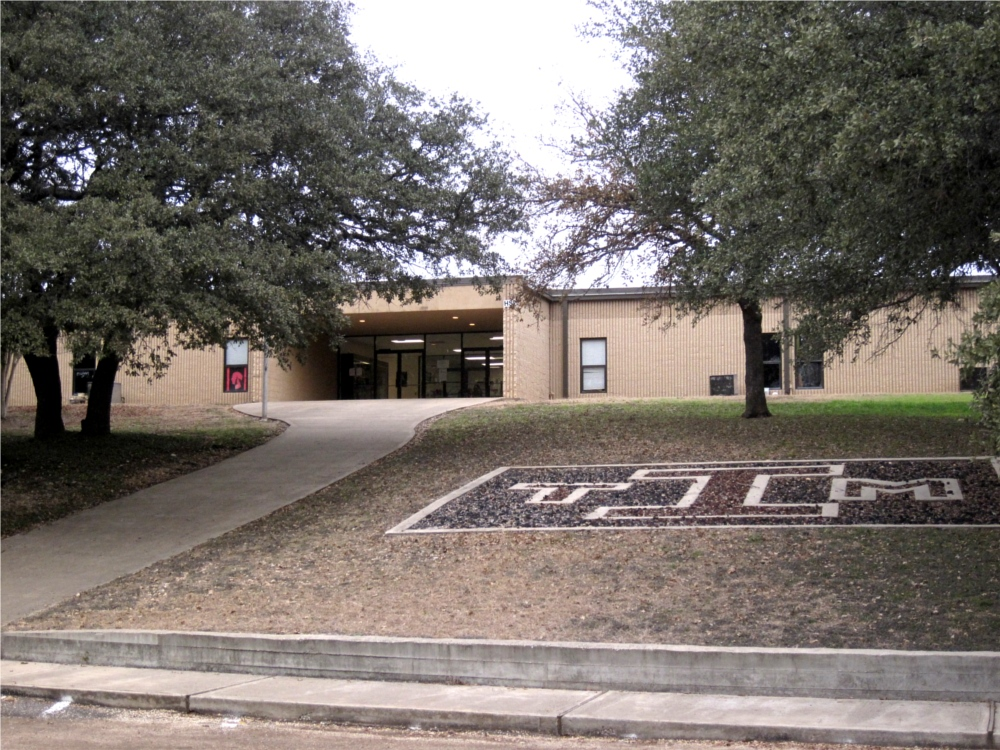
Tom Moore High School

The city is served by the Ingram Independent School District.

== See also ==
- July 2025 Central Texas floods
