= Joshua Brown (Texas pioneer) =

American pioneer (1816–1876)

Joshua David Brown (1816–1876) was a Texas pioneer who became the first settler of Kerrville, the seat of Kerr County in the Texas Hill Country west of San Antonio. Brown donated the original 4-acre (16,000 m^{2}) townsite for Kerrville, and the community was named after his friend and fellow Kentucky native, James Kerr (1790–1850). Brown made his living by making shingles harvested from cypress trees growing along the Guadalupe River.

== Background ==
Map of Kerr County Texas highlighting Kerrville

Brown was born in Madison County, Kentucky in 1816. His parents, Edward Brown and Anastasia Campbell Brown, migrated to Sabine County, Texas in the 1830s and Joshua followed them in 1837. After arriving in Texas, military service followed Brown; after leaving the military, he returned home and received a certificate for 640 acres of land. Brown was living in Gonzales when he became interested in shingle-making. It was during this time at Green DeWitt's Colony at Gonzales that he became friends with James Kerr, a fellow soldier and later a land surveyor and official of the Colony. Brown then moved to a small settlement named Curry's Creek in Kendall County, where he learned the craft of shingle-making using cypress trees. In 1846, Brown and a group of ten men (all shingle-makers) went up the Guadalupe River to look for cypress trees and selected a site to develop which would later become Kerrville. Brown and his men remained and worked at the camp for a few months until the Apache's drove them from the area. Brown and his men returned to the area in 1848. They remained this time, naming their settlement Brownsborough. Settlers followed them to the camp and established sawmills and farms along the river and streams.

Postal authorities had originally planned to name the new settlement "Brownsburg"; however, with so many surrounding communities having "Brown" as part of their name, Brown suggested the name Kerrsville in honor of his friend, Major James Kerr, who never saw the area named for him. The letter "s" was eventually dropped from the original name, becoming Kerrville. In 1855, Brown petitioned the Texas legislature to form a new county, to be called Kerr County, from a large area of land out of Bexar County. The legislation was passed in 1856, and Brown then purchased more acreage. From this tract of land, he donated four acres to build a courthouse, public school, and separate jail for the new county. At this time, Brown also requested that Kerrville become the Kerr County seat.

=== Family ===
In 1846, Brown married Eleanor Smith, and the couple had one daughter together, Mary Louisa; Smith died in 1848. A year later, he married Sarah Jane Goss (1834–1892), and they had seven children together. The couple purchased 2,000 acres southeast of Kerrville, where they built their home for the rest of their lives. A portion of that land is now the Kerrville Veteran's Administration Medical Center. Brown and his second wife are both buried in Brown-Goss cemetery, near the Veteran's Hospital on land donated by the Browns.

== Military service ==
Brown served in the Cherokee Expedition in 1839 to expel the Cherokee people from East Texas, and participated in The Texas Revolution. Brown also served under Captain Zumwalt's command in the Wall's Campaign of 1842 and fought against the Mexican Army at Salado Creek in Bexar County at the Dawson Massacre. Brown was a veteran of the Summerville Campaign, also known as the Mier Expedition, and he ended his military service with the Texas Volunteers Mounted Regiment and Benjamin McCulloch's spy command.

== Kerrville now ==
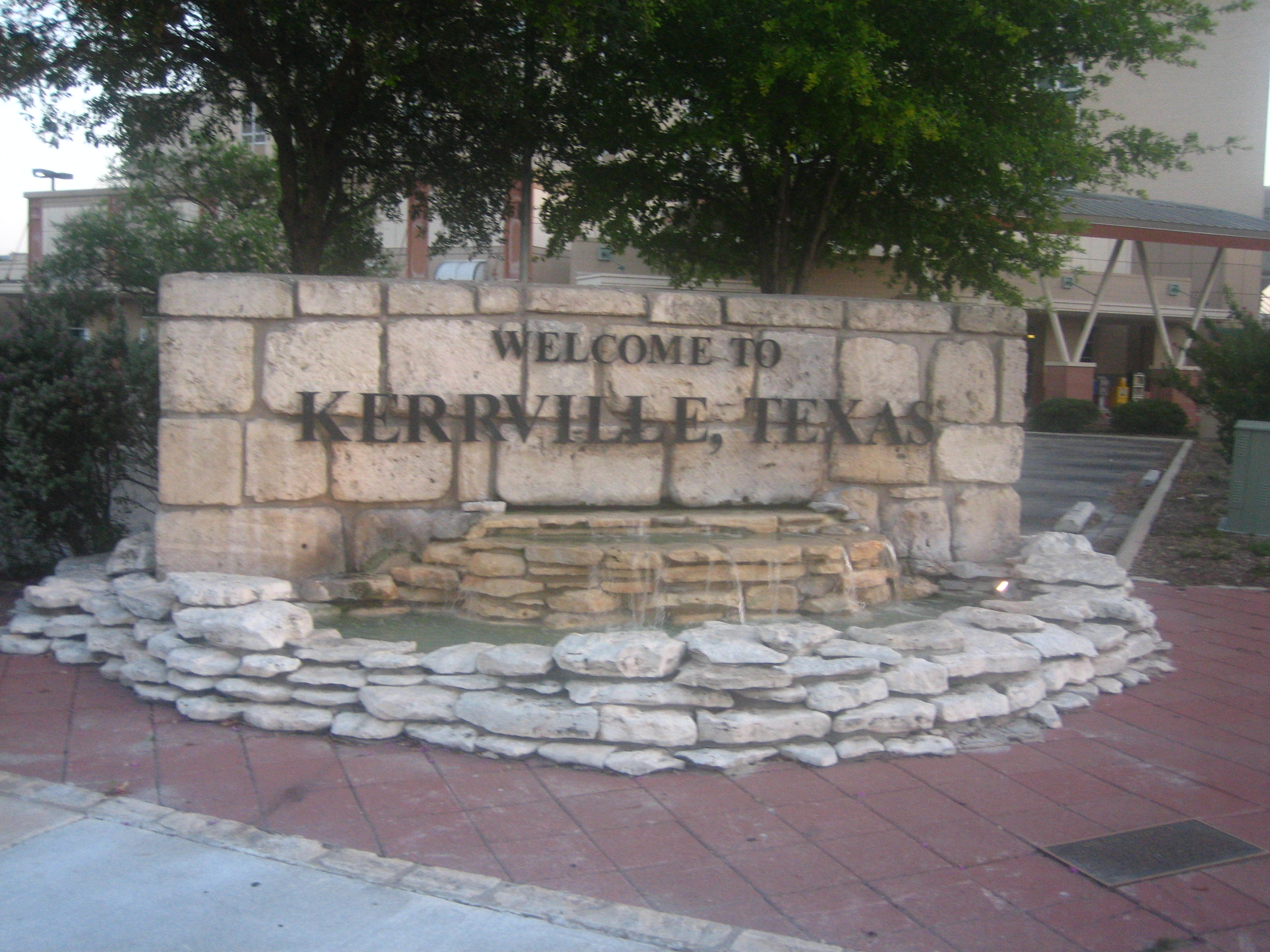
Kerrville welcome monument

In 1923, a portion of the Brown-Goss Cemetery was granted to the Woman's Auxiliary of a local American Legion post for a veterans' burial ground that would later become Kerrville National Cemetery. In 1986, a historical marker was dedicated to Brown that denotes he had the first business venture in Kerrville, a shingle and lumber mill that furnished building material for the first buildings of Kerrville. The marker was the first sanctioned dedication of the 1986 Sesquicentennial by the Kerr County Historical Commission. A Memorial Medallion was also placed on the Brown headstone by the Daughters of the Republic of Texas members. In 1998, a CSA Bronze Marker was dedicated by the Captain Charles Schreiner Chapter further to honor Brown and his contributions to the town.

The population of Kerrville in 2012 was 22,455. Kerrville is now known for its landscapes, scenic roadways, river and streams, lakes, caves, biological diversity, ranches, architecture, and popular culture. The city is also home to Texas' Official State Arts and Crafts Fair, the Kerrville Folk Festival, the Museum of Western Art, and Schreiner University. The Kerrville Independent School District services Kerville with four elementary schools, two middle and two high schools. In addition, there are also two Catholic schools and the Grace Academy of Kerrville, which provide an alternative to the public school system.
