= Fritz White =

American sculptor

- Born: January 14, 1930; Ohio, U.S.
- Died: April 11, 2010 (aged 80)
- Education: University of Cincinnati
- Occupation: Sculptor
- Spouse: Ina White

Fritz White (January 14, 1930 - April 11, 2010) was an American Korean War veteran and sculptor of the American West. His work can be seen at the Gilcrease Museum, the Museum of Western Art, and the Phoenix Art Museum.

== Life ==
White was born on January 14, 1930, in Southwest Ohio. He began studying art at age 12, and he served in the Korean War as a Marine. He graduated from the University of Cincinnati, where he played football.

White began designing sculptures in 1962, and he joined the Cowboy Artists of America in 1972. In 1978, he was one of the first artists to move to Loveland, Colorado; it later became an art colony for sculptors. White turned an old church into his studio.

White won seven gold medals for his sculptures from the CAA. His work was added to the collections of the Gilcrease Museum and the Phoenix Art Museum. A large sculpture he designed for the Museum of Western Art in Kerrville, Texas stands in front of the main entrance.

With his wife Ina, White resided in Loveland, Colorado. He died on April 11, 2010.
