= Gerald Harvey Jones =

American painter

- Born: November 1, 1933; San Antonio, Texas, U.S.
- Died: November 13, 2017 (aged 84)
- Resting place: Texas State Cemetery
- Education: Abilene Christian University; University of North Texas
- Occupation: Painter
- Spouse: Patty Marie Bentley Jones
- Children: 1 son, 1 daughter

G. Harvey (born Gerald Harvey Jones; November 1, 1933 – November 13, 2017) was an American traditionalist artist whose career spanned five decades with a wide range of collectors from Lyndon B. Johnson to Margaret Thatcher and Texas Governor John Connally. Harvey's paintings and sculptures have been collected and showcased throughout the world, including The White House and the Embassy of the United States, Moscow.

== Early life ==
Jones was born on November 1, 1933, in San Antonio, Texas. He was inspired to draw western scenes from his grandfather's stories of living on the Texas Frontier.

Jones graduated from Tivy High School in Kerrville, Texas in 1952. He attended Abilene Christian University and graduated cum laude from the University of North Texas in 1956 with a degree in industrial arts. Shortly thereafter, Harvey became an industrial arts teacher at O. Henry Middle School in Austin, Texas. Throughout his teaching career, he continued to draw, sculpt, and paint. One day, he took some of his works to the Country Store Gallery in Austin, Texas, for constructive criticism. Once the dealer criticized his pieces, he began buying Jones' supplies and would pay him $25 for a painting. He also taught Jones how established artists had worked, and after a few years of this study, Jones began painting in his own style.

== Career ==
Throughout his early years as an artist, Jones served on the staff of the University of Texas at Austin as a supervisor to the Texas Union of Arts and Crafts. During this time he discovered the great painters of light, in particular, Childe Hassam, Jean-Baptiste-Camille Corot and J.M.W. Turner; he also became interested in the works of Luigi Loir, Jean-Bernart Duvivier and Edouard Cortès. Soon he began to shift from teaching to working on his art, and eventually he became a full-time artist.

In 1957, Jones began selling his paintings under the signature G. Harvey Jones. A year later, he shortened it to G. Harvey. Soon thereafter, in 1965 he entered his first major show, the Grand National Exhibition in New York City and was bestowed the New Masters Award by the American Artists Professional League.

Although initially a Texas landscape painter, from 1975 – 1985 Jones attempted multiple times to join the Cowboy Artists of America and failed. He began working with the techniques he had learned from studying French boulevard artists Luigi Loir and Eugène Galien-Laloue and their incorporation of illuminating street lights. He began to mix this lighting technique into his own paintings, and was the first American artist to apply them to western art. People began to take notice of Harvey's talent and his work began expanding to other major cities in the U.S.

His original paintings have sold in the thousands of dollars, setting a record auction price of $516,500 at Heritage Auctions in November 2018. His limited editions were published by Texas Art Press, and then from 1984 through 2015 they were published by Somerset House Publishing, with assistance from Gregory Editions on the hand-pulled pieces. He also did Western sculptures. His artwork was exhibited at the Smithsonian Institution, the National Archives Building and the Treasury Building in Washington, D.C. Notable collectors included Lyndon B. Johnson, the 36th president of the United States, John Connally, the 39th governor of Texas, and businessman Lloyd Donald Brinkman.

Jones was a significant donor to Focus on the Family, and its office in Washington, D.C., includes a gallery of his paintings. He did Christian-themed paintings for the organization, including Of One Spirit, depicting board members Hugo Schoellkopf, George Clark, Dr. Trevor Mabery and Reverend Creath Davis. A book published by Focus on the Family in 2002 suggests, "Apart from Dr. Dobson's father, James Dobson Sr., Focus on the Family is probably most closely associated with the Texas painter and sculptor Gerald Harvey Jones, commonly known as G. Harvey."

== Personal life ==
Jones married Patty Marie Bentley. They had a son, Gerald Jones Jr., and a daughter, Pamela. Together, they resided in Austin, Texas until they moved into the Weyrich-Arhelger House, an historic house in Fredericksburg, Texas, in 1985.

Jones died on November 13, 2017, leaving behind his wife, Patty, children, and four grandchildren. He was buried in the Texas State Cemetery in Austin. His estate was given to Vogt Auction Galleries in San Antonio, Texas to be auctioned off.
