= Doak Campbell Stadium =

Stadium

- "The House That Bobby Built"
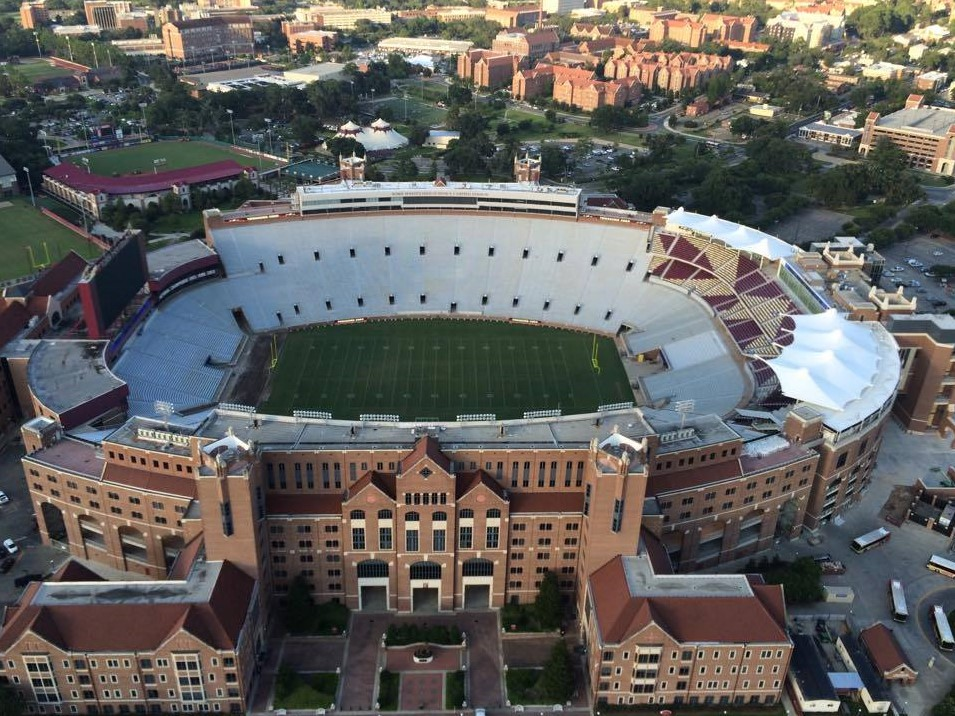
- Aerial view of the stadium, 2017

- Location in Florida Location in the United States
- Address: 403 Stadium Drive West; Tallahassee, Florida; United States
- Coordinates: 30°26′17″N 84°18′16″W
- Operator: Florida State University Athletics
- Capacity: 67,277 Former capacity List: 15,000 (1950–1953); 19,000 (1954–1960); 25,000 (1961–1963); 40,500 (1964–1977); 47,413 (1978–1979); 51,094 (1980–1981); 55,246 (1982–1984); 60,519 (1985–1991); 70,123 (1992); 72,589 (1993); 75,000 (1994); 77,500 (1995); 80,000 (1996–2000); 82,000 (2001–2002); 82,300 (2003–2015); 79,560 (2016–2023); 55,000 (2024); 67,277 (2025–Present)
- Surface: 419 Tifway Bermuda Grass
- Record attendance: 84,431 (October 18, 2014)

Construction
- Groundbreaking: June 1950
- Opened: October 7, 1950
- Expanded: 1954, 1961, 1964, 1977, 1980, 1982, 1985, 1992–1996, 2001, 2003, 2016, 2025
- Cost: $250,000 (in 1950) ($3.35 million in 2025 dollars)
- Architects: Ball-Horton & Associates Barnett Fronczak Architects; The Architects Collaborative (Renovations)
- General contractor: Jack Culpepper Construction Co.

Tenant
- Florida State Seminoles football (NCAA FBS) (1950-present); Florida A&M Rattlers football (NCAA FCS) (1974-80)

Website
- seminoles.com/doakcampbellstadium

Doak S. Campbell Stadium (in full Bobby Bowden Field at Doak S. Campbell Stadium), popularly known as "Doak", is a football stadium on the campus of Florida State University in Tallahassee, Florida, United States. It is the home field of the Florida State Seminoles football team of the Atlantic Coast Conference (ACC).

Opened in 1950, it was originally named Doak Campbell Stadium in honor of Doak S. Campbell, the university's first president. On November 20, 2004, the Florida Legislature added longtime head football coach Bobby Bowden to the stadium name to become Bobby Bowden Field at Doak Campbell Stadium. A petition in June 2020 sought to remove Campbell's name, as he resisted racial integration while president of Florida State University. FSU President John E. Thrasher asked Athletics Director David Coburn "to immediately review this issue and make recommendations to me." As of December 2025, no recommendations have been made.

The stadium is part of the University Center complex, a mixed-use facility encompassing university office space, university classrooms, the university's Visitor Center, souvenir store, The University Center Club, now known as the Dunlap Champions Club, and skyboxes and press boxes for use during football games.

With a capacity of 67,277 it is the 3rd largest stadium in the Atlantic Coast Conference, and the 26th largest stadium in the NCAA.

== History ==
The stadium, named after FSU President Doak Campbell, hosted its first game against the Randolph-Macon College Yellow Jackets on October 7, 1950, with the Seminoles winning the game 40–7. At that time the facility had a seating capacity of 15,000 in what roughly corresponds to the lower half of the current facility's grandstands. Florida State began to play at Centennial Field during the team's 1947 season and would continue to play there for the following two years (1948 and 1949). Florida State College – FSU's predecessor institution – also fielded teams from 1902 to 1904 (precise location of where games were played is not documented).

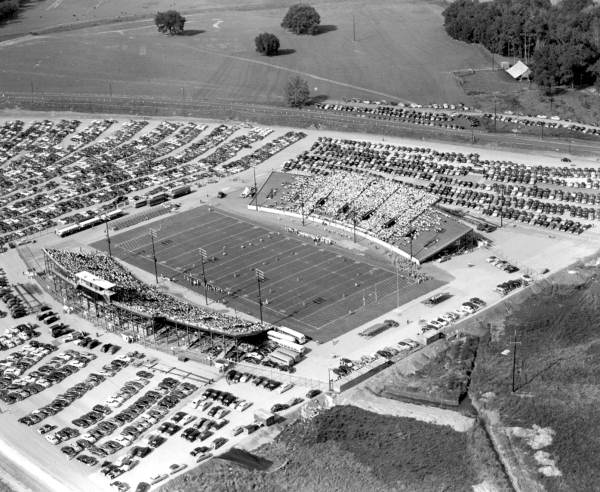
Aerial view of the dedication game during the inaugural season for FSU at Doak Campbell Stadium on October 7, 1950

Doak Campbell Stadium, with its original capacity of 15,000 in 1950, was built at a cost of $250,000. In 1954, the stadium grew to a capacity of 19,000. Six thousand more seats were added in 1961. During the Bill Peterson era (1960–70), the stadium was expanded to 40,500 seats, and it remained at that capacity for the next 14 years.

Since that time, the stadium has expanded to 82,300 before decreasing to 67,277 following stadium renovations in 2024. This was largely in part due to the success of the football team under head coach Bobby Bowden; the stadium's capacity more than doubled during his 33-year tenure. Its expansion was also coupled with the ever-growing student body. It now is the 2nd largest football stadium in the Atlantic Coast Conference (ACC). Aesthetically, a brick facade surrounding the stadium matches the architectural design of most of the buildings on the university's campus. In addition to the obvious recreational uses, The University Center surrounds the stadium and houses many of the university's offices. The field was officially named Bobby Bowden field on November 20, 2004, as Florida State hosted intrastate rival Florida. The FSU War Chant began during the Auburn game in 1983 and has since spread to be used by fans of the Atlanta Braves and Kansas City Chiefs.

=== Expansion and improvements ===
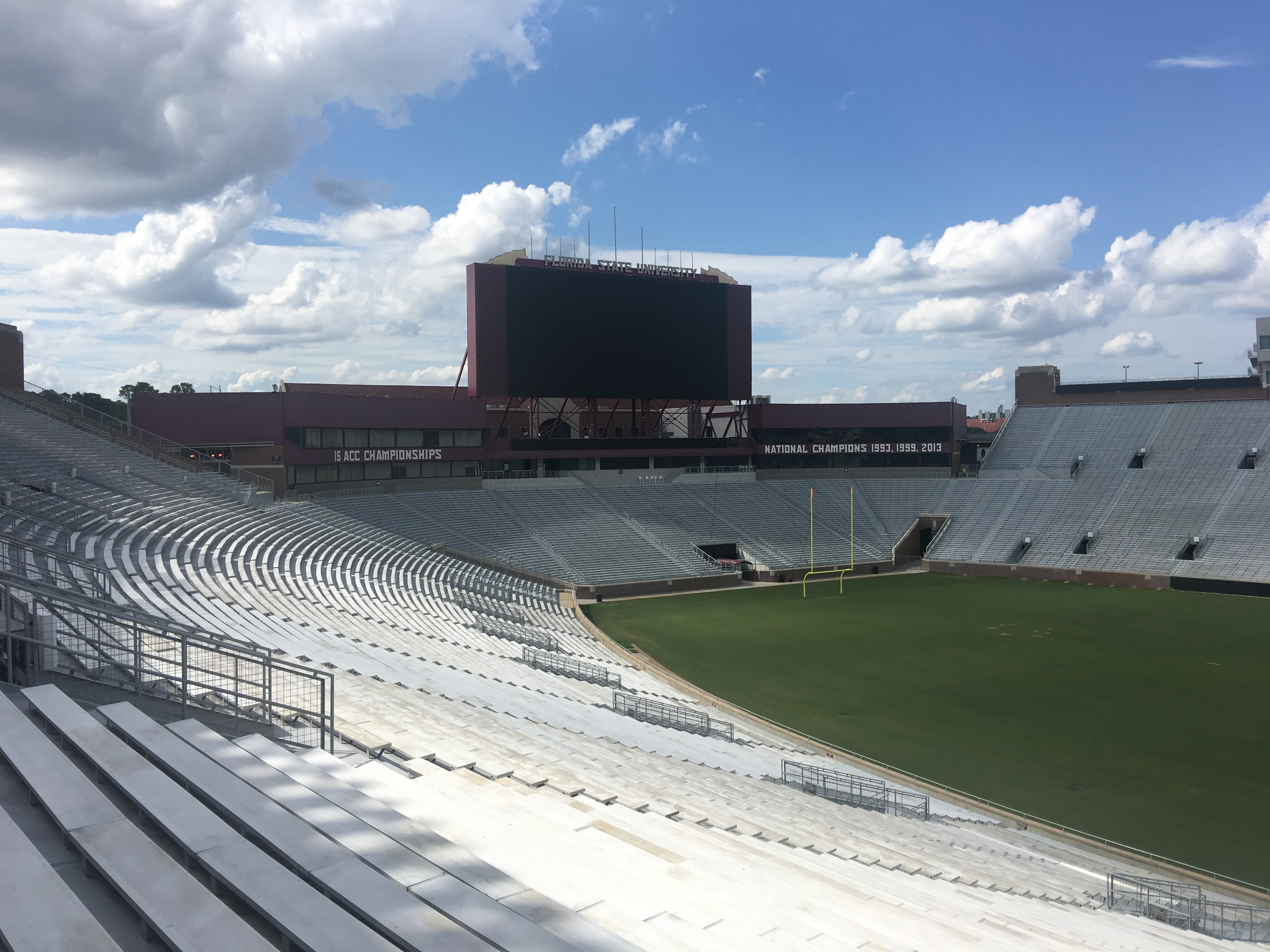
The scoreboard in the northern end zone

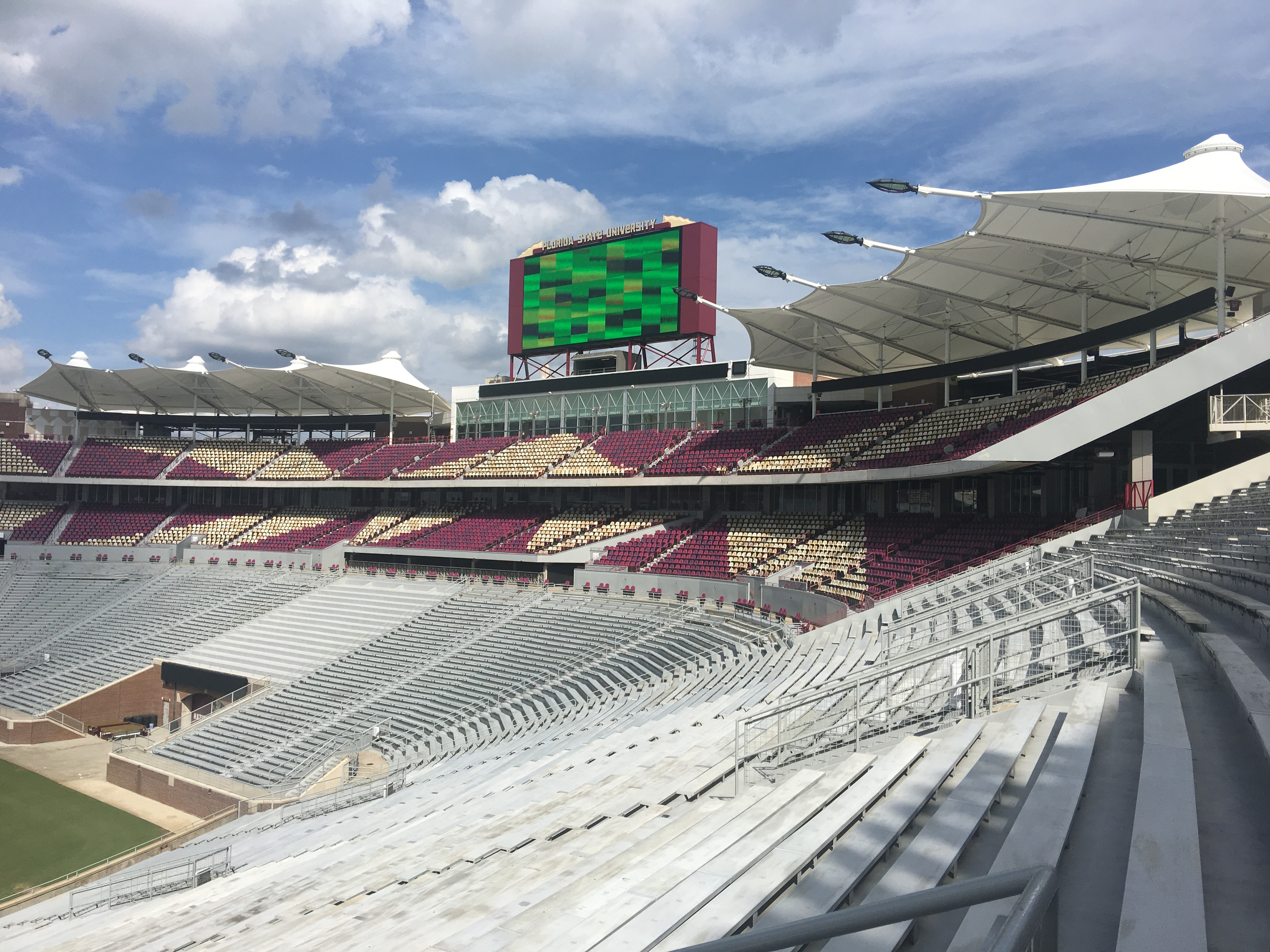
The Champions Club in the southern end zone

Following the latest expansion in 2003, the stadium has a seating capacity of 82,300. Prior to the start of the 2007 season, a new state-of-the-art sound and public address system was installed. Before the 2008 season, two new HD Scoreboards were installed; the main one in the north endzone measures over 100 ft (30 m), the south endzone has a 45-foot (14 m) scoreboard. Six new LED ribbon boards were installed in each of the four corners of the stadium as well as underneath the north scoreboard, over the player entrance and above the entrance used by the Marching Chiefs. The new boards allow for more game stats and more information on other games in addition to improved replay viewing. An indoor practice facility, adjacent to the stadium, was constructed in 2013.

The stadium was renovated in the first part of 2016 and opened in September, prior to the 2016 season.

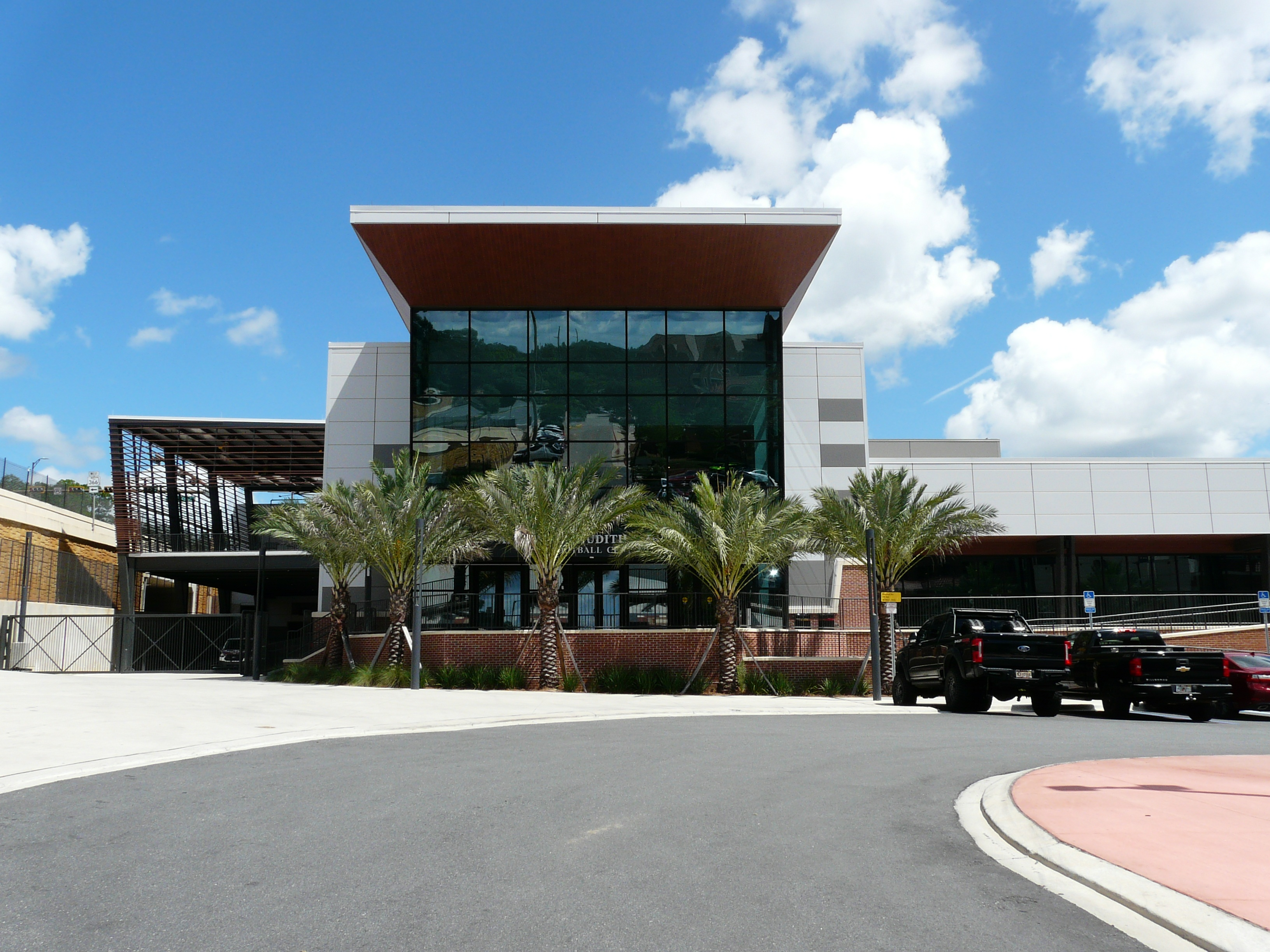
Albert J. and Judith A. Dunlap Football Center

In 2023, financial recommendations saw approval by the Seminole Boosters, Inc. Board of Directors. With further approval from the FSU Board of Trustees, improvements will come by widening seats on the east and west sidelines to 18 inches. In addition to widening aisles, handrails will be added as well and legroom upped to 34 inches in select areas. The total capacity of Doak Campbell Stadium is currently around 65-70,000 with the new renovations. During the 2024 season, the total capacity was decreased to around 50,000 people due to temporary seating. and renovations were completed prior to the start of the 2025 season.

== Largest attendance ==
Rank	Date	Attendance	Opponent	FSU Result
1	October 18, 2014	84,431	#5 Notre Dame	W, 31–27
2	November 2, 2013	84,409	#7 Miami	W, 41–14
3	September 17, 2011	84,392	#1 Oklahoma	L, 13–23
4	September 5, 2005	84,347	#9 Miami	W, 10–7
5	October 11, 2003	84,336	#9 Miami	L, 14–22
6	November 20, 2004	84,223	Florida	L, 13–20
7	October 16, 2004	84,155	#6 Virginia	W, 36–3
8	October 26, 2002	84,106	#12 Notre Dame	L, 24–34
9	November 30, 2002	83,938	#15 Florida	W, 31–14
10	November 5, 2005	83,912	NC State	L, 15–20

== Statues and stained glass ==
=== Unconquered ===
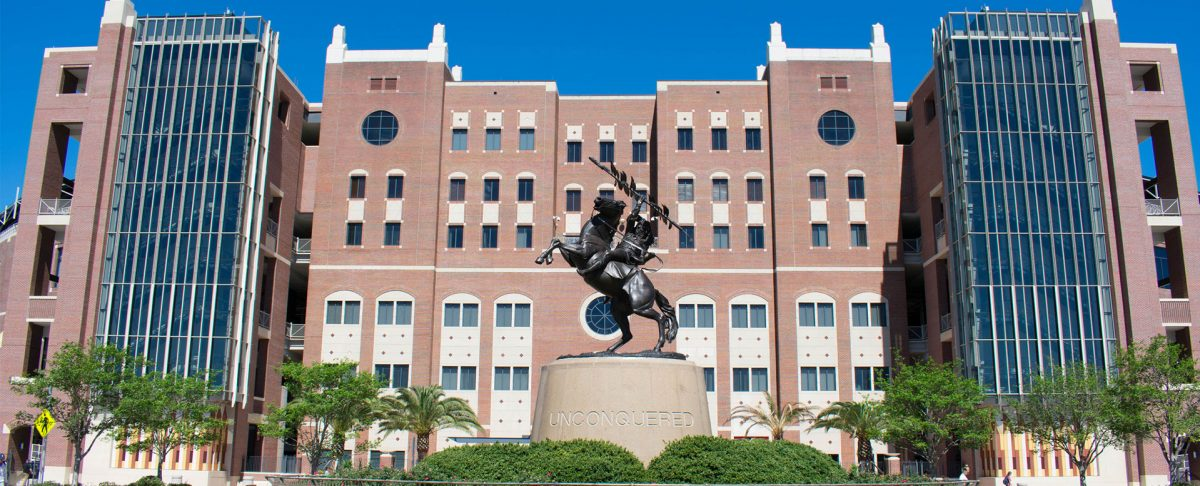
The Unconquered statue, located at the south entrance to the stadium

A 19-foot (5.8 m) tall bronze sculpture by Fritz White depicting Osceola and Renegade. A tradition was immediately put in place whereby at sunset, on the night before home football games, as the Marching Chiefs play, Osceola's spear is set aflame as students, alumni, and fans gather around the statue to show their support. The flame is later extinguished at sunrise on the morning following the game. As of March, 2006, the university decided to light the spear for several reasons, including: selection into the NCAA basketball tournament, "National Player of the Year" awards for any sport, conference championships, graduations and convocations, etc. A small inscription near the base of the statue reads: "This statue does not depict any particular person or event. Rather, it symbolically portrays the unconquered spirit of the Seminole people of the 19th century and the timeless legacy of that spirit that continues to burn bright into the future." The statue was unveiled at the Williams Family Plaza on October 10, 2003, and "Unconquered" was engraved in its stone pedestal on September 2, 2005.

=== Sportsmanship ===
A bronze sculpture by Edward Jonas, is a 15-foot (4.6 m) tall statue depicting a standing football player extending his arm to help up a fallen rival on the field. In 2002 it was selected by the National Sculpture Society to be showcased in its special "Sports Sculpture" exhibit. A one-quarter scale model represented the sculpture in the New York City exhibition. The statue is at the Al D. Strum Plaza.

=== Bobby Bowden sculpture ===
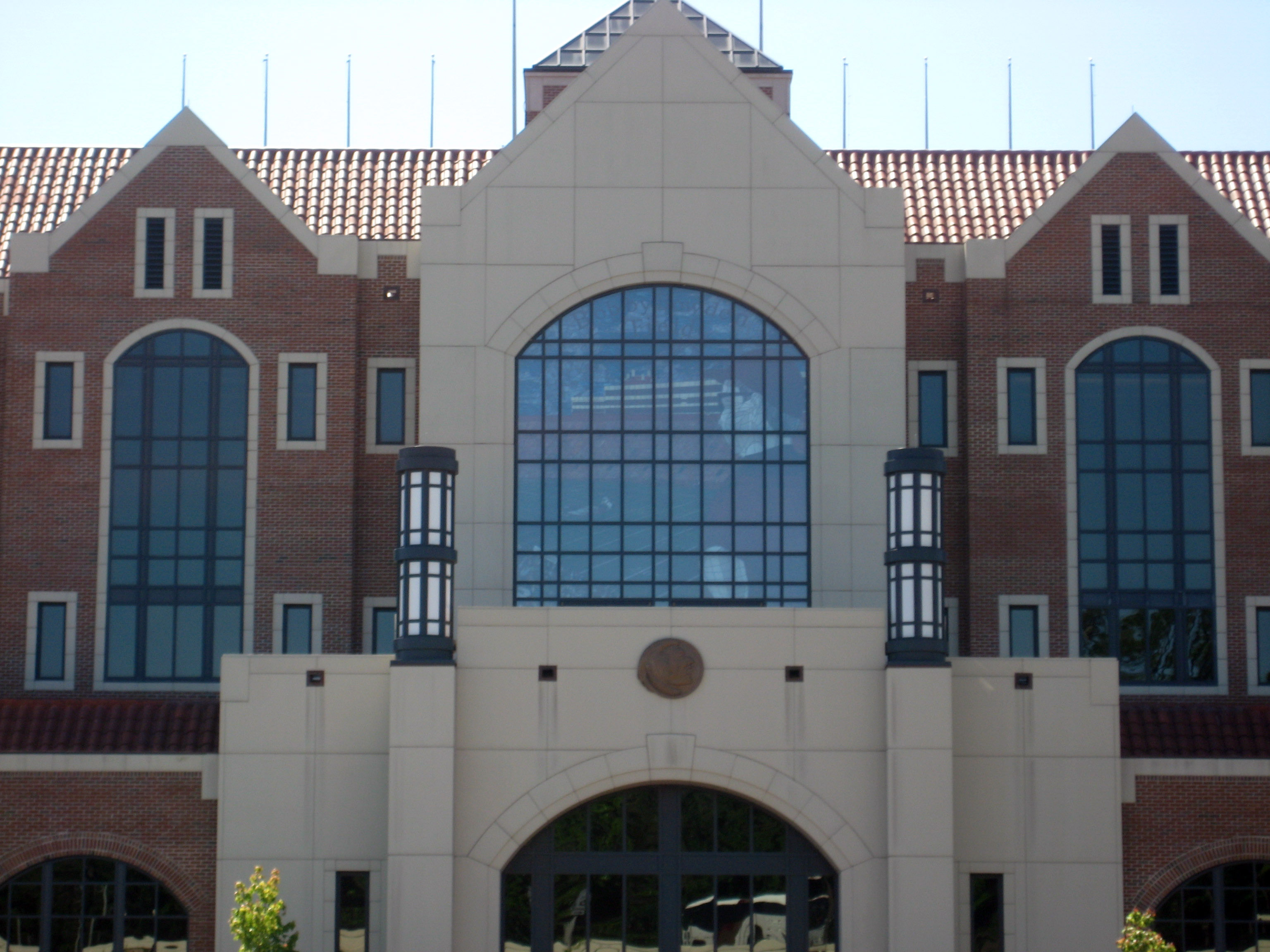
Bobby Bowden's Stained Glass window

A 9-foot (2.7 m) tall bronze statue of head football coach Bobby Bowden, created by W. Stanley "Sandy" Proctor, was unveiled outside of the Coyle E. Moore Athletic Center on September 25, 2004, and was dedicated along with the Les and Ruth Akers Plaza.

=== Stained glass window ===
A three-story, stained-glass window commemorating the naming of the field was unveiled on November 20, 2004, the day of the annual Florida State/Florida game. The window depicts Bowden overlooking the field among a sea of fans in the stands. The 30-by-20-foot (9.1 by 6.1 m) window was installed over the entrance of the Moore Athletic Center. Created by Florida State artist Robert Bischoff, his wife, JoAnn, and 12 Florida State students in the Master Craftsman Program, the window is among the five largest stained glass windows in the United States.

=== Seminole Family in Bronze ===
This new addition to the outside of the stadium was unveiled on October 20, 2006. The statue was designed by Brad Cooley Sr. and Brad Cooley Jr. of Lamont. Known as "Seminole Family in Bronze", the statue shows what may have been a typical Seminole family around the time of the Seminole Wars in the 1800s.

== University Center ==
Doak Campbell is a venue in collegiate football. It is contained within the brick façade walls of University Center, a complex built around the stadium, that houses the Registrar, the School of Hospitality, the College of Communications, and the College of Social Work, as well as numerous other offices and classrooms.

University Center A (East Wing)
Building A has two "towers" and houses the offices of the Registrar, Financial Aid, Admissions and others in one tower, and International Programs, the dean of students and the College of Motion Picture Arts, known commonly as the Film School, in the other. The Career Center was also located here until it is moved to the new Student Success Center. The top two floors are home to privately owned skyboxes.

University Center B (South Wing)
Building B holds the Seminole Sportshop as well as Visitor Services. UCB is also home to the Dunlap Champions Club and to the Kearny Osceola Grille. The Dedman School of Hospitality is located on the second floor of Building B.

University Center C (West Wing)
Building C like Building A, has two "towers" and is home to the College of Communication and Information, Florida State Testing Center as well as the College of Social Work. The Athletics Ticket Office is also located here as are many of the offices of the Seminole Boosters. Floor nine is home to the Press Boxes with two floors of Skyboxes below.

Moore Athletic Center (University Center D)
Located on the North Side of Doak Campbell, the athletic center houses nearly all of the athletic offices as well as some classrooms and lecture halls.

== Gallery ==
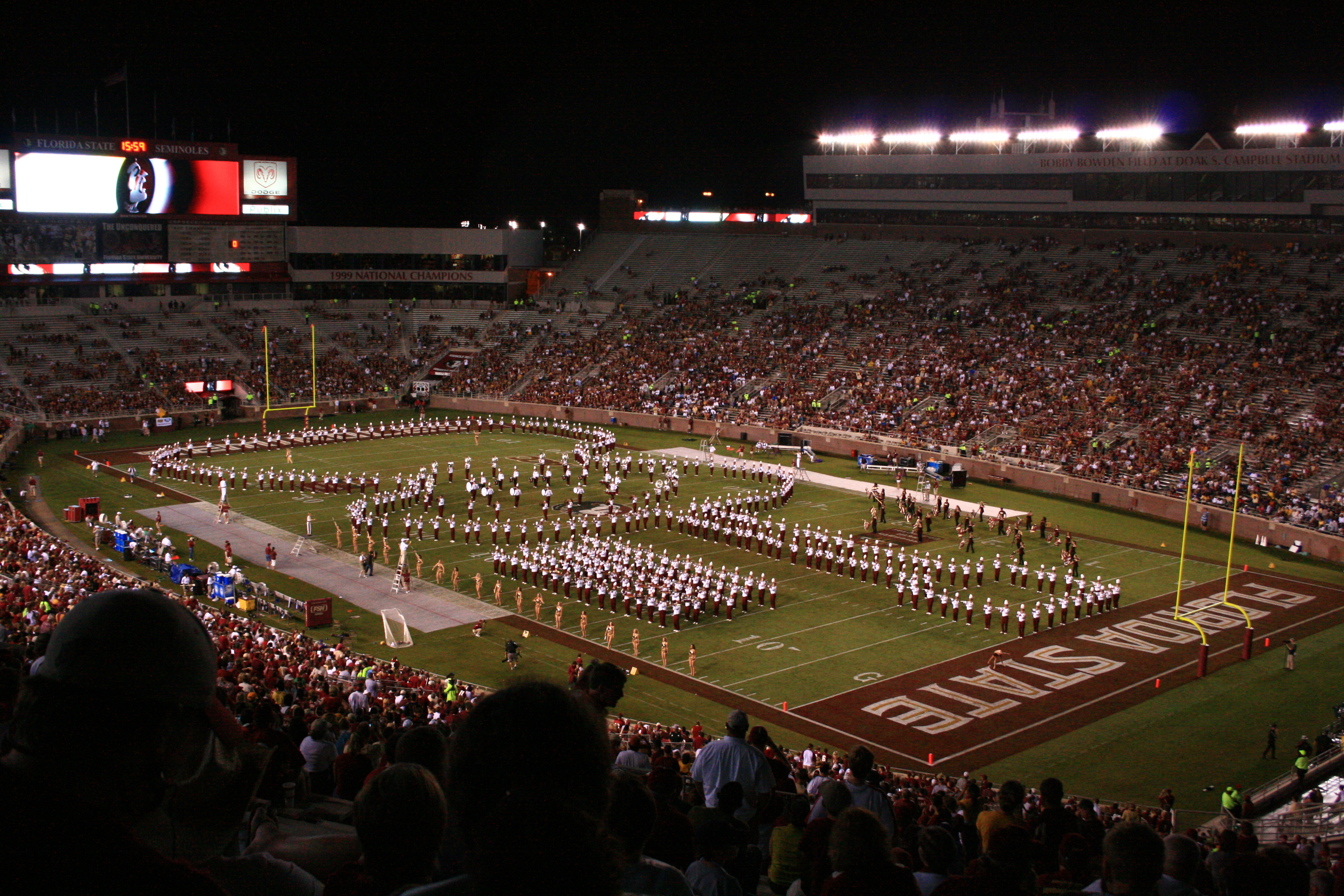
Marching Chiefs Show

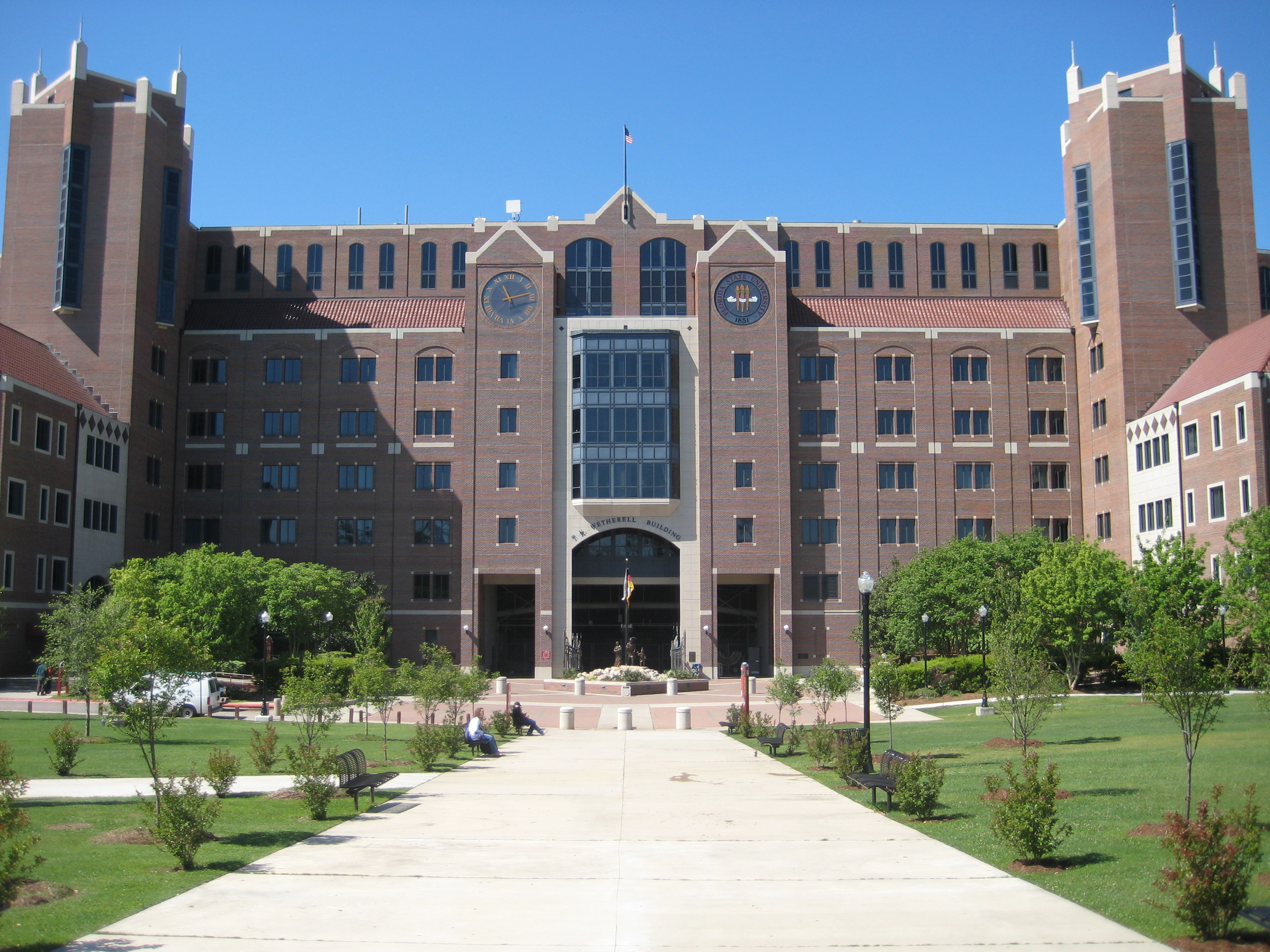
Stadium entrance

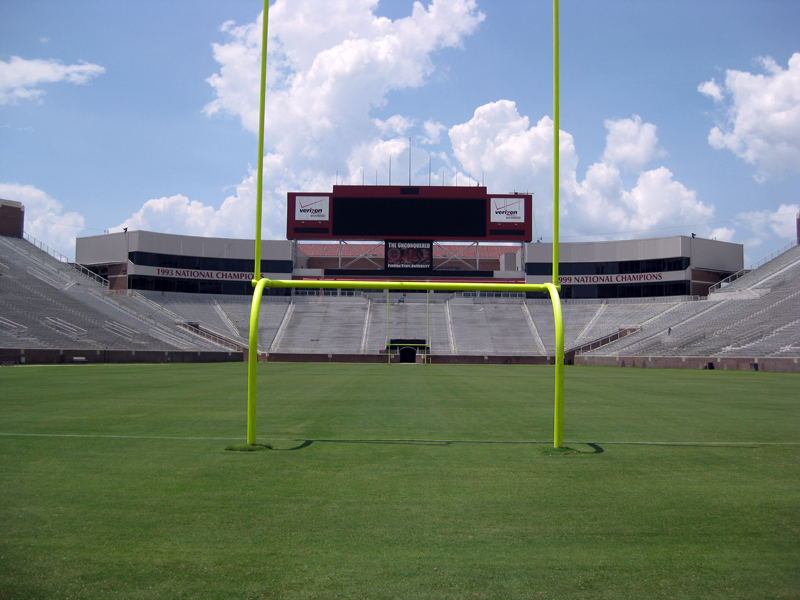
North end zone

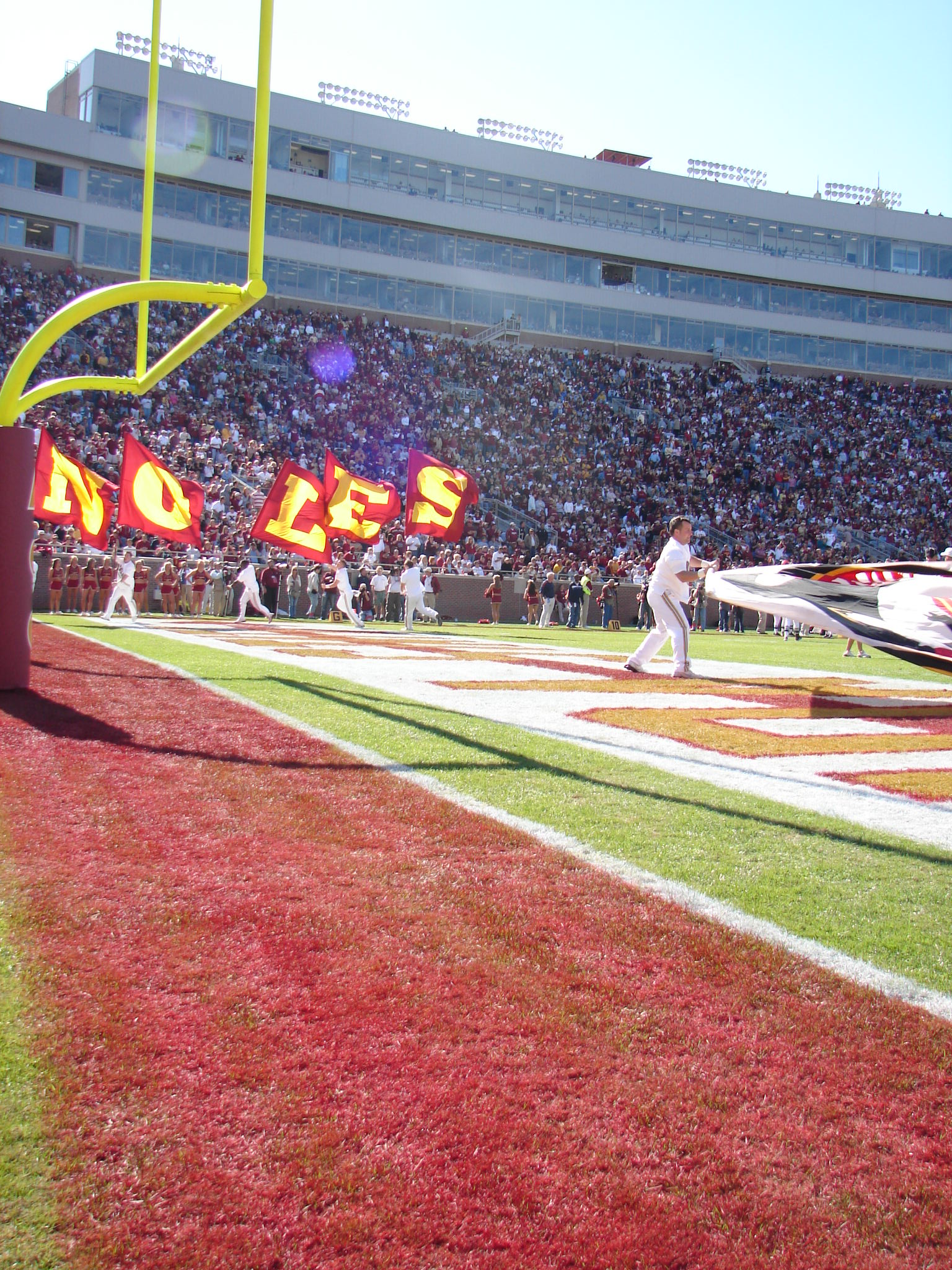
Sidelines during a game

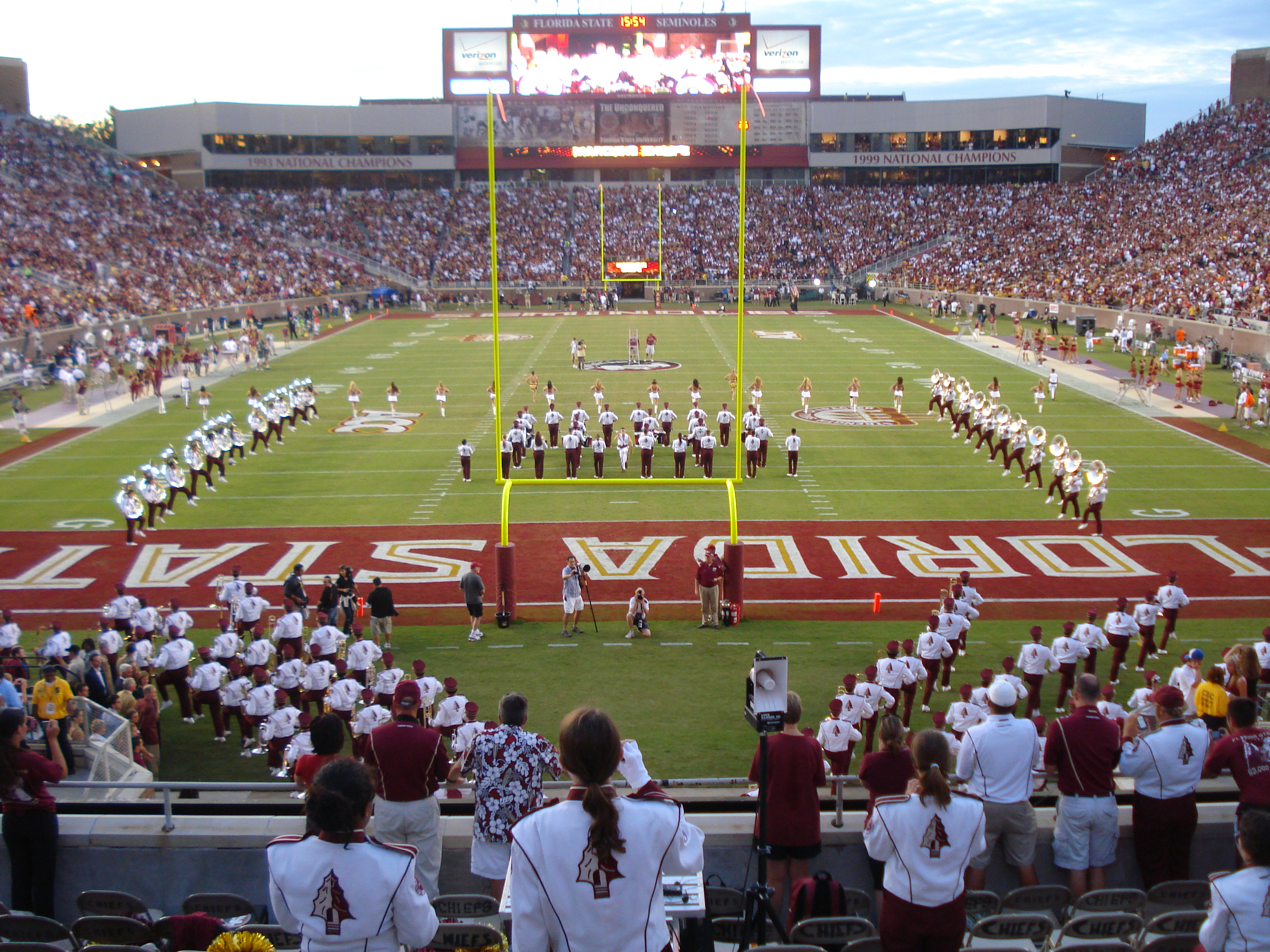
Pregame

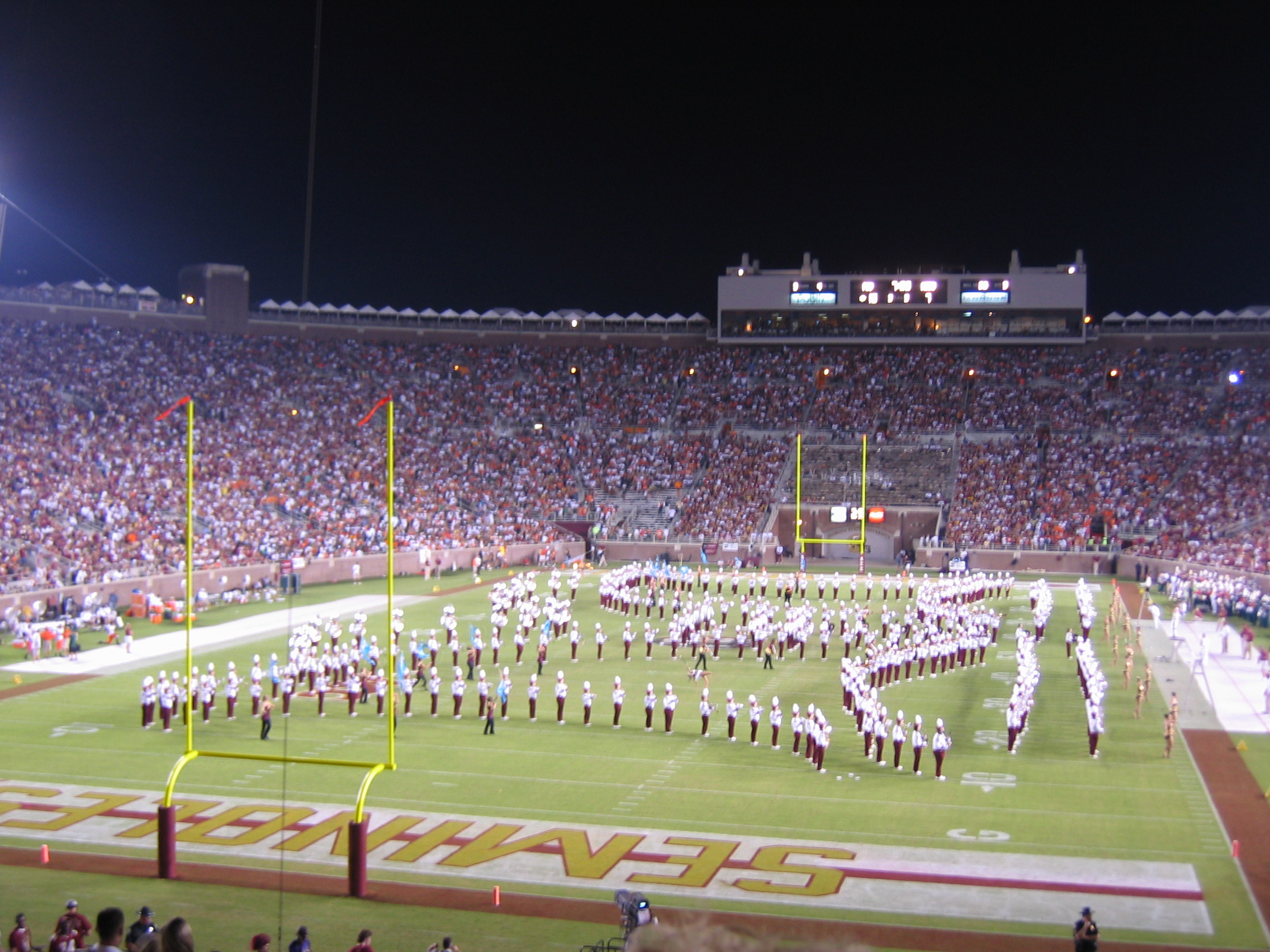
Halftime
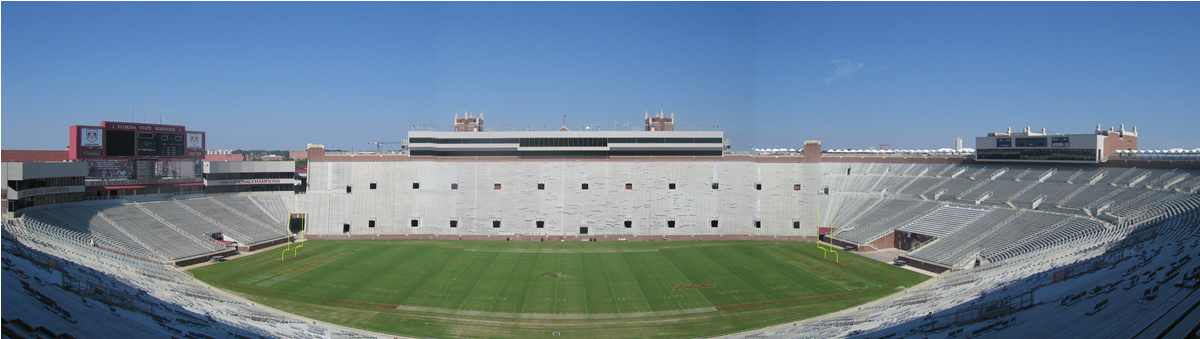
The field is named after former coach Bobby Bowden

== See also ==
- Florida State Seminoles
- Florida State Seminoles football
- List of NCAA Division I FBS football stadiums
