= Lloyd Donald Brinkman =

American businessman and art collector

- Born: 1929; Sheridan County, Montana, U.S.
- Died: July 4, 2015 (aged 85–86)
- Education: Pearl River Community College; University of Southern Mississippi
- Occupations: Businessman, cattle breeder, art collector
- Spouse: 7
- Children: 1 son, 1 daughter

Lloyd Donald Brinkman (1929 – July 4, 2015) was an American businessman, cattle breeder, civic leader and art collector. He was the owner of "the largest floor covering distributor in the US," and 350 pizza parlors with Gatti's Pizza. He bred Brangus cattle, and he was a significant collector of Western art.

== Early life ==
Brinkman was born in 1929 near Dagmar in Sheridan County, Montana. His grandparents were Danish immigrants who became homesteaders in the county.

Brinkman graduated from Pascagoula High School in Pascagoula, Mississippi. He attended Pearl River Community College and graduated from the University of Southern Mississippi, where he earned a bachelor's degree in Marketing in 1952.

== Business career ==
Brinkman initially worked in the flooring industry, even starting his own business in Dallas, Texas in 1960. It eventually became "the largest floor covering distributor in the US." Brinkman was also the owner of Gatti's Pizza, which operated 350 restaurants by the time he sold the business for $24 million in 2004.

Brinkman was also a breeder of Brangus cattle.

== Civic engagement and art collection ==
Brinkman was a co-founder of the Museum of Western Art in Kerrville. He served on the board of directors of the National Cowboy & Western Heritage Museum. He also served as the chairman of the public utility board of Kerrville, Texas. He was honored as the "Citizen of the Year" by the Kerrville Area Chamber of Commerce in 1984.

Brinkman was a collector of Western art. He owned paintings by American artists like Joe Beeler, E. Irving Couse, Frank Tenney Johnson, Gerald Harvey Jones, Robert Lougheed, Howard Terpning, and Olaf Wieghorst.

== Personal life, death and legacy ==
Brinkman was married seven times. He had a son, L.D. "Don" Brinkman Jr., and a daughter, Pamela Brinkman Stone .

Brinkman died on July 4, 2015. His collection of Western art is expected to be auctioned by Bonhams in Los Angeles in 2019.
