= James Kerr (Texas politician) =

American physician, politician, soldier and surveyor (1790–1850)

Texas Republic House, Third Congress
- In office 1838–1839

Personal details
- Born: September 24, 1790 Kentucky County, Virginia, US
- Died: December 25, 1850 (aged 60) Jackson County, Texas, US
- Spouse(s): Angela Caldwell, Sarah Fulton
- Namesake of Kerr County, Texas; One of the Old Three Hundred

James Kerr (September 24, 1790 – December 23, 1850) was an American medical doctor, politician, soldier and surveyor.

== Early life ==
Kerr was born on September 24, 1790, near what is now Danville, Kentucky, to a Baptist minister. Reared in Missouri, Kerr fought in the War of 1812 and was later sheriff of St. Charles County, Missouri. In 1818, he married Angeline Caldwell, the daughter of James Caldwell, Missouri's first House Speaker.

== Career ==
Kerr served in the Missouri House of Representatives during its first two terms after statehood. In 1824 he defeated his father-in-law in a race for the Missouri State Senate. He served a single term in the body.

Kerr was appointed Surveyor General of the Texas colony of Green DeWitt in 1825. With his wife, three children and several slaves, he joined Stephen F. Austin's "Old Three Hundred" colony in Brazoria. In August 1825, he set out to select a site for the Dewitt Colony. Kerr named the community Gonzales in honor of the governor of the Mexican state of Coahuila.

By this time, Angeline Kerr and two of the children had died. Kerr was active in area politics and law enforcement during the formative years of the Texas Republic. He acted as attorney and surveyor for Benjamin Rush Milam in 1827. He negotiated for peace before the Fredonian Rebellion, signed a treaty with the Karankawa Indians, and fought other tribes. In the Convention of 1832, he was the delegate from Port Lavaca at the Convention at San Felipe de Austin northwest of Houston. He also served as a member of the Second and Third conventions. In 1834, Kerr married the former Sarah Fulton.

Kerr became a major in the Texas Rangers in 1835 and in the army of the Texas Republic in 1836. He participated in the Battle of Lipantitlán on November 4, 1835.

Kerr was elected to the Third Texas Congress in 1838, where he represented Jackson County in the Texas House.

Kerr's later years were spent practicing medicine in Jackson County west of Houston. He died on December 25, 1850, aged 60, in Jackson County, Texas.

== Legacy ==
In 1856, pioneer Joshua Brown gave the land that became the Kerrville, named for Kerr.

== See also ==
- List of Convention of 1832 delegates
