= Mountaineer Baseball Field =

Baseball venue in Kerrville, Texas

Coordinates: 30.0334°N 99.12716°W

Mountaineer Baseball Field is a baseball venue located in Kerrville, Texas and home to the Schreiner Mountaineers of the American Southwest Conference.
