= James Avery Artisan Jewelry =

Company that designs, manufactures, and sells jewelry

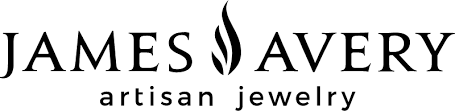
- Trade name: James Avery Artisan Jewelry
- Type: Private
- Industry: retail, jewelry
- Founded: 1954
- Founder: James Avery
- Headquarters: Kerrville, Texas, U.S.
- Number of locations: 400+
- Area served: United States
- Key people: Chris Avery (Chairman of the Board of Directors, former CEO)
- Products: Jewelry
- Services: jewelry design & manufacturing, jewelry engraving, hand enameled jewelry
- Number of employees: 3300
- Divisions: Store Locator
- Website: jamesavery.com

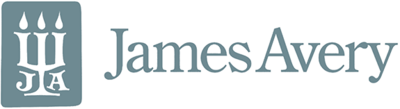
Previous logo

James Avery Artisan Jewelry is a family-owned jewelry company based in Kerrville, Texas. Founded in 1954 by James Avery, the company began in the Texas Hill Country and has grown into a multi-channel retailer known for jewelry that marks personal stories, traditions and life moments.

The company designs, manufactures and sells jewelry including charms, bracelets, rings, necklaces, earrings and gifts. James Avery operates more than 150 company-owned stores in seven states. According to the company, its jewelry is also available through JamesAvery.com and at Dillard’s and Von Maur locations across 36 states.

James Avery jewelry is designed in the Texas Hill Country, and the company reports that more than 90 percent of its pieces are crafted in Texas using the finest materials sourced worldwide. Its designs often center on themes of personal meaning, relationships, memories, faith, nature, and Texas heritage.

== History ==
James Avery started his business by selling jewelry from a wooden box at local summer camps in 1954. He became known as the “Jeweler in the Hills.”

In 1957, James Avery created 39 new designs for the line, printed his first catalog and hired his first employee, Fred Garcia.

In 1967, James Avery purchased 20 acres of land in Kerrville for his first store and manufacturing facility, where the company’s headquarters remain.

In 1969, James Avery designed a pin for the Apollo 12 astronauts to wear for their lunar mission. He was commissioned by NASA for two more missions, in 1989 and 1992.

In 1987, James Avery was commissioned to craft the silver communion vessels used by Pope John Paul II at mass in San Antonio.

In the 1990s, Chris and Paul Avery joined the company, working alongside and learning from their father, and went on to become leaders in the company. Chris served as CEO from 2007–2019 and became Chairman of the Board of Directors.

By 2000, James Avery Artisan Jewelry was operating 30 retail stores and had more than 1,000 associates.

In 2016, Lindsey Tognietti, James Avery’s granddaughter, joined the company. She started in retail and advanced to oversee customer service and brand marketing.

In 2018, James Avery’s founder passed away.

In 2021, March 24, The company opened its 100th store in Del Rio, Texas, on what would have been James Avery’s 100th birthday.

== Modern operations ==
The active collection of jewelry has more than 1,000 designs made from sterling silver, 14-karat gold and other materials, as well as precious and semi-precious gemstones.

More than 90 percent of the pieces are crafted in Texas using materials sourced worldwide. Common themes expressed with James Avery’s designs include faith, meaning, connection and men’s designs. The company also offers customization, allowing customers to personalize pieces by adding initials, birthstones, engraving, or other personal elements.

In addition to its retail stores, the company’s website, JamesAvery.com, has an online store. The company maintains a social media presence and its online services include Buy Online, Pick Up in Store, Create Your Own, sizing guides, wish lists and more. Finally, the company is dedicated to charitable giving and has several programs featuring fundraising, grants, partnerships, and education.
