= Art 2 Heart =

Non-profit organization

Logo

Art 2 Heart is a non-profit organization (EIN: 06-1685732) located in the Kerrville, Texas, United States that offering art, dance, music, song, and theatre programs for children aged 8–14.

== Programs ==
The Art 2 Heart runs an after school, outreach, and community service program that promote language and literacy growth. The program uses art, dance, drama, poetry and music as education mediums. It uses five character building pillars in the program which are Commitment, Responsibility, Accountability, Vision, and Example (C.R.A.V.E.) to accomplish its goals.

== History ==
Art 2 Heart was started in 2003, founded by Lorraine LeMon. Its office is located in the Doyle School Community Center in Kerrville, Texas.
