= Kerrville, Texas =

- City
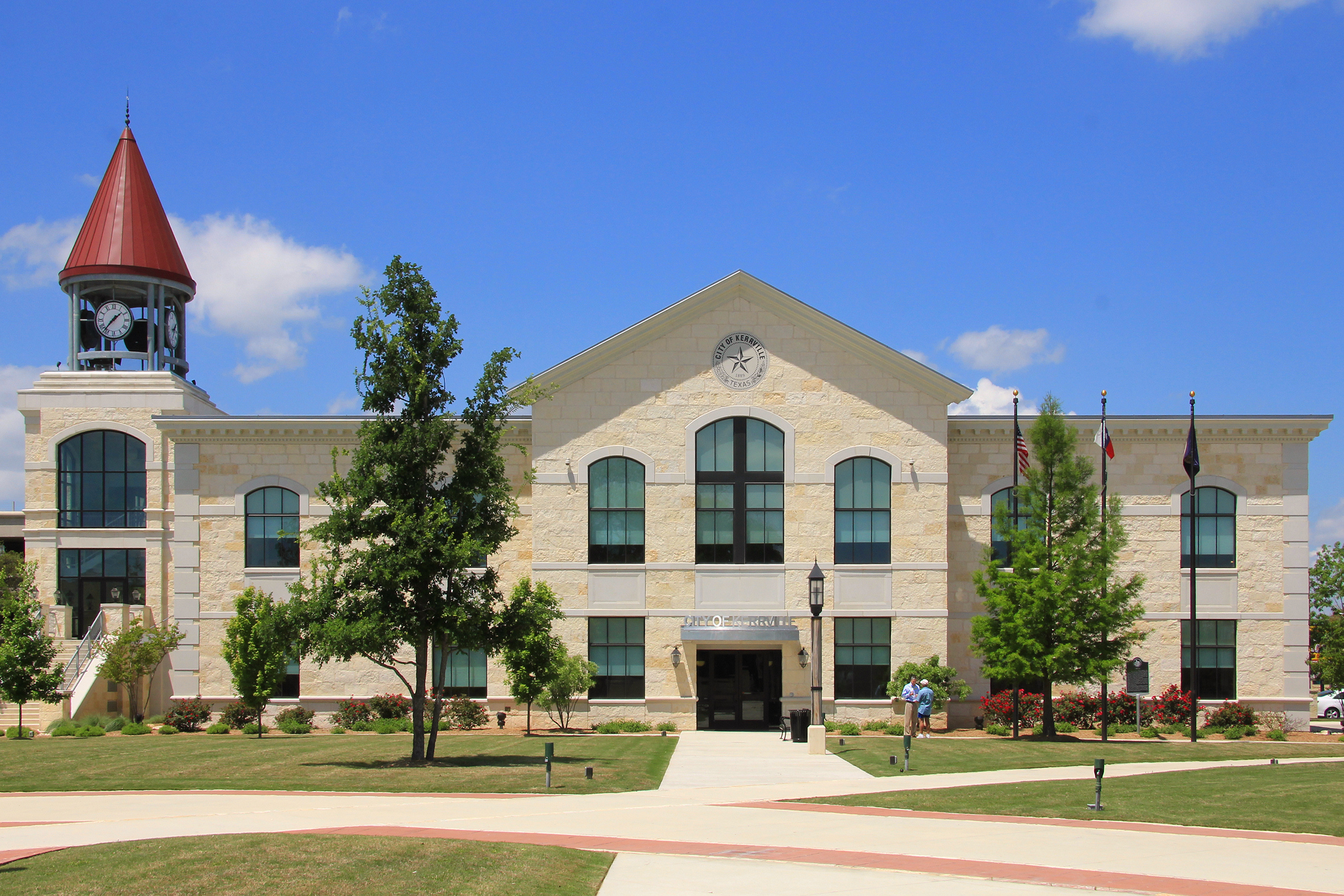
- Kerrville City Hall (2015)

- Location within Kerr County and Texas

- Location in the United States
- Coordinates: 30°02′51″N 99°08′26″W
- Country: United States
- State: Texas
- County: Kerr

Government
  - Type: Council–manager

Area
  - Total: 22.35 sq mi (57.88 km^{2})
  - Land: 21.93 sq mi (56.80 km^{2})
  - Water: 0.42 sq mi (1.08 km^{2})
- Elevation: 1,608 ft (490 m)

Population (2020)
  - Total: 24,278
  - Density: 1,107/sq mi (427.4/km^{2})
- Time zone: UTC−6 (CST)
  - Summer (DST): UTC−5 (CDT)
- ZIP Code: 78028–78029
- Area code: 830
- FIPS code: 48-39040
- GNIS ID: 2411538
- Website: kerrvilletx.gov

Kerrville c. 1900

Kerrville is a city in and the county seat of Kerr County, Texas, United States. The population of Kerrville was 24,278 at the 2020 census. The city is named after James Kerr, a major in the Texas Revolution, and friend of settler-founder Joshua Brown, who settled in the area to start a shingle-making camp.

Being nestled in the hills of the Texas Hill Country, Kerrville is best known for its parks that line the Guadalupe River, which runs directly through the city; its other features include nearby youth summer camps, hunting ranches, and RV parks. It is home to the Texas' Official State Arts and Crafts Fair, the Kerrville Folk Festival, the Kerrville Triathlon (since 2011), and the Kerrville Renaissance Festival (since 2017), as well as Mooney Aviation Company, James Avery Jewelry, and Schreiner University. The Museum of Western Art (founded 1983) features the work of living artists specializing in the themes of the American West.

== History ==
Archeological evidence (including burned rock middens, lithic artifacts, and Caddoan pottery pieces) suggests that humans lived in the area known as Kerrville as early as 10,000 years ago. Native American tribes in the area have included the Lipan Apache, Kiowa, and Comanche.

Early white settlers included successful shinglemakers whose mercantile business became a hub that served the middle and upper Hill Country area in the late 1840s. One of the earliest shinglemakers was Joshua D. Brown. With his family, Brown had led several other families on an exploration of the Guadalupe Valley. These early pioneers organized their settlements near a bluff just north of the Guadalupe River in the eastern half of the future county location. The settlement was referred to as "Brownsborough", but after the area was formally platted in 1856 by James Kerr, a major in the Texas Revolution, the settlement was formally known as "Kerrville" and maintained a county seat with Texas.

Starting in 1857, a German master miller named Christian Dietert and millwright Balthasar Lich started a large grist- and sawmill on the bluff. This mill established a permanent source of power and protection from floods, and became the most extensive operation of its kind in the Hill Country area west of New Braunfels and San Antonio. Soon afterwards, Charles A. Schreiner rode Kerrville's newly found popularity by serving Kerrville's mercantile needs. Schreiner established a family-run empire that helped build Kerrville's early prosperity by owning almost all of Kerrville's business sectors, including freighting enterprises, retail, wholesale, banking, ranching, marketing, and brokering operations. Schreiner's elegant downtown home, a Romanesque stone structure at 226 Earl Garrett Street, is the site of the Hill Country Museum in downtown Kerrville.

The Civil War slowed Kerrville's development, but with the start of the Reconstruction era, Kerrville's economic boom and ethnic diversification continued anew as demand grew in San Antonio for lumber, produce, and craftsmen. Kerrville's boom was also catalyzed by the combination of the cessation of Indian raids and the expansion into the business of cattle, sheep, and goat ranching. Cattle drives punctuated the boom years of the late 1880s and the 1890s. In 1887, the San Antonio and Aransas Pass Railway reached Kerrville, and in 1889, the town incorporated, with an aldermanic form of city government.

The Kerrville Water Works Company began to provide water for town dwellers in 1894. Telephone service was introduced in 1896, and the city began to pave streets in 1912. Kerrville adopted a "commission" form of city government in 1917, then changed to the "city-manager" form in 1928. In 1942, the town adopted a home-rule charter, while continuing with a city manager. Kerrville has displayed steady population growth throughout the 20th century, increasing from 1,423 residents in 1900 to 2,353 in 1920, 5,572 in 1940, 8,901 in 1960, and 15,276 in 1980. Its economic base has diversified and broadened through business, agriculture, light manufacturing, health care, transportation, services, education, the arts, and tourism. By the mid-1990s, the Wall Street Journal described Kerrville as one of the wealthiest small towns in America. By 1995, the city's official population was still under 18,000, with another 20,000 people in relatively affluent residential areas south of the river and the rest of the county. In 2000, its population reached 20,425. Much of the growth included retirees and young professionals and semiprofessionals; for many years, Kerrville also experienced significant emigration of young adults raised in the area.

== Geography ==
Kerrville is located in eastern Kerr County. Via I-10, it is 65 miles (105 km) northwest of San Antonio and 52 miles (84 km) southeast of Junction. SH 16 is the main road through the center of Kerrville. SH 16 leads northeast 24 miles (39 km) to Fredericksburg and southwest the same distance to Medina. SH 173 leads south 25 miles (40 km) to Bandera, while SH 27 leads west 6 miles (10 km) to Ingram and east 18 miles (29 km) to Comfort.

According to the United States Census Bureau, Kerrville has a total area of 20.7 square miles (53.7 km^{2}), of which 20.3 square miles (52.6 km^{2}) are land and 0.42 square miles (1.1 km^{2}) (2.00%) is covered by water. The Guadalupe River runs through the city, with the downtown area sitting on the northeastern side.

=== Climate ===
The climate in this area is characterized by hot, humid summers and generally mild to cool winters. According to the Köppen climate classification, Kerrville has a humid subtropical climate, Cfa on climate maps.

Climate data for Kerrville, Texas (1991–2020 normals, extremes 1897–present)
Month	Jan	Feb	Mar	Apr	May	Jun	Jul	Aug	Sep	Oct	Nov	Dec	Year
Record high °F (°C)	91 (33)	97 (36)	100 (38)	103 (39)	105 (41)	107 (42)	110 (43)	108 (42)	109 (43)	99 (37)	93 (34)	89 (32)	110 (43)
Mean maximum °F (°C)	78.9 (26.1)	82.7 (28.2)	86.6 (30.3)	90.7 (32.6)	94.5 (34.7)	97.5 (36.4)	99.2 (37.3)	100.5 (38.1)	97.1 (36.2)	91.4 (33.0)	83.2 (28.4)	79.0 (26.1)	102.2 (39.0)
Mean daily maximum °F (°C)	59.1 (15.1)	63.0 (17.2)	69.5 (20.8)	76.4 (24.7)	82.4 (28.0)	88.7 (31.5)	91.6 (33.1)	92.8 (33.8)	86.5 (30.3)	78.2 (25.7)	67.4 (19.7)	60.4 (15.8)	76.3 (24.6)
Daily mean °F (°C)	46.4 (8.0)	50.5 (10.3)	57.5 (14.2)	64.4 (18.0)	72.0 (22.2)	78.3 (25.7)	80.7 (27.1)	81.1 (27.3)	75.0 (23.9)	65.9 (18.8)	55.6 (13.1)	48.0 (8.9)	64.6 (18.1)
Mean daily minimum °F (°C)	33.8 (1.0)	38.0 (3.3)	45.4 (7.4)	52.4 (11.3)	61.6 (16.4)	67.9 (19.9)	69.8 (21.0)	69.3 (20.7)	63.4 (17.4)	53.7 (12.1)	43.8 (6.6)	35.7 (2.1)	52.9 (11.6)
Mean minimum °F (°C)	19.3 (−7.1)	21.7 (−5.7)	25.9 (−3.4)	33.7 (0.9)	45.3 (7.4)	58.4 (14.7)	64.0 (17.8)	62.1 (16.7)	48.9 (9.4)	34.1 (1.2)	25.2 (−3.8)	20.7 (−6.3)	16.5 (−8.6)
Record low °F (°C)	−7 (−22)	−5 (−21)	9 (−13)	22 (−6)	31 (−1)	40 (4)	51 (11)	46 (8)	35 (2)	21 (−6)	11 (−12)	−4 (−20)	−7 (−22)
Average precipitation inches (mm)	1.66 (42)	1.63 (41)	2.35 (60)	2.27 (58)	4.29 (109)	3.31 (84)	2.09 (53)	1.93 (49)	3.73 (95)	3.20 (81)	2.16 (55)	1.94 (49)	30.56 (776)
Average snowfall inches (cm)	0.1 (0.25)	0.2 (0.51)	0.0 (0.0)	0.0 (0.0)	0.0 (0.0)	0.0 (0.0)	0.0 (0.0)	0.0 (0.0)	0.0 (0.0)	0.0 (0.0)	0.1 (0.25)	0.1 (0.25)	0.5 (1.3)
Average precipitation days (≥ 0.01 in)	7.1	7.2	8.1	6.5	9.0	6.3	5.0	5.1	7.1	7.3	6.7	7.3	82.7
Average snowy days (≥ 0.1 in)	0.1	0.2	0.0	0.0	0.0	0.0	0.0	0.0	0.0	0.0	0.1	0.1	0.5
Source: NOAA

== Demographics ==
Historical population
Census	Pop.	Note	%±
1880	156		—
1890	1,044		569.2%
1900	1,423		36.3%
1910	1,843		29.5%
1920	2,353		27.7%
1930	4,546		93.2%
1940	5,572		22.6%
1950	7,691		38.0%
1960	8,901		15.7%
1970	12,672		42.4%
1980	15,276		20.5%
1990	17,384		13.8%
2000	20,425		17.5%
2010	22,347		9.4%
2020	24,278		8.6%
U.S. Decennial Census

=== 2020 census ===
As of the 2020 census, Kerrville had a population of 24,278. The median age was 48.4 years; 17.2% of residents were under 18 and 30.6% were 65 or older. For every 100 females, there were 90.1 males, and for every 100 females 18 and over, there were 87.3 males 18 and over.

Almost all of the residents lived in urban areas, while only 2.5% lived in rural areas.

Of the 10,392 households in Kerrville, 21.9% had children under 18 living in them, 41.5% were married-couple households, 18.9% were households with a male householder and no spouse or partner present, and 33.9% were households with a female householder and no spouse or partner present. About 36.4% of all households were made up of individuals, and 21.3% had someone living alone who was 65 or older.

The city had 11,439 housing units, of which 9.2% were vacant. The homeowner vacancy rate was 2.0% and the rental vacancy rate was 7.7%.

Racial composition as of the 2020 census
Race	Number	Percent
White	17,956	74.0%
Black or African American	599	2.5%
American Indian and Alaska Native	143	0.6%
Asian	389	1.6%
Native Hawaiian and other Pacific Islander	29	0.1%
Some other race	1,913	7.9%
Two or more races	3,249	13.4%
Hispanic or Latino (of any race)	6,762	27.9%

=== 2000 census ===
As of the census of 2000, 20,425 people, 8,563 households, and 5,411 families resided in the city. The population density was 1,222.5 inhabitants per square mile (472.0/km^{2}). The 9,477 housing units averaged 567.2 per square mile (219.0/km^{2}). The racial makeup of the city was 85.89% White, 2.99% African American, 0.55% Native American, 0.57% Asian, 0.08% Pacific Islander, 8.20% from other races, and 1.73% from two or more races. Hispanics or Latinos of any race were 22.73% of the population.

Of the 8,563 households, 8.9% had children under 18 living with them, 49.8% were married couples living together, 10.2% had a female householder with no husband present, and 36.8% were not families. About 33.1% of all households were made up of individuals, and 19.4% had someone living alone who was 65 or older. The average household size was 2.21, and the average family size was 2.79.

In the city, the population was distributed as 21.0% under 18, 8.0% from 18 to 24, 21.3% from 25 to 44, 20.4% from 45 to 64, and 29.3% who were 65 or older. The median age was 45 years. For every 100 females, there were 87 males. For every 100 females 18 and over, there were 83.0 males.

The median income for a household in the city was $32,085 and for a family was $38,979. Males had a median income of $27,555 versus $19,923 for females. The per capita income for the city was $20,193. About 11.7% of families and 15.6% of the population were below the poverty line, including 25.8% of those under 18 and 7.8% of those 65 or over.

== Culture ==
The Kerrville Folk Festival is an annual summer festival, which features folk musicians. Kerrville is home to the annual Texas State Arts and Crafts Fair, which features artisans and entertainers. The Texas Lions Camp and Echo Hill Ranch Summer Camp are also located in Kerrville.

Kerrville hosted the Olympic trials for shooting sports for the 2012 Summer Olympics at the Hill Country Shooting Center.

On Saturday, October 15, 2023, Kerrville experienced a annular solar eclipse of the sun. Six months later, on Monday, April 8, 2024, the Kerrville Eclipse Festival celebrated the annular solar eclipse of the sun.

== Education ==
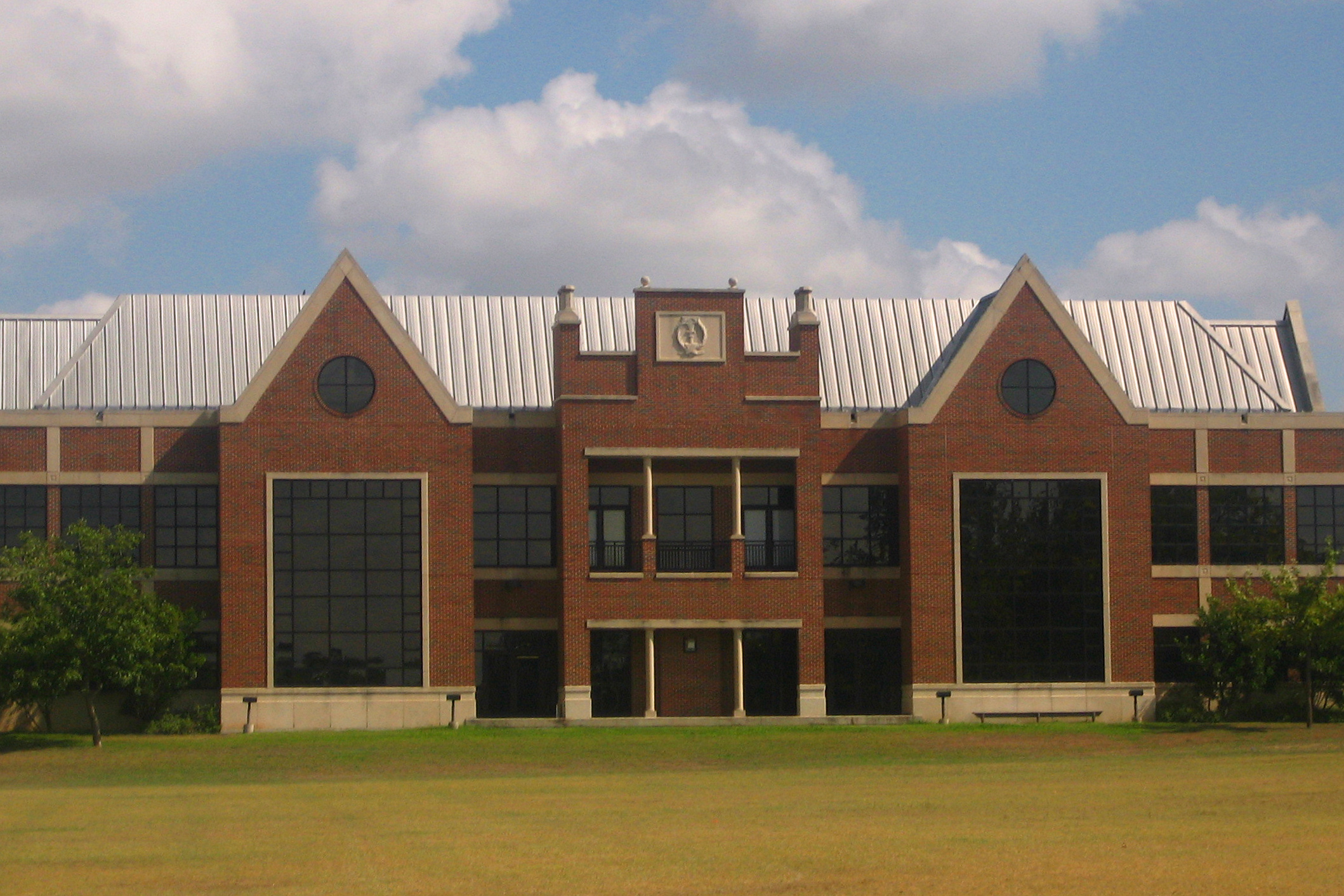
Main building on Schreiner University campus

Kerrville is served by the Kerrville Independent School District, which maintains four elementary schools (Tally, Nimitz, Starkey, and Daniels), one middle school (Peterson), and two high schools (Hill Country High School and Kerrville (TX) Tivy). Our Lady of the Hills Catholic High School and Notre Dame Catholic School and Grace Academy of Kerrville are also located in Kerrville, serving as the primary alternative to the public school system.

Kerrville is home to Schreiner University, a private, four-year university that was established in 1923 by an ex-Texas Ranger, Captain Charles Schreiner.

Until 2020, Schreiner University was also home to Greystone Preparatory School. Greystone offered a one-year preparatory course to help individuals prepare for an appointment to one of the five federal service academies. Since the departure of Greystone, Schreiner Institute was created to fill this role. Directed by a staff of former military officers, the program has since been designated as one of six West Point-approved associate of Graduates Scholarship Programs.

== Infrastructure ==
=== Nonprofit/service organizations ===
The TaxExemptWorld.com website, which compiles Internal Revenue Service data, reported that in 2013, 465 distinct, active, tax-exempt/nonprofit organizations were in Kerrville, excluding credit unions, had a total income of $414 million and assets of $959 million. One example of a performing arts nonprofit organization in Kerrville would be Art 2 Heart. Seventy-three churches are in or near Kerrville.

=== Transportation ===
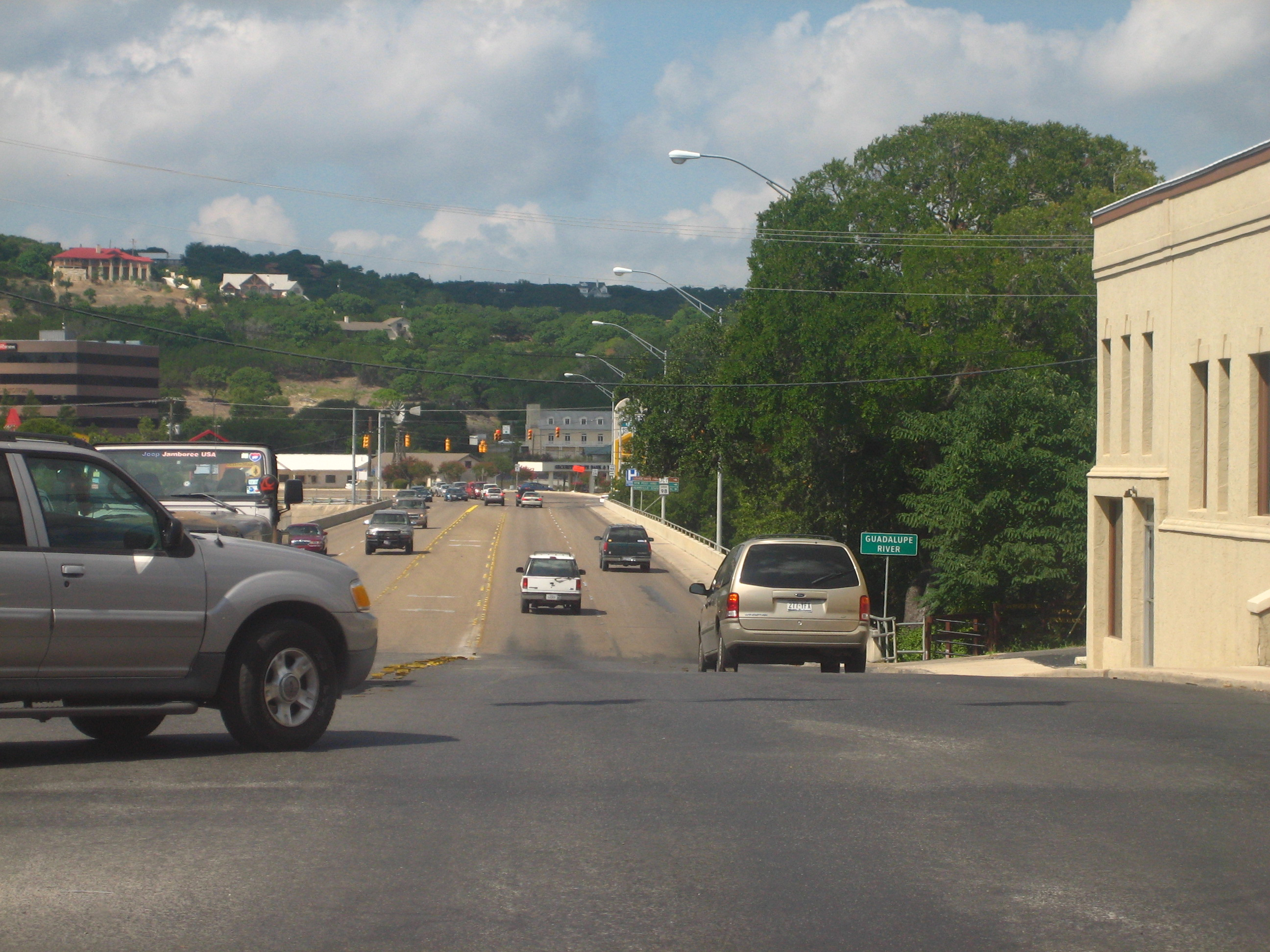
Bridge over the Guadalupe River in Kerrville

==== Interstate highways ====
- I-10

==== State highways ====
- SH 16 (Medina Highway, Sidney Baker Highway, Fredericksburg Road)
- SH 27 (Junction Highway, Main Street, Broadway Avenue)
- SH 173 (Bandera Highway)

==== Loops ====
- Loop 534 (Veterans Highway)

==== Farm-to-Market roads ====
- RM 783 (Harper Road)
- FM 1338 (Goat Creek Road)
- FM 1341 (Golf Avenue, Cypress Creek Road)

==== Bicycle routes ====
Adventure Cycling Association Southern Tier Bicycle Route

== People ==
=== Sports ===
- Mike Dyal, professional football player from 1989 to 1993
- Tony Lorick, running back for the Baltimore Colts and New Orleans Saints
- John Mahaffey, professional golfer who won the 1978 PGA Championship
- Johnny Manziel, football player, 2012 Heisman Trophy winner
- Gary Phillips, NBA player for the Boston Celtics and Golden State Warriors
- John Teltschik, player for the Philadelphia Eagles from 1986 to 1990

=== Entertainment ===
- Thomas Haden Church, actor (George of the Jungle, Sideways, Spider-Man 3, and Heaven Is for Real)
- Robert Earl Keen, singer and songwriter
- Ace Reid, artist and humorist, lived in Kerrville from the early 1950s until his death in 1991.
- Jimmie Rodgers, the "Father of Country Music", called Kerrville home for his family.
- Stacy Sutherland, guitarist for the 13th Floor Elevators, is buried in Center Point Cemetery.
- Alexandra Underwood, Wilhelmina model and contestant of America's Next Top Model
- John Ike Walton, drummer for the 13th Floor Elevators

=== Business ===
- James Avery, owner of James Avery Jewelers (founded in 1954)
- Lloyd Donald Brinkman, owner of floor-covering distributorship, Brangus cattle breeder
- Florence Butt, founder of H-E-B grocery stores in 1905

=== Others ===
- Lyle Brummett, serial killer
- Konni Burton, Republican member of the Texas State Senate from Tarrant County
- Kinky Friedman, Texas musician, politician, and iconoclast
- Jesse Edward Grinstead, author of Western fiction and owner, editor of The Kerrville Mountain Sun
- Harvey Hilderbran, Republican state representative from Kerr County, 1989–2015
- Fleet Admiral Chester W. Nimitz, lived in Kerrville in his youth
- James E. Nugent, member of the Texas House of Representatives
- Lou Halsell Rodenberger, a Texas author, lived in Kerrville in the 1940s.

== Points of interest ==
- Kerrville Folk Festival
- Kerrville Kroc Center
- Kerrville-Schreiner Park
- Mountaineer Baseball Field
- Museum of Western Art
- Riverside Nature Center
- Capt. Charles Schreiner Mansion
- Schreiner University

=== Gallery ===
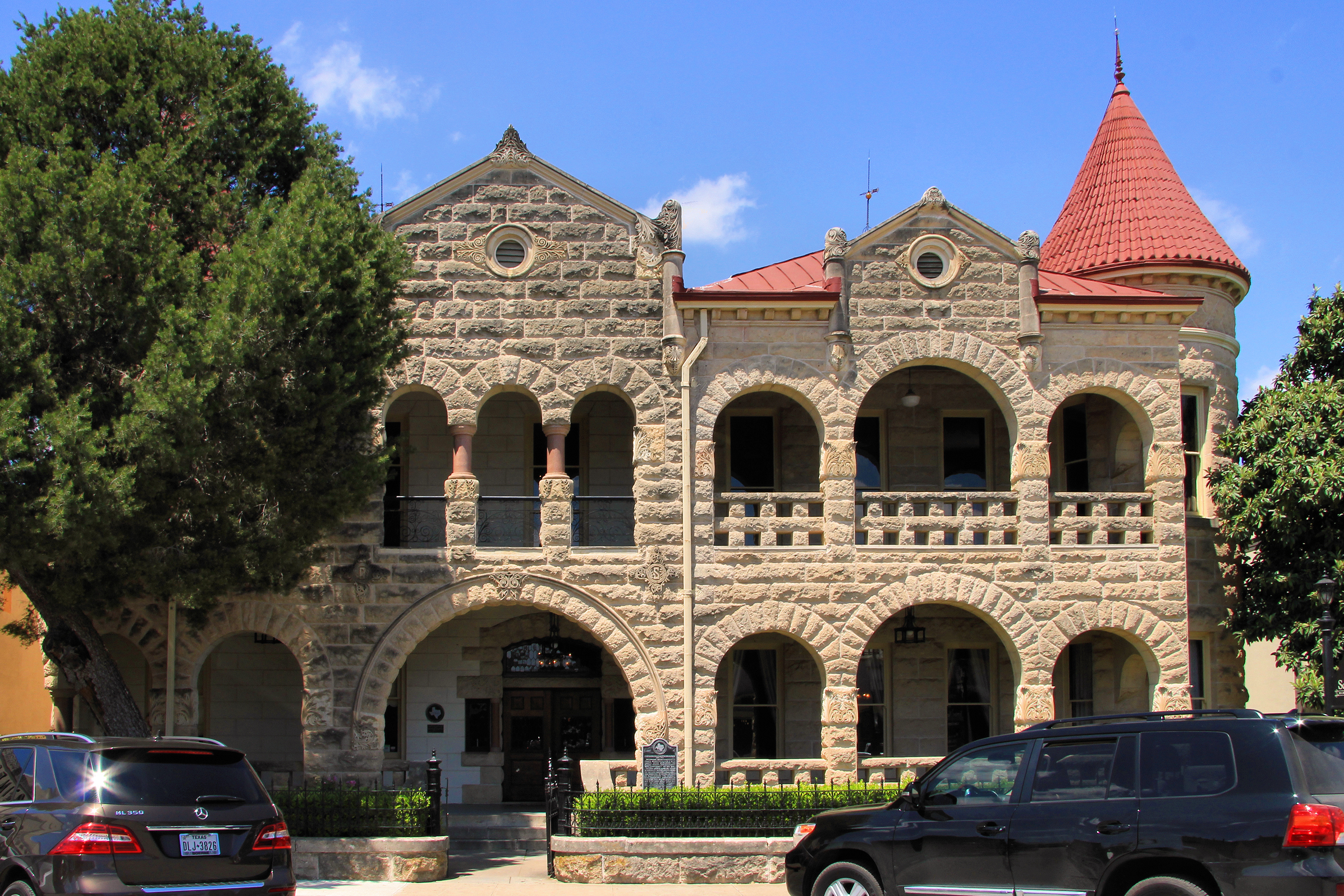
The Capt. Charles Schreiner Mansion Historic Site and Education Center in downtown Kerrville was originally the home of Charles Schreiner

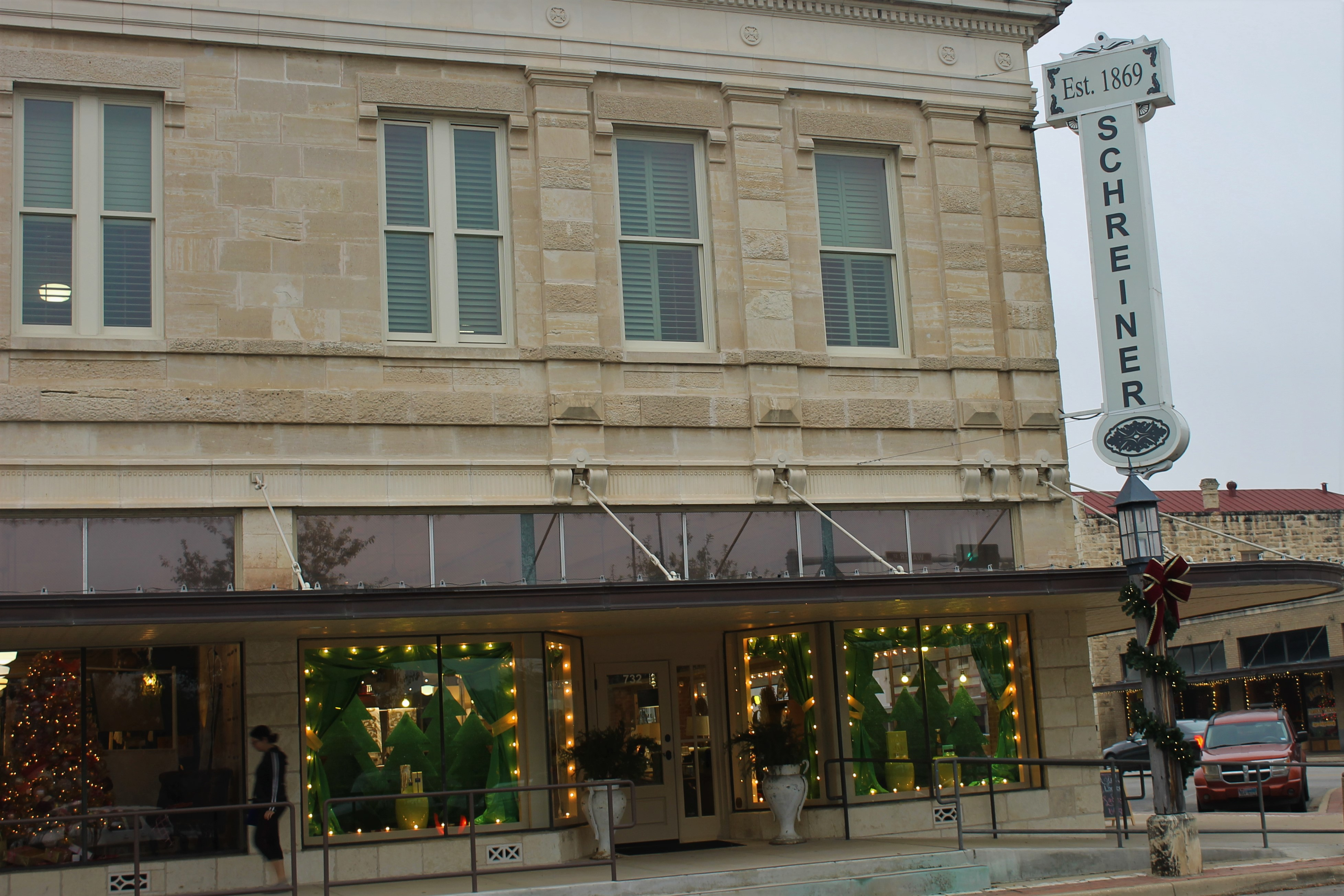
Schreiner's Department Store, the mainstay of downtown Kerrville

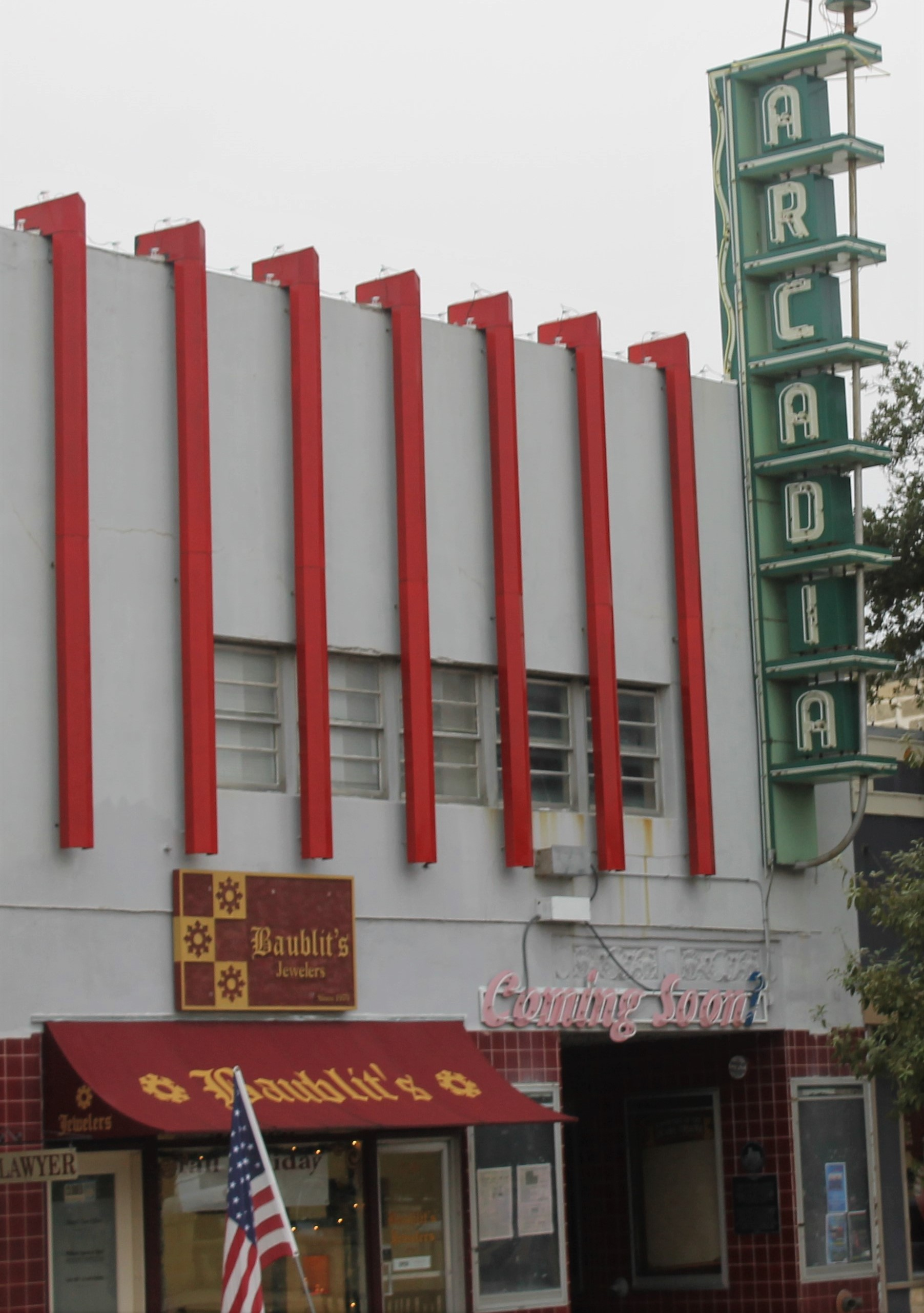
The Arcadia Theatre at 717 Water St. in Kerrville was built in Spanish style in 1926 and renovated as Art Deco in 1948. It closed in 1989 and remained so until it was renovated once again in 2019.

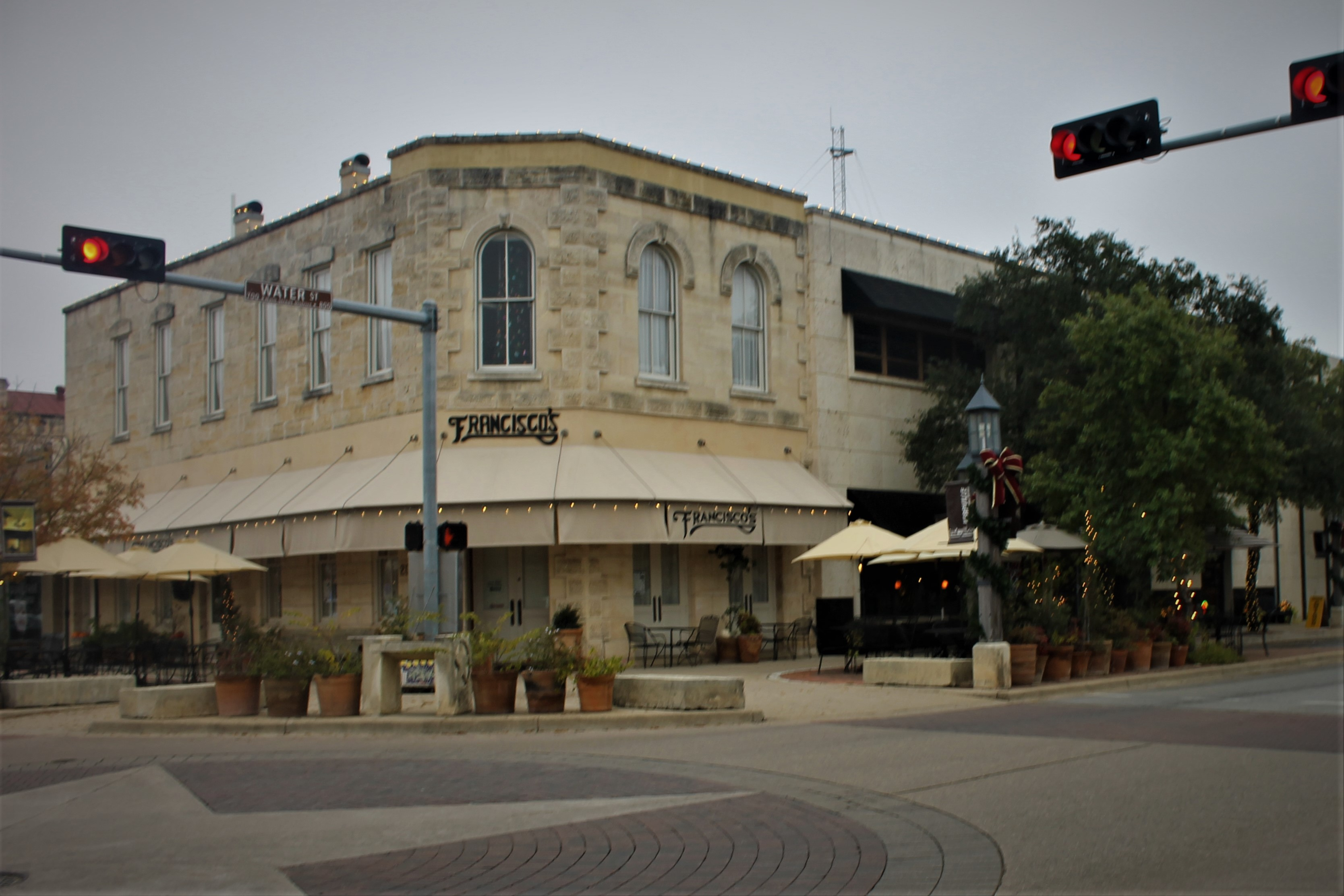
Francisco's Restaurant at 201 Earl Garrett St., intersecting Water Street, in the Kerrville downtown square

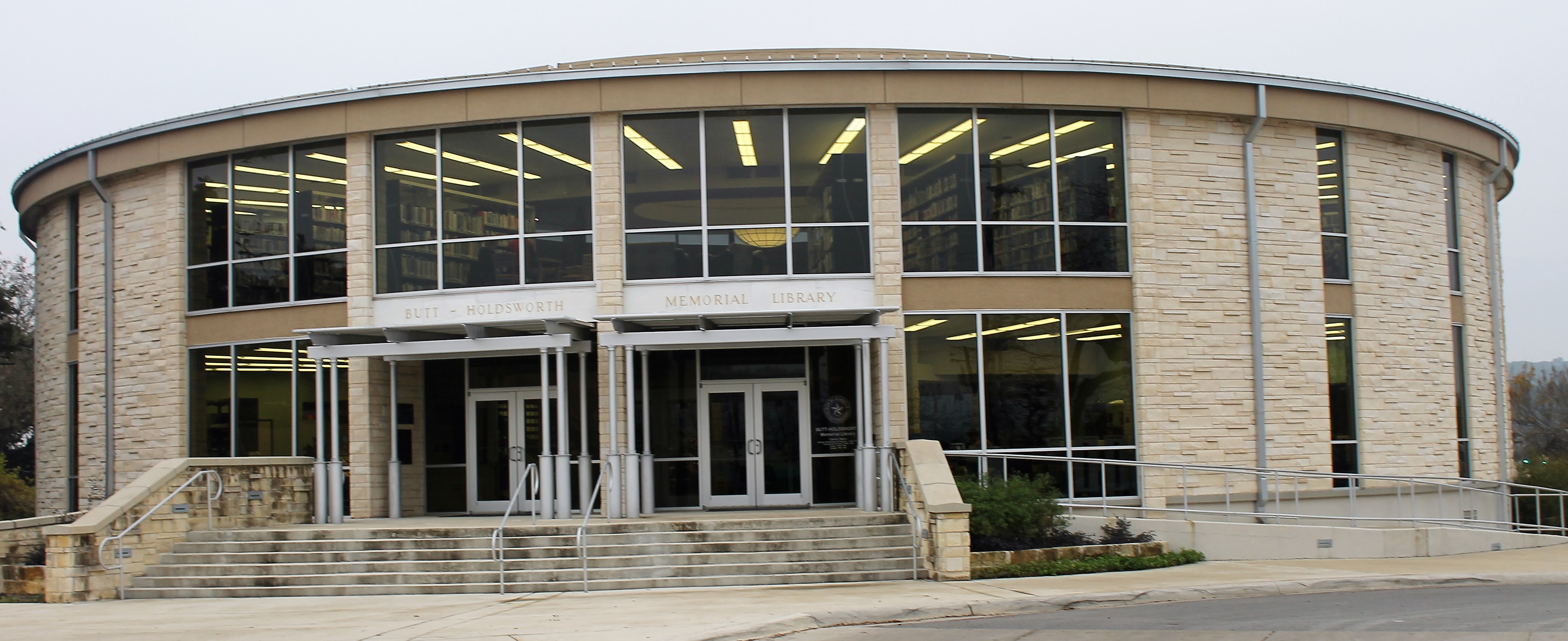
Butt-Holdsworth Memorial Library at 505 Water St. in Kerrville

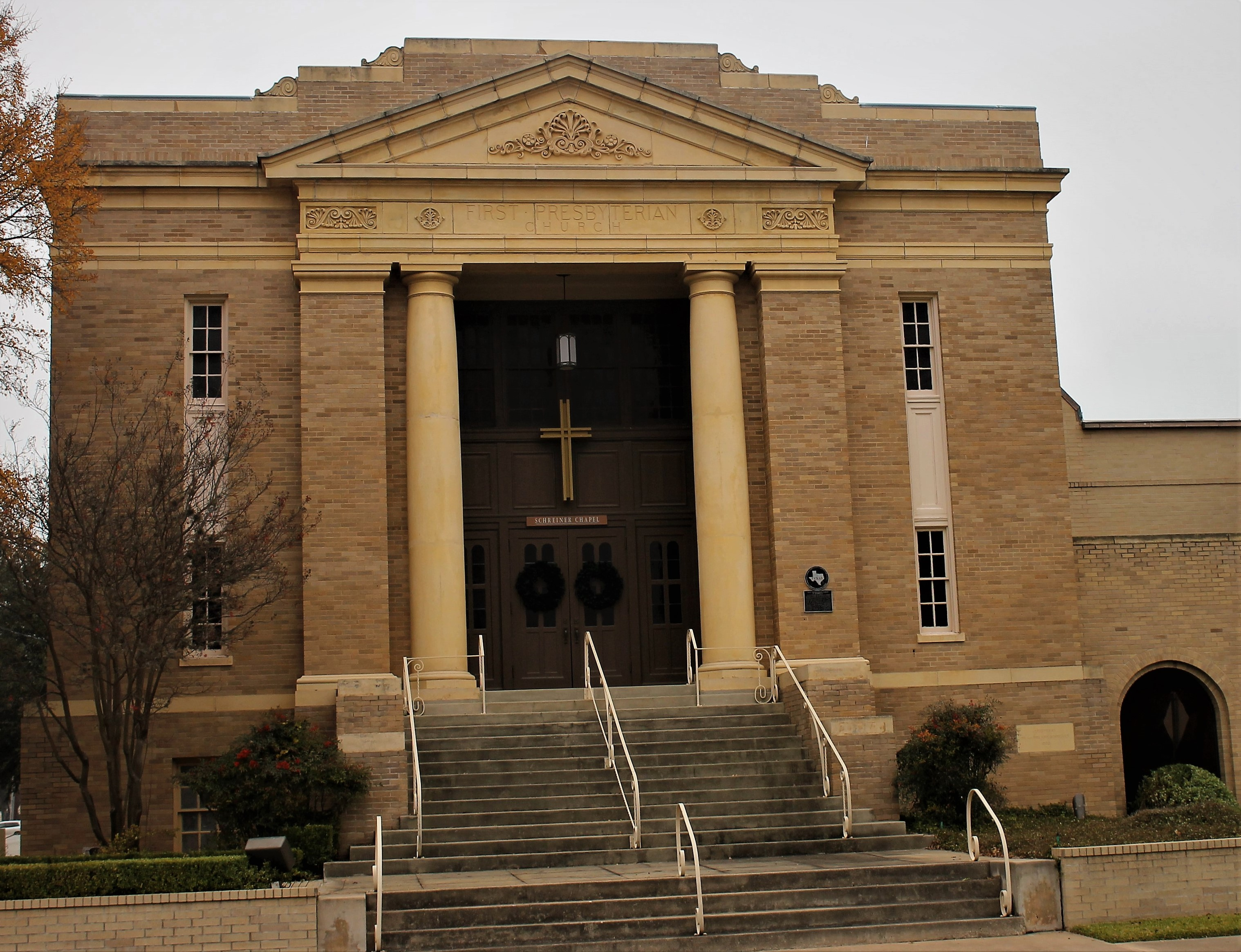
First Presbyterian Church at 800 Jefferson St. in Kerrville

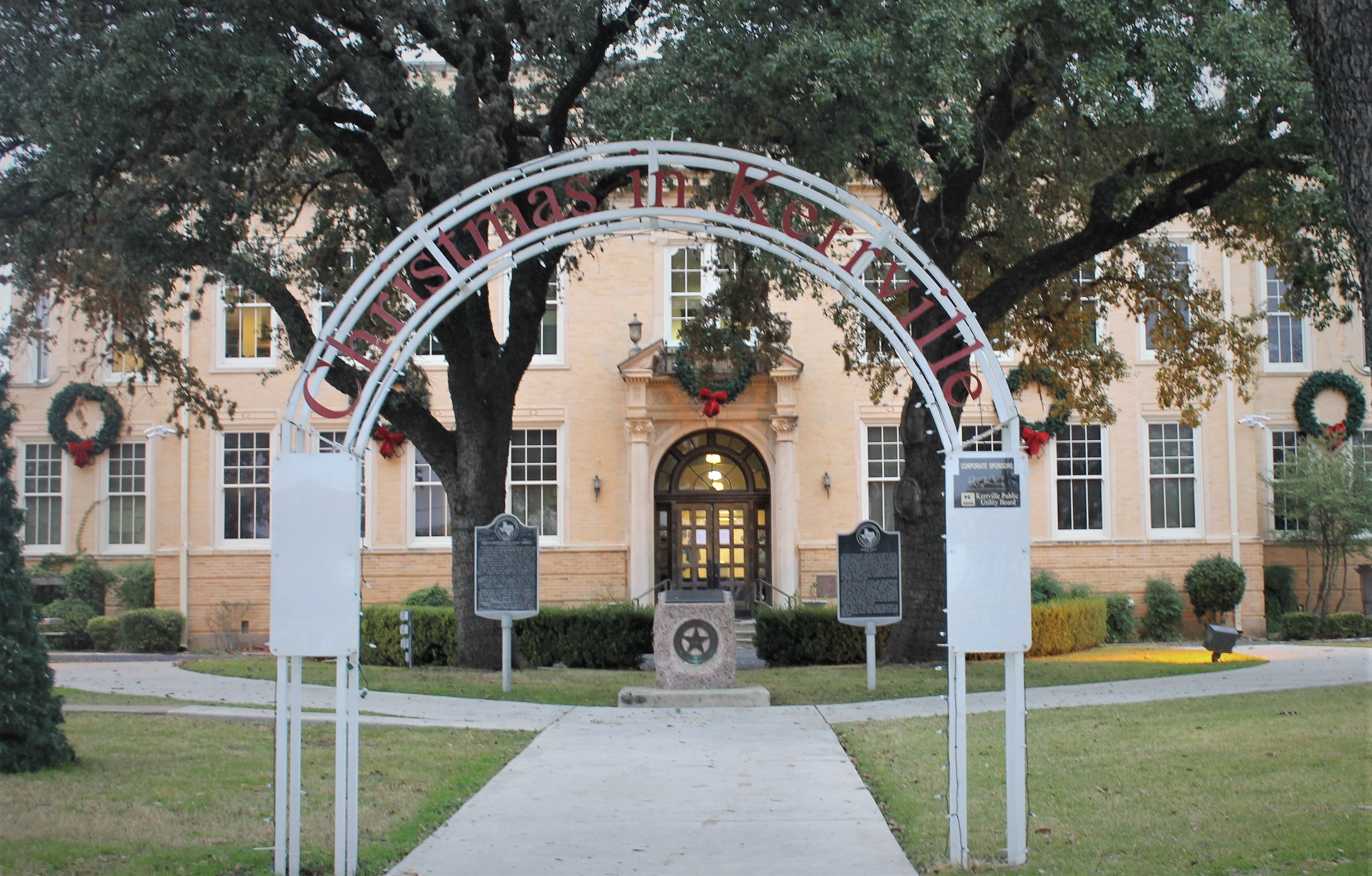
Christmas in downtown Kerrville (2016)

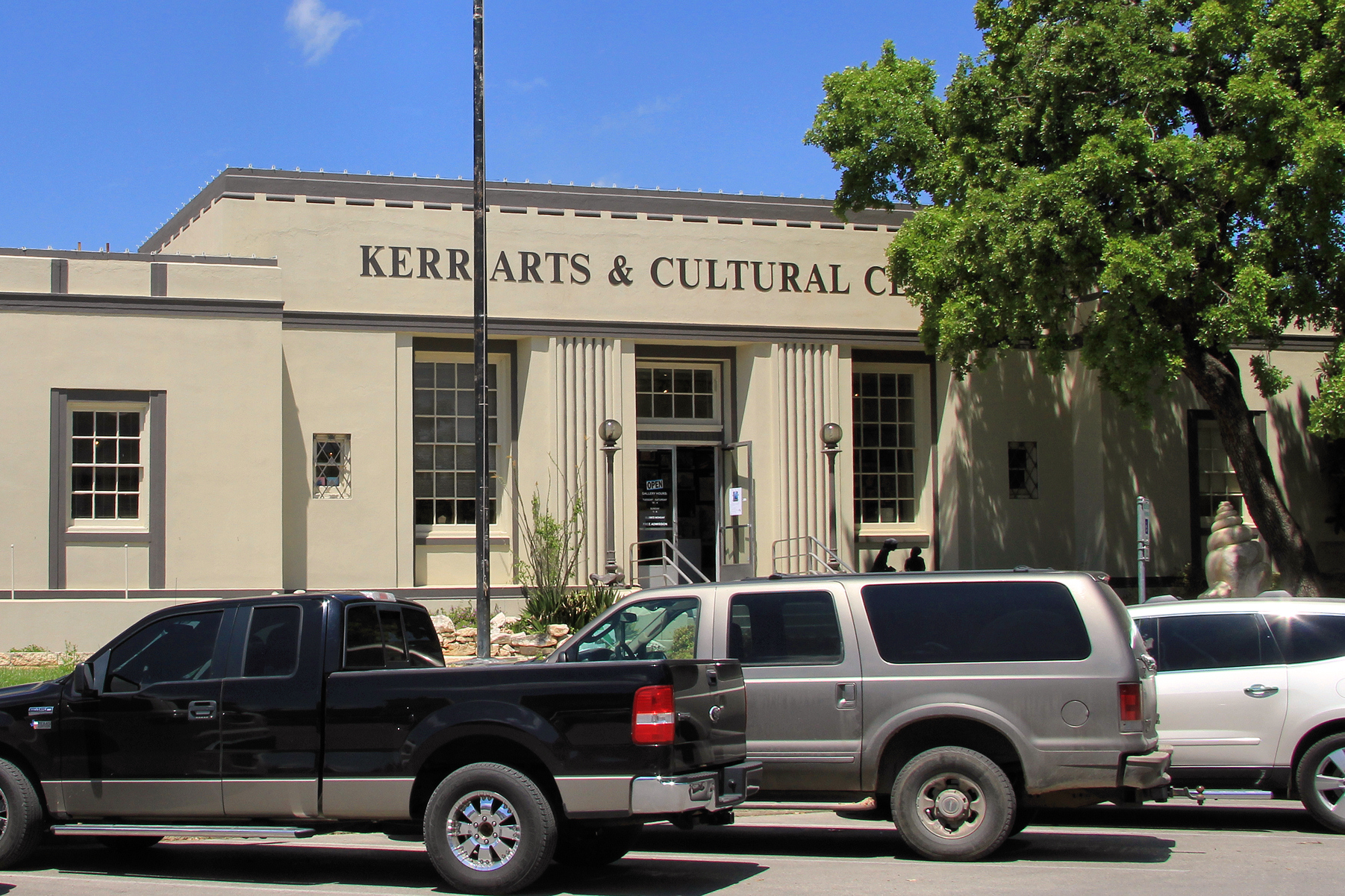
Kerr Arts and Cultural Center in Kerrville

== Twin towns – sister cities ==
- Delicias, Chihuahua, Mexico

== See also ==
- July 2025 Central Texas floods
