= DeWitt Colony =

Early Texas colony founded by Greene DeWitt

The DeWitt Colony (c. 1820s through the 1840s) was a settlement in Mexico (now Texas) founded by Green DeWitt. From lands belonging to that colony, the present Texas counties of DeWitt, Guadalupe and Lavaca were created. The hub of the colony was primarily located, however, in what is now Gonzales County. The first battle of the Texas Revolution occurred in the DeWitt Colony.

== Background ==
In 1821 the Mexican War of Independence severed the control that Spain had exercised on its North American territories, and the new country of Mexico was formed from much of the lands that had comprised New Spain, including Spanish Texas. Because it was sparsely populated, Texas was combined with Coahuila to create a new state, Coahuila y Tejas.

The new Mexican government was bankrupt and had little money to devote to the military. Settlers were empowered to create their own militias to help control hostile Indian tribes. Mexican Texas faced raids from both the Apache and Comanche tribes, and with little military support, the few settlers in the region needed help. In the hopes that an influx of settlers could control the Indian raids, the government liberalized its immigration policies for the region, and settlers from the United States were permitted in the colonies for the first time.

The 1824 General Colonization Law enabled all heads of household who were citizens of or immigrants to Mexico to be eligible to claim land. The law did not differentiate among races or social stature, and people who had been granted occupancy rights would be able to claim the land patent for the dwellings. Immigrants were required to be Roman Catholic and foreigners were expected to learn Spanish. Settlers were supposed to own property or have a craft or useful profession, and all people wishing to live in Texas were expected to report to the nearest Mexican authority for permission to settle.

Approval for settlement contracts for Texas was the responsibility of the state government in Saltillo. They were soon besieged by foreign speculators wanting to bring colonists into the state. Coahuila y Tejas implemented the federal law in 1825. At this time, about 3500 people lived in Texas, mostly congregated at San Antonio and La Bahia. Under the new law, people who did not already possess property in Texas could claim one square league (4438 acres) of irrigable land, with an additional league available to those who owned cattle. Soldiers were given the first choice of land, followed by citizens and immigrants. Empresarios and individuals with large families were exempt from the limit. Those who had owned land under Spanish control were allowed to retain their property as long as they had not fought on the side of the Spanish during the Mexican War of Independence. Immigrants were subject to the same policies as Mexican citizens, and Indians who migrated to Texas after Mexican independence and were not native to the area would be treated as immigrants. Stephen F. Austin quickly became the first empresario to successfully establish a colony in Texas.

== Establishment ==
In 1822, Dewitt petitioned the Mexican government for permission to settle colonists in Texas but was denied. After gaining the support of Stephen F. Austin, an influential Texas empresario, Dewitt's second petition, in 1825, was granted. He was given permission to settle 400 respectable, industrious, Catholic families in an area bounded by the Guadalupe River, San Marcos River, and Lavaca River. This colony was southwest of Austin's. Dewitt hired James Kerr as his surveyor.

In the summer of 1825, Kerr, along with Deaf Smith, Brazil Durbin, Geron Hinds, John Wightman, James Musick, and a Mr. Strickland, searched for a suitable location for the colony. Kerr chose to place the capital, called Gonzales after Rafael Gonzales, provisional governor of Coahuila y Tejas, at the confluence of the San Marcos and Guadalupe Rivers. The original location was 1 mile (1.6 km) east of the present city of Gonzales. To create the new town, several cabins were erected. Settlers began arriving in the summer of 1825.

"On a little creek, called ever since Kerr's Creek, about two and a half miles east of the junction of the rivers, they erected cabins, August 1825. A few weeks later the first family, that of Francis Berry, joined them."
-- p. 102, "De Witt's Colony," Ethel Zivley Rather Also see History of Texas, Vol. 1, John Henry Brown, p. 124

In July 1826 Gonzales was raided by Indians who were looking for horses. One colonist, John Wightman, was killed in the raid. Most of the settlers fled temporarily to Austin's colony. Although the colonization laws specified that settlements should not be established within 10 leagues of the coast, DeWitt gained permission from the Bexar authorities to establish a temporary settlement, which they called Old Station, on Matagorda Bay near the mouth of the Lavaca River. The settlement would be allowed until enough colonists had arrived to be able to see to their own safety in Gonzales. In July 1826 Francis Berry and his family became the first family to reside in the Dewitt Colony. By October 1826, 40 people lived in Old Station, including Dewitt and his family. DeWitt recruited most of the settlers from Missouri. He obtained a four-year contract with a schooner called Dispatch, captained by William Jarvis Russell, and with this he made his way down the Mississippi River to New Orleans, Louisiana.

== Neighbor relations ==
Because the Mexican government had made an error and included another colony in the contract grant, DeWitt had numerous disputes with Martín De León, who had founded a colony near present-day Victoria. In late 1826, DeWitt was arrested, on the authorization of the Mexican government, due to Martín De León claiming tobacco being shipped into the colony was contraband. As a result of the arrest, however, Mexican authorities ordered that Old Station be abandoned, and Gonzales was reestablished. By December, 1827, DeWitt had completed the construction of a fort in the previous location of Gonzales. The construction had been hampered by numerous Comanche raids, but after its completion, all settlers relocated to that location.

In 1827, DeWitt joined Austin and De Leon in signing a peace treaty with the Karankawa so that their colonies would be safe from raids. DeWitt also negotiated a peace treaty with the Tonkawa, but were unable to reach terms with the Comanche. As Comanche raids took a toll on the settlement, the political chief in Bexar sent the settlers of Gonzales a small cannon that they could use for their protection.

== Growth ==
By 1828 the colony consisted of 11 families and 27 single men. Most were primarily from the southern states of Arkansas, Mississippi, Alabama, Tennessee, and Louisiana, with some coming from as far north as New York. By 1829 the colony had experienced a boom, expanding to 30 families and 34 single men. By 1830, the colony had 56 families, and 65 single men.

In 1830 Mexican authorities passed a law prohibiting further immigration to Texas from the United States. Austin was able to secure a waiver for DeWitt's colony, but the measure made it difficult for him to recruit families. When his contract expired on April 15, 1831, he had settled a total of 166 families. Because he was unable to meet the terms of the contract, any unassigned lands in his colony reverted to the Mexican government, and DeWitt was unable to get a further contract.

== Legacy ==
The lands that comprised DeWitt Colony have been partitioned into several Texas counties. These include DeWitt, Guadalupe, Lavaca, and Gonzales.
