= Greystone Preparatory School =

The Greystone Preparatory School is an educational institute situated on the campus of University of the Ozarks in Clarksville, Arkansas, United States. It aims to prepare candidates to attend one of the five U.S Federal Service Academies: United States Air Force Academy, United States Naval Academy, United States Military Academy, United States Merchant Marine Academy, and United States Coast Guard Academy.
