= Museum of Western Art (Kerrville, Texas) =

- Location within Texas Museum of Western Art (the United States)
- Established: 1983
- Location: 1550 Bandera Highway; Kerrville, Texas
- Coordinates: 30.0244°N 99.1371°W
- Type: Art museum
- Website: museumofwesternart.com

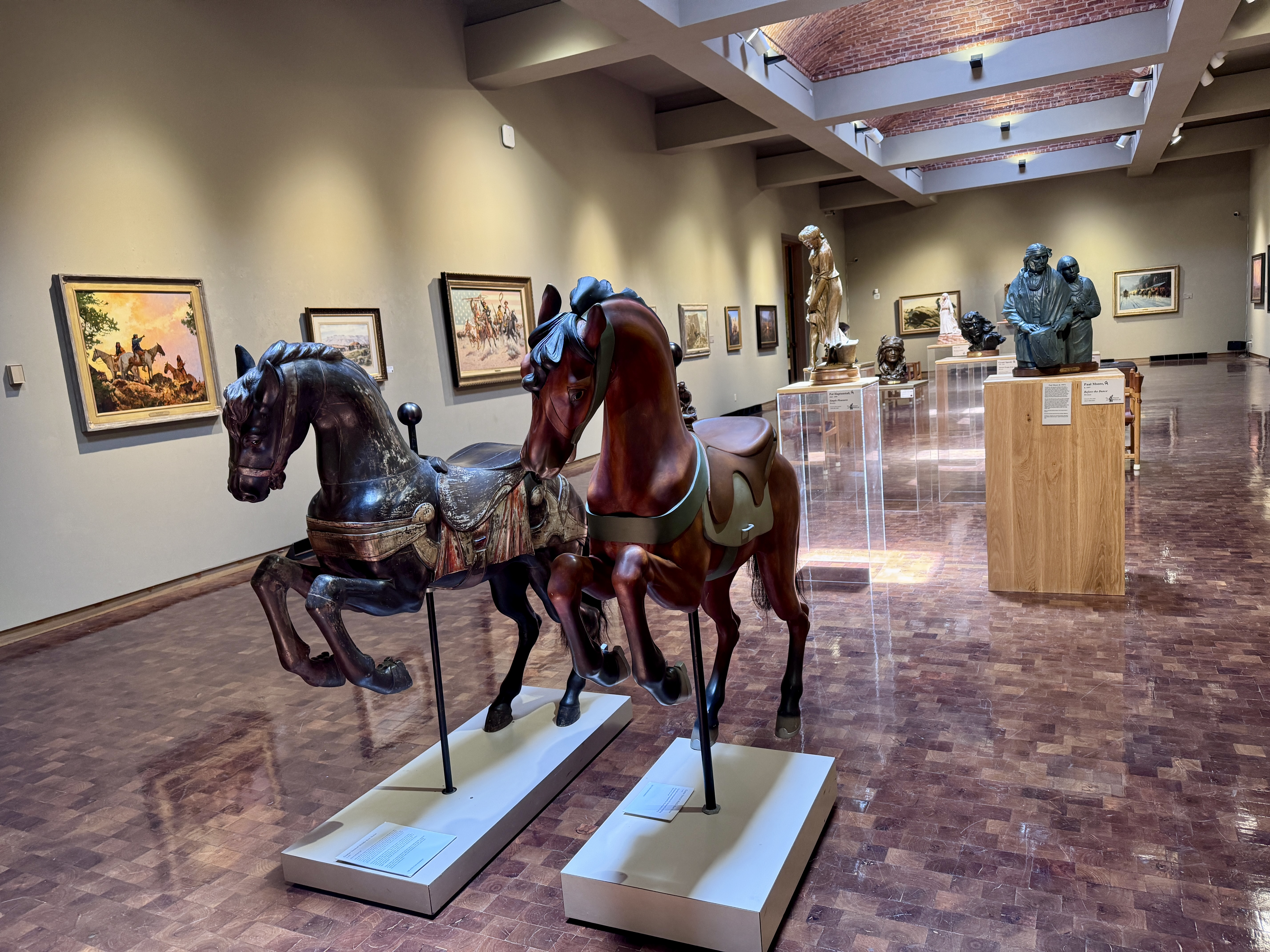

The Museum of Western Art in Kerrville, Texas, is an art museum dedicated to the paintings and sculptures of contemporary artists of the American West who follow in the tradition of Frederic Remington and Charles M. Russell. In addition to the rotating collection, the museum also has an extensive western research library and Journey West children's gallery. The museum uses the motto "Where the Legend Lives".

== History ==
The museum opened on April 23, 1983 as the Cowboy Artists of America Museum, intended to serve as the headquarters of the Cowboy Artists of America. The building was designed by the late O'Neil Ford, a pioneer in the Southwestern style of architecture. In 2004, the Masel S. Quinn Pavilion of the Western Art Academy was completed for use in ongoing education programs.

A subsequent dispute led to the dissolution of formal ties between the museum and the association, and the museum changed its name to the National Center for American Western Art and then to The Museum of Western Art in 2003.

== Highlights ==
The museum's exterior features a hacienda-type exterior designed by Texas architect O'Neill Ford and manicured grounds graced by larger-than-lifesize western sculptures. The 14,000 square foot of interior space houses an impressive permanent collection of paintings and sculptures, all done by past and present western artists. Handcrafted boveda ceilings, end-cut mesquite and Saltillo tile flooring combine with a multitude of western artifacts and art. In addition to three indoor galleries, a western research library, the Journey West Children's gallery and a museum store. An outdoor pavilion is used frequently for special events, wedding receptions, corporate gatherings, reunions and educational classes.

An Honest Day's Work by Fred Fellows at the Museum of Western Art

== Permanent Collection ==
The Museum of Western Art's permanent collection contains paintings and sculptures from some of the leading artists in America in the last two centuries. Some recognizable names include Robert Pummill, Frank McCarthy, Oscar Beninghaus, Fred Fellows, Bill Nebeker, Grant Speed, George Phippen, and Orland Joe. These works are rotated throughout the year to give returning visitors always something new to view.

== Journey West Children's Gallery ==
This interactive gallery opened in 2005, focused on creating a learning experience for youngsters to learn how life was on the wagon trail. Featured fun include a chuckwagon to climb into, tipi to crawl into, campfire setting, western artifacts and chronological calendar entries, plus dress-up clothes.

== Special Exhibitions ==
Throughout the year, juried exhibits from leading U.S. western artists are on display giving museum-goers opportunity to purchase art. Among the top artists in recent years have been Quang Ho, Scott Christiansen, Kevin McPherson, Walt Gonske and western photographer Rachel Spencer. Scheduled during 2026 include Adrienne Stein and in American Women Artist of America. Each year in April, the annual Western Roundup Exhibition & Sale is held that attracts over 40 of the top artists in the Western art genre.

== Western Artifacts ==
The Museum also has on view one of the largest collections of barbed wire in the country, a collection of authentic cap guns from the old Wild West shows, a display of ladies antique pistols, and the actual headdress worn by the Quanah Parker, the last principal chief of the Comanche Ntion.

Awards and Recognitions

The museum has received recognition as one of the top western art museums in the U.S. by True West Magazine from 2021 - 2026. In 2025 it was rated the Top Western Art Museum in the U.S. It has also been rated by a reader poll of The Kerrville Daily Times as the Top Attraction in Kerrville for 2021 and 2024. For its numerous podcasts with notable artists, the museum won the 2024 Academy of Interactive & Visutal Arts 'Award of Distinction" award.

Museum of Western Art
Established	1983
Location	1550 Bandera Highway Kerrville, Texas
Coordinates	30.0244°N 99.1371°WCoordinates: 30.0244°N 99.1371°W
Type	Art museum
Website	museumofwesternart.com

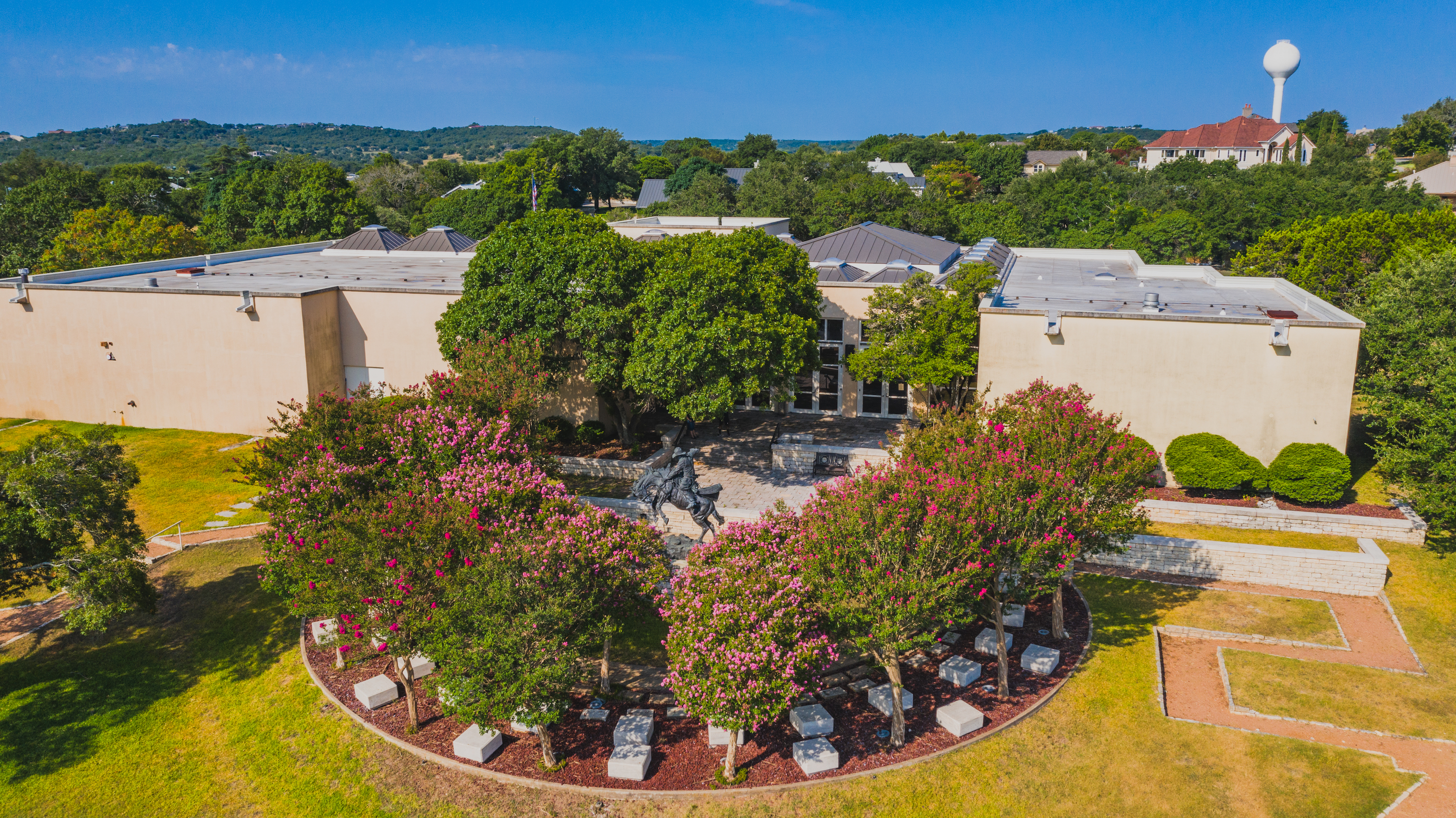
The grounds of The Museum of Western Art in Kerrville Texas.

Location

Located five miles off I-10, exit 508, the museum is an hour's drive northwest of San Antonio. Regular hours are Tuesday - Saturday, 10 a.m. to 4 p.m. Admission rates listed on website, www.museumofwesternart.com. Current and retired military always complimentary when military i.d. is presented.

== See also ==
- Museums in Texas
- Museums in Central Texas
