= Floods in the United States (1900–1999) =

List of events with significant impact

Floods in the United States are generally caused by excessive rainfall, excessive snowmelt, and dam failure. Below is a list of flood events that were of significant impact to the country during the 20th century, from 1900 through 1999, inclusive.

== Decade of the 1900s ==
=== Kansas River – May 1903 ===
The greatest flood of the Kansas River on record of in the memory of the oldest inhabitants living along the stream occurred May 23 to June 13, 1903.

=== Pacolet River (South Carolina) – June 1903 ===
On June 6, 1903, after heavy rain, the Pacolet River destroyed or heavily damaged six large cotton mills, their associated dams, and 70 houses in the mill villages of Converse, Clifton, and Pacolet, South Carolina. Approximately 100 people were killed.

=== Heppner flood – June 1903 ===
The third deadliest flash flood in US history, the normally placid Willow Creek burst its banks during an intense rain and hail storm. The city of Heppner, at the foothills of the Blue Mountains in eastern Oregon, was almost completely destroyed. 247 of Heppner's 1,400 residents died in the flood.

Flooding in Battle Creek in 1904

=== Sacramento River Flood – February 1904 ===
From February 15 to the end of March 1904 occurred the most destructive flood as far as property was concerned in the recorded history of Sacramento. The greatest known flood occurred forty-odd years before, In January, 1862 and was due to rainfall, the precipitation in December, 1861 and January, 1862 just prior to it having been 23.62 inches (600 mm). This flood filled the entire flood plain, and was not limited, as was the later one, by the reclamation of large tracts of bottom land, nor was the channel below the mouth of the Feather River then filled with mining debris as it is now.

=== Susquehanna River – March 1904 ===
Due mainly to ice gorges.

=== Mohawk River – March 1904 ===
From March 25 to 31, 1904, there occurred a flood on Mohawk River, in New York State, which, while not the largest and most destructive in the recorded history of this stream, attained a maximum discharge on March 26 of 20.84 cubic feet per second per square mile.

=== Grand River – March 1904 ===
Due mainly to the rapid melting of snow, flooding was more significant along the Grand, Saginaw, Kalamazoo, and River Raisin river basins than the St. Joseph and Huron River basins. In Lansing, it was the worst flood in the previous 135 years of its history. Many dams were either undermined or swept away. Kalamazoo saw two square miles of flooding during this event.

It was also considered the most destructive flood in Grand Rapids history. The Grand River went above bankfull on the night of March 24, rising slowly for the next four days. It broke the previous high-water mark by over 60 cm (2.0 ft), and was considered a once in 100 year flood. Over one-half of the population on the west side of the river was inundated. On the east bank of the river, numerous factories went underwater. There was one casualty. Damages totaled US$1.8 million (1904 dollars). To the left is an image showing the flooding in Battle Creek.

=== Wabash River – March 1904 ===
Due mainly to rainfall.

=== Cache la Poudre River and Crow Creek – May 1904 ===
In May, very heavy rains in northern Colorado and southern Wyoming caused a flood on the Cache la Poudre and Crow Creek which resulted in the loss of considerable property along them.

=== Belle Fourche and Red Rivers, Spearfish and Whitewood Creeks – June 1904 ===
In the early part of June the Belle Fourche and other streams on the northern slope of the Black Hills were in destructive flood attaining on June 6 a gauge height of about 10.9 feet and a corresponding discharge of 5,931 second-feet. The absolute maximum gauge height during this flood was 11.25 feet and the corresponding discharge was 6,270 second-feet.

=== Arkansas, Kansas, Neosho, Verdigris and Osage Rivers in Southeastern Kansas – June and July 1904 ===
In the latter part of June and the early part of July continued heavy rain caused the rivers in southeastern Kansas to be higher than ever known before and to cause much damage.

=== Scottdale Valley Flood – July 7, 1904 ===
Dam Failure.

=== Johnstown Pennsylvania – July 8 and 9, 1904 ===
Cloudburst

=== Troxton Canyon Arizona – July 30, 1904 ===
Flash flood from Cloudburst, 30 feet high in canyon for 30 minutes.

=== Canadian, Cimarron and Mora River Flood – October 1904 ===
From September 26 to 30 the precipitation over the greater portion of the drainage basin of the Canadian in New Mexico varied from 5 to 7 inches. This excess of monthly rainfall varied from 2.75 to about 6.5 inches in depth. The greatest precipitation in 24 consecutive hours was about 4 inches. Such a downpour of rain on a basin of steep nonabsorbent surface with little or no storage resulted in a sudden and very large, though local, flood.

The gauge at the gauging station at Logan was destroyed on October 2, 1904. Mr. W. G. Russell measured the cross section and slop of bed of the Canadian as short distance below the railway bridge at Logan on October 27, 1904, and found the cross section area to be about 13,500 square feet, the mean velocity 11.05 feet, the maximum discharge 149,396 cubic feet per second and the maximum stage above low water 31.3 feet.

=== La Plata River Flood – October 6, 1904 ===
A storm caused the greatest flood along the middle and lower part of the La Plata velley since 1882. It reached its maximum stage at 4pm at Pendleton, passing over the floor of the highway bridge at a depth of 2 feet.

=== Sacramento Valley Flood – 1906 ===
A tropical storm in late 1906 reported highest ever rainfalls in a southeast to northwest direction from Monterey to Ione in the Sierra Nevada foothills. An area of 300,000 acres (1,200 km^{2}) was flooded in the Sacramento Valley.

Image from 1907 flood in downtown Pittsburgh, Pennsylvania

=== Pittsburgh, Pennsylvania flood – March 1907 ===
Snowmelt combined with heavy rains by March 16 allowed the Allegheny, Monongahela, and Ohio rivers to swell out of their banks, leading to a flood of record in Pittsburgh. Damage to the city was estimated at US$5 million (1907 dollars). The death toll was low, with 6–12 perishing during the inundation.

flooding in Battle Creek – 1908

=== Michigan flood – March 1908 ===
In February, snowstorms had deposited a significant snowpack across the region. Then, in early March, heavy rains and warmer conditions set in, setting the stage for a flood. After the Homer Dam broke around 3 p.m. on March 7, the Kalamazoo River flooded Albion. By midnight, the bridges surrounding town were underwater. Six buildings in downtown Albion collapsed, which caused over US$125,000 in damage (1908 dollars).

=== California flood – 1909 ===
The storm extended from Fort Ross on the coast to the Feather River basin. LaPorte, in the Feather River basin, had 1,458 mm (57.4 in) of rain in 20 days, an event with a return period of 12,000 years. The flood episodes of 1907 and 1909 in California resulted in an overhaul of planned statewide flood control designs.

Damage from 1911 flood in Austin, Pennsylvania

== Decade of the 1910s ==
=== Austin, Pennsylvania, dam failure – September 30, 1911 ===
Heavy rains filling the Bayless reservoir cracked the concrete dam, sending an estimated 450,000,000 gallons downstream, and destroying most of the boroughs of Austin and Costello. A total of 78 people from Austin and 2 from Costello died during the inundation.

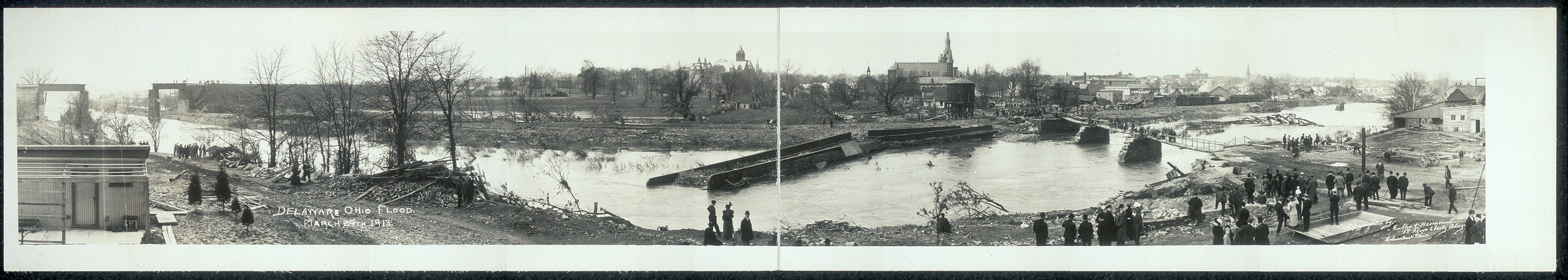
flood image from 1913 flood at Delaware, Ohio

=== Great Flood – March 1913 ===
Significant flooding occurred between March 23 and 26 after major rivers in the central and eastern United States flooded from runoff and several days of record-breaking rain. In Ohio nearly 10 in (250 mm) of rain during a series of three winter storms led to this flood event, which affected southwest, central, and eastern Ohio, especially cities and towns along the Great Miami River and Olentangy River valleys. It remains Ohio's "largest weather disaster" and Indiana's worst flood on record. Fires and tornadoes also wrought destruction. Storm-related flooding affected more than a dozen states: Alabama, Arkansas, Connecticut, Illinois, Indiana, Kentucky, Louisiana, Maryland, Massachusetts, Mississippi, Missouri, New Hampshire, New Jersey, New York, North Carolina, Ohio, Pennsylvania, Tennessee, Vermont, and Virginia.

==== Dayton area ====
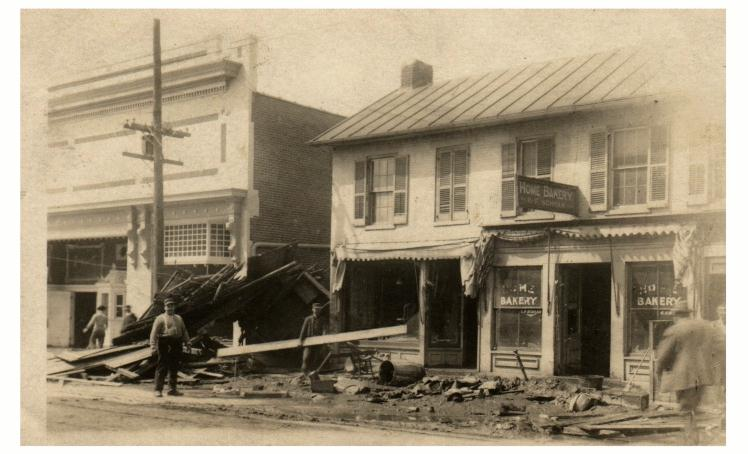
Aftermath of the 1913 flood in Miamisburg, Ohio.

Dayton was totally devastated, being inundated for three days in late March 1913. The floods ended operations on the Ohio and Erie Canal, as they destroyed most of the locks and many miles of embankments. The death toll from this flood was 361, with total damages of US$100 million.

==== Columbus area ====
On the Olentangy River, this flood broke the previous record for river stage by over 14.5 ft (4.4 m). In the city of Delaware, 50–75 persons died after a break in the levee allowed a 7-foot-tall (2.1 m) wall of water to sweep through downtown. Five of the city's bridges washed away.

The state capital, Columbus, suffered its worst ever flooding from the Olentangy and Scioto rivers. The Franklinton area on the west side was inundated after a levee broke on March 25. Four thousand houses were damaged or destroyed, between 90 and 100 lives were lost, and three of four Scioto River bridges downtown were destroyed (only the Rich Street bridge survived – Town, State and Broad street bridges were destroyed). The owner of The Columbus Dispatch, Robert F. Wolfe, chartered interurban trains to Buckeye Lake some 30 mi (48 km) east of Columbus to retrieve boats to rescue survivors. Flooding also occurred along Alum Creek on the city's east side.

==== Southern Ohio ====
In Chillicothe, Scioto River flooding carved out a 6–12 ft (1.8–3.7 m) deep channel on Hickory Street. 18 lost their lives in the city.

The Ohio River reached a level of 69 ft (21 m) near Higginsport.

=== Texas flood – 1913 ===
The Guadalupe and Trinity Rivers left their banks, and the Brazos River and the Colorado River joined to flood more than 3,000 square miles of land and cause the deaths of at least 177 people and massive property damage ($3,436,144 in the Brazos Valley alone). The flood caused the Brazos river to change course. It now entered the Gulf of Mexico at Freeport, Texas. Major flooding brought death and destruction of greater magnitude than previously experienced. The floods of 1913 and again in 1921 were the catalyst that would cause the state of Texas to attempt to tame the Brazos River.

=== Southern California floods - January 1916 ===
During early 1916, heavy rains caused floods throughout Southern California, virtually cutting off San Diego County from the rest of the state for the greater part of a month. Due to the floods 28 people died and about ten million dollars in damages were caused, with the greatest losses occurring in San Diego County, where twenty-two people died mostly in Otay River valley when the Lower Otay Dam failed, releasing the contents of the Lower Otay Reservoir. Another estimate was that fifty lives were lost in San Diego County. Among the dead was an early Japanese American colony. San Diego residents blamed the floods on Charles Hatfield who was hired by the city of San Diego to create rain.

=== Southeast floods – July 1916 ===
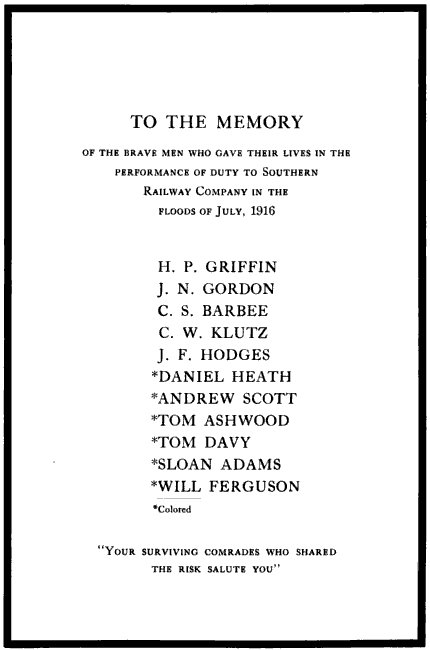
List of employees of the Southern Railway Company who were killed working during the 1916 flood in the Carolinas

On July 5–6, 1916, a tropical cyclone swept across the Mississippi coast, which caused torrential rains across it and adjacent states; rains from this storm affected Southern states as far north as North Carolina and Tennessee.

Another tropical storm passed over Charleston, South Carolina, during the morning of July 14, 1916, and passed to the northwest. It hit the Carolinas hard, especially western North Carolina (July 15) and northwestern South Carolina.

All previous records for 24-hour rainfalls were exceeded, and rivers and streams throughout the area rose past all previously recorded levels. The resulting flooding was disastrous, and approximately 80 people were killed and property damage was estimated at 25 million dollars.

=== Ohio River flood – February 1918 ===
Ice jams due to a quick thaw led to this flood. The river stage at Cincinnati climbed to near 19 m (62 ft) during the event. Ice blocks in the river destroyed steamboats on the river, ending the era of steamboat commerce on the Ohio River.

== Decade of the 1920s ==
=== Thrall flood – September 1921 ===
This storm caused the most deadly floods in Texas, with a total of 215 fatalities. On September 9 and 10, 1921, the remnants of a hurricane moved over Williamson County. The center of the storm became stationary over Thrall, dropping a storm total of 39.7 inches (1,010 mm) of rain in 36 hours.

The 24-hour rainfall total ending 7 AM on September 10, 1921 (38.2 inches) at a U.S. Weather Bureau station in Thrall remains the national official 24-hour rainfall record.

Eighty-seven people drowned in and near Taylor, and 93 in Williamson County. Thrall rainfall was 23.4 inches (590 mm) during 6 hours, 31.8 inches (810 mm) during 12 hours, and 36.4 inches (920 mm) during 18 hours.

=== Great Mississippi Flood of 1927 ===
From the summer of 1926 into the spring of 1927, heavy rains much greater than normal saturated the ground throughout eastern Kansas, Oklahoma, and the Ohio Valley. The White and Little Red rivers broke through the levees in Arkansas in February, flooding over 400 km^{2} (99,000 acres) with 3 to 5 m (9.8 to 16.4 ft) of water. The first levee break along the Mississippi River occurred a few miles south of Elaine, Arkansas on March 29.

Over the next six weeks, numerous levees broke along the Mississippi River from Illinois to Louisiana, which inundated numerous towns in the Mississippi Valley. The break at Mounds Landing near Greenville, Mississippi, was the single greatest crevasse to ever occur along the Mississippi River. It single-handedly flooded an area 80 km (50 mi) wide and 160 km (99 mi) long with up to 6 metres (20 ft) of water. Heavy spring rains caused a second major flood in the same region that June. In all, 73,500 km^{2} (28,400 sq mi) which were home to more than 931,000 people were inundated. The flood finally subsided in August. The massive Red Cross relief effort was directed by then Secretary of Commerce Herbert Hoover, which later catapulted him into the presidency and made the New Deal a reality within the next decade.

In order to avoid flooding the city of New Orleans, the governor of Louisiana allowed engineers to create the Poydras cut, which saved the city but led to the flooding of St. Bernard and Plaquemines parishes instead. Millions of acres across seven states were flooded. Evacuees totaled 500,000. Economic losses were estimated at US$1 billion (1927 dollars), which was equivalent to almost one-third of the federal budget at that time.

=== New England flood – November 1927 ===
A late-season tropical cyclone moved through the region on November 3–4, dropping substantial rains across central New England. Vermont was where most of the death and damage was seen during this flood; local rainfall totals reached upwards of near 375 mm (14.8 in). In New Hampshire, the Pemigewasset, Baker, Ammonoosuc, Merrimack and Connecticut rivers went into flood. Along the Androscoggin River in Maine, floods destroyed the covered bridge in Bethel, and a steel bridge replaced the old bridge to accommodate truck traffic across the river. Life was also disrupted in Rumford from this flood. Damages from the flood totaled US$40 million (in 1927 dollars). Eighty-five people lost their lives in the flood, including Vermont's Lt. Gov. Hollister Jackson.

=== St. Francis Dam failure - March 1928 ===
Shortly before midnight on March 12, 1928, the 195-foot St. Francis Dam in the San Francisquito Canyon above what is now the city of Santa Clarita in California failed catastrophically due to a pre-existing geologic fault in its east abutment. At least 431 people were killed as the 47,000,000 m^{3} full-capacity reservoir collapse caused a flood wave 140 feet high, which emptied into the Pacific Ocean six hours later near Montalvo, California, nearly 50 miles away. The dam and reservoir were designed by William Mulholland as additions to the first Los Angeles Aqueduct system that conveyed water from the Owens to the city of Los Angeles. The dam's failure was attributed to design errors that did not take into account the poor foundation rock in the canyon and the resulting hydraulic uplift due to overfilling the reservoir.

== Decade of the 1930s ==
=== Northeast flood – spring 1936 ===
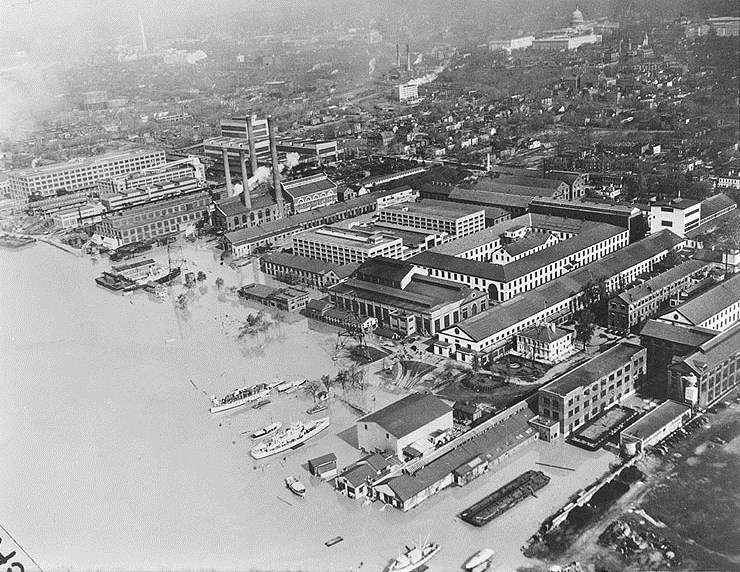
Anacostia River, during the 1936 Potomac River flood.

Rain concurrent with snowmelt set the stage for this flood. It affected the entire state of New Hampshire. In Maine, a major flood washed out railroad tracks along the Androscoggin River east of Bethel and the industrial section of Rumford. Jay saw its mills and factories along the river damaged. The East Turner bridge was again destroyed. The iron bridge between Lisbon Falls and Durham washed away. Along the Kennebec River, the Ticonic bridge was washed downstream at Waterville, Maine. In all, damage totaled US$113 million (1936 dollars), and 24 people were killed. Damage was significant along the C&O Canal during the greatest of all Potomac River floods. The flood carried off many of the bridges along the Potomac from Harpers Ferry, West Virginia to Hancock, Maryland. Pittsburgh suffered the worst floods in its history.

==== Lowell, Massachusetts ====
In Lowell, Massachusetts, during the 1936 spring floods, the Merrimack River exceeded its banks, causing havoc in most of the city's northern banks. The Francis Gate saved the downtown area, but other sections of the city were not so lucky.

Lowell had a second, lesser flood in 1938. This flood prompted the federal government to assume responsibility for flood control throughout the country.

==== Great Plains ====
1935 Republican River flood. Heavy rains on the parched lands of the Great Plains came on Memorial Day week-end, causing flooding on the Republican River and other rivers. It has been called "Nebraska's deadliest flood".

=== Ohio River flood of 1937 – January 1937 ===
A significant flood struck the region. At Cincinnati, the flood peaked twice within three months, first on January 14. The river stage nearly reached 21 m (69 ft). Cincinnati experienced a double disaster as 10 or more gas tanks exploded on "Black Sunday", January 24, which led to oil fires on the Ohio and in Mill Creek Valley. Two days later, the Ohio River crested in Cincinnati at a record 24.381 m (79.99 ft). flooding in the city lasted 19 days. In Kentucky, one-third of Kenton and Campbell counties were submerged. The cities of Louisville, Owensboro, Paducah, and others were disastrously inundated. In Indiana, Aurora was inundated. In Ohio, Higginsport was almost completely submerged during the flood, along with Columbus, Dayton, Hamilton, and Middletown. Damages totaled US$20 million (1937 dollars).

=== Santa Ana, California, flood – February 1937 ===
The storm of February 4–7, 1937, resulted in the highest four-day rainfall totals at several stations in the Santa Ana River basin. The Riverside north station had over 200 mm (7.9 in) of rain in that four days, which equaled a 450-year event.

=== Northeast California flood – December 1937 ===
The storm of December 1937 was a high elevation event in the northeast corner of the state.

=== Los Angeles flood of 1938 ===
Two significant cyclones moved through the region; one between February 27 and March 1 and the second between March 1 and 3. Over 254 mm (10.0 in) of rain had fallen during the five-day period. Massive debris flows moved out from the San Gabriel Mountains into the Los Angeles Basin. Although Los Angeles County experienced damage, Riverside and Orange counties bore the brunt of the flooding. A total of 5601 homes were destroyed, and an additional 1500 homes were left uninhabitable. The three transcontinental railroads connecting Los Angeles to the outside world experienced washed out bridges and flooded lines, isolating the city. Mail service after the flood was conducted by the U.S. Coast Guard. The death toll was 115. It was the region's worst flood since New Year's Day of 1934. The result of this flood was the flood Control Act of 1936, which authorized the U.S. Army Corps of Engineers to build a series of concrete sewers.

=== Battle Creek, Michigan, flood – June 1938 ===
Battle Creek, Michigan flood

== Decade of the 1940s ==
=== Oklahoma/Arkansas flood – 1945 ===
Floods of record occurred on the Sulphur, Sabine, Red, Ouachita, and Little rivers during this event. It helped spur reservoir construction on these rivers in the 1950s and 1960s.

=== Ohio River flood of 1945 ===
The 1945 flood of the Ohio River was the second-worst in Louisville, Kentucky, history after the one in 1937 and caused the razing of the entire waterfront district of the neighborhood of Portland. Afterwards, flood walls were erected around the city to 3 feet (0.91 m) above the highest level of the '37 flood.

=== Michigan flood of April 1947 ===
Snow fell the previous month across Michigan. A pair of frontal zones brought heavy rains to the lower peninsula of Michigan during the first several days of the month. Rainfall amounts of 126 mm (5.0 in) were measured at Jackson with a larger area of 75 mm (3.0 in) falling between Benton Harbor and Detroit. The heavy rain melting the existent snowpack increased runoff, and frozen ground across the region did not help matters. flooding was witnessed from April 4 to 11 and it was considered the worst flood since 1904 for the region. The Kalamazoo, Grand, Saginaw, St. Clair, Clinton, and River Rouge river basins were impacted by this inundation, which was generally considered a once in 50 year event. Damage totaled US$4 million (1947 dollars).

== Decade of the 1950s ==
=== Great Flood of 1951 in Kansas ===
This event was the worst in Kansas since June 1903. Small rivers and creeks were running at bankfull over eastern Kansas when rainfall up to 254 mm (10.0 in) in 12 hours the last few days of June and the first few days of July caused rivers in Kansas to flood. After a break in the rainfall on July 4, heavy rains returned on July 5. At Manhattan, Kansas, at the intersection of the Big Blue River and Kansas River, flooding inundated 70 city blocks with water up to the second floor of stores along the main commercial street. The high waters moved downstream to Topeka, forcing 20,000 persons to evacuate, then on to Lawrence, causing their worst flood up to that time. The industrial districts which border the Kansas River in Kansas City were protected by a 10 m (33 ft) dike which was equipped with floodgates at each tributary and topped by an 2.4 m (7.9 ft) wall, which was designed to manage a flood 1.5 m (4.9 ft) higher than the June 1903 flood. The onset of floodwaters reached Kansas City, Kansas on July 12, and the Kansas River rose rapidly, reaching its peak stage on July 14. Water rose 15 cm (5.9 in) an hour until within a meter (3 ft) of the top of the dike. The piers of bridges were battered by debris and whole farmhouses which had been swept downstream. Weak areas of the levee were reinforced with the help of hundreds of workers sandbagging. Shortly before midnight July 13, the Kansas River broke the levee protecting the Argentine district, and residents were forced to flee to nearby bluffs. Early that morning, after the Armourdale district had been evacuated, a 6 km (3.7 mi) long wave of water began to cascade over the levee and inundated the district with 4.5 to 9 m (15 to 30 ft) of water. Many people were rescued by boats, out of trees, ledges and rooftops. Later that morning, the Central Industrial District was flooded even while Mayor Roe Bartle of Kansas City, Missouri was on an aerial inspection of the flood scene.

The livestock industry was paralyzed as packing plants were flooded and thousands of hogs and cattle were swept away. floodwaters made a canal out of Southwest Boulevard. A 23,000-liter (6,000-gallon) oil tank, caught in the current, struck a high tension wire and exploded, causing additional mayhem. The burning oil ignited the Phillips Petroleum Company oil tanks, which went up with a roar that rocked downtown Kansas City. Soon, eight city blocks were aflame as dozens of oil tanks exploded in a chain reaction that lasted five days. The Hannibal Bridge and A.S.B. Bridge were the only two highway bridges still operating. Several barges were torn loose and caught in the current about a kilometer (0.5 mi) upstream from the Hannibal Bridge. These barges threatened to destroy the remaining bridges but, fortunately, two of the barges arrived at the Hannibal Bridge at the same time and wedged against the bridge. The barges were quickly secured to the bridge with chains.

The Missouri River and the Kansas River threatened to spill into the Municipal (now Downtown) Airport, the Fairfax District, and North Kansas City that Friday night. Planes were evacuated, and North Kansas City residents were ordered to leave immediately. Thousands of men, with the help of trucks and bulldozers, worked through the night to support the dike, but the collapse of the Jersey dike early July 15 was the last straw as water began to pour into the Fairfax District. In anticipation of such a break, a second levee had been started in order to protect the Quindaro Utility Plant in the northwest corner of the district. The plant supplied water and electricity to more than 130,000 customers in Kansas City, Kansas. Shutting down the plant would have been disastrous as water hitting the 1,100 °C (2,010 °F) boilers would lead to a devastating explosion. Workers virtually removed a nearby clay hill in their efforts to build up and support the dike. By 4 AM Saturday, the dike was within 30 cm (0.98 ft) of being topped as the flood had crested. By Monday, waters were receding as fast as they had come up.

The flood caused more than one billion dollars (1951 dollars) and claimed 41 lives in the Midwest. In Kansas City only three persons drowned, but property damage was $870 million. Of the five industrial districts only North Kansas City was completely saved. The airport and the Quindaro plants were also spared from the worst.

=== California flood – 1955 ===
The storm affected the Central Sierra and South Bay areas. The Eel River on the North Coast saw the greatest flow of record to that time, while Central Valley rivers saw near-record flows. A statewide disaster was declared, and the storm resulted in 74 deaths and $200 million in economic losses. The heaviest 24-hour rainfall was recorded on December 20 when 389 mm (15.3 in) fell in Shasta County.

=== New England floods – 1955 ===
Flooding of the Connecticut River and Westfield River in August 1955 killed at least 87 people. The flood produced $8 million in damages, or over $100 million by today's standards.

== Decade of the 1960s ==
=== Michigan flood – April/May 1960 ===
Widespread heavy rains fell across the upper peninsula of Michigan in two time periods; April 24 to 26 and May 7 until 12. The two rain events led to 75–150 mm (3.0–5.9 in) of rain falling across northern Michigan over this three-week period. Residual snowpack in forested areas added to its effects. It was considered a once in 25–50 year event for much of the area, although many of the records set during this event stand today. Damage totaled US$575,000 (1960 dollars).

=== New Hampshire flood – April 1960 ===
This flood struck the Merrimack and Piscataquog rivers. It was the third highest flood on record in these areas.

=== California flood – 1962 ===
The Columbus Day storm brought high winds and record breaking rains. Rains fell from Oakland to Alturas with record-setting three-day rainfall for Lake Spaulding of 585.5 mm (23.05 in). A total of 174 gauge stations recorded their highest three-day rainfall totals to that time. The storm caused $4 million in damages.

=== West Coast tsunami – March 1964 ===
The Good Friday earthquake caused a tsunami in March 1964, which completely devastated the downtown district of Crescent City on the North Coast, resulting in 11 deaths and an economic loss of $14 million in Del Norte County alone. It was by far the worst damage done to any town in the contiguous United States by a tsunami. Substantial damage and numerous deaths also occurred in the towns of Valdez, Whittier, Chenega, Seward, Kodiak, Kalsin Bay and Kaguyak, Alaska, and Port Albini, British Columbia. Four children were swept to their deaths from a beach near Newport, Oregon, and lesser damage occurred all along the coast as far south as San Diego.

=== December 1964 flood in the Pacific Northwest ===
Significant snowfall preceded the event in early December. On December 18, dramatically warmer conditions coupled with nearly a 300 mm (0.98 ft) of rain led to excessive snow melt in the western Cascades. Downtown Salem was submerged under 3 metres (9.8 ft) of flood waters during the event. This flooding prompted flood control measures to be built along the Willamette River. This major flood between December 18, 1964, and January 7, 1965, also impacted portions of southwest Washington, Idaho, Nevada, and especially northern California. In Oregon seventeen people died as a result of the disaster, and it caused hundreds of millions of dollars in damage. The flooding covered 152,789 acres (618.32 km^{2}). The National Weather Service rated the flood as the 5th most destructive weather event in Oregon in the 20th century.

=== April 1965 flood of the Upper Mississippi River ===
Dubuque, Iowa, during the flood of 1965

The 1965 flood caused over five million dollars of damage in Clinton, Iowa, alone. The US Coast Guard sent Goldenrod to Niota, Illinois, due to flooding and cresting of levees.

=== June 14–20, 1965 flood in Colorado ===
"The 1965 flood that devastated Denver remains the most costly natural disaster in terms of property loss in state history. It also prompted the building of Chatfield Reservoir and Dam and changed the face of the city." - The Denver Post.

=== July 4, 1969, flood in Ohio ===
The Independence Day flood of 1969 was one of the worst in Ohio history, caused by 355 mm (14.0 in) of rain in 12 hours. This caused three large dams to fail, much property damage, and loss of life. Wayne County was one of the worst-affected areas.

=== Hurricane Camille flood in Virginia 1969 ===
On the night of August 19 into August 20, the remains of Hurricane Camille stalled due to high pressure in central Virginia. Within eight hours, at least 710 mm (28 in) of rain fell. This resulted in one of the worst natural disasters for Virginia in its 400 years of history. Debris flows and severe flooding claimed 150 lives, mainly from Nelson County.

== Decade of the 1970s ==
=== Southeast Oklahoma flood – December 1971 ===
Rainfall up to 406 mm (16.0 in) fell across the Little River basin. The Glover River rose high enough to deposit area cattle in trees. The Little River flooded tens of thousands of acres. This flood occurred after major reservoirs were built on these basins.

=== Buffalo Creek flood – February 1972 ===
The Buffalo Creek flood was a disaster that occurred on February 26, 1972, when the Pittston Coal Company's coal slurry impoundment dam #3, located on a hillside in Logan County, West Virginia, USA, burst four days after having been declared 'satisfactory' by a federal mine inspector. Out of a population of 5,000 people, 125 were killed, 1,121 were injured, and over 4,000 were left homeless.

=== New Braunfels–Seguin, Texas, flood – May 1972 ===
Heavy rain began falling in Comal County around 8 pm on May 11. At midnight, sixteen plus inches poured upon the Guadalupe River midway between New Braunfels and the Canyon Lake Dam. The first flood waters rushed into New Braunfels from Blieders Creek and flowed into the Comal River at Landa Park. The flood waters filled the Comal and overflowed into the Guadalupe River, where they roared towards Seguin. Recent construction of Canyon Dam located twenty five miles upstream gave residents a false impression that they would be secure from any flooding. However, the storm waters fell almost perfectly into the Guadalupe River watershed just below the Canyon Dam. Homes were uprooted by the rushing waters and washed downstream at New Braunfels towards Seguin. Nighttime mass evacuations were initiated, as families scrambled to shelters in the area. Many homes and vehicles were seriously damaged and destroyed in the floodplains along Lake Dunlap, Geronimo Creek, and Lake McQueeney. All the homes on Treasure Island and in Glen Cove basin were underwater. The river finally crested near 33 feet at Seguin. Fifteen persons were found to have drowned during this event.

=== Rapid City, South Dakota, flood – June 1972 ===
A frontal zone was banked up against the Black Hills of South Dakota on the morning of June 9. Heavy rainfall, with amounts of nearly 381 mm (15.0 in) near Keystone, mainly between 6 pm and midnight. Rapid Creek overflowed at 10:15 pm. Canyon Lake Dam failed at 10:45 pm, adding to the flood's magnitude. The flood crest, reached around 12:15 am, ravaged Rapid City and surrounding canyons. The death toll was 238.

The Rapid City Public Library hosts a more comprehensive digital archive of flood-related stories, photos and news accounts on their 1972 flood page.

=== Hurricane Agnes flood – June 1972 ===
Hurricane Agnes moved into the coast of the Florida panhandle as a weak hurricane. Weakening into a tropical depression over Georgia, a major trough in the Westerlies approached the cyclone, which subsequently strengthened Agnes over land back into a tropical storm in North Carolina, although it also developed a more western cyclone. The two moved in tandem, with Agnes moving offshore Norfolk, Virginia and becoming a strong tropical storm. Eventually, the western nontropical low wrapped Agnes inland, which was then absorbed over Connecticut. These cyclones led to 150–254 mm (5.9–10.0 in) of rain over North Carolina, with 254–483 mm (10.0–19.0 in) falling across the remainder of the Mid-Atlantic states. The flood unleashed by the system was the greatest natural disaster in damages for the United States up until that time.

=== Michigan floods – April 1975 ===
A major flood struck the Lower Peninsula of Michigan. In early April, a foot/30 cm of snow fell across the region. Intense rainfall on April 18 and 19 of 75–125 mm (3.0–4.9 in) fell over a short time frame into the residual snowpack, increasing the magnitude of the flood. The flood peaked between April 19 and 22, primarily in the Kalamazoo, Grand, Flint, and Shiawassee River basins. The recurrence interval for this kind of flood is 50–100 years. Lansing and Flint saw the most damage, which overall totaled US$50 million (1975 dollars).

=== Big Thompson Canyon flood in Colorado – July 1976 ===
Moist easterly flow went up the terrain of the Big Thompson River, forming thunderstorms beginning at 6 pm and lasting to 9 pm on July 31. 200 mm (7.9 in) of rain fell in one hour, with over 300 mm (0.98 ft) falling during the event. A 5.8 m (19 ft) high fall of water swept down the canyon, taking everything in its path downstream. It was one of the deadliest natural freshwater floods in U.S. history, as 143 people perished during the flash flood. Houses destroyed totaled 418. Overall damage was US$40 million (1976 dollars). In the aftermath of the storm, regulations were passed to limit development in similar canyons.

=== Eastern Kentucky flood – April 1977 ===
Record flooding in eastern Kentucky occurred when the three rivers in the region – the Cumberland, Big Sandy and Kentucky – overflowed due to five inches of rain. Governor Julian Carroll declared ten counties as disaster areas. Areas in West Virginia were also affected.

=== Kansas City Flash flood of 1977 – September 1977 ===
An estimated 400 mm (16 in) of rain caused the banks of Brush Creek to overflow into the Country Club Plaza area on the night of September 12, 1977. The flood caused 25 deaths and between $80 and $100 million in damages.

=== New England flood – 1978 ===
Flooding throughout the region caused millions of dollars in damage.

=== Tropical Storm Amelia floods – August 1978 ===
Tropical Storm Amelia skirted the lower Texas coast and went ashore south of Corpus Christi during the night of the July 30/July 31. The circulation was followed inland west of San Antonio on August 1 before becoming diffuse. Rainfall increased despite the lack of a surface circulation, and disastrous flooding occurred in many south Texas river basins, including the Guadalupe River and its tributaries. Extensive damage occurred, and 30 people lost their lives in the flood. The maximum rainfall total in Texas occurred in Medina, where 1,219 mm (48.0 in) of rain was deposited due to mesoscale convective systems firing along a frontal boundary induced by Amelia's remnant circulation aloft.

=== Frankfort, Kentucky flood – December 1978 ===
Reported as the worst flood since the Ohio River flood of 1937, the Kentucky River near Frankfort, Kentucky swelled after heavy rains.

== Decade of the 1980s ==
=== Lower Mississippi flood of 1983 ===
This was the second most severe flood in the lower Mississippi Basin since 1927. Red River Landing, Louisiana, was flooded for 115 days. Damages totaled US$15.7 million (1983 dollars).

=== Tropical Storm Octave (1983) flooding in Arizona ===
Tropical Storm Octave is considered the worst tropical cyclone in the history of Arizona. In Arizona, the highest rainfall total was 12.0 in (300 mm) at Mount Graham. In Tucson, flood waters were reportedly 8 ft (2.4 m) high. Throughout the state, excessive rainfall caused many rivers to overflow. After the rain event ended, the Santa Cruz, Rillito, and Gila rivers experienced their highest crests on record.

Five towns – Clifton, Duncan, Winkelman, Hayden, and Marana – were almost completely flooded. In Marana, many homes were submerged, forcing residents to be evacuated. Over 700 homes were destroyed in Clifton. In addition, 86 of the town's 126 business were heavily damaged due to the flooding. Around 3,000 buildings were destroyed due to Octave. A total of 853 houses, mobile homes, and apartments were destroyed while 2,052 others were damaged. About 10,000 people were temporarily left homeless. Damage in Arizona totaled $500 million (1983 USD), which was above the preliminary estimate of $300 million. Fourteen people drowned and 975 persons were injured. Elsewhere, Octave was responsible for $12.5 million in damage in New Mexico.

Following the storm, governor Bruce Babbitt declared a state of emergency. President Ronald Reagan declared Cochise, Gila, Graham, Greenlee, Pima, Pinal, Santa Cruz and Yavapai counties a "major disaster area".

=== Western floods of 1983 ===
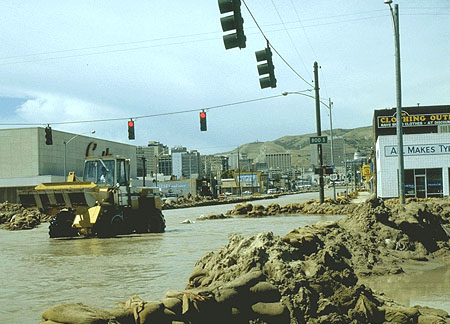
View of State Street looking north upstream during the 1983 City Creek flood

The year from July 1982 to June 1983 was the wettest on record both over the contiguous US as a whole and over the Western States. El Niño conditions brought consistently above-average precipitation to the West from August 1982 until April 1983 and led to the Pacific Coast mountains, the Sierra Nevada and most of the Intermountain West receiving record snowpack.

A big snowmelt in the Rocky Mountains led to record flooding on the Colorado River in 1983 (and again in 1984). Heavy and unseasonably late snows in May were followed rapidly by warm temperatures and record rainfall in early June. The resulting huge surge of water was not forecasted and not enough water was dumped from Colorado River reservoirs in time to compensate. High inflows forced opening of the emergency spillways at Glen Canyon and Hoover Dams for the first time since their construction except for brief tests. Releases from Hoover Dam reached a record high of 48,000 cubic feet per second (1,400 m^{3}/s) (much higher than the maximum allowed flood release of 28,000 cubic feet per second (790 m^{3}/s)), which damaged levees and riverside property along the Lower Colorado River Valley, resulting in seven deaths. However, this was still much lower than the peak inflow above Lake Powell, which was recorded at 122,700 cubic feet per second (3,470 m^{3}/s) on July 1.

The Colorado, which is usually dry at the mouth due to extensive diversions, reached the Gulf of California for the first time since the 1960s. Due to a spillway design error at Glen Canyon coupled with the relentless flooding, the dam at Glen Canyon very nearly failed, which would have emptied Lake Powell (the second-largest man-made lake in the US) and flooded out the entire lower valley of the Colorado River, cutting off water supplies to millions of people. By August as the water finally began to recede, the dam held, though only barely. Damages along the Colorado River amounted to about $80 million ($182 million in 2012 dollars).

In most of north and central California, the 1982–1983 "rain year" was the wettest on record, and was the wettest since 1937–1938 in the few areas where previous records were not surpassed. Levees burst along the Sacramento River and Feather River, flooding farmland in the Central Valley and several communities including Tehama, and high water also threatened the dikes in the Sacramento–San Joaquin Delta. Significant flooding also occurred on the usually dry Tulare basin north of Bakersfield, where over 28,000 acres (11,000 ha) were inundated. As much as $850 million of damages were recorded in California, amounting to more than $1.93 billion in 2012 dollars.

Central Utah was heavily affected. The flooding swelled City Creek, which normally flows through Salt Lake City via underground conduits. On May 28, debris clogged the conduits, causing the creek to overflow on State Street, one of the main thoroughfares of the city. Aggressive sandbagging managed to divert the flood waters to other underground rivers via State Street, but temporary pedestrian bridges were needed for several weeks. The Great Salt Lake in succeeding years reached a record high water level, flooding Saltair and other areas and causing traffic problems on I-80. The heavy rains also loosened soils in the Wasatch Range, causing a massive landslide which temporarily dammed the Spanish Fork (river), drowning the town of Thistle (which was never rebuilt following the floods).

=== Eastern floods of 1984 ===
A major storm on the East Coast of the United States brought tornadoes to North and South Carolina, killing approximately 60 people in that area, and delivering high winds to Boston before flooding the New York metropolitan area from March 29 to March 30 of 1984. New York City, Atlantic City and New Jersey all declared emergencies. Many homes were flooded, roads were closed, and numerous cars were discovered underwater. 2,500 people were evacuated to safety from Monmouth and Ocean Counties in New Jersey. Atlantic City, Brigantine Island, and Absecon Island were all cut off from major travel due to flooding and were under emergency declarations. 600 people in Milford and Fairfield, Connecticut, were also evacuated. In the New York tri-state area, power outages impacted 196,700 homes, while 48,000 homes were without power in the upstate region. The U.S. Army Corps of Engineers reported that three people died due to flooding and the area sustained hundreds of millions of dollars in damage.

=== Flooding in the central Appalachians – November 1985 ===
The antecedent event to this flood was the passage of Hurricane Juan to the west of the area, which led to over 175 mm (6.9 in) of rain in the Blue Ridge Mountains, though less than 25 mm (0.98 in) to the Mountain State. After Juan passed by, an occluded system moved slowly northward from the Gulf of Mexico through the Mid-Atlantic States during the first days of November, leading to significant rainfall for the central Appalachians. Local amounts of 508 mm (20.0 in) of rain were reported from West Virginia, worse than the flooding the state witnessed in 1888. This led to debris flows and widespread damage in the Upper Potomac River basin and Cheat River Basin in West Virginia and Virginia. Damage was severe where the South Branch joins the North Branch of the Potomac. The Paw Paw Tunnel was flooded. The death toll was 50 from West Virginia.

=== Northern California and Western Nevada floods of February 1986 ===
On February 11, a vigorous low pressure system drifted east out of the Pacific, creating a pineapple express that lasted through February 24 unleashing unprecedented amounts of rain on northern California and western Nevada. The nine-day storm over California constituted half of the average annual rainfall for the year. Record flooding occurred in three streams that drain to the southern part of the San Francisco Bay area. Extensive flooding occurred along the Napa and Russian rivers. Napa, north of San Francisco, recorded their worst flood to this time while nearby Calistoga recorded 736 mm (29.0 in) of rain in 10 days, creating a once-in-a-thousand-year rainfall event. Records for 24 hour rain events were reported in the Central Valley and in the Sierra Nevada. One thousand-year rainfalls were recorded in the Sierras. The heaviest 24-hour rainfall ever recorded in the Central Valley at 447 mm (17.6 in) occurred on February 17 at Four Trees in the Feather River basin. In Sacramento, nearly 254 mm (10.0 in) of rain fell in an 11-day period. System breaks in the Sacramento River basin included disastrous levee breaks in the Olivehurst and Linda area on the Feather River. Linda, about 65 km (40 mi) north of Sacramento, was devastated after the levee broke on the Yuba River's south fork, forcing thousands of residents to evacuate. In the San Joaquin River basin and the Delta, levees breaking along the Mokelumne River caused flooding in the community of Thornton and the inundation of four Delta islands. Lake Tahoe rose 15 cm (5.9 in) as a result of high inflow. The California flood resulted in 13 deaths, 50,000 people were evacuated and over $400 million in property damage. Three thousand residents of Linda joined in a class action lawsuit, Paterno v. State of California, which eventually reached the California Supreme Court in 2004. The California high court affirmed the District Court of Appeal's decision that said California was liable for millions of dollars in damages.

=== Michigan floods – September 1986 ===
A slow-moving storm system moved from the central Plains into the Great Lakes. Rainfall amounts by September 10 were 200–330 mm (7.9–13.0 in) over a two-day period. Damage was unprecedented. Dam failure abounded with a total of 14 dams undermined and an addition 19 dams at risk during the event. Four major bridges failed. Thousands of acres of sugar beets, beans, potatoes, corn, and other vegetables were in ruin. A total of six people perished during the flood. Damage totaled US$500 million (1986 dollars), and 30 counties were declared Federal disaster areas.

=== Androscoggin River flood – April 1987 ===
The largest and most destructive flood in the history of the Androscoggin River in Maine occurred due to four days of rain combined with melting snow and ice flows. Hardest hit areas included Lewiston, Rumford, and Mexico. Jay's industrial section was inundated.

== Decade of the 1990s ==
=== May to September 1992 Alaska floods ===
From May to September 1992 in Alaska a combination of ice jams, snow melt, and heavy rains caused the worst flooding in this area. It is said to be one of the worst disasters recorded here. Rivers reached record stages during this flood.

=== January 1993 Arizona floods ===
An unusual series of storms from the Pacific Ocean starting on January 6, 1993, and continuing through January 19, 1993, caused heavy and prolonged precipitation across the State of Arizona. These heavy rains caused the most widespread and severe flooding in Arizona since the turn of the century.

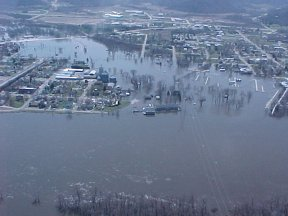
Flooding in Wabasha, Minnesota, 1993

=== Great Flood of 1993 along Mississippi River ===
Soils became saturated in the fall of 1992 across the Midwest. Numerous rounds of showers and thunderstorms from mid-June into August led to significant flooding. Over 1,000 mm (39 in) of rainfall fell in isolated spots. Some areas of the Mississippi Valley were flooded for over 200 days, leading to destruction spread across nine states. This was the flood of record along many of the streams and rivers that feed the Mississippi and Missouri rivers. Around 60,000 homes were damaged or destroyed. The death toll was 50 and damage totaled US$800 million. The result of this flood was an aggressive campaign by the federal government to buy out flooded agricultural land from willing sellers.

=== Tropical Storm Alberto floods in the Southeast 1994 ===
Tropical Storm Alberto made landfall in the Florida Panhandle before stalling south of Atlanta, Georgia. Flooding was near or at record levels for the Flint, Ocmulgee, Chattahoochee, Choctawhatchee, and Apalachicola rivers. Americus, Georgia saw the heaviest rain in a 24-hour period, when 536 mm (21.1 in) was recorded. The death toll was 33, with two-thirds coming from people driving into flooded areas. Thousands of homes were destroyed. Damage totaled US$750 million (1994 dollars).

=== Hurricane Rosa, The Great Southeast Texas Flood of 1994, and San Jacinto River Fire ===
Also called The San Jacinto River flood of 1994 or The October Flood of 1994. Residual moisture from Hurricane Rosa and a low-pressure system drawing moisture from the Gulf of Mexico stalled over a 38-county wide area centered around Houston, Texas. The rainfall and flooding affected an area roughly the size of the state of Maine. Over 4-5 days, the average rainfall depth over the 2,880-square mile San Jacinto River (Texas) watershed was 19.5 inches, reaching a maximum of 29-30 inches in some areas. Record stream flows were recorded at 25 of 43 stations within the affected area. Days after the rain stopped and the flood waters began to recede, a 40-inch pipeline and other smaller pipelines ruptured. Hundreds of thousands of gallons of gasoline along with diesel fuel, crude oil, and natural gas poured into the river resulting in burning masses of debris on fire that flowed atop of the flood waters downriver. At least 17 people died as a result of the flood; damage was estimated at US$800 million (1994 dollars).

=== California flood – January and March 1995 ===
During the events of January and March 1995, over 100 stations recorded their greatest 1-day rainfalls in that station's history. The major brunt of the January storms hit the Sacramento River basin and resulted in small stream flooding primarily due to storm drainage system failures, though flooding affected nearly every part of the state. The Salinas River exceeded its previous measured record crest by more than 1.3 m (4.3 ft), which was within 30–60 cm (0.98–1.97 ft) of the reputed crest of the legendary 1862 flood. The Napa River set a new peak record, and the Russian and Pajaro rivers approached their record peaks. More than thirty people were killed and 5 were missing. The flood cost $1.8 billion.

=== May 8, 1995, Louisiana flood ===
A stalled front led to excessive rains across southeast Louisiana. Rainfall up to 500 mm (20 in) fell across New Orleans, with 250 mm (9.8 in) falling within a six-hour period. Seven lives were lost, 35,000 homes were flooded along with thousands of businesses across southeast Louisiana. Damage estimates were around US$1 billion (1995 dollars).

=== Northeast United States flood of January 1996 ===
Significant snowfall during the first 20 days of January led to a snowpack across the region. Some areas of the Northeast had received two to three times their average precipitation since December 1. Significant snowpack was in place on January 18. Then, a period significant warming took place across the East, mainly during a 30-hour period, which led to ice jam floods across western Pennsylvania and New York. Surface dew points rose into the 50s and 60s Fahrenheit/teens Celsius, which rapidly melted the snowpack. Then, a heavy rain event occurred along a frontal zone moving in from the west, which led to 25–27 mm (0.98–1.06 in) of rainfall between January 18 and 19. Some areas lost 30–60 cm (0.98–1.97 ft) of snow in only 12 hours, which led to the bulk of the flooding.

The Ohio and Susquehanna rivers experienced their highest river crests since Hurricane Agnes and Hurricane Eloise. The Delaware River at Trenton, New Jersey saw its highest crest since Hurricane Connie and Hurricane Diane moved by in 1955. The South Branch of the Potomac, as well as the Cheat and Monongahela rivers in West Virginia and Pennsylvania experienced their highest levels since early November 1985, which was the flood of record for the region. A total of 33 people died during the event, with 18 from Pennsylvania and 9 from New York. It was the worst flood event for the Mid-Atlantic states as a whole since 1985.

=== Willamette Valley flood of 1996 ===
This was the biggest flood for the region since December 1964. Above normal rainfall had been occurring since November 1, 1995, which led to significant snowpack in the mountains by late January. Western Oregon then experienced a 150–300 mm (5.9–11.8 in) of rainfall on February 5 to 7, which in combination with temperatures rising into the 60s Fahrenheit/upper teens Celsius led to the flood.

=== New England flood – October 1996 ===
A stationary front across the region drawing moisture from Hurricane Lili led to extreme rains across New England. Factories and mills in Lawrence, Haverhill, and Lowell, Massachusetts were severely impaired during the event. A total of 81 bridges needed to be rebuilt after the flood. A large portion of Hartford, Connecticut was submerged.

=== 1997 California New Years Floods ===
The 1997 California New Years Floods resulted from a series of winter storms, from December 26 to January 3 of 1997, fed with tropical moisture by an atmospheric river. It impacted Northern California, resulting in some of the most devastating flooding since the Great Flood of 1862. Similarly to the 1862 event, the flooding was a combined effect of heavy rainfall and excessive snowmelt of the relatively large early-season Sierra Nevada snowpack. The resulting flooding in the Central Valley and other low-lying areas forced over 120,000 people from their homes and caused over $2 billion in property damage alone. 48 out of California's 58 counties were declared disaster areas with many streamflow gauge stations in these areas recording return intervals of over 100 years. It would take months for the worst-hit areas to recover fully.

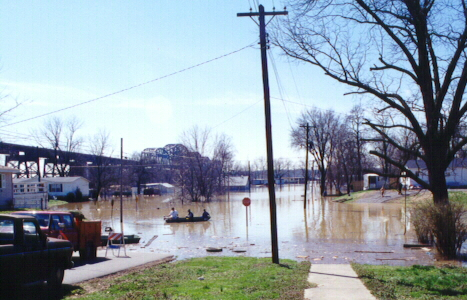
Smithland, Kentucky during March 1997 flood

=== Ohio River Valley flood of March 1997 ===
150–300 mm (5.9–11.8 in) of rain fell upon northern Kentucky and southern Ohio between March 1 and 3. A total of six states were impacted by the event. Record flooding was witnessed along most rivers in northern Kentucky, surpassing that of 1937. Near-record flooding was recorded in Ohio, mainly along Brush Creek and the Scioto and Great Miami rivers. Eastern sections of Higginsport went underwater, leaving only one route in and out of town. It was Ohio's worst flood in 30 years. The death toll from the event was 33, with 21 lives lost in Kentucky and 5 lost in Ohio. Hundreds were injured. Much of the devastated Kentucky city of Falmouth moved to higher ground after the flood.

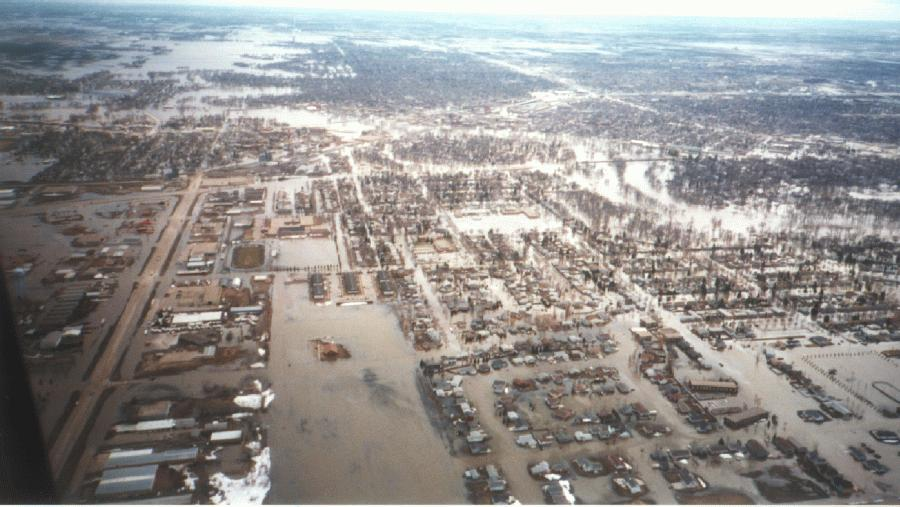
Flooding in Grand Forks, 1997

=== 1997 Red River flood ===
The prior winter was one of the snowiest on record for the northern Plains, with 297 cm (117 in) falling at Fargo, North Dakota. During the spring thaw, this creates problems as it is usually colder in southern Canada, which makes ice jam flooding a major concern for this river basin. Starting in early February, a major flood was anticipated, over two months before the flood. This gave the region plenty of time to sandbag the nearby dikes. The river began rising on April 4, and flooding the area on April 18 as the flood waters rose up to 1.5 m (4.9 ft) above the long term prediction. Dikes gave way, and Grand Forks was inundated. Between 75 and 90% of the residents had been evacuated prior to this time. Fires began to break out on the 19th as electric lines shorted out, which destroyed 11 buildings in downtown. The river and associated flood waters began to recede on April 23.

=== Fort Collins, Colorado, flood of July 1997 ===
On July 27, upslope flow into the Front Range of the Rockies forced dewpoint temperatures to around 16 °C (61 °F). By 5 pm local time, thunderstorms began to erupt. Within 30 minutes, local amounts of 50 mm (2.0 in) had fallen near Laporte and Livermore, with 50 mm (2.0 in) more falling near Loveland before the storm weakened around 8 pm. South of Fort Collins, new thunderstorm development began around 10 pm, which spread north through the city, dumping another 12 mm (0.47 in) of rain before dissipating. Around midnight on July 28, upslope flow increased behind a cold front that triggered the initial thunderstorms. Steady rains began around 1 am, ending for the most part around 4 am for much of the region except for a narrow swath including Fort Collins, where rains continued towards 7 am. However, rains renewed across the region between 8 am and noon. An additional 150–200 mm (5.9–7.9 in) of rain had fallen near Laporte. By that evening, thunderstorms redeveloped. Starting at 7 pm, heavy rains fell at Colorado State University. Between 8:30 and 10 pm, very heavy rains struck Fort Collins again. A total of over 250 mm (9.8 in) fell during this time frame, which brought storm totals to 368 mm (14.5 in) in southwest Fort Collins. The ensuing flooding of Spring Creek caused a freight train to derail and completely destroyed two mobile home parks. Damage totaled in the hundreds of millions of dollars. Five people died. This flood event helped spawn a developing rainfall mesonet for the United States, known as CoCoRAHS, which was anticipated to help detect ongoing flash flood events in real-time.

=== Texas 1998 floods ===
In 1998, Tropical Storm Charley affected the Lower Brazos River watershed. Most of the flooding occurred in the Rio Grande River basin causing 13 deaths and $50 million in damages. A major flood event occurred in Central Texas after 30 inches of rainfall in a few hours. The Little River experienced the fifth largest discharge in its history. Flooding also occurred in the South Fork San Gabriel watershed and the Mill Creek watershed. Property damage of $750 million and 29 deaths were reported primarily in the Colorado and Guadalupe river basins.

=== Central and South Texas flood of October 1998 ===
A tropical connection of moisture from Hurricane Madeline intercepted a stationary frontal zone, leading to extreme rainfall. Between October 17 and 18, rain totals of up to 559 mm (22.0 in) were recorded across central and southern Texas, which led to the flood of record in southern Texas. A total of 31 perished during the event, 17 of which were found in flooded vehicles. Damage approached US$750 million (1998 dollars).

=== Hurricane Floyd floods in North Carolina – September 1999 ===
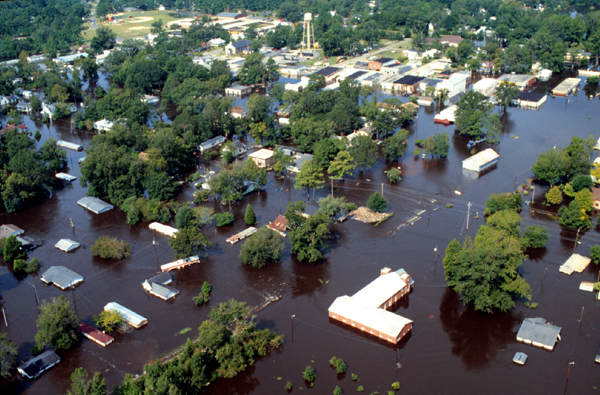
Flood image from just after Floyd

The antecedent conditions to Hurricane Floyd included the passage of Tropical Storm Dennis through the Mid-Atlantic states during the first week of September. Only 10 days later, the combination of a stalled frontal zone, strong dynamics aloft, and a hurricane moving up the East Coast led to excessive rainfall from North Carolina northward up the Eastern Seaboard between September 14 and 17, with amounts of near 508 mm (20.0 in) being reported near Wilmington, North Carolina, and 150–300 mm (5.9–11.8 in) falling farther up the coast. It was the most damaging flood in the history of North Carolina. In New Jersey, the Raritan River and other rivers went over their banks, causing flooding in Bound Brook and New Brunswick, among other places. In New Hampshire, the storm flooded Belknap, Cheshire, and Grafton counties. Of the 57 deaths attributed to Floyd, 46 were due to drowning in the flood; 35 from North Carolina alone. Damage estimates were near US$5 billion (1999 dollars).

== See also ==
- Floods in the United States before 1900
- Floods in the United States (2000–present)
- Great Flood of 1993
- Hurricane Agnes
- Hurricane Camille
- Hurricane Floyd
- May 8, 1995 Louisiana flood
- Napa River flood of 1986
- Red River flood, 1997
- Tropical Storm Alberto (1994)
- Tropical Storm Allison (1989)
- United States tropical cyclone rainfall climatology
- Willamette Valley flood of 1996

== Related links ==
- California's Historic floods
- Dates in Nashville USACE History
- Environmental History of Androscoggin River
- Historic Flooding in Fort Collins, Colorado
- Names of Persons Killed by Big Thompson Flood
- NWS Service Assessments of Significant Weather Events
- New Hampshire Floods
- North-Central Pennsylvania Floods
- The Flood of 1951 in Northeast Kansas (NWS Topeka, KS)
- Panoramic Photographs from the Library of Congress
- The Black Hills Flood of 1972 (NWS Rapid City, SD)
- Teton Flood Museum
- Upper Texas Coast Tropical Cyclones in the 2000s (NWS Houston/Galveston, TX)
