= Canyon Lake Gorge =

Limestone gorge in Texas, US

Coordinates: 29°51′40″N 98°11′24″W

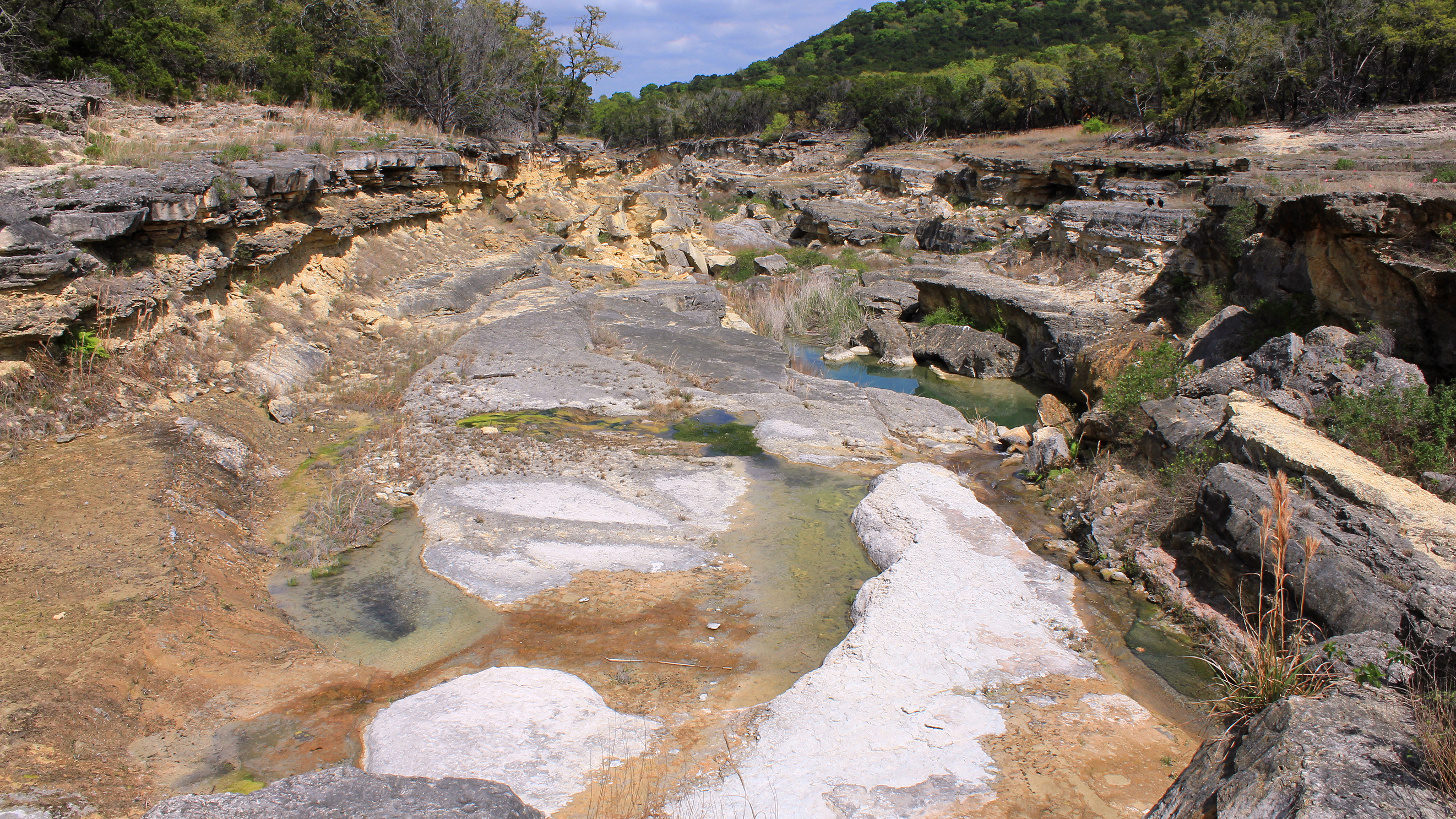
Part of Canyon Lake Gorge

Canyon Lake Gorge is a limestone gorge in Texas, which is around 1 mile (1.6 km) long, hundreds of yards (metres) wide, and up to 50 feet (15 m) or more deep, which was exposed in 2002 when extensive flooding of the Guadalupe River led to a huge amount of water going over the spillway from Canyon Lake reservoir and removing the sediment from the gorge. The gorge provides a valuable exposure of rock strata as old as 111 million years showing fossils and a set of dinosaur tracks, and forms a new ecosystem for wildlife with carp and other creatures in a series of pools fed by springs and waterfalls.

The Gorge Preservation Society formed as a local citizen's group to develop long-term plans for the Gorge in partnership with the Guadalupe-Blanco River Authority and the U.S. Army Corps of Engineers. Public access to the gorge is restricted to guided tours by the Society along a designated route for a hike lasting about three hours. Availability of tours is limited, no pets are permitted and no rock or fossil collecting is allowed. Research permits can be obtained by university or scientific research groups.

== July 2002 flood ==
In July 2002 up to 67,000 cubic feet (1,900 m^{3}) of water per second flowed over the spillway of Canyon Lake, Texas for approximately six weeks, the first time the spillway had been in use since the reservoir dam was constructed in 1964. Normally, the flow out of the reservoir is around 350 cubic feet (9.9 m^{3}) of water per second. The Guadalupe River basin forms a part of Flash Flood Alley which is one of the river basins most prone to flash flooding in the world. Nine people were killed by the flood over a 20 miles (32 km) stretch of the river, which damaged or destroyed 48,000 homes and cost around $1 billion in damages, but the Canyon Lake manager has stated that even though the floodwaters went over the spillway, the dam still prevented an estimated $38.6 million in damages downstream during the event.

== Educational and natural resource ==
On November 29, 2005, a ceremony was held in which representatives of the Guadalupe-Blanco River Authority and the U.S. Army Corps of Engineers signed an agreement to develop the gorge as an educational and natural resource.

== Significance for geologists ==
The 2002 flood at Canyon Lake and subsequent rapid formation of Canyon Lake Gorge presented a unique opportunity to study the geomorphological power of rapidly moving water and to better understand the process of canyon formation.

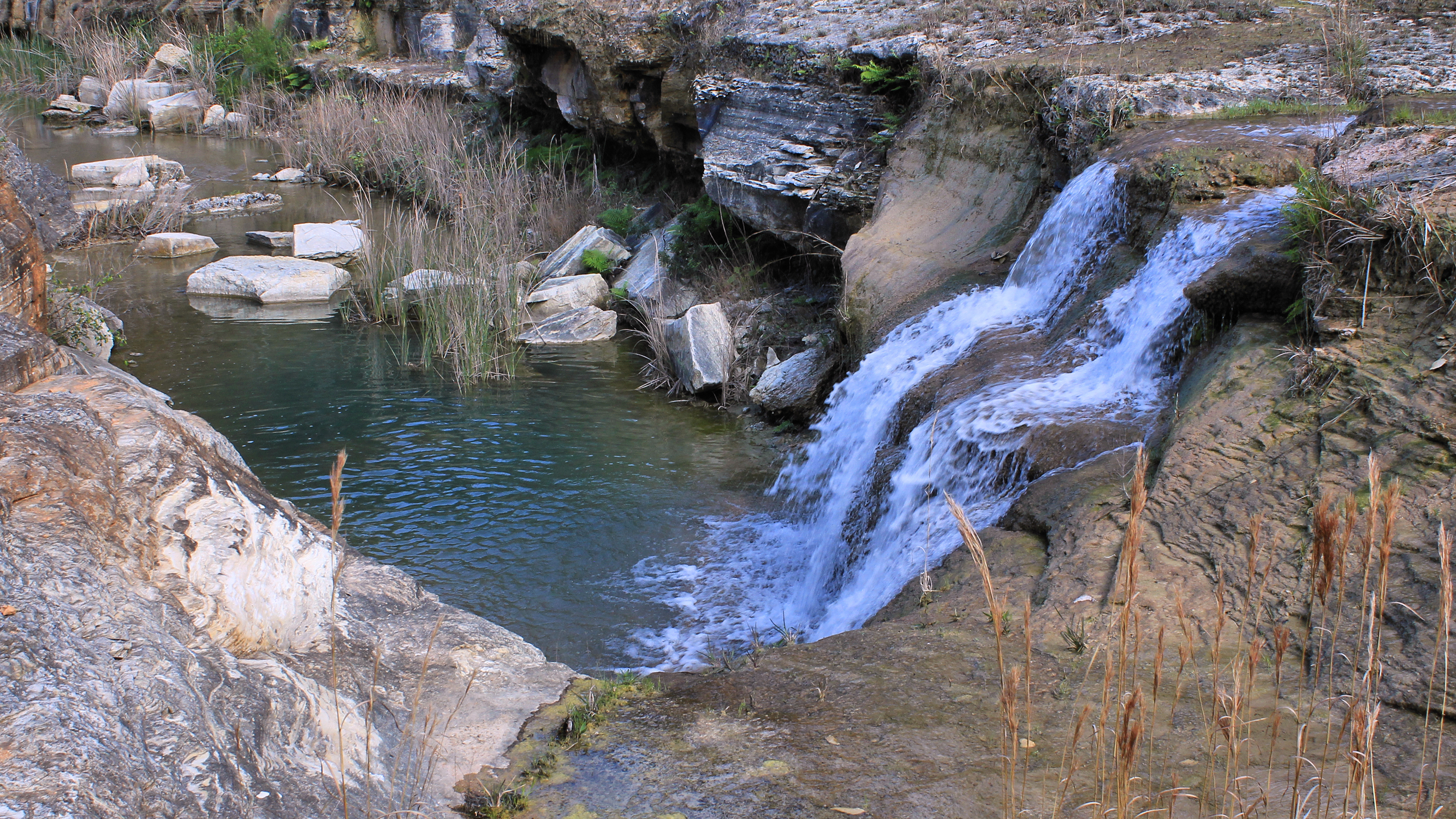
Waterfalls and boulders in Canyon Lake Gorge

In their 2010 study, Michael Lamb of the California Institute of Technology and Mark Fonstad of Texas State University documented the dramatic transformation of a section of the Guadalupe River Valley landscape into a steep-walled bedrock canyon in just three days. The scientists documented the excavation of bedrock limestone to an average depth of over 20 feet and average width of 130–200 feet for a distance of over one mile. The “plucking” and transport of massive boulders from the site resulted in the formation of several waterfalls, inner channels, and bedrock terraces. The abrasion of rock by sediment-loaded water sculpted walls and created plunge pools and teardrop-shaped “streamlined islands”. Although some of the geological formations present in the gorge are known to be associated with rapidly flowing flood water (such as the streamlined islands), other formations (such as the inner channels, knickpoints and terraces) have traditionally been interpreted through the “long ago and very slow” paradigm of geologic time in response to shifting climate or tectonic forcing.

Typically, a steep-walled narrow gorge is inferred to represent slow persistent erosion, but because many of the geological formations of Canyon Lake Gorge are virtually indistinguishable from other formations which have been attributed to long term (slower) processes, the data collected from Canyon Lake Gorge lends further credence to the hypothesis that some of the most spectacular canyons on Earth may have been carved rapidly during ancient megaflood events. Additionally, because the flood conditions under which the gorge was formed are known, Canyon Lake Gorge provides a means of developing improved computer model reconstructions of pre-historic floods to determine water volume, flood duration and erosion rates.
