= Espiritu Santo Bay =

Bay in Texas, US

Coordinates: 28.346°N 96.534°W

Espiritu Santo Bay is a northeastern extension of San Antonio Bay in Calhoun County, Texas. It is separated from Matagorda Bay by a line of barrier islands that run south from Port O'Connor to Matagorda Island.

== History ==
Espiritu Santo is Spanish for Holy Spirit, a title bestowed to several bays along the coast of the Gulf of Mexico. This name formerly applied to several waterways in the Matagorda Bay locale.

== Features ==
The sixteen mile long, five mile wide body is an extension of San Antonio Bay, and is included in the Guadalupe River estuary. Oak trees and grass are common along the bay's shore, which includes the bayside of Matagorda Island and the Texas mainland. This shoreline consists of miles of unspoiled beach, which along with the atmosphere, serves as a habitat for countless birds including the endangered whooping crane. In the waters and tidal flats, oyster reefs and mixed mud, as well as sand and shell make up the bed. Blue green algae is the main organism in this bottom area. Deeper into the waters, redfish, trout, and flounder reside. These creatures are the main catch of fishermen who frequent the site.
