= Kuy Creek =

River in the United States of America

Coordinates: 28.5148°N 96.8964°W

- Map

Location
- Country: United States
- State: Texas

Physical characteristics
- Mouth: Guadalupe River

Kuy Creek is a stream in the U.S. state of Texas.

Kuy Creek derives its name from the Kay family of settlers.

== See also ==
- List of rivers of Texas
