= San Antonio Bay =

Estuary bay on the Texas coast

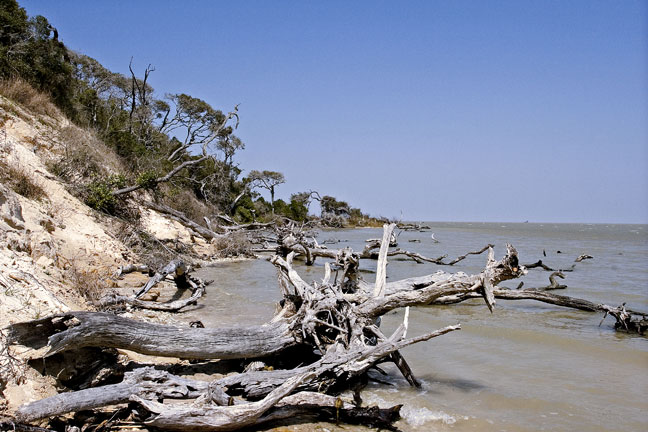
- The shore of San Antonio Bay

- Location within Texas

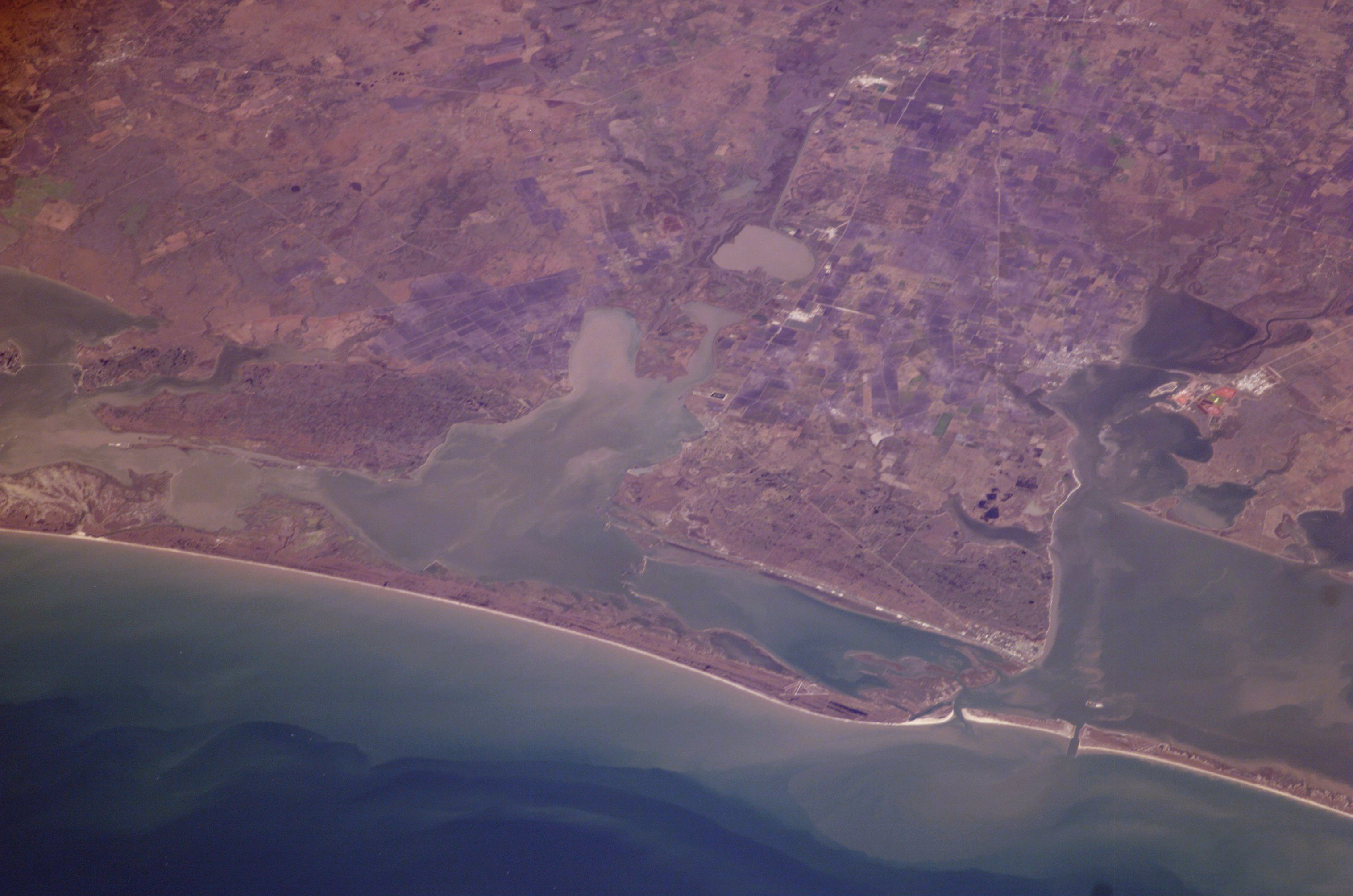
- View from the International Space Station
- Location: Texas Gulf Coast
- Coordinates: 28°18′19″N 96°44′17″W
- River sources: Guadalupe River
- Ocean/sea sources: Gulf of Mexico
- Basin countries: United States
- Surface area: 143,000 acres (58,000 ha)

San Antonio Bay is a bay on the Texas Gulf Coast situated between Matagorda and Aransas Bay. It consists mainly of the combined waters of the San Antonio and Guadalupe rivers, and is located at the mouth of the Guadalupe River, about 55 miles (89 km) northeast of Corpus Christi and 130 miles (209 km) southeast of San Antonio. It is protected from the Gulf of Mexico by Matagorda Island, leaving only relatively small and distant outlets to the Gulf for little mixing of bay and Gulf waters. The remoteness of the bay has prevented the establishment of major ports as seen on Aransas Bay and Corpus Christi Bay, to the south.

San Antonio Bay is one of seven major estuaries along the Gulf Coast of Texas. The Aransas National Wildlife Refuge is found on the southwest portion of the bay.

== History ==
The Karankawa Indians used the land near the Guadalupe River delta and San Antonio Bay for camping purposes. They also populated Matagorda Island on the opposite side of the bay. Captain Luis Cazorla of Presidio La Bahía crossed San Antonio Bay to visit the island in 1776, and discovered that the Indians had killed the mates of a shipwrecked British trading vessel. For a short time, he convinced the Indian leaders not to kill shipwreck survivors on the island. An effort was made to convert the Indians with the establishment of Mission Refugio on San Antonio Bay in 1793, after Fray José Francisco Garza found a shallow crossing that the Indians used to travel to the mainland. To prevent the Indians from using Matagorda Island as a hiding place to stage attacks, La Bahía commandant Juan Cortés burned and cut brush around the point of crossing. No permanent colony was ever established on the island.

After the arrival of white settlers to the baytown of Hynesville in the 19th century, the Karankawa began to commit offenses against the settlers, including the unsanctioned slaughter of their livestock. As a result, the settlers engaged the Indians at the 1852 Battle of Hynes Bay, near the San Antonio Bay extension of Hynes Bay. The Karankawa were swiftly defeated, and the survivors agreed to never return; finding refuge across the Rio Grande in Tamaulipas. A few years later, the Hynes extension began to fill with mud, leaving it shallow and hard to navigate. Reports from Hynesville suggest that alligators infested the bay, killing a few residents.

At the beginning of the 20th century, Preston R. Austin set out to build a new port on the western shore. He established the town of Austwell in 1911, and quickly began dredging in 1914 to build a channel. In the early stages of development, the channel filled with mud and was abandoned. Meanwhile, on the eastern shore, the city of Seadrift, which had been established following the American Civil War, began to develop into a place of interest for fishing and shipping. The town, which was most likely named for floating debris swept ashore by the Guadalupe River, was incorporated in 1912, and by 1914 had a population of 1,250. The growth subsided in 1919, after a hurricane ravaged the area. In 1926, only 321 lived in the town. The population slowly recovered, and had surpassed its original peak in 1990, following a wave of Vietnamese refugees, who emigrated to the city after the Vietnam War. In 2000, the city had 1,352 residents.

== Features ==
Ayres Bay (orange), Espiritu Santo Bay (red), Guadalupe Bay (cyan), Hynes Bay (blue violet), Mission Lake (pink), Pringle Lake (brown), San Antonio Bay (green)

The land near the bay lies on the Texas Coastal Plain. It consists of grassy prairies, which support conifers and water-tolerant hardwoods. Most of the surrounding land is used for agricultural purposes with the exception of Aransas National Wildlife Refuge, which is preserved for wildlife.

On average, the San Antonio Bay system is 2 meters (6.6 ft) deep, and covers approximately 531 square kilometers (205 sq mi). The system is made up of the bay itself and its extensions. The main extensions include: Espiritu Santo Bay, to the bay's east; Hynes Bay, to the northwest, and Guadalupe Bay due north.

Together with its extensions, San Antonio Bay forms one of seven major estuaries along the Gulf Coast of Texas, receiving the discharge from the converged San Antonio and Guadalupe rivers. Every second, approximately 116 cubic meters (31,000 U.S. gal) of water flows into the bay. Minimal seawater exchange with the Gulf of Mexico occurs at Cedar Bayou and Pass Cavallo. As a result of the seawater exchange, the bay's salinity is 13 parts per thousand (ppt), compared to the seawater average of 35 ppt.

== Ecosystem ==
A wide variety of wildlife can be found in and around San Antonio Bay. According to Texas Parks and Wildlife, the following fish have been caught in the bay: palmetto bass, striped bass, hardhead catfish, black drum, red drum, crevalle jack, southern kingfish, ladyfish, lefteye flounder, pinfish, spotted seatrout, and the sheepshead.

The shores along the bay, specifically the Aransas National Wildlife Refuge, are home to countless birds including the endangered whooping crane, pelicans, herons, egrets, roseate spoonbills, shorebirds, ducks, and geese. American alligators, collared peccaries, feral hogs, coyotes, bobcats, raccoon and white-tailed deer as well as clams and crabs are included among the bay's diverse wildlife. Several pelicans that had been rescued and cleaned after the Deepwater Horizon oil spill, were brought to the shore of San Antonio Bay in June 2010.

== Industry ==
Nearly detached from the Gulf of Mexico by barrier islands, San Antonio Bay does not support a large shipping industry. The only port of merit on the bay is Seadrift, where a shipping channel has been dredged to the Gulf Intracoastal Waterway. Most inhabitants near the bay work at chemical, crab-picking, and aluminum plants.

For centuries, oyster farming has been a mainstay of the surrounding economy. However, in December 2009, commercial harvesting was suspended after the norovirus was discovered in several exported crops, resulting in a recall.
