= Guadalupe Bay =

Bay in Texas, United States

Coordinates: 28.440242°N 96.768608°W

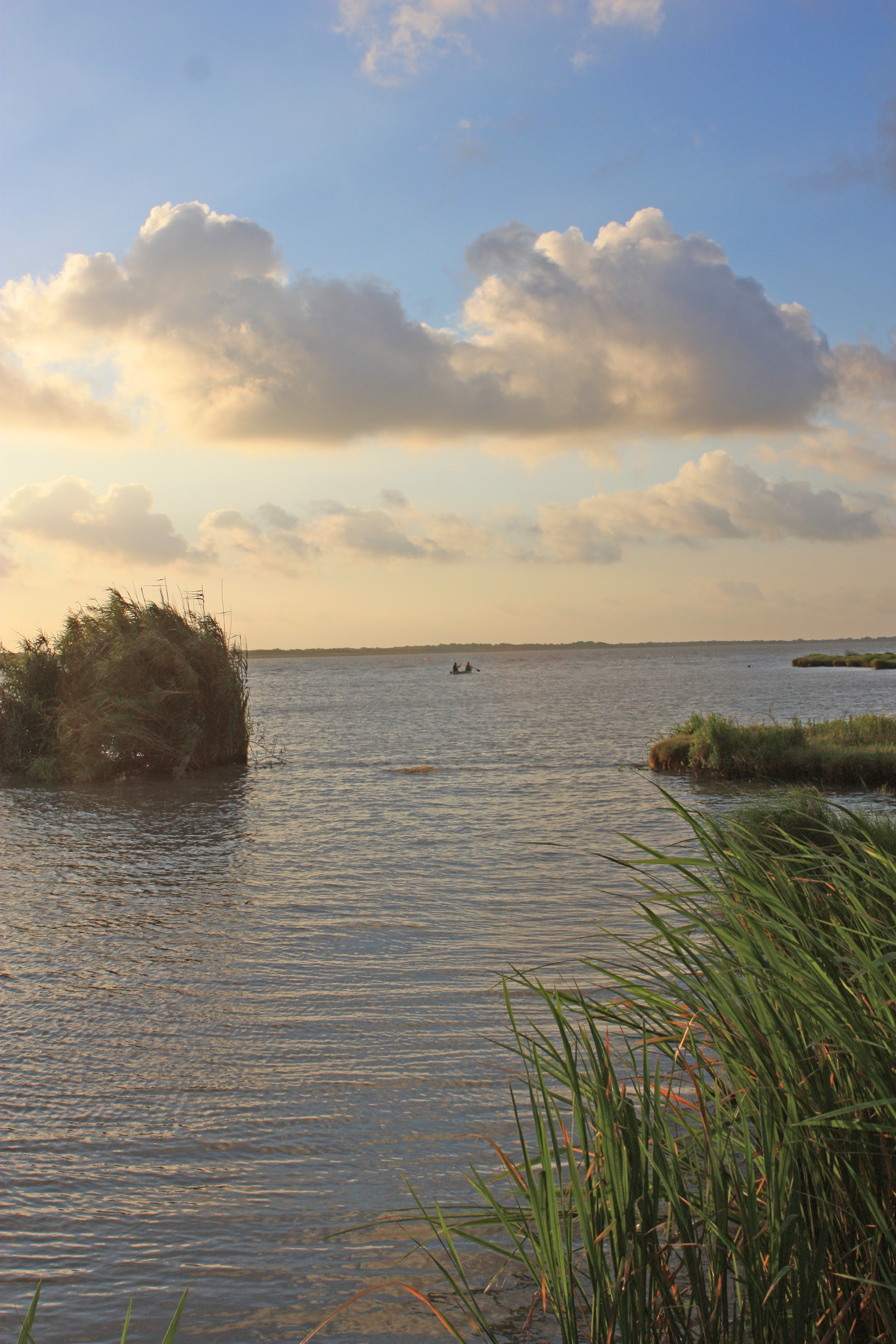
Mouth of the North Guadalupe River at Guadalupe Bay

Guadalupe Bay is a slender inlet of San Antonio Bay in Calhoun County, Texas, United States, near the settlements of Seadrift and Long Mott. It is fed by the Guadalupe River, and is the site of the river's two mouths.

== History ==
The bay is named after the Guadalupe River, which was named in honor of Our Lady of Guadalupe by Alonso De León.

The bay formed as the Guadalupe River delta discharge extended into San Antonio Bay, forming the subdelta headland now found between Hynes and Guadalupe Bays. While the bay's current form only dates to about 500 years ago (and continues to change), human settlement predates the current form. The Karankawa Indians resided on Guadalupe Bay sporadically during the past 2,500 years. Archeological evidence suggests that during the active periods, the Karankawa migrated seasonally between the bays and the inland. During the winter, groups of about 500 would arrive at the bay to fish, hunt and collect shellfish. The salinity of the bay decreased as the San Antonio River joined with the Guadalupe River about 1,500 years ago, diminishing the shellfish population.

By 1967, dredging was complete on the Victoria Barge Canal from Victoria to the Intracoastal Waterway, and ran along the shore of Guadalupe Bay. During construction, ancient artifacts and middens were discovered. Shortly thereafter, the Guadalupe Bay Archeological Site was established.

== Ecosystem ==
Finfish found in the bay include black drum, redfish, sheepshead and spotted seatrout. In the upper reaches, the freshwater varieties of channel catfish, flathead catfish and gar have been caught. Oysters are native to the bay, but cannot be harvested due to restrictions by the state. Shrimping is likewise prohibited due to its classification as a nursery bay.
