= Riverside Nature Center =

Non-profit arboretum in Kerrville, Texas, US

Coordinates: 30.050819°N 99.147449°W

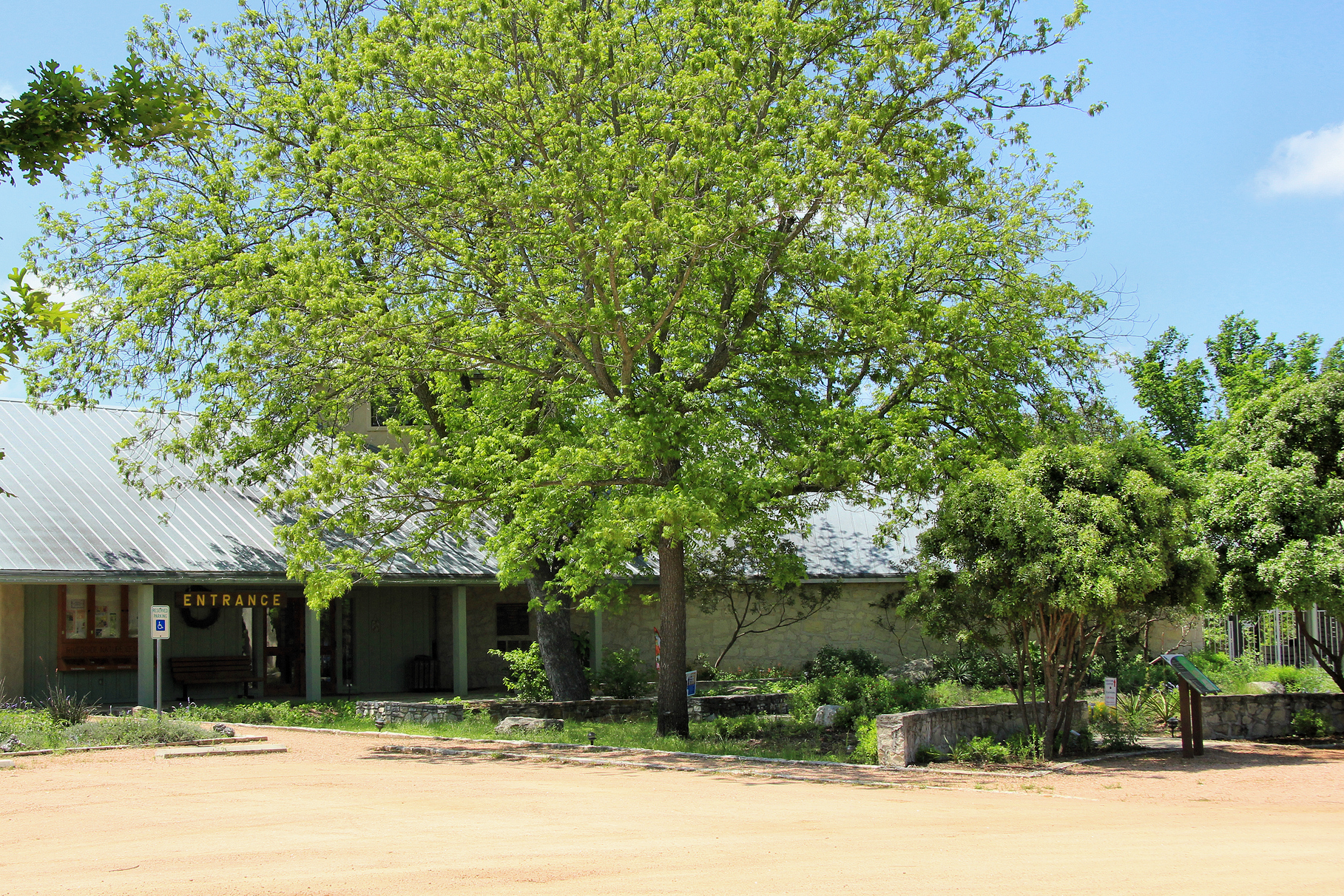
- Interactive map of Riverside Nature Center
- Type: Arboretum
- Location: 150 Francisco Lemos Street, Kerrville, Texas
- Website: riversidenaturecenter.org

The Riverside Nature Center is a non-profit arboretum with wildlife and native plant sanctuary located on the Guadalupe River at 150 Francisco Lemos Street, Kerrville, Texas. The gardens are open daily without charge.

The center was first envisioned in 1987 by Susan Sander, with the Riverside Nature Center Association (RNCA) organized in 1989. Today's site was purchased in 1992. With extensive clearing and planting, it has become an arboretum with over 140 tree species, approximately 200 species of wildflowers, cacti, shrubs, and native grasses. It also contains a butterfly plant garden, sensory garden with Braille signs, and natural area with river trail.

== See also ==
- List of botanical gardens in the United States
