= Long Mott, Texas =

- Unincorporated community
- Location within Texas Location within the United States
- Coordinates: 28°28′57″N 96°45′38″W
- Country: United States
- State: Texas
- County: Calhoun
- Elevation: 26 ft (7.9 m)
- Time zone: UTC-6 (Central (CST))
  - Summer (DST): UTC-5 (CDT)
- Area code: 361
- GNIS feature ID: 1340496

Long Mott is an unincorporated community in Calhoun County, Texas, United States. According to the Handbook of Texas, the community had a population of 76 in 2000. It is part of the Victoria, Texas Metropolitan Statistical Area.

== Geography ==
Long Mott is located south of the intersection of Texas State Highway 185 and Farm to Market Road 2235 in western Calhoun County. It is near Guadalupe Bay.

== Education ==
In 1892, a school was founded in Long Mott. In 1955, students from Long Mott began to be bused to Port Lavaca schools after the Long Mott school district was merged into the broader county school district.
