= Canyon Lake (Texas) =

Man-made reservoir in Texas, United States

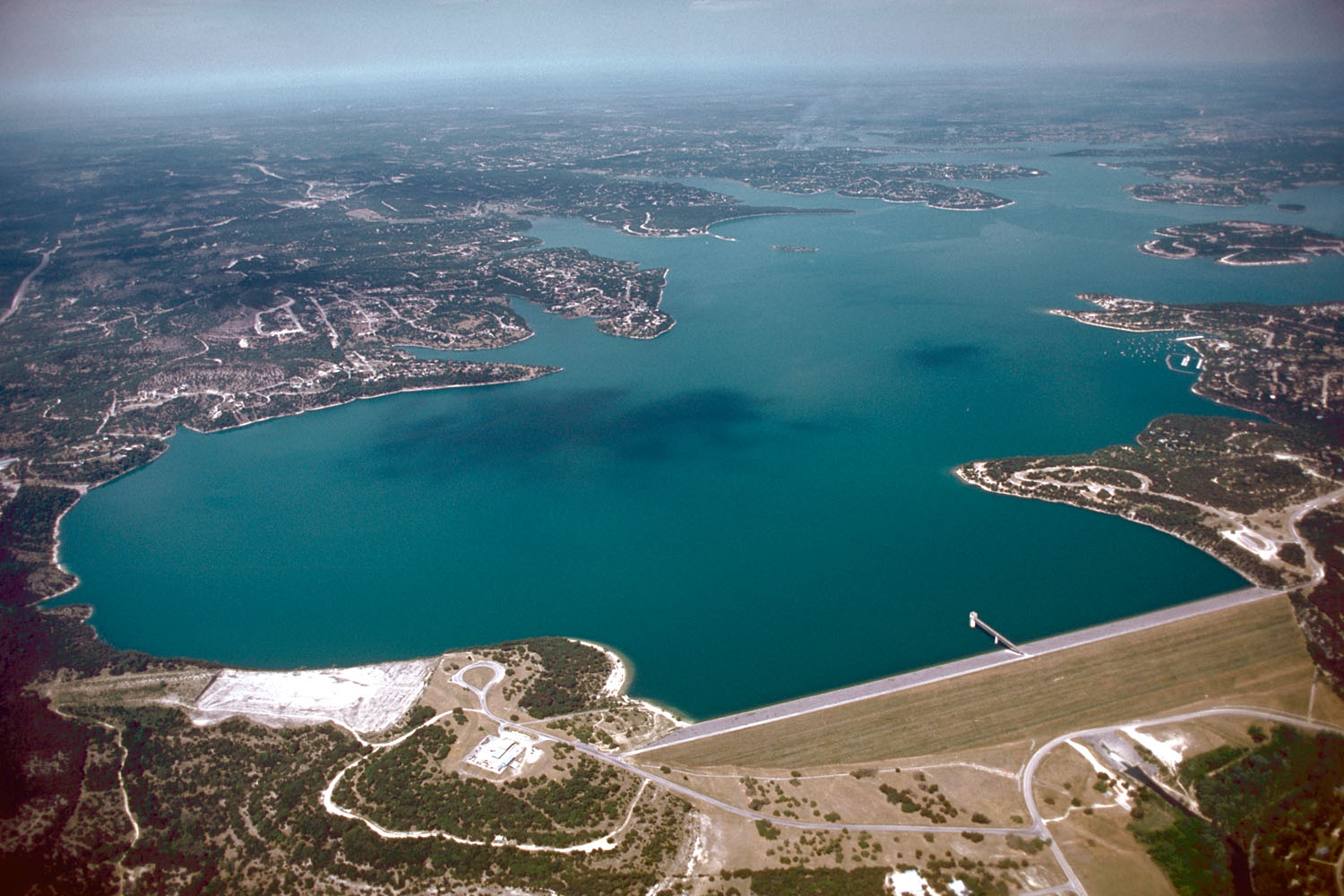
- Aerial view of Canyon Lake and Dam

- Location within Texas Location within the United States
- Location: Texas Hill Country, Comal County, Texas, US
- Coordinates: 29°52′53″N 98°14′24″W
- Type: Flood control reservoir
- Primary inflows: Guadalupe River
- Primary outflows: Guadalupe River
- Basin countries: United States
- Surface area: 8,230 acres (33.3 km^{2})
- Max. depth: 134 ft (41 m)
- Water volume: 382,000 acre⋅ft (0.471 km^{3})
- Shore length^{1}: 80 mi (130 km)
- Surface elevation: 909 ft (277 m)
- ^{1} Shore length is not a well-defined measure.

Canyon Lake is a reservoir on the Guadalupe River in the Texas Hill Country in the United States. Canyon Lake is a U.S. Army Corps of Engineers reservoir formed on the Guadalupe River in Comal County by Canyon Dam, which is located about sixteen miles northwest of New Braunfels. The dam, lake, and all adjacent property are managed by the U.S. Army Corps of Engineers. Water rights, waste water treatment, and hydroelectric generating facilities are managed by the Guadalupe-Blanco River Authority. Construction of the dam began in 1958 and was completed in 1964. The reservoir serves to provide flood control and water supply for the communities downstream from the dam. The lake is also a popular recreational destination.

== Geography ==
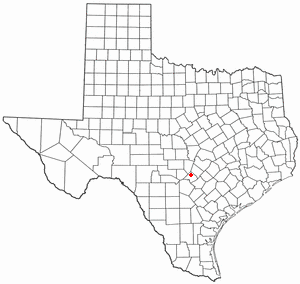
Location of Canyon Lake, Texas

Canyon Lake is located at 29°52′53″N 98°14′24″W. Please note, this GPS coordinate does not correspond to a public access location (please see the section below on Public Access in the Recreation section). It is located in northern Comal County, Texas, on the northeastern fringe of the San Antonio-New Braunfels MSA. It is about 35 mi (56 km) northeast of Downtown San Antonio and 40 mi (64 km) southwest of Austin. Towns in the immediate vicinity of the lake include Canyon City, Cranes Mill, Hancock, Fischer, Sattler, and Startzville, all part of the census-designated place known as Canyon Lake, Texas. Larger towns nearby include New Braunfels and San Marcos.

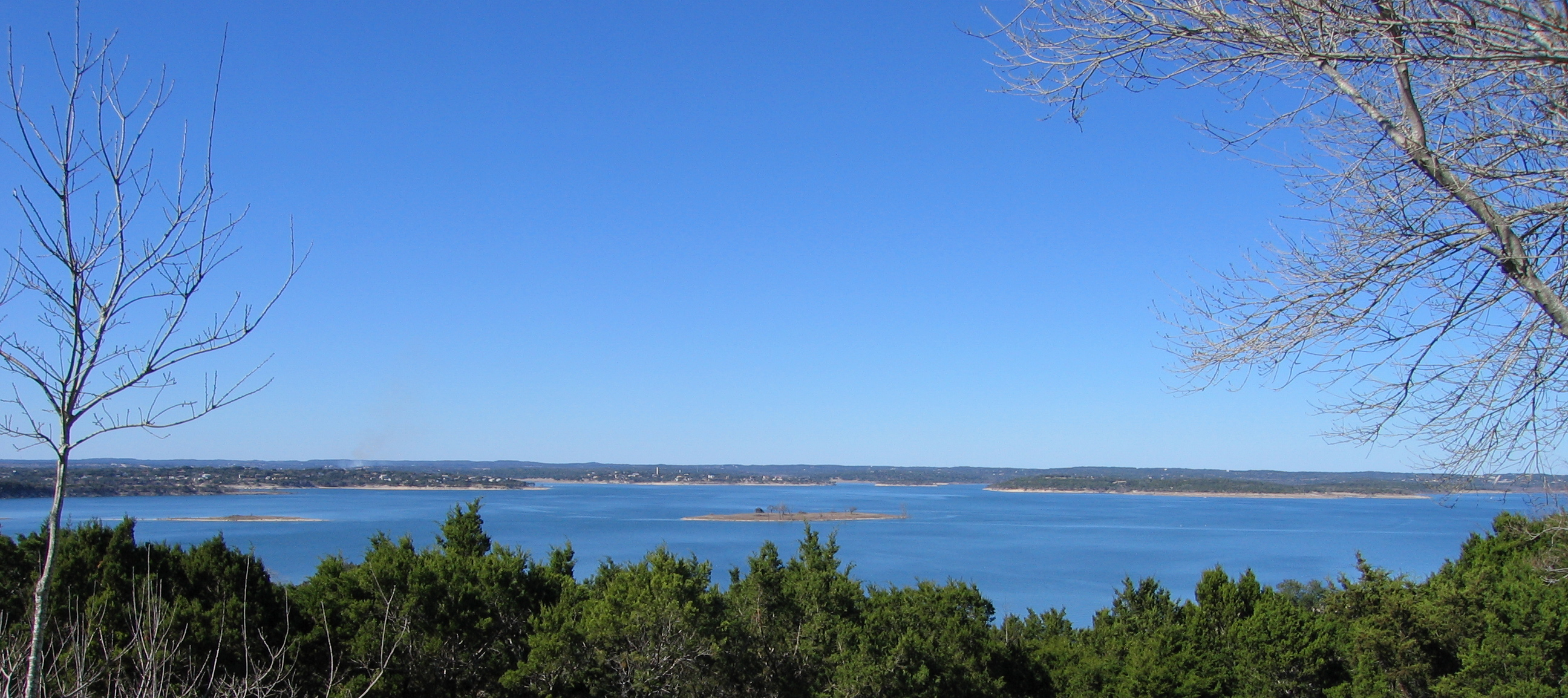
Canyon Lake

== History ==
Construction of Canyon Dam began in 1958 to provide both flood control and water conservation. Impoundment of the lake began in 1964, and the lake was filled to its conservation level in 1968. Two mostly deserted towns were flooded with the creation of Canyon Lake: Hancock and Crane's Mill.

== Flood protection ==
Flood protection is provided for nearly 250 square miles (650 km^{2}) of land downstream from Canyon Dam. The canyons of the upper Guadalupe River have a capacity to carry 40,000–50,000 cubic feet per second (1,100–1,400 m^{3}/s); however, the channel on the lower Guadalupe River, downstream from the Balcones Escarpment, can carry only 13,000–30,000 cubic feet per second (370–850 m^{3}/s). This has led to serious flooding in the lower Guadalupe River Basin, including a major flood in New Braunfels in 1972 which was caused by heavy rains just downstream from Canyon Dam.

Canyon Dam protected downstream areas from major floods in 1978, 1987, 1991, 1992 and 1998. A record flood in July 2002 overtopped the spillway by more than seven feet (2.1 m) and caused significant damage below Canyon Dam.

In the 2002 flood, the peak flow was about 70,000 cubic feet per second (2,000 m^{3}/s). The amount of water that flowed over the spillway was about 3½ times the amount of water that the reservoir holds. Erosion over the course of three days washed away bedrock below the spillway to reveal what is now the Canyon Lake Gorge. Water continued to flow over the spillway for six weeks.

== Water conservation ==
The Guadalupe-Blanco River Authority (GBRA) has rights to the water in the conservation pool of the lake. This water is used to operate several small hydroelectric plants downstream from New Braunfels and for municipal water supply, irrigation, and industrial uses. GBRA built a hydroelectric facility at Canyon Dam in August 1987; it was put into service in February 1989.

== Recreation ==
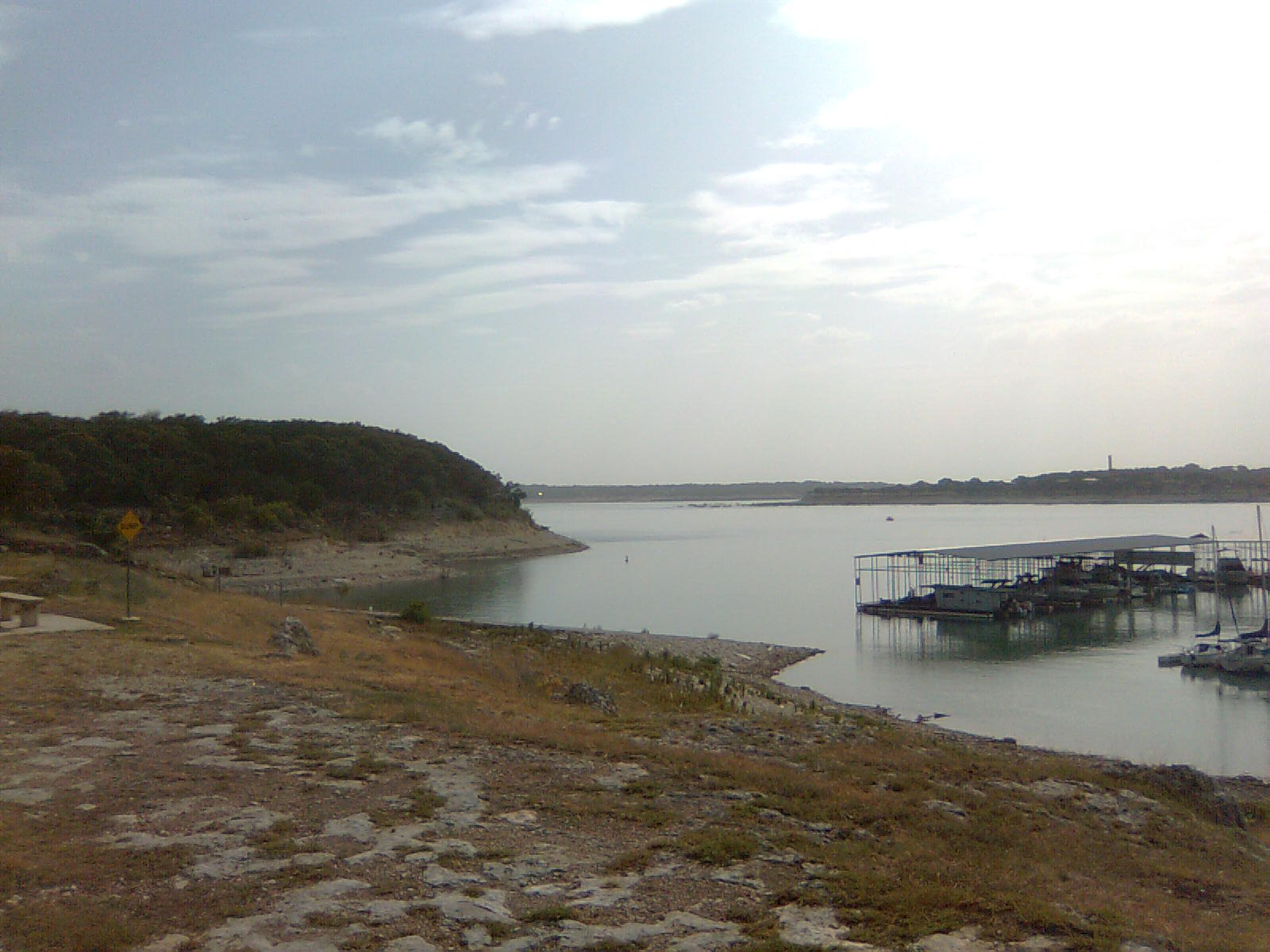
A view of Canyon Lake

Canyon Lake is a center for recreation in the area. The Corps of Engineers built and maintains eight park areas around the lake for camping, swimming, boating and picnicking. Bank fishing is available in all park areas, and a fishing dock can be found in Cranes Mill Park on the south side of the lake. Comal County provides several public boat ramps for access to the lake. Hike, bike and equestrian trails are available, as is limited hunting (archery only) and professional fishing guide services.

There are several public parks on the shores of Canyon Lake that allow access to the lake for swimming, fishing and boating.

There are 2 marinas located on the lake. The marinas have boats and jet skis available for rent.

There are several public boat ramps on the lake as well as private boat ramps. Public access boat ramps are available free of charge. The private boat ramps at the marinas or in some of the parks are available to the public for a fee. There is no fishing or swimming allowed at any of the boat ramps.

== Lake level concerns ==
Plans by GBRA to sell water from Canyon Lake to supply the fast-growing San Antonio and Austin regions have raised concerns that the lake will fall well below the established conservation pool level, potentially causing problems ranging from erosion and weakening of Canyon Dam to a decline in property values and possible health issues from the exposure of long-submerged land. This has led to several administrative actions and lawsuits over the future of Canyon Lake.

On September 1, 2023, Canyon Lake dropped to its lowest pool level on record. As the water level continued to drop, ruins started appear that had previously been under water, including an old bridge and rubble from an old house. A cave that had previously been under water also became accessible without the use of diving equipment.

On June 9, 2025, the amount of water flowing into Canyon Lake reached lows not seen in 100 years.

2026 Hill Country Floods

As of July 21, 2026, the downstream effects from the 2026 Hill Country Floods has filled up Canyon Lake to 909.09 ft.
