= Canyon Dam (Texas) =

Dam on the Guadalupe River, Texas, US

Coordinates: 29°52′07″N 98°11′51″W

- A view of Canyon Dam from the south
- Interactive map of Canyon Dam
- Country: the United States
- Location: on the Guadalupe River

The Canyon Dam in Texas is a rolled-earth dam on the Guadalupe River in the Hill Country. The water impounded by the dam forms Canyon Lake.

== Geography ==
Canyon Dam is located 36 miles (58 km) northeast of San Antonio and 38 miles (61 km) southwest of Austin.

The dam is 6,830 feet (2,080 m) long, across a narrow section of the Guadalupe River valley. The top of the dam is 974 feet (297 m) above sea level, or 224 feet (68 m) above the riverbed. A spillway, located south of the dam, protects the dam by releasing water when the lake level rises to 943 feet (287 m) above sea level.

The dam is located near the Balcones Escarpment. The rocky canyons to the west of the escarpment can carry more water than the riverbeds of the plains to the east; this has caused problems with flash flooding in cities and towns east of the escarpment.

== History ==
After major floods on the Guadalupe River in 1936 and 1938, state and community leaders pressured the federal government to help control flooding of the river. Congress authorized initial funds for construction of a dam in the Rivers and Harbors Act of 1945; final construction approval came in the Flood Control Act of 1954.

Construction of Canyon Dam began in 1958 to provide both flood control and water conservation. Impoundment of the lake began in 1964, and the lake was filled to its conservation level in 1968. The dam was built by the Tencon Corporation of Fort Worth, Texas. The United States Army Corps of Engineers controls the physical operations; and water in the lake is managed by the Guadalupe-Blanco River Authority.
