= Guadalupe River (Texas) =

River in Texas, United States

Guadalupe River Río Guadalupe
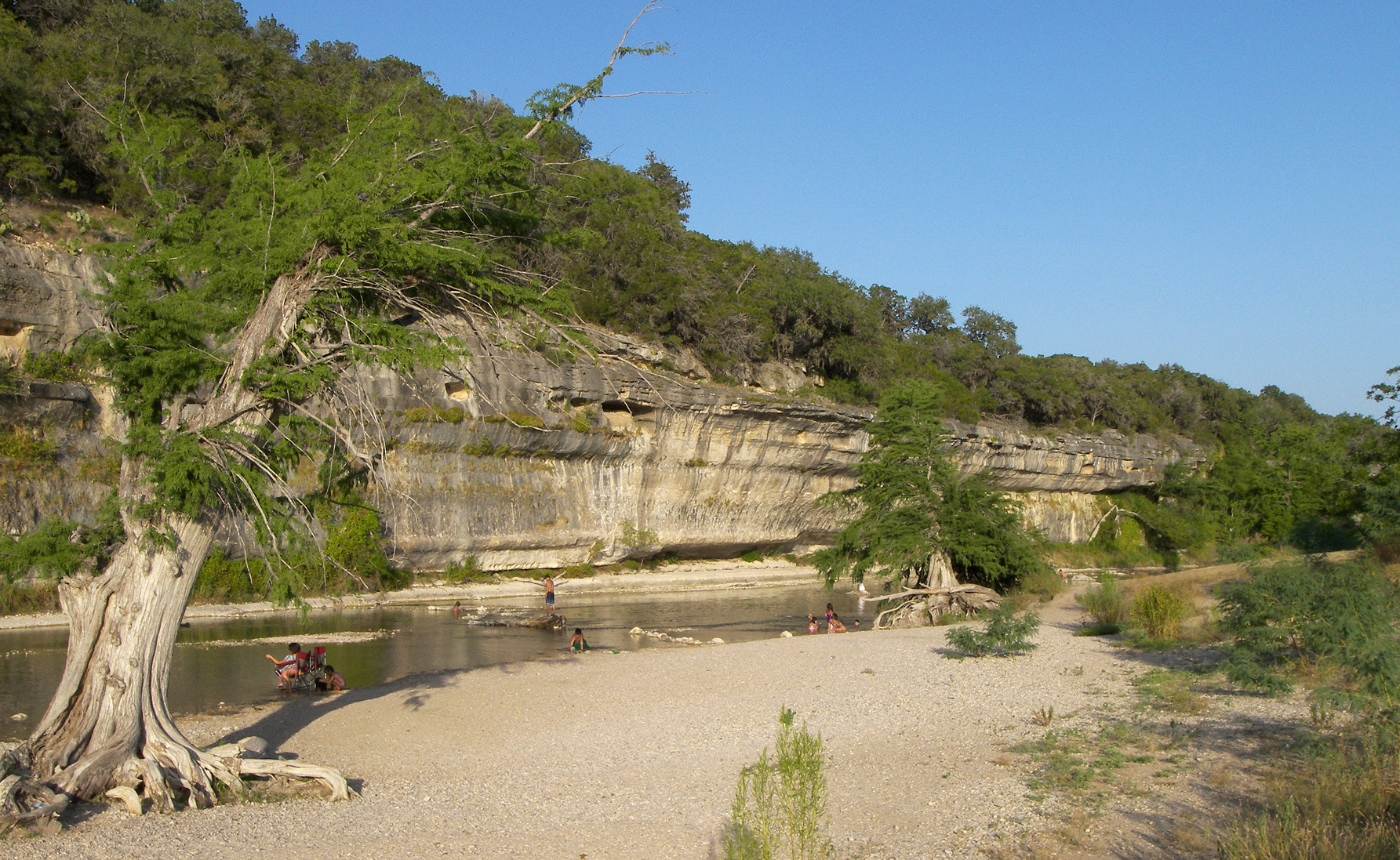
- A bluff at Guadalupe River State Park

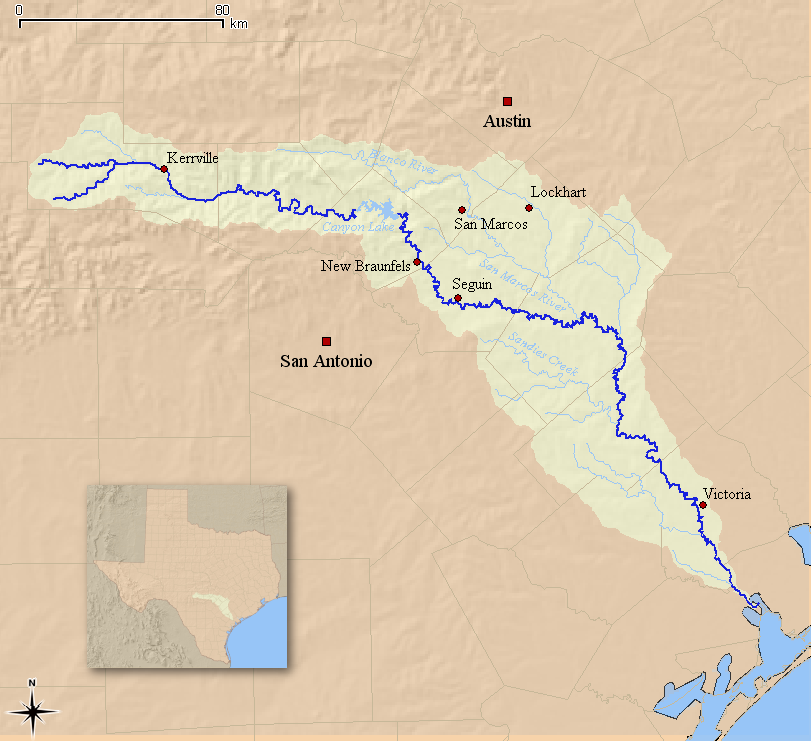
- Map of the Guadalupe River watershed
- Etymology: Named after Nuestra Señora de Guadalupe

Location
- Country: United States
- State: Texas
- Region: Texas Hill Country, Texas Coastal Bend

Physical characteristics
- Source: Kerr County, Texas
  - coordinates: 30°05′17″N 99°38′32″W
  - elevation: 676 m (2,218 ft)
- Mouth: San Antonio Bay, Gulf of Mexico
  - coordinates: 28°24′07″N 96°46′57″W
  - elevation: 0 m (0 ft)
- Length: 370 km (230 mi)
- Basin size: 17,353 km^{2} (6,700 sq mi)
- Discharge
  - average: 34 m^{3}/s (1,200 cu ft/s)

Basin features
- Tributaries
  - left: Rebecca Creek
  - right: Turtle Creek

The Guadalupe River (/ˌɡwɑːdəˈlup/; Spanish pronunciation: [gwaðaˈlupe]) runs from Kerr County, Texas, to San Antonio Bay on the Gulf Coast. It is a popular destination for rafting, fly fishing, and canoeing. Larger cities along it include Kerrville, New Braunfels, Seguin, Gonzales, Cuero, and Victoria. It has several dams along its length, the most notable of which, Canyon Dam, forms Canyon Lake northwest of New Braunfels.

The river, and the larger area around it known as Texas Hill Country, is prone to flash flooding. Its nickname is Flash Flood Alley.

== Course ==
The upper part, in the Texas Hill Country, is a small, fast stream with limestone banks, shaded by pecan and bald cypress trees. It is formed by the convergence of the North and South Fork Guadalupe. It is popular for tubing; users often float down it on inflated tire inner tubes during the spring and summer. East of Boerne, on the border of Kendall County and Comal County, it flows through Guadalupe River State Park, one of the more popular tubing areas along it.

The lower part begins at the outlet of Canyon Lake, near New Braunfels. The section between Canyon Dam and New Braunfels is the most heavily used for recreation. It is a popular destination for whitewater rafters, canoeists, kayakers, and tubers. When the water is flowing at less than 1,000 cu ft/s (28 m^{3}/s) there can be hundreds if not thousands of tubes on this stretch. At flows greater than 1,000 cu ft/s (28 m^{3}/s), there are very few tubes on the water. Flows greater than 1,000 cu ft/s (28 m^{3}/s) and less than 2,500 cu ft/s (71 m^{3}/s) are ideal for rafting and paddling. The flow is controlled by Canyon Dam, and by the amount of rainfall the area has received. It is joined by the Comal River in New Braunfels and the San Marcos River about two miles (3 km) west of Gonzales. The part below the San Marcos River, as well as the latter, is part of the course for the Texas Water Safari.

The San Antonio River flows into it just north of Tivoli. Ahead of the entry into the San Antonio Bay estuary, it forms a delta and splits into two distributaries, the North and South parts, which both flow into the San Antonio Bay estuary at Guadalupe Bay.

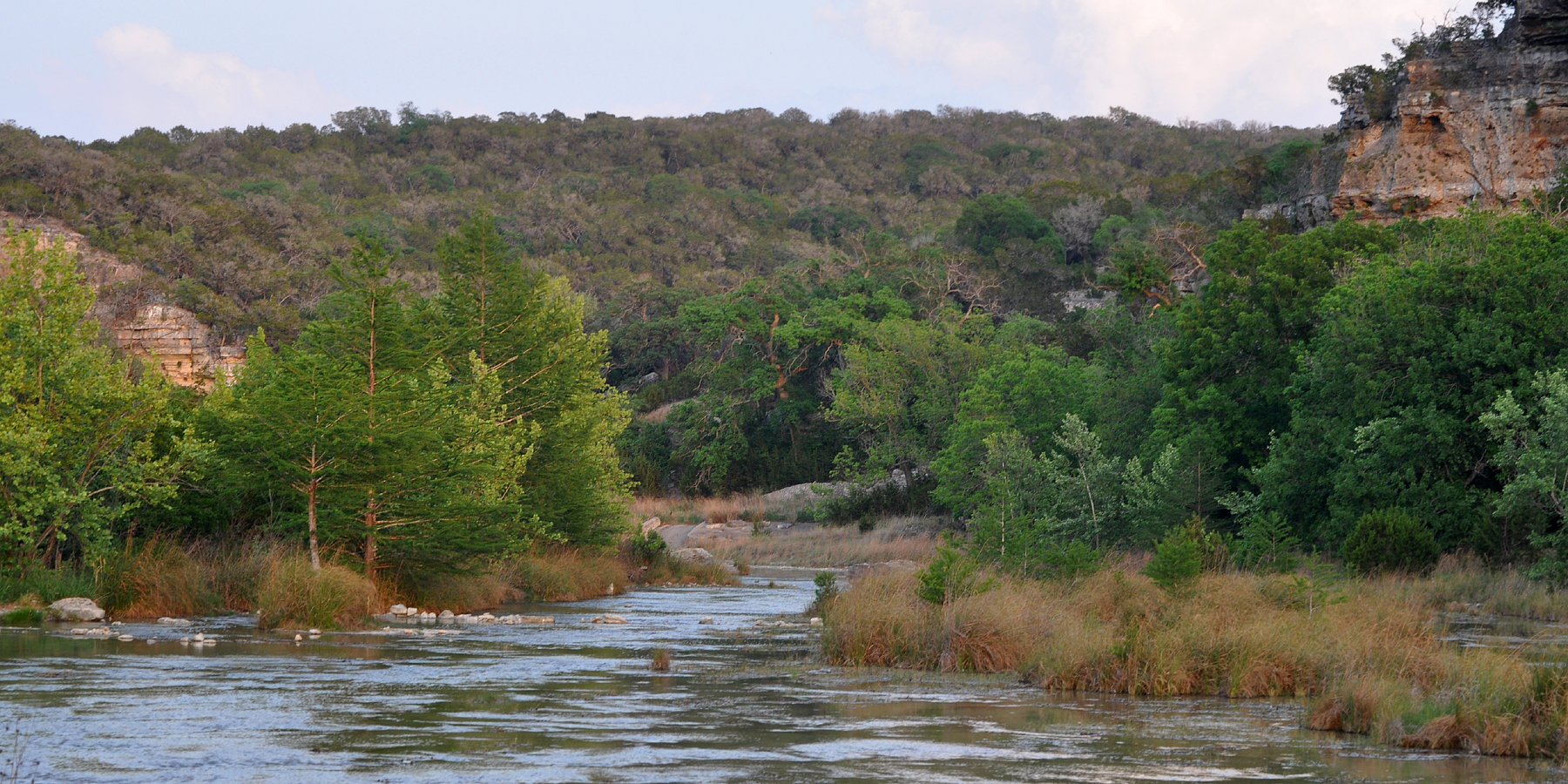
In Kerr County

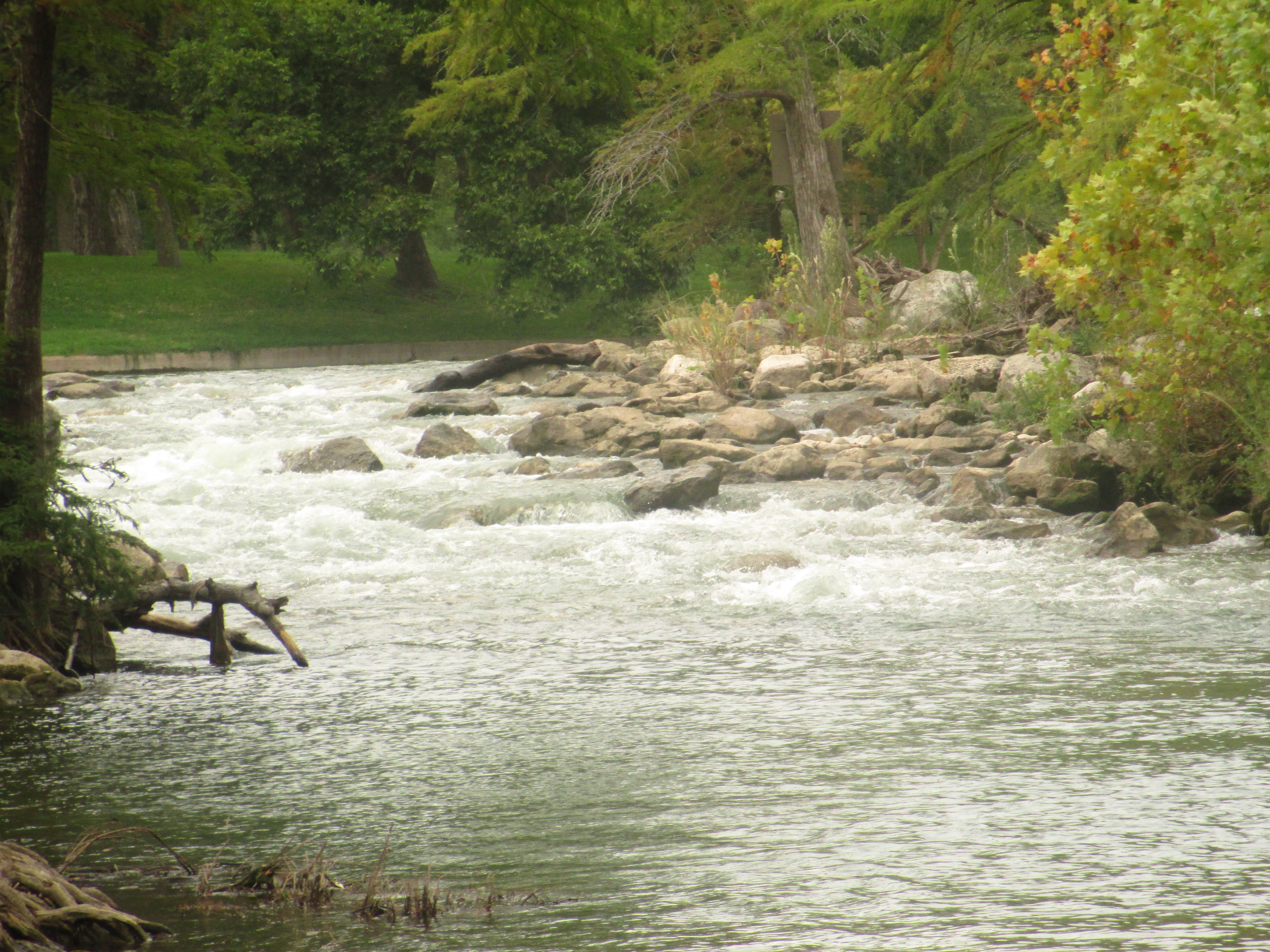
In Gruene

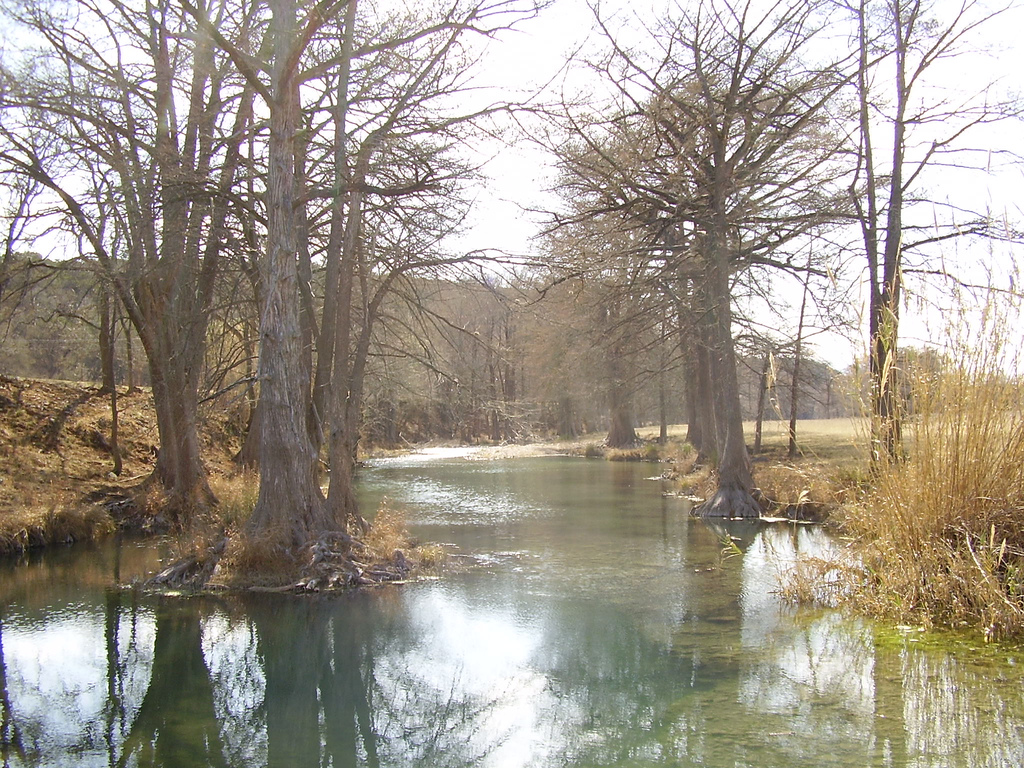
Near Hunt

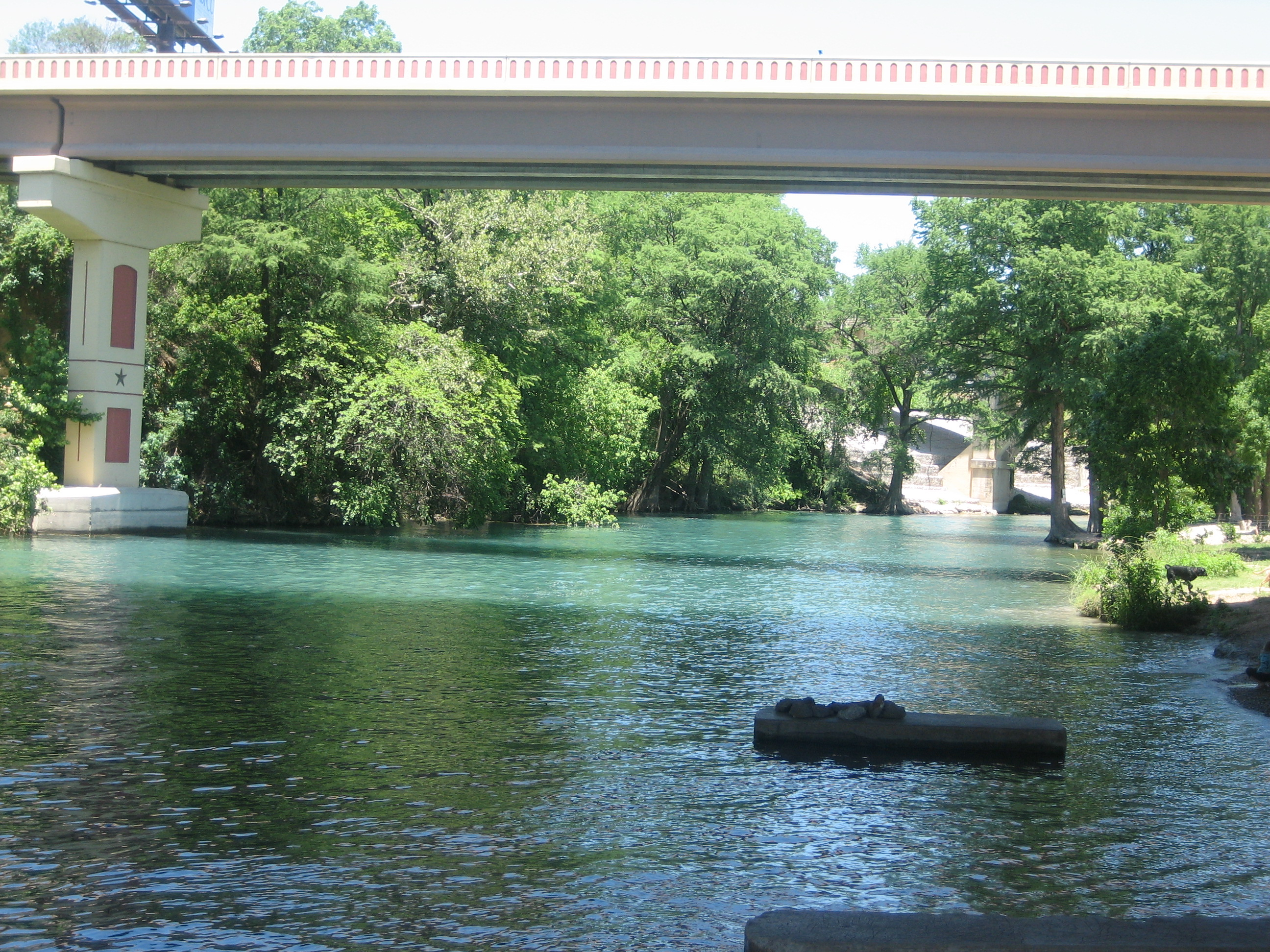
Under Interstate 35 in New Braunfels

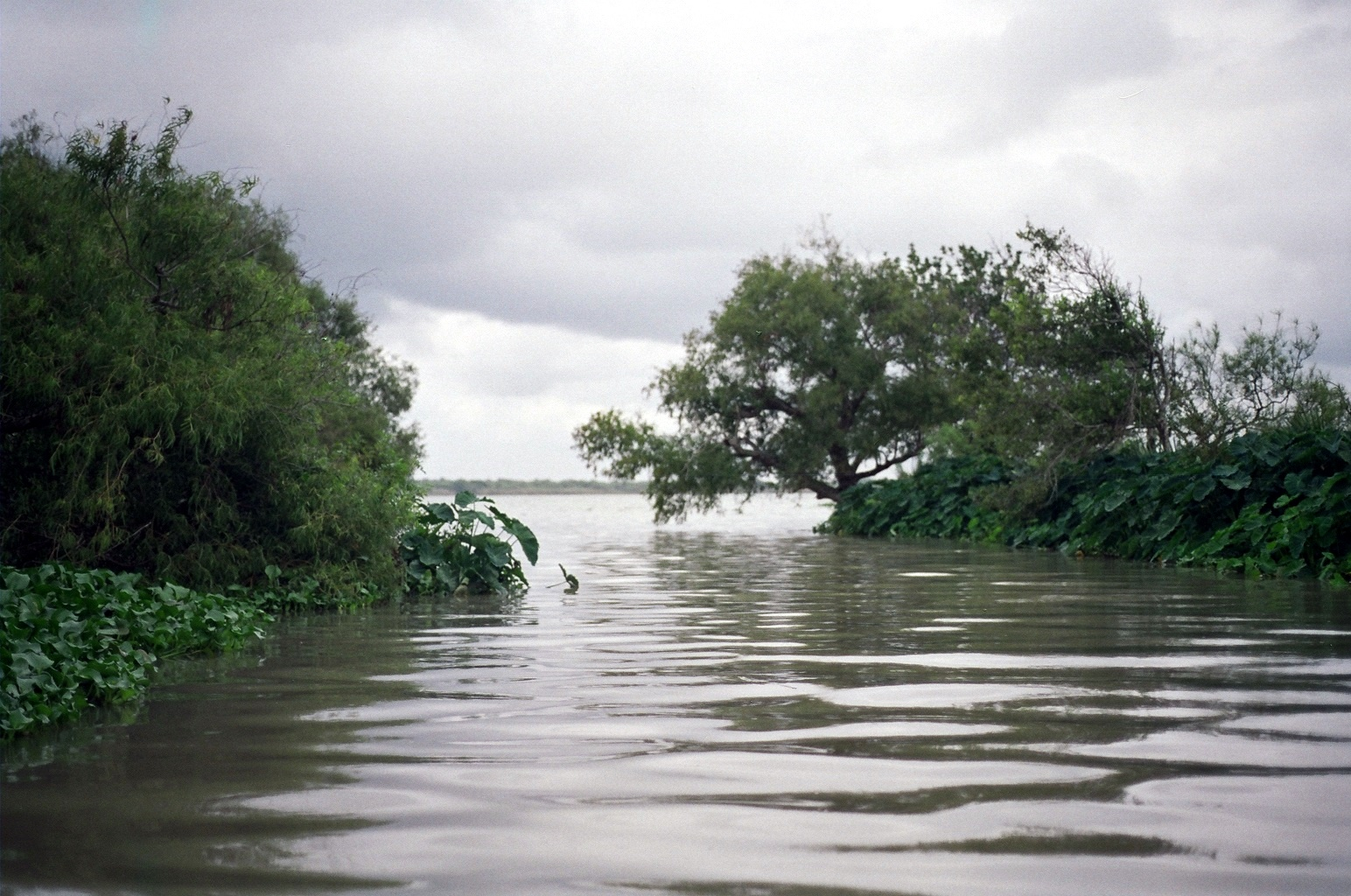
Mouth of the South Guadalupe River at Guadalupe Bay

== History ==
The river was named after Nuestra Señora de Guadalupe by Alonso de León in 1689. It was renamed the San Augustin by Domingo Terán de los Ríos who maintained a colony on it, but the name Guadalupe persisted. Many explorers referred to the current Guadalupe as the San Ybón above its confluence with the Comal, and instead the Comal was called the Guadalupe. Evidence indicates that it has been home to humans for several thousand years, including the Karankawa, Tonkawa, and Huaco (pronounced like Waco) Indians.

Being led by Prince Solms, 228 pioneer immigrants from Germany traveled overland from Indianola to the site chosen to be the first German settlement in Texas, New Braunfels. Upon reaching the river, the pioneers found it too high to cross due to the winter rains. Prince Solms, perhaps wishing to impress the others with his bravado, plunged into the raging waters and crossed the swollen river on horseback. Not to be outdone by anyone, Betty Holekamp immediately followed and successfully crossed the river.

== Flash floods ==
The river is prone to flash floods due to a combination of topography, geology, and climate. The greater area, Texas Hill Country, is known as flash flood alley. According to the Washington Post, it "is the most flash-flood prone region in the country".

=== 1978 ===
In July 1978, Tropical Storm Amelia made landfall and moved inland, stalling over the headwaters of the Medina and Guadalupe rivers. 33 people drowned in the flooding.

=== 1987 ===
On July 17, 1987, a sudden flash flood swept a bus full of children away at a low water crossing. The incident occurred near the town of Comfort, Texas, which lies about 50 miles (80 km) northwest of San Antonio. At the time, the Pot O' Gold Ranch, which is situated on the south side of the river about two miles (3.2 km) southwest of Comfort, was hosting a church camp, with over 300 children from various churches attending. On the night of July 16 and into the morning of the 17th, almost 12 inches (300 mm) of rain had fallen across the Texas hill country to the north, triggering immense flooding on the Guadalupe River. The camp was scheduled to end on the 17th and the children were going home later that day, but camp supervisors at the ranch decided to evacuate the children early that morning before it rose too high. At around 9 am that morning, the children were loaded into buses and the buses were directed to a low water crossing.

While most of the buses managed to make it across, one bus from the Seagoville Road Baptist Church/Balch Springs Christian Academy in the Dallas suburb of Balch Springs was swept away, along with Pastor Richard Koons, his wife Lavonda, chaperons Allen and Deborah Coalson, and thirty-nine children, ranging in age from 8 to 17. The vehicle had been among the last to leave the camp and proceed alongside the flooded crossing, but when the bus stalled due to rapidly rising waters, Koons and Coalson attempted to get the children to safety by instructing them to form a human chain so that they could reach shore hand in hand. As this was attempted, a sudden rush of water broke the chain and swept them all away. Rescuers from the Texas Department of Public Safety and the US Army's 507th Medical Division managed to save all four adults and 29 of the children via helicopters. The last survivor was rescued from the river around 11:30 am, and by that afternoon two children had been confirmed dead, with eight still missing. The first confirmed fatality was 14-year-old Melanie Finley, who after being lifted from the river by helicopter lost her grip on the rope and fell to her death. The second fatality was 13-year-old Tonya Smith, who was found entangled in barbed wire two miles downstream from where the bus was washed away. Several parents of the children descended on Comfort, most staying at a makeshift shelter set up by town residents and the American Red Cross at the Comfort Elementary School. Six more bodies were recovered from the river on July 18, identified as Lagenia Keenum, 15; Michael Lane, 16; Michael O'Neal, 16; Cindy Sewell, 16; Christopher Sewell, 13; and Stacey Smith, 16 (sister of Tonya Smith). The following day, the ninth and final body was recovered from the river, identified as 14-year-old Leslie Gossett. The body of 17-year-old John Bankston Jr., the oldest of the 10 victims, was never found.

In the summer of 1988, near the edge of the river and at the foot of the driveway to the Pot O' Gold Ranch, a memorial plaque was dedicated to the children who died as well as those who survived. On April 18, 1989, the story of the deaths and rescues was shown as the pilot episode of Rescue 911, and in 1993 was made into a television movie called The Flood: Who Will Save Our Children? The film followed the experiences of some of the children and their families, and starred Joe Spano as Reverend Richard Koons.

=== 2002 ===
The river flooded in 2002 after the area received over 19 inches (480 mm) of rain.

=== 2025 ===
On July 4, 2025, destructive and deadly flooding took place in the Hill Country region of the U.S. state of Texas. During the flooding, water levels along the Guadalupe River rose rapidly. As a result, 136 people were killed and 3 remain missing, with 117 of deaths occurring in Kerr County. The flooding was caused by a mesoscale convective vortex with enhanced tropical moisture.

Flooding began on the morning of July 4, after significant rainfall accumulated across Central Texas. Six flash flood emergencies, which included the cities of Kerrville and Mason, were issued the same day. The Guadalupe River rose about 26 ft (8 m) in 45 minutes, surging an estimated 29 ft (8.8 m) in the Hunt area, where more than 20 children were declared missing from a summer camp. July 5 saw more flash flood warnings for the Burnet County, Texas, area, Williamson County, Texas, area, Travis County, Texas, area including Lake Travis, which is part of the Colorado River watershed, and the lower San Gabriel River (Texas). The worst affected area in NW Travis County was the Sandy Creek neighborhood, which saw devastating damage in the wake of the floods. A total of 9 people died in Travis County, 3 in Williamson County, and 5 in Burnet County. In the span of a few hours, the equivalent of four months worth of rain fell across the Texas Hill Country region, with the highest rain totals being 20.33 in (516 mm). The flood was the deadliest inland flooding event in the United States since the 1976 Big Thompson River flood, surpassing flooding from Hurricane Helene in 2024.

On July 12, the Weather Prediction Center declared a moderate risk for the same area in Central Texas, with the potential for significant to major flash flooding. Throughout the overnight hours of July 12 into the next day, several flash flood warnings were issued, including a flash flood emergency for San Saba County. The resulting additional rainfall caused the Lampasas River to rise over 30 ft (9.1 m).

After the disaster, Texas governor Greg Abbott signed a disaster declaration for several counties in Central Texas, and U.S. president Donald Trump signed a federal disaster declaration for Kerr County. Over 2,000 volunteers arrived in Kerr County to help with the search and rescue. Numerous firefighter and search and rescue teams from around the U.S. scoured the Guadalupe River for survivors and victims. Various organizations responded to the area with food, equipment and manpower.

Kerr County did not have a dedicated flood warning system, despite prior proposals from local officials citing the area's high flood risk. For National Flood Insurance Program purposes administered by the Federal Emergency Management Agency (FEMA), the floodplain or special flood hazard area is defined as the area that would be flooded by a base flood which "has a one percent chance of being equaled or exceeded in any given year", also known as a 100-year flood. The 2011 Kerr County flood insurance rate map showed Camp Mystic, a Christian girls' summer camp, as being in a special flood hazard area. Following various appeals from the camp, several buildings were removed from the hazard area, as the camp continued to operate and expanded in and around the flood plain.

== River conditions ==
The river's conditions can change rapidly. Its flow is set by the dam at Canyon Lake operated by the Army Corps of Engineers. It is highly regulated and well maintained to ensure safety. It is, however, prone to severe flooding. During the rainy seasons the water can reach well above the banks and exceed "normal" levels, in which case it can become life threateningly dangerous due to swift currents. If the flow gauge exceeds 1,000 cubic feet per second (28 m^{3}/s) at the Sattler Gage, it is generally considered by local authorities as too dangerous for recreational purposes for all except expert kayakers and/or whitewater rafters. On October 31, 2013, the river in New Braunfels rose from 74 to 33,500 cubic feet per second (2 to 949 m^{3}/s) in one hour and 15 minutes due to locally heavy rainfall.

== Uses ==
Fly fishing for rainbow, and brown trout below Canyon Lake is extremely popular along the entire river, anglers can catch guadalupe bass, largemouth bass, smallmouth bass, rio grande cichlid, striped bass and white bass. Tailrace fishing is also common below many of the weirs, spillways and dams such as West-point Pepperell Dam located on the north end of Lake Dunlap within the City Limits of New Braunfels.

The Mandaean-American community of San Antonio regularly performs masbuta (baptism) rituals in the Guadalupe River.

== Points of interest ==
- Riverside Nature Center, Kerrville, Texas

== See also ==
- Guadalupe-Blanco River Authority
- List of rivers of Texas
