= National Register of Historic Places listings in Menard County, Texas =

Location of Menard County in Texas

This is a list of the National Register of Historic Places listings in Menard County, Texas.

This is intended to be a complete list of properties and districts listed on the National Register of Historic Places in Menard County, Texas. There is one district and two individual properties listed on the National Register in the county. The district is a Texas State Historic Site and includes a Recorded Texas Historic Landmark. Both individual properties are State Antiquities Landmarks while one is also a Recorded Texas Historic Landmark.

This National Park Service list is complete through NPS recent listings posted January 2, 2026.

== Current listings ==
The locations of National Register properties and districts may be seen in a mapping service provided.

	Name on the Register	Image	Date listed	Location	City or town	Description
1	Fort McKavett Historic District	Fort McKavett Historic District	July 14, 1971 (#71000955)	S bank of the San Saba River; 30°49′43″N 100°06′27″W	Fort McKavett	Texas State Historic Site, includes Recorded Texas Historic Landmark
2	Menard County Courthouse	Menard County Courthouse	September 12, 2003 (#03000935)	206 E. San Saba St. 30°54′55″N 99°47′02″W	Menard	State Antiquities Landmark, Recorded Texas Historic Landmark
3	Site of Presidio San Luis de las Amarillas	Site of Presidio San Luis de las Amarillas	August 25, 1972 (#72001369)	1 mile west of Menard; 30°55′21″N 99°48′06″W	Menard	State Antiquities Landmark

== See also ==
- National Register of Historic Places listings in Texas
- List of Texas State Historic Sites
- Recorded Texas Historic Landmarks in Menard County
