= Menard High School (Texas) =

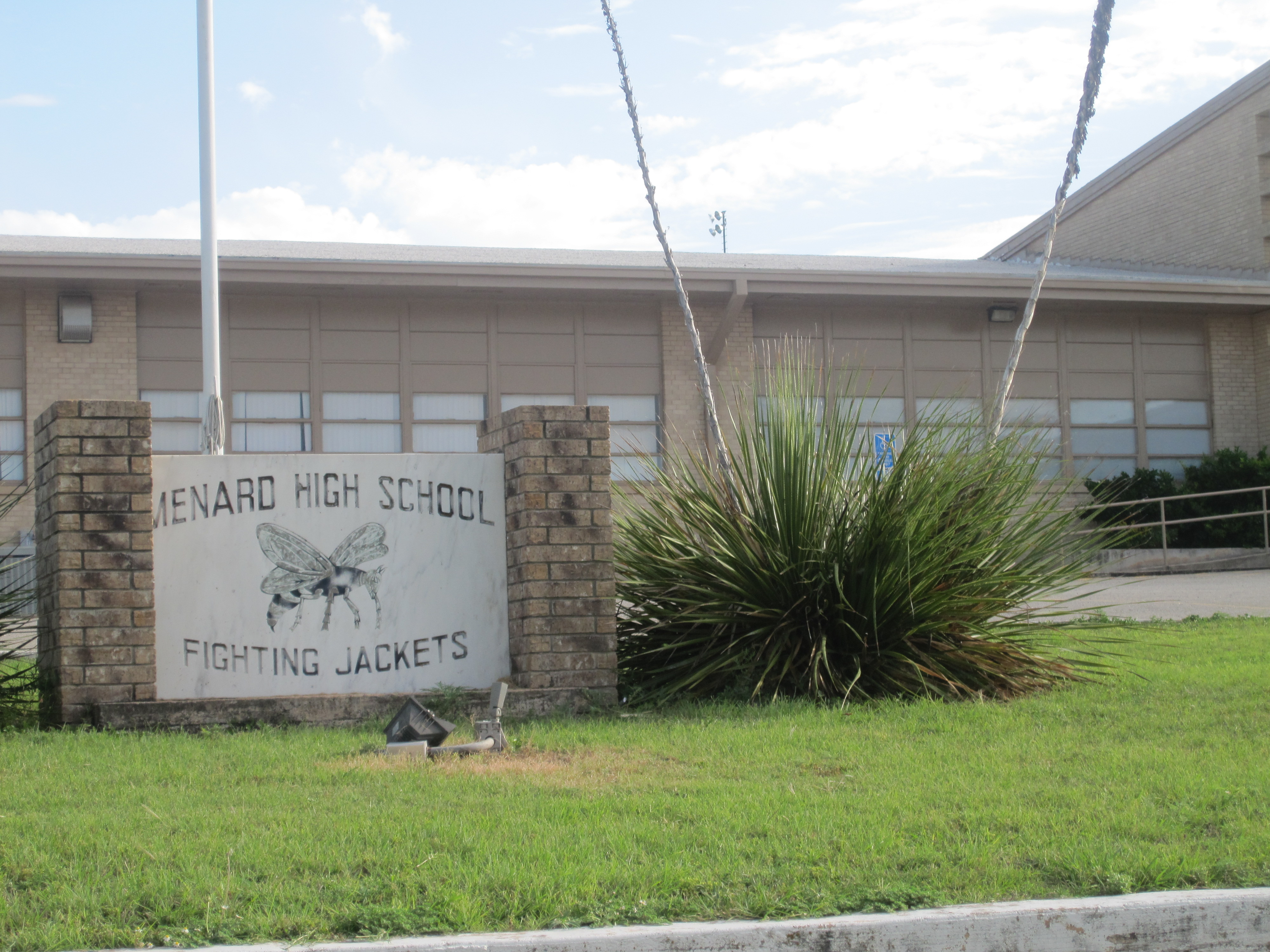

Location
- 401 West Travis St. Menard, Texas 76859-0729; United States; 30.91311°N 99.79039°W

Information
- School type: Public High School
- School district: Menard Independent School District
- Principal: Jacob Hand
- Teaching staff: 10.03 (FTE)
- Grades: 9-12
- Enrollment: 92 (2023-2024)
- Student to teacher ratio: 9.17
- Colors: Black & Gold
- Athletics conference: UIL Class 1A
- Mascot: Yellow Jacket
- Website: Menard High School

Menard High School is a public high school located in Menard, Texas (USA) and classified as a 1A school by the UIL. It is part of the Menard Independent School District located in central Menard County. In 2015, the school was rated "Met Standard" by the Texas Education Agency.

== Athletics ==
The Menard Yellow Jackets compete in these sports -

Cross Country, Football, Basketball, Golf, Tennis, Track, Softball & Baseball

=== State Titles ===
- Boys Golf -
  - 1964(B)
- One Act Play -
  - 1961(1A), 1962(1A), 1963(1A), 1964(1A)
- Marching Band -
  - 2021(1A), 2023(1A)
