= National Register of Historic Places listings in Kerr County, Texas =

Location of Kerr County in Texas

This is a list of the National Register of Historic Places listings in Kerr County, Texas.

This is intended to be a complete list of properties listed on the National Register of Historic Places in Kerr County, Texas. There are six properties listed on the National Register in the county. Three of these are individually listed as Recorded Texas Historic Landmarks while two more include Recorded Texas Historic Landmarks within their sites.

This National Park Service list is complete through NPS recent listings posted March 21, 2025.

== Current listings ==
The locations of National Register properties may be seen in a mapping service provided.

	Name on the Register	Image	Date listed	Location	City or town	Description
1	Guthrie Building	Guthrie Building	June 8, 2011 (#11000345)	241 Earl Garrett St. 30°02′47″N 99°08′22″W	Kerrville	Recorded Texas Historic Landmark
2	Masonic Building	Masonic Building	January 12, 1984 (#84001903)	211 Earl Garrett St. 30°02′44″N 99°08′23″W	Kerrville	Recorded Texas Historic Landmark
3	Old Camp Verde	Old Camp Verde	May 25, 1973 (#73001968)	Camp Verde Rd. 29°53′25″N 99°07′13″W	Camp Verde	Includes Recorded Texas Historic Landmark
4	Capt. Charles Schreiner Mansion	Capt. Charles Schreiner Mansion	April 14, 1975 (#75001997)	216 Earl Garrett St. 30°02′46″N 99°08′23″W	Kerrville	Includes Recorded Texas Historic Landmarks
5	Tulahteka		August 11, 1982 (#82004510)	South of Kerrville on TX 16; 30°02′13″N 99°08′42″W	Kerrville	Also known as the Louis A. Schreiner Mansion
6	Woolls Building	Woolls Building	April 26, 2002 (#02000403)	318 San Antonio; 29°56′40″N 99°02′13″W	Center Point	Recorded Texas Historic Landmark

== See also ==
- National Register of Historic Places listings in Texas
- Recorded Texas Historic Landmarks in Kerr County
