= Callan, Texas =

Unincorporated community in Texas, US

Coordinates: 31°03′31″N 99°41′30″W

Callan is an unincorporated community in Menard County, Texas, United States.
