= Sunnyside, Menard County, Texas =

Ghost town in Texas, US

Sunnyside is a ghost town in Menard County, Texas, United States.

== See also ==
- List of ghost towns in Texas
