= Menard Independent School District =

School district in Texas

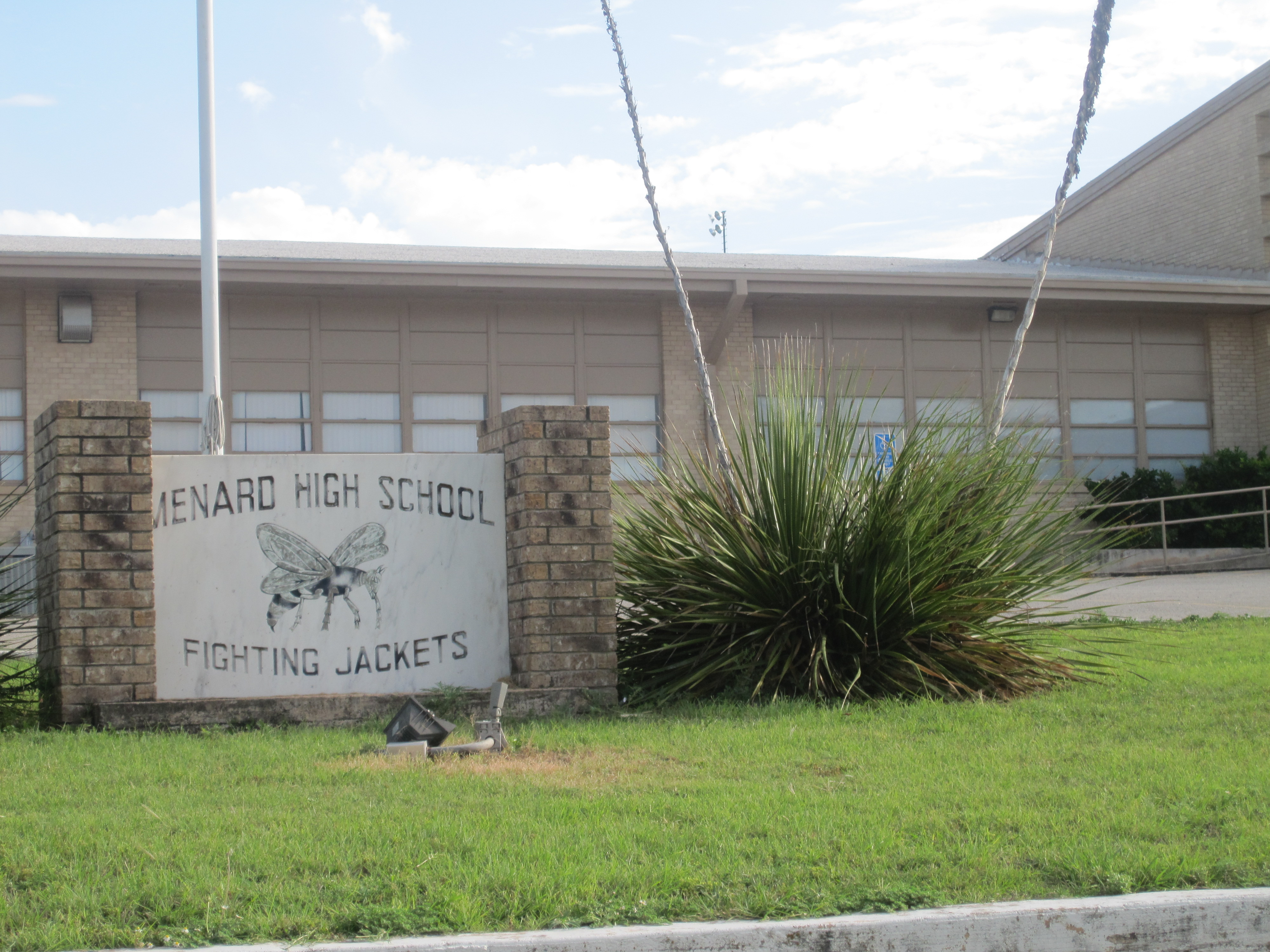
Menard High School in Menard, Texas

Menard Independent School District is a public school district based in Menard, Texas (USA) and serves students primarily from Menard County.

In 2009, the school district was rated "academically acceptable" by the Texas Education Agency.

== Schools ==
- Menard High School (Grades 9–12). Menard High School should not be confused with Holy Savior Menard Central High School in Alexandria, Louisiana.
- Menard Junior High (Grades 6–8)
- Menard Elementary (Grades PK-5)
