= Masonic Building (Kerrville, Texas) =

- U.S. National Register of Historic Places
- Recorded Texas Historic Landmark
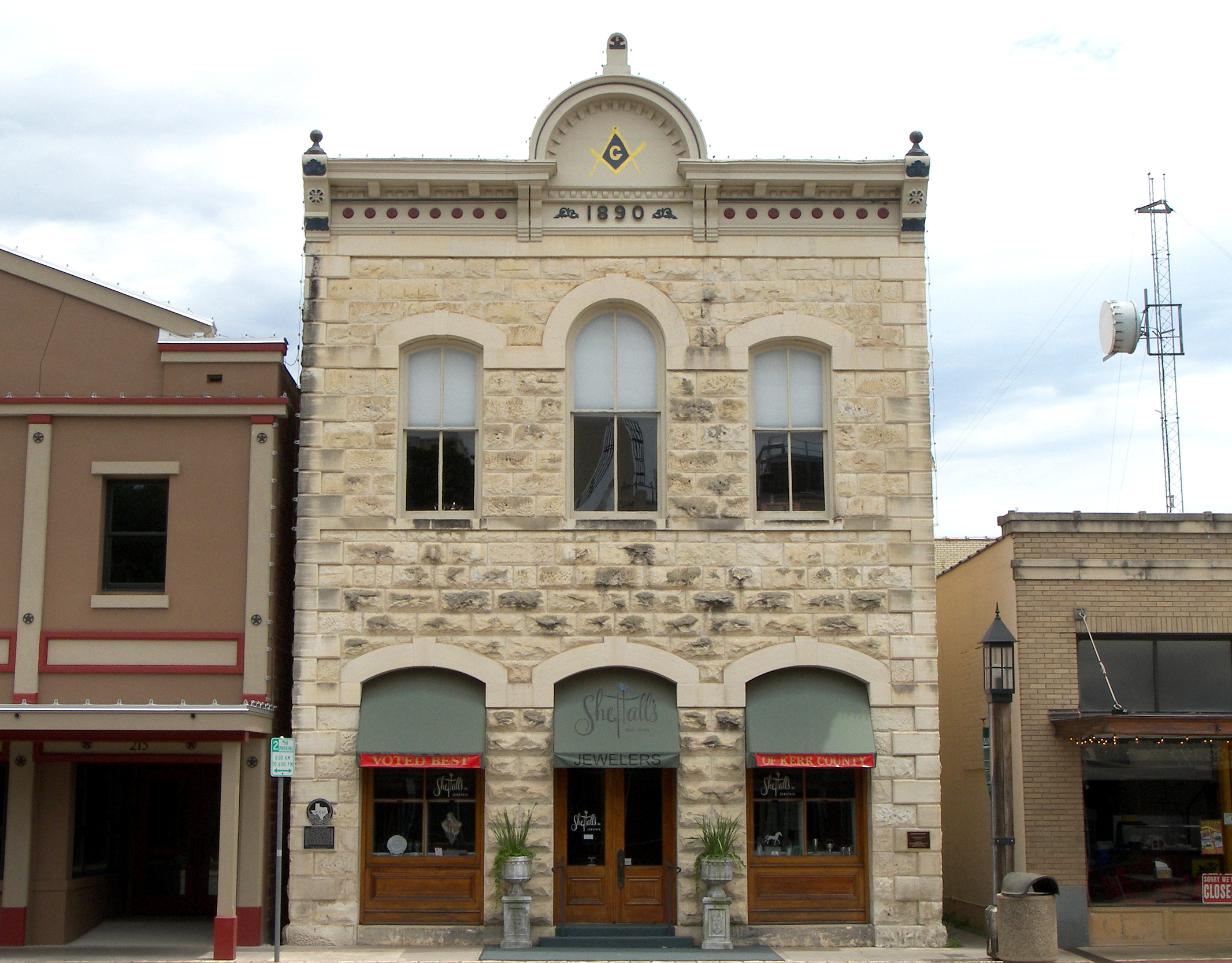
- The Kerrville Masonic Building in 2009.

- Location within Texas Location within the United States
- Location: 211 Earl Garrett St., Kerrville, Texas
- Coordinates: 30°2′44″N 99°8′23″W
- Area: less than one acre
- Built: 1890
- Architect: Alfred Giles
- Architectural style: Italianate
- NRHP reference No.: 84001903
- RTHL No.: 14261

Significant dates
- Added to NRHP: January 12, 1984
- Designated RTHL: 2008

The Masonic Building in Kerrville, Texas is an Italianate building built in 1890. Alfred Giles was the architect. Kerrville Masonic Lodge #697 made its home in the building until 1927. The first floor later housed a post office and grocery store. The building was listed on the National Register of Historic Places in 1984. It was restored during 1984-1985 using rare woods and including work by special craftsmen.

== See also ==
- National Register of Historic Places listings in Kerr County, Texas
- Recorded Texas Historic Landmarks in Kerr County
