= Saline, Texas =

Unincorporated community in Texas, US

Coordinates: 30°43′21″N 99°33′12″W

Saline is an unincorporated community in Menard County, Texas, United States. According to the Handbook of Texas, the community had an estimated population of 59 in 2000.
