= Erna, Texas =

Unincorporated community in Texas, US

Coordinates: 30°45′03″N 99°29′09″W

Erna is an unincorporated community in Menard County, Texas, United States.
