= Capt. Charles Schreiner Mansion =

Historic mansion in Kerrville, Texas, USA

- U.S. National Register of Historic Places
- Recorded Texas Historic Landmark
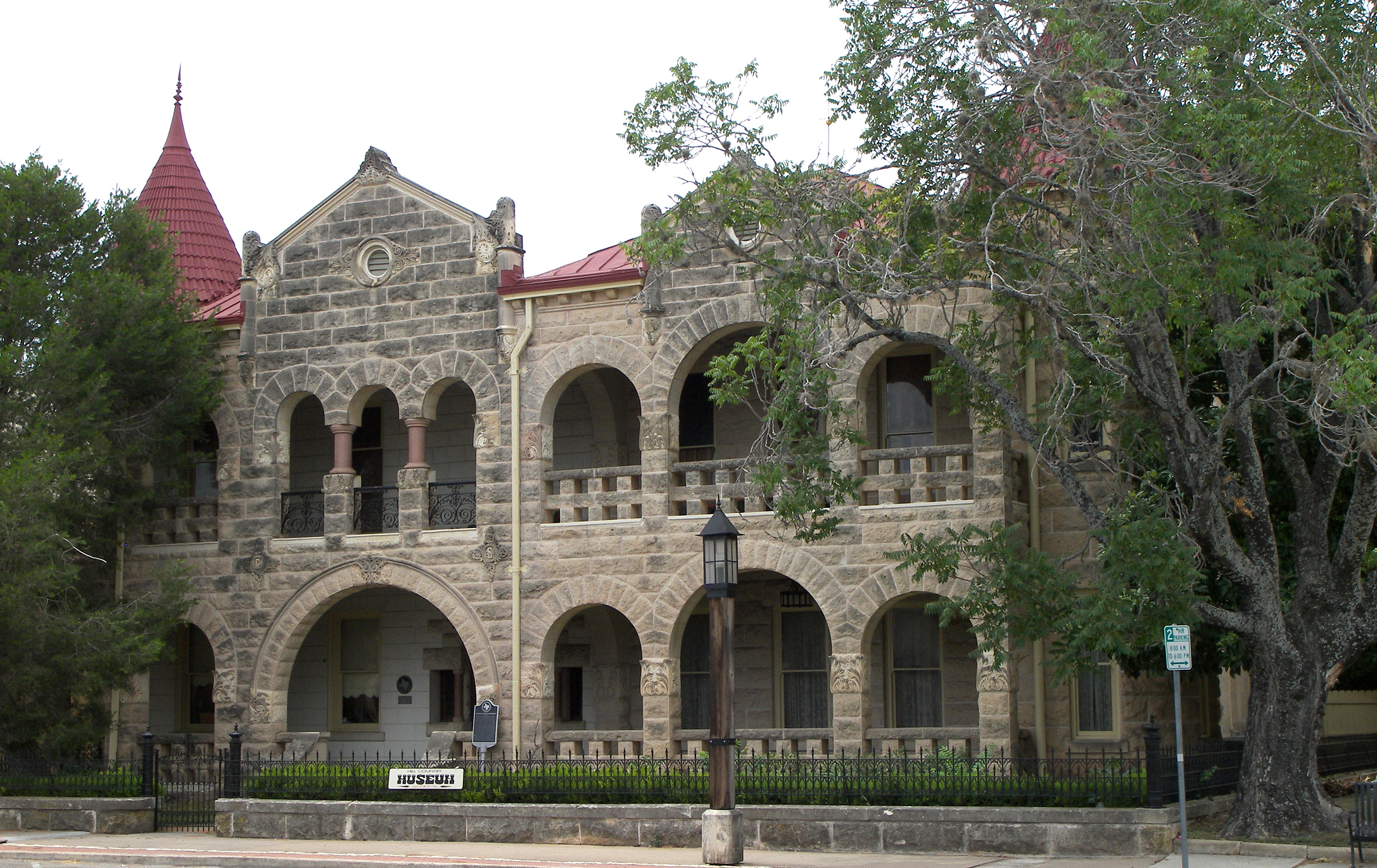
- Capt. Charles Schreiner Mansion in 2009

- Location within Texas Location within the United States
- Interactive map showing the location of Capt. Charles Schreiner Mansion
- Location: 216 Earl Garrett St., Kerrville, Texas
- Coordinates: 30°2′46″N 99°8′23″W
- Area: 0.5 acres (0.20 ha)
- Built: 1879
- Architect: Alfred Giles
- Architectural style: Renaissance, Romanesque
- NRHP reference No.: 75001997
- RTHL No.: 711

Significant dates
- Added to NRHP: April 14, 1975
- Designated RTHL: 1962

The Capt. Charles Schreiner Mansion is located in Kerrville in the U.S. state of Texas. It was added to the National Register of Historic Places listings in Kerr County, Texas in 1975. It was designated a Recorded Texas Historic Landmark in 1962. The mansion is currently the home of the Hill Country Museum. In 1984, Mrs. E. C. Parker was awarded a Jefferson Davis Certificate of Meritorious Service for Preservation and Restoration, in honor of her work in converting the mansion into a museum.

The mansion is now home to the Hill Country Museum, which is operated by Schreiner University.

== Design ==
Texas Ranger and Confederate States Army veteran Charles Schreiner, Sr., was descended from French nobility. His father Gustav had been born in a castle in Alsace. The Schreiner family moved to San Antonio in 1852. Schreiner became a wealthy rancher, merchant and philanthropist in Kerrville. Schreiner commissioned San Antonio architect Alfred Giles to design the mansion in 1879. The original six-bedroom, two-story house was the first limestone building in Kerr County. In 1895, Schreiner had Giles add a more elaborate porch. The combined styles of Romanesque Revival and Chateauesque were a result in part of the labor force being brought from Germany, and pink granite columns imported from Italy. In 1927, the Schreiner heirs transferred ownership of the mansion to the Kerrville Masonic Lodge, which sold it in 1972 to a private owner.

== See also ==
- National Register of Historic Places listings in Kerr County, Texas
- Recorded Texas Historic Landmarks in Kerr County
