= Fort McKavett State Historic Site =

- Fort McKavett Historic District
- U.S. National Register of Historic Places
- Recorded Texas Historic Landmark
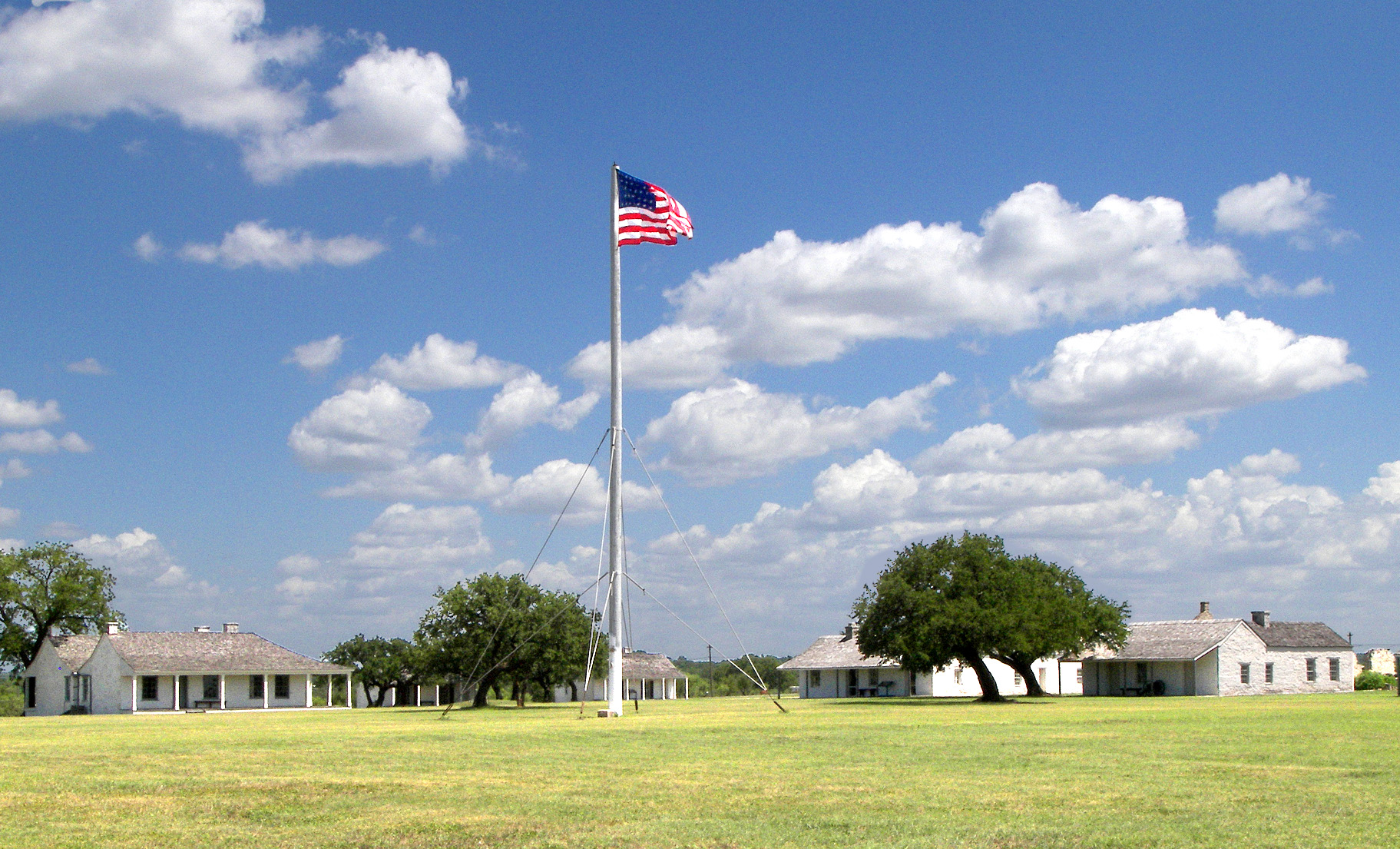
- The parade grounds of Fort McKavett State Historic Site and restored officers' quarters

- Location within Texas Location within the United States
- Location: Menard County, Texas
- Coordinates: 30°49′37″N 100°06′29″W
- Area: 82 acres (33 ha)
- NRHP reference No.: 71000955
- RTHL No.: 4642

Significant dates
- Added to NRHP: July 14, 1971
- Designated RTHL: 1936, 1963, 1968

The Fort McKavett State Historic Site is a former United States Army installation located in Menard County, Texas. The fort was first established in 1852 as part of a line of forts in Texas intended to protect migrants traveling to California. The fort was deemed unnecessary and abandoned in 1859 and was occupied by settlers. From 1861 to 1863, during the American Civil War, the fort became an outpost of Confederate forces on the Texas frontier until they left for other theaters of the war. When the US Army returned to Texas in the later 1860s, the fort was reoccupied and rebuilt, and was at times garrisoned by the "Buffalo Soldier", or all-African American, 24th Infantry and 9th Cavalry Regiments.

Fort McKavett was abandoned permanently in June 1883 and was once again occupied by civilian settlers who converted its buildings into residences and businesses. The town of Fort McKavett, Texas, grew within and beyond the fort's grounds until the late 1920s. Thereafter it began a long decline until it became a ghost town by the end of the 20th century. Preservation of the fort began in 1968 and on July 14, 1971, it was added to the National Register of Historic Places. Fort McKavett is managed by the state of Texas as a Recorded Texas Historic Landmark.

== Use as military outpost ==
Fort McKavett was established during the American colonization of Texas, a process that began in the 1820s with the immigration of Anglo-Americans into Spanish, later Mexican, Texas. Europeans first reached the San Saba River valley, in central Texas, in the 17th century, when the Spanish Empire established contact with the Jumano people. In the mid-18th century, the Apache peoples migrated into central Texas, displacing the Jumano and then themselves being displaced by the Comanche people. From 1757 to 1768, the Spanish briefly maintained the Presidio San Luis de las Amarillas in the San Saba valley, but with the closure of the presidio abandoned the area. In 1849, the valley regained strategic significance when Captain William H.C. Whiting scouted a trail through central Texas that traveled through the valleys of the San Saba and Concho Rivers.

After existing as an independent republic for a decade, Texas was annexed by the United States of America in 1845, which led to the start of the Mexican-American War the next year. The United States defeated Mexico, and in the treaty that ended the war in 1848 annexed what is presently the Southwestern United States. That same year, gold was discovered in California, enticing an unprecedented number of white migrants to go west, across Texas, beginning in 1849. To protect them, the US Army established a line of forts in Texas 800 miles (1,300 km) long from Fort Worth to Fort Duncan in 1848–49. In 1851, Colonel Persifor Frazer Smith, commander of the Department of Texas, inspected those posts and ordered that a second line of forts be established farther west. The forts of that line – Belknap, Chadbourne, Clark, Mason, McKavett, Phantom Hill, and Terrett – were established between June 24, 1851, and November 18, 1852, along the trails through Texas.

=== First occupation by the US Army, 1852–59 ===
On November 16, 1851, General Smith ordered the 8th Infantry Regiment to establish a post on the San Saba, near the San Antonio–El Paso Road. The unit arrived on March 14, 1852, and encamped next to a pond until it grew stagnant in May. The camp was then moved 2 miles (3.2 km) downriver, onto a high bluff on the south bank of the river, two miles from its source. As the camp was 50 miles (80 km) west of Fort Mason, it was first known as the "Camp near Fort Mason", then as "Camp San Saba". In October 1852, the camp was named Camp McKavett, after an officer of the 8th Infantry who had died in the Battle of Monterrey in 1846, and retained that name when the post was designated a fort in 1853. In 1855, the US Army signed a 20-year lease of the land the fort occupied – at that time 640 acres (260 ha) – for $600 ($22,327, adjusted for inflation) a year from M. A. Dooley. (Note: Historian Colonel M. L. Crimmins states that several persons claimed ownership of the land but the government paid a man named Robinson for the lease.)

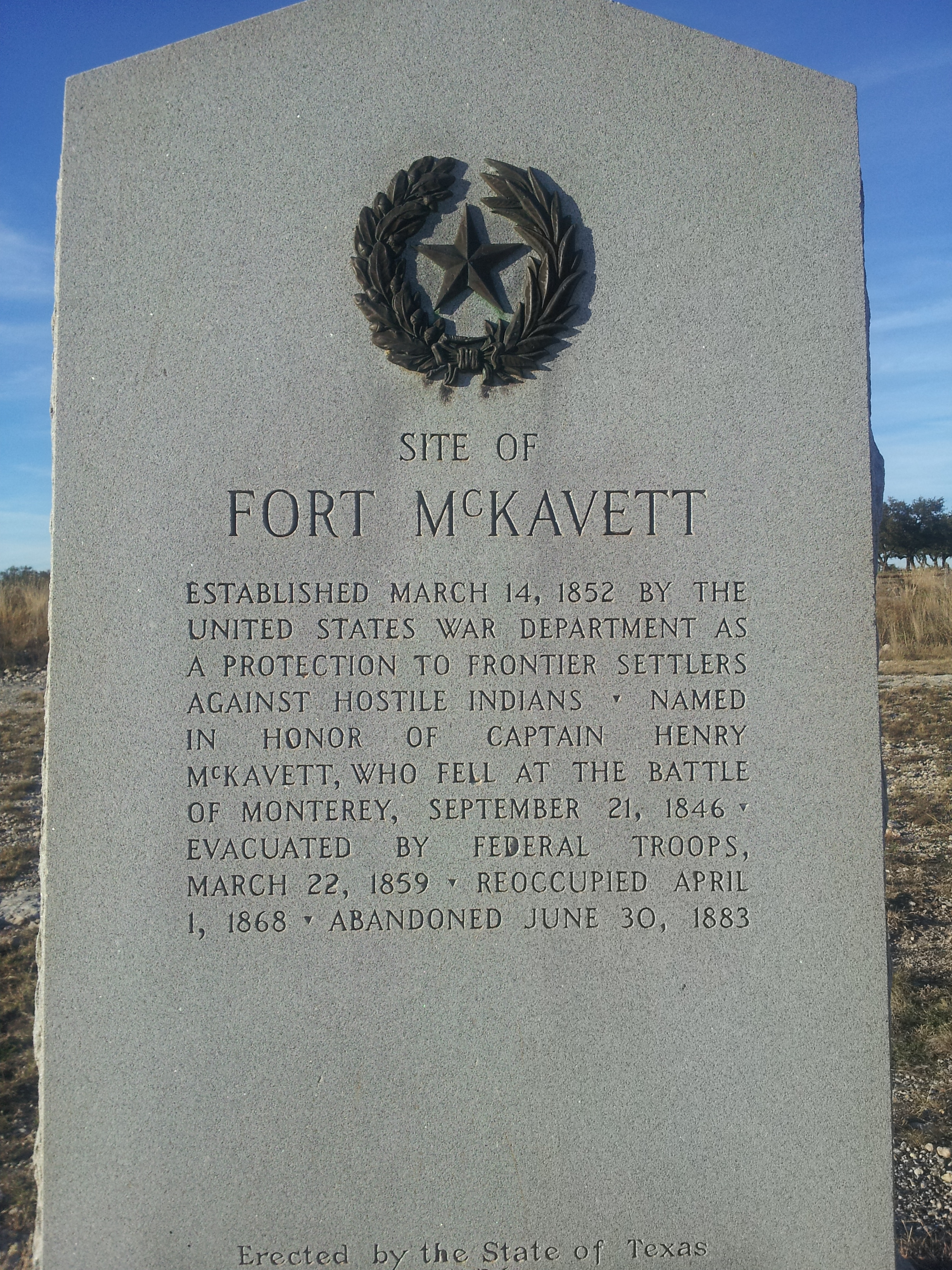
Stone marker placed by the State of Texas on the grounds of the fort

Construction of the post began after the lease was signed and saw rapid progress, as though there were no local civilian professionals to assist construction, there was a local abundance of usable stone and timber. By the end of the fort's first year of operation, it had five barracks, a hospital, and several kitchens that doubled as temporary officer's housing. Most of these buildings were wood and earth constructions, but by 1856, the fort had 21 stone buildings. The materials used for the construction, reconstruction, and expansion of the fort during its military operation were mostly sourced locally. Limestone was quarried from at least three sites in the vicinity of the fort. For its first year of existence, none of the completed buildings at the fort had any floors, doors, or glass windows, and materials for these things had to be brought from Fredericksburg, 100 miles (160 km) away.

The 8th Infantry was replaced at Fort McKavett on January 26, 1854, by the 2nd Dragoons Regiment. On August 15, 1855, the 2nd Dragoons were themselves replaced at McKavett by the 1st Infantry Regiment, and then on March 22, 1859, the US Army ordered the fort to be abandoned. Fort McKavett was at that time in a remote location, which complicated supply and communications, despite its being connected by road to San Antonio by April 1853. In addition, the garrisons of Fort McKavett and of the Texas forts generally, composed mostly of infantry, had been unable to arrest the raiding of the horse-riding indigenous peoples.

=== Use by Confederate Texas, 1861–65 ===
Over the first two months of 1861, Texas decided to secede from the United States, and on 4 February demanded the surrender of all Federal garrisons and property in Texas. Brevet Major General David E. Twiggs, commander of the Department of Texas since 1857, complied on February 18, 1861, with an order for all Federal troops in Texas to evacuate the state. In March 1861, the Confederate government placed the defense of Texas's frontier upon career soldier Benjamin McCulloch, who passed the task onto his brother, Henry. The latter assembled a force of ten companies and garrisoned them in the abandoned US Army forts, establishing a line 400 miles (640 km) long. After a relative calm on the frontier from 1861, Confederate forces were unable to defend the Texas frontier and throughout the American Civil War white settlement receded to the east. In November 1863, all Confederate troops on the frontier were sent east to fight the United States, which left civilian militias as the only defense for Texan settlements.

=== Second occupation by the US Army, 1868–83 ===
Following the surrender of Confederate Texas on June 2, 1865, and the return of the US Army to Texas on June 19, 1865, frontier settlers made numerous petitions for protection from the US Army. These requests went unanswered until November 1866, when Federal forces began returning to the frontier. In December 1866, the 4th Cavalry Regiment, which arrived in Texas the previous August, was ordered to occupy the pre-war Forts Clark, Inge, Mason, and McKavett, and Camp Verde.

On April 1, 1868, the 4th Cavalry's A Company, led by Brevet Lieutenant Colonel Eugene B. Beaumont, arrived at Fort McKavett. They were joined later in the month by Company F of the 4th Cavalry and Companies D, E, and I of the 38th Infantry Regiment. With the exception of the original commanding officer's residence, every building on Fort McKavett's grounds had by April 1868 been reduced to ruins, obliging its new garrison to live out of tents and temporary wooden structures. On March 15, 1869, Brevet Major General Ranald S. Mackenzie arrived at Fort McKavett with F and M Companies of the 9th Cavalry Regiment, which replaced the 4th Cavalry companies. The 9th Cavalry and 38th Infantry, which became the 24th Infantry Regiment when it merged with the 41st Infantry Regiment on November 1, 1869, were two of the six (later four) post-war all-black "Buffalo Soldier" regiments of the US Army. The 41st Infantry was replaced at Fort McKavett by the 29th Infantry Regiment in 1870. The following year, they were relieved by the 24th Infantry Regiment, which remained at Fort McKavett until being replaced by the 10th Infantry Regiment in 1873. They were relieved by 22nd Infantry Regiment in 1879. From 1869 to 1871, the garrison rebuilt Fort McKavett's permanent structures and began regular patrols to locate and/or pursue raiding indigenous peoples, but rarely encountered any belligerents.

In October 1870, Mackenzie departed Fort McKavett for an assignment in Washington, D.C., leaving Lieutenant Colonel William Rufus Shafter in command of the fort. Mackenzie would not return to Fort McKavett, as on February 25, 1871, he was assigned to command the 4th Cavalry. In May 1871, William Tecumseh Sherman, Commanding General of the United States Army from 1869, inspected the Texas frontier and its garrisons, including Fort McKavett. Near the end of that tour, Sherman narrowly missed being killed by a party of Kiowa and subsequently issued orders for more aggressive measures against the Plains Nations. Mackenzie immediately began campaigns to drive the South Plains Nations from the Texas Panhandle and Llano Estacado, for which he summoned troops from the frontier forts. By mid-1875, the Comanche, Kiowa, and southern Cheyenne peoples, who had been defeated in the Red River War of 1874–75, were moved fully onto reservations. Fort McKavett's garrison participated in the conflict and subsequent expeditions to keep the Panhandle open to white settlement, but by 1878, with the defeat of the Lipan Apache people of far-west Texas, the fort lost its strategic importance, and the 10th Cavalry were withdrawn from the fort. In 1880, the US Army once more decided to close Fort McKavett, and on June 30, 1883, it was closed and abandoned by the 16th Infantry Regiment, who had arrived at the fort in 1881.

== Relationship with Fort McKavett, Texas ==
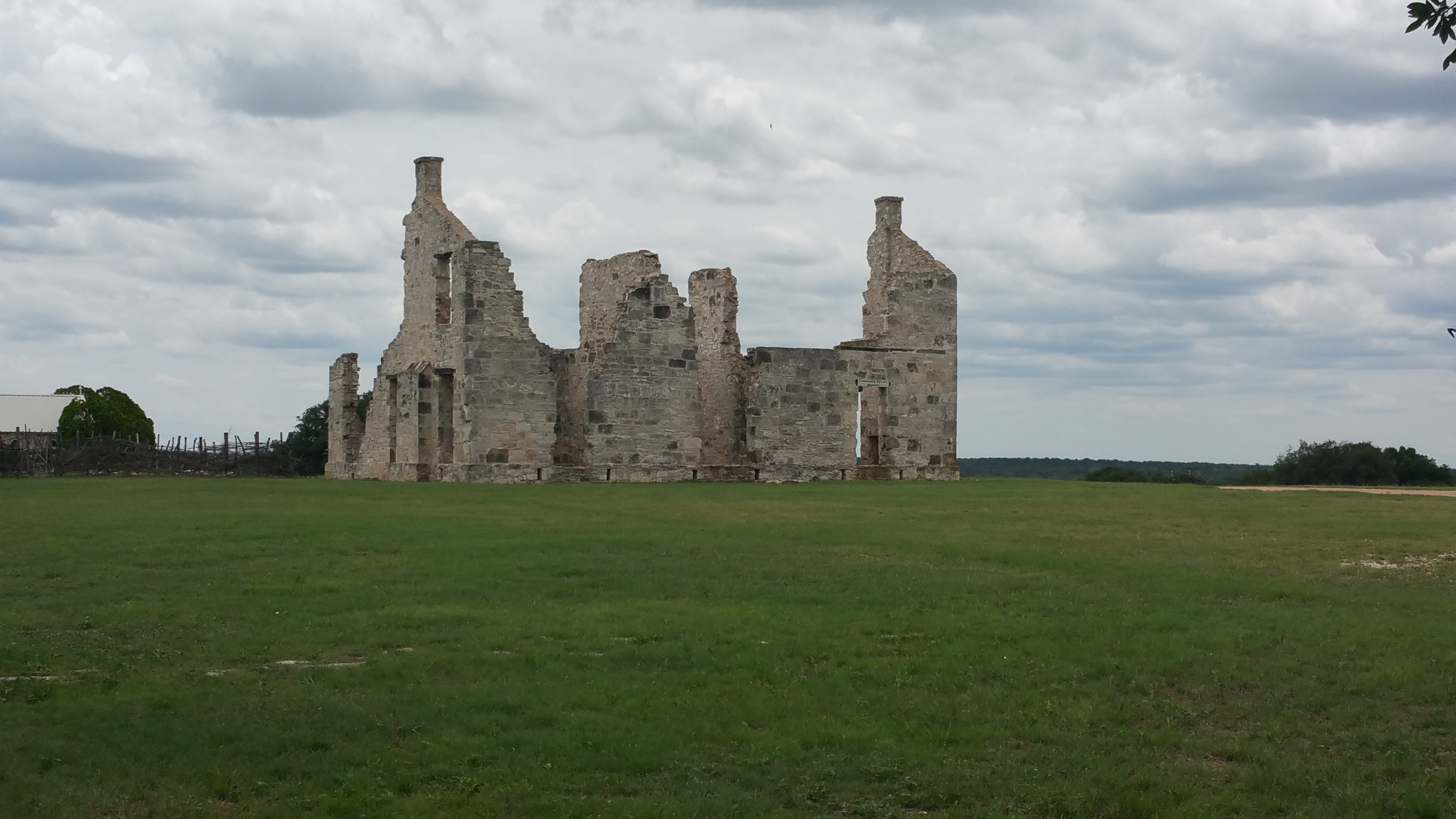
Ruins of the commanding officer's residence

Shortly after the establishment of Fort McKavett in the 1850s, a town was established 1 mile (1.6 km) to its north. Its name was to be Lehnesburg, after a German merchant, but came to be known as Scabtown. When the fort was abandoned in 1859, most of Scabtown's residents left and those that remained, such as the Robinson family, who owned the land the fort stood on, moved into the fort's buildings. The return of the US Army to Fort McKavett also meant the return of Scabtown, which was reestablished across the river from the fort as a collection of saloons and brothels catering to the fort's garrison. That garrison, composed mostly of African American soldiers, faced sometimes violent discrimination from local whites, whom the soldiers were charged with policing during Reconstruction.

When Fort McKavett was permanently closed in 1883, it was once again occupied by civilians. The fort's buildings were converted into residences and businesses, which found stability by catering to the needs of local cattle and sheep ranchers, and the civilian populace abandoned the name Scabtown for that of the fort. Fort McKavett, Texas, began a slow growth until it reached a peak of 150 residents in the late 1920s. Thereafter it began to decline until 2000, when only 15 people resided in Fort McKavett.

== Preservation ==
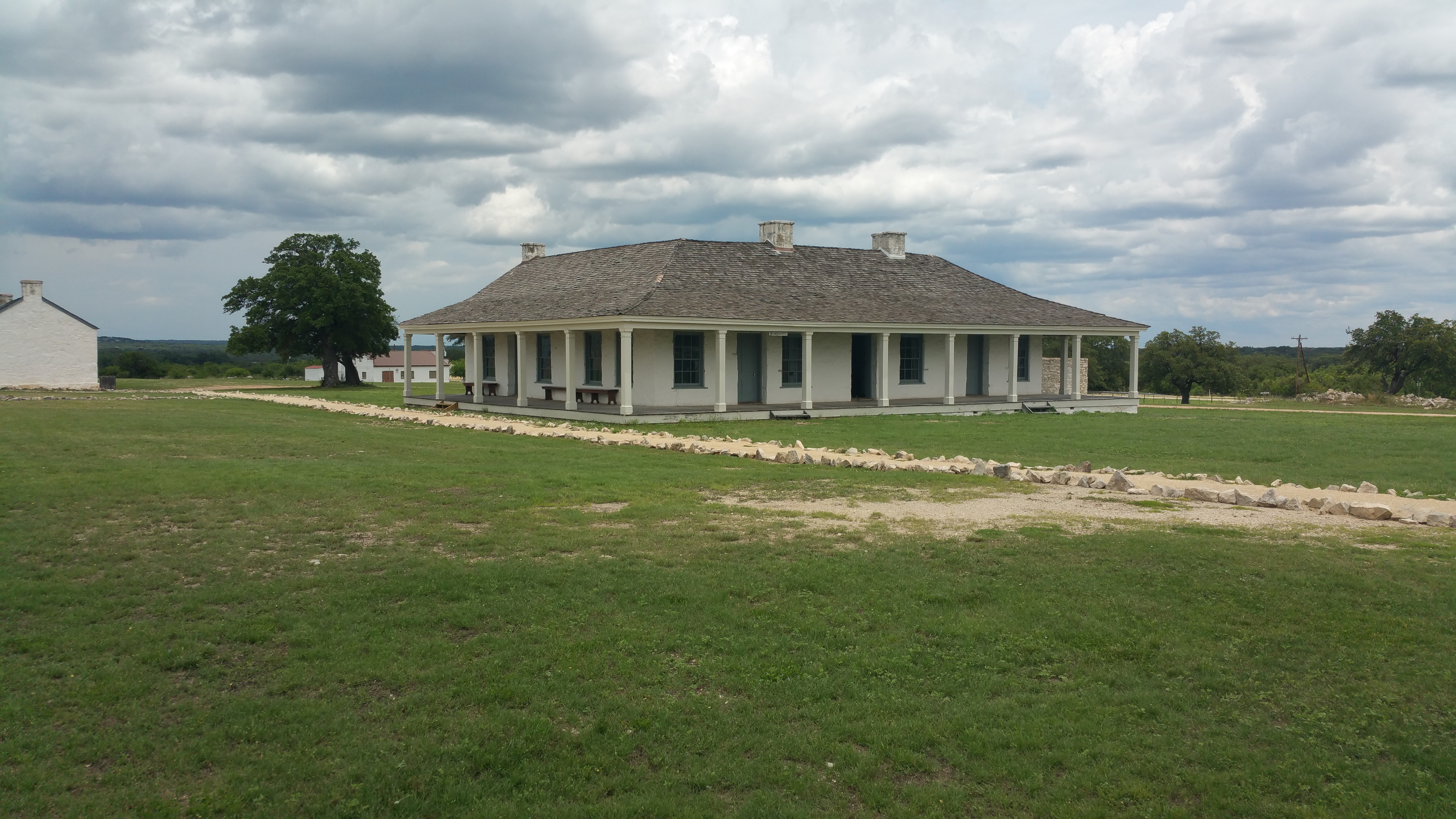
The headquarters building

Restoration of the fort began in 1967 with the purchasing of several of its buildings by the Texas Parks and Wildlife Department, which established the Fort McKavett State Historic Site. Archaeological digs were carried out on the site in June and July 1969 to locate lost features of the fort, the restoration of which continued for the rest the 20th century; by 1990, 17 buildings had been restored. Fort McKavett was nominated for inclusion on the National Register of Historic Places on June 18, 1969, and was included on July 14, 1971. On January 1, 2008, Fort McKavett was transferred from the Texas Parks and Wildlife Department to the Texas Historical Commission. As of October 1, 2016, the Fort McKavett State Historic Site covers 82 acres (33 ha).

The fort received three Recorded Texas Historic Landmarks: In 1936, marker number 4795 for the site of Fort McKavett; in 1963, marker number 1998 for Fort McKavett C. S. A.; and in 1968, marker number 4642 for the Sentry Building.

== See also ==
- Texas Forts Trail
- List of Texas state historic sites
- National Register of Historic Places listings in Menard County, Texas
