= Fort McKavett, Texas =

Fort McKavett
- Location within the state of Texas Fort McKavett (the United States)
- Coordinates: 30°49′38″N 100°6′24″W
- Country: United States
- State: Texas
- County: Menard
- Elevation: 2,169 ft (661 m)
- Time zone: UTC-6 (Central (CST))
  - Summer (DST): UTC-5 (CDT)
- ZIP codes: 76841
- GNIS feature ID: 1357592

Fort McKavett is a ghost town in Menard County, Texas, United States. It lies at the intersections of Farm to Market Road 864 and Farm to Market Road 1674, 20 miles southwest of the county seat, Menard. Its elevation is 2,169 feet (661 m). It has a post office with the ZIP code 76841.

== History ==
The settlement of Fort McKavett had its 1850s origins as a civilian population just north of Camp San Saba in Menard County (not the Camp San Saba in McCulloch County), with the name of Scabtown. Camp San Saba closed in 1859, and many residents fled to safer areas to be protected against Indian depredations. The United States Army reopened the outpost in 1869 as Fort McKavett. As the civilian population of Scabtown grew, the community was renamed after Fort McKavett, and the local economy began to thrive. The Army closed the fort in 1883, but the earlier relocation of native American tribes made the civilians feel safe enough to remain. The population grew, and with it an economy that supported two hotels, three churches, a newspaper, and a mattress factory. The population peaked at 150 at the beginning of the 20th century, but declined in the latter half of the century.

The writer Robert E. Howard, a Texas history enthusiast, visited Fort McKavett in 1933, and wrote: "McKavett is fascinating - a village of ruins and semiruins, people living in the old unruined barracks and officers's quarters, among the remnants of other buildings which had not stood the test of time.

== Notable people ==
- Harry D. Thiers
- E.B. Beaumont

== Climate ==
The climate in this area is characterized by hot, dry summers and generally mild to cool winters. According to the Köppen climate classification system, Fort McKavett has a mid-latitude arid desert climate, BWk on climate maps. The hottest temperature recorded in was 112 °F (44.4 °C) on June 22, 2023, while the coldest temperature recorded was 3 °F (−16.1 °C) on January 9–10, 2010.

Climate data for Fort McKavett, Texas, 1991–2020 normals, extremes 1858–1880, 1997–present
Month	Jan	Feb	Mar	Apr	May	Jun	Jul	Aug	Sep	Oct	Nov	Dec	Year
Record high °F (°C)	89 (32)	94 (34)	94 (34)	102 (39)	108 (42)	112 (44)	109 (43)	108 (42)	104 (40)	100 (38)	94 (34)	88 (31)	112 (44)
Mean maximum °F (°C)	79.7 (26.5)	83.5 (28.6)	88.5 (31.4)	94.3 (34.6)	99.3 (37.4)	101.5 (38.6)	102.1 (38.9)	102.7 (39.3)	98.2 (36.8)	92.7 (33.7)	85.0 (29.4)	80.4 (26.9)	104.3 (40.2)
Mean daily maximum °F (°C)	60.4 (15.8)	64.8 (18.2)	71.3 (21.8)	79.9 (26.6)	86.0 (30.0)	92.2 (33.4)	94.8 (34.9)	94.2 (34.6)	87.9 (31.1)	79.7 (26.5)	68.8 (20.4)	61.4 (16.3)	78.5 (25.8)
Daily mean °F (°C)	45.0 (7.2)	49.5 (9.7)	57.0 (13.9)	65.1 (18.4)	73.0 (22.8)	79.7 (26.5)	81.9 (27.7)	81.2 (27.3)	74.5 (23.6)	65.6 (18.7)	54.4 (12.4)	46.5 (8.1)	64.5 (18.0)
Mean daily minimum °F (°C)	29.7 (−1.3)	34.2 (1.2)	42.6 (5.9)	50.3 (10.2)	59.9 (15.5)	67.1 (19.5)	69.1 (20.6)	68.2 (20.1)	61.2 (16.2)	51.4 (10.8)	40.0 (4.4)	31.6 (−0.2)	50.4 (10.2)
Mean minimum °F (°C)	14.4 (−9.8)	16.7 (−8.5)	21.1 (−6.1)	31.1 (−0.5)	41.1 (5.1)	57.5 (14.2)	62.6 (17.0)	60.4 (15.8)	48.2 (9.0)	31.5 (−0.3)	22.1 (−5.5)	16.0 (−8.9)	11.6 (−11.3)
Record low °F (°C)	−2 (−19)	8 (−13)	10 (−12)	21 (−6)	30 (−1)	34 (1)	50 (10)	51 (11)	34 (1)	22 (−6)	13 (−11)	7 (−14)	−2 (−19)
Average precipitation inches (mm)	1.12 (28)	1.18 (30)	1.90 (48)	1.99 (51)	2.89 (73)	3.28 (83)	1.75 (44)	2.26 (57)	2.92 (74)	2.62 (67)	1.80 (46)	0.79 (20)	24.50 (622)
Average precipitation days (≥ 0.01 in)	4.0	4.6	5.5	4.5	6.4	4.8	4.7	5.3	5.5	5.3	4.8	4.6	60.0
Source 1: NOAA
Source 2: National Weather Service (mean maxima/minima 1981–2010)
