= Camp Verde, Texas =

- Unincorporated community
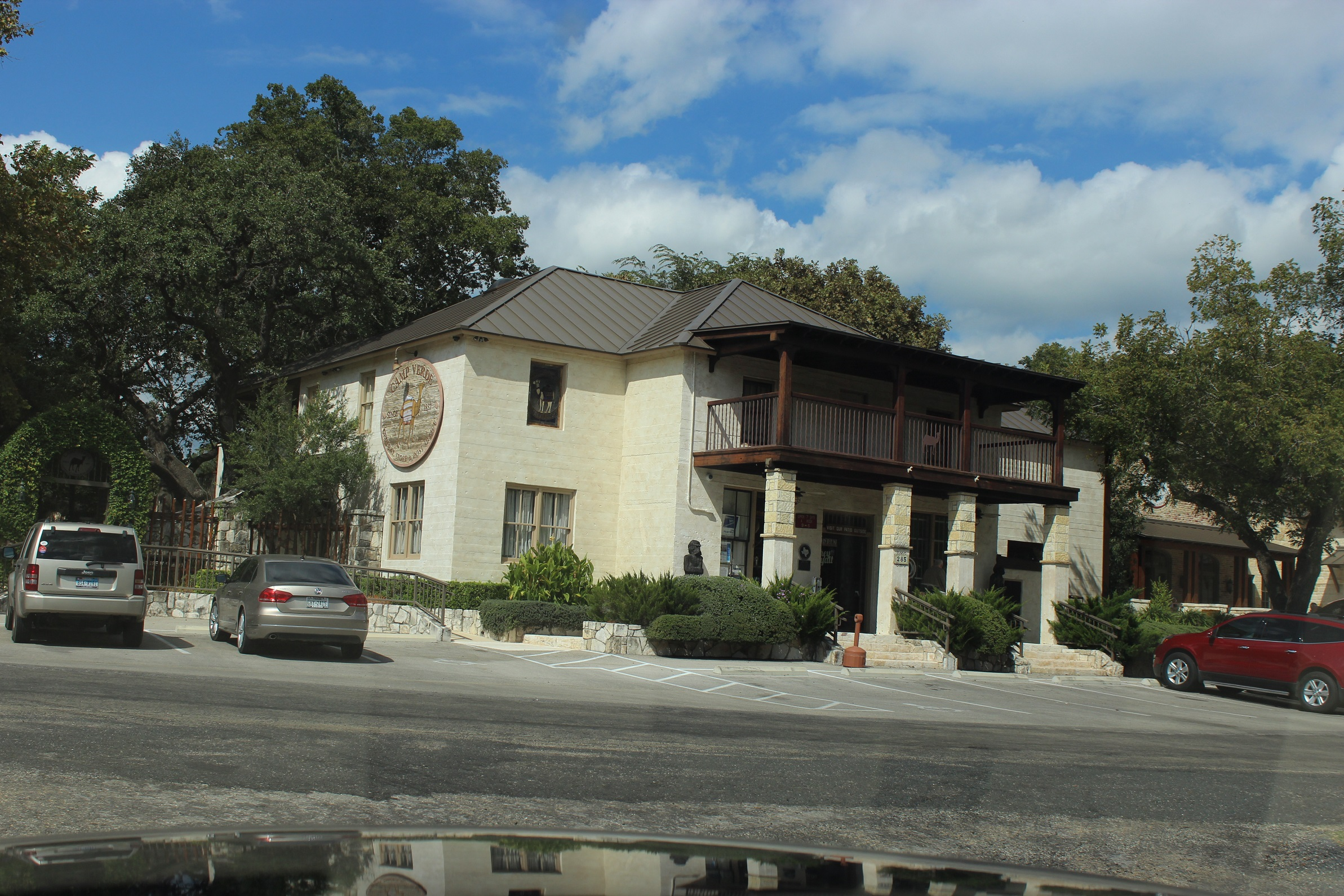
- General Store and Post Office (2016)

- Location within Texas Location within the United States
- Coordinates: 29°53′38″N 99°06′17″W
- Country: United States
- State: Texas
- County: Kerr
- Elevation: 1,611 ft (491 m)
- Time zone: UTC-6 (CST)
  - Summer (DST): UTC-5 (CDT)
- ZIP Code: 78010
- Area code: 830
- FIPS code: 48-12364
- GNIS ID: 1332015

Camp Verde is an unincorporated community in Kerr County, Texas, United States. It is approximately the halfway point between Bandera and Kerrville along SH 173 in the Texas Hill Country.

== History ==
The town of Camp Verde came about from the Old Camp Verde military camp. The town grew around the old Williams community store (opened in 1857), which was built to serve the soldiers stationed at the base. After Williams died in 1858, German immigrant Charles Schreiner acquired the store. After the camp was abandoned, the store continued to operate as a post office for area residents.

The first post office opened in 1858, running out of Schreiner's store. This post office closed in 1866. When the post office reopened in 1887, Charles C. Kelly served as post master. However, this post office was also closed in 1892. Walter S. Nowlin re-established the post office and store in 1899.

=== The Camel Experiment ===
In 1854, Secretary of War Jefferson Davis (who later became the president of the Confederacy), pushed for the use of camels by the American Army. The initiative was passed by Congress on March 3, 1855, and the first camels arrived in the area in April 1856. After the fort was deactivated in 1869, the experiment died with it.

=== General Store ===
The Camp Verde General Store is still in operation to this day, having been in operation for over 150 years. The store has become somewhat of a tourist attraction in the area. The store also runs the post office and operates a restaurant.

== Geography ==
=== Climate ===
The climate in this area is characterized by hot, humid summers and generally mild to cool winters. According to the Köppen Climate Classification system, Camp Verde has a humid subtropical climate, abbreviated "Cfa" on climate maps.
