= Old Camp Verde =

- U.S. National Register of Historic Places
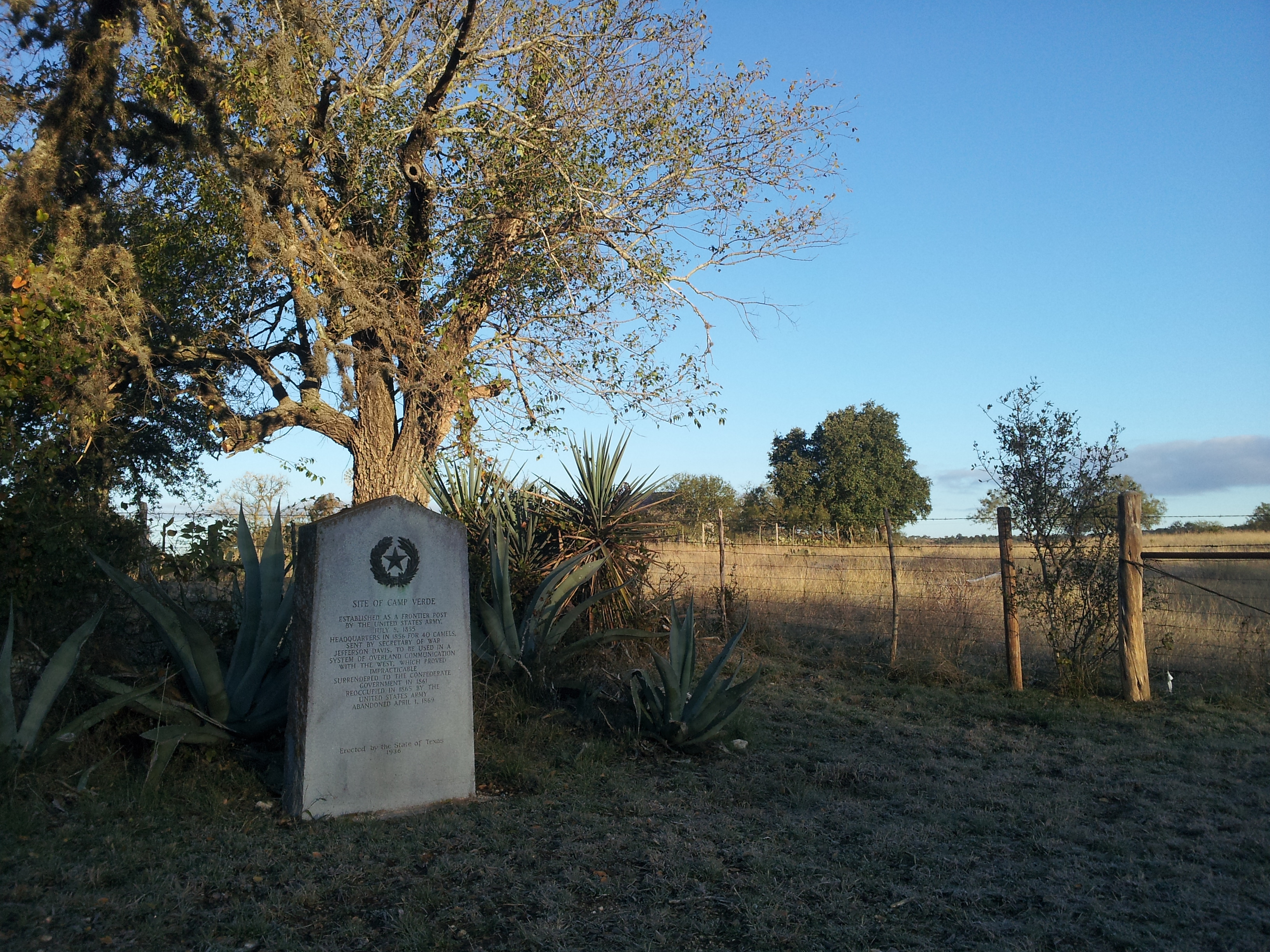
- Camp Verde

- Location within Texas Location within the United States
- Nearest city: Camp Verde, Texas
- Coordinates: 29°53′25″N 99°7′13″W
- Area: 30 acres (12 ha)
- Built: 1856
- Architect: Jules Poindsard
- NRHP reference No.: 73001968
- Added to NRHP: May 25, 1973

Camp Verde was a United States Army facility established on July 8, 1856 in Kerr County, Texas. It was along the road from San Antonio to El Paso next to the Verde Creek.

Construction of Camp Verde began in July 1855. In addition to soldier quarters there was a one-hundred-yard-square area surrounded by a twelve-foot-tall adobe wall complete with stalls and feeding troughs.

The camp was the headquarters for U.S. Camel Corps, which experimented with using dromedaries as pack animals in the southwestern United States. The Army imported camels in 1856 and 1857, using them with some success in extended surveys in the Southwest. The camels did not get along with the Army's horses and mules, which would bolt out of fear when they smelled a camel. The soldiers found the camels difficult to handle and they detested the smell of the animals.

During the Civil War, on 28 February 1861 Confederate troops captured more than 80 camels and two foreign drivers at Camp Verde. A Texas Ranger company was assigned the camp in 1862 and J.W. Walker was in care of the camels, some of which were used to transport salt from San Antonio and Brownsville and San Elizario, while some transported cotton to Mexico. Three were let loose and found their way to Arkansas, where Federal troops sent them to Iowa to be sold.

Some camels were kept in San Antonio, where Rip Ford considered using them in his recapture of Fort Brown due to the drought conditions between the Nueces and Rio Grande. They were sent to Guadalupe, where two died, before being sent back to Camp Verde.

When Union troops reoccupied Camp Verde in 1865, they found about 66 camels remaining, which they auctioned off to Bethel Coopwood. Bethel sold five to Ringling Brothers Circus and other circus owners in Mexico, but when he brought the remaining camels back into the US, the government took back their brand. They reconsidered and soon released them. The camels were sent to Arizona, where they "gradually perished".

Camp Verde was abandoned on April 1, 1869. Ruins of the officers' quarters are located on what is now private land. A Texas state historic marker and the entrance gate stand by the road. The site was added to the National Register of Historic Places on May 25, 1973.

== Camel Military Corps ==
Secretary of War Jefferson Davis chose Henry C. Wayne to direct the US Camel Military Corps and, upon advice from Edward Fitzgerald Beale, placed David Dixon Porter in command of the ship, Supply, tasked on 10 May 1855 "to proceed without delay to the Levant" for the "purchase and importation of camels and dromedaries to be employed for military purposes". Wayne and Porter made stops in Tunis, Malta, Smyrna, Salonika, Constantinople, Balaklava and Alexandria, Wayne noting "the one-humped camel had carried army burdens of 600 pounds apiece for an average of twenty-five miles a day. Those simply ridden by soldiers were capable of journeying seventy miles daily."

The camels arrived in the US at Indianola, Texas on 29 April 1856 with an "American officer" and his staff, "two Turks" and "three Arabs". The 34 drove of camels included a "Tunis Camel", "Bactrian Camels", a "Booghdee Camel" (or Tuilu, a cross of a Bactrian and dromedary), "Arabian" male and female camels, a "Sennar Dromedary", a "Muscat dromedary", "Siout" male and female dromedaries, and a "Mt. Sinai dromedary". They completed the move to Camp Verde by 27 August. The camp khan or camel corral had 150 feet-long walls ten feet high, with huts along the rear wall for the native camel drivers.

Porter made a second journey to the Levant under Davis's orders, returning to Texas with forty-one camels on 10 February 1857, plus nine additional men and one boy, including Hadji Ali and George Caralambo. This completed the mission of Wayne and Porter. Responsibilities for the camels resided with the commander of Camp Verde, Captain Innis N. Palmer.

Davis's replacement as Secretary of War, John B. Floyd, chose Edward F. Beale to command the Camel Corps. He was ordered to survey a wagon road from Fort Defiance, New Mexico, to the Colorado River. Faulk departed Camp Verde on 19 June 1857 with twenty-five camels, leaving behind forty-six, taking the Lower road from San Antonio to El Paso; he reached the Fort Defiance area by 24 August and the Colorado river on 17 October. Beale noted the camels had gone for up to thirty-six hours without water, subsisted on bitter greasewood shrubs, and were impossible to stampede. The camels continued to Fort Tejon.

By 1858 Camp Verde had about fifty camels and Fort Tejon twenty-five. Yet, the new commander of the Department of Texas, Brevet Major General David E. Twiggs stated, "I do not want the camels in my command." He did, however, in 1859, order Edwart L. Hartz to make a topographical survey of the Big Bend region with twenty-four camels. Afterward, Hartz reported, "Not only the capability, but the superiority of the camel for military purposes in the badly-watered sections of country, seems to be established...the patience, endurance, and steadiness which characterize the performance of the camels during this march is beyond praise..."

== Gallery ==
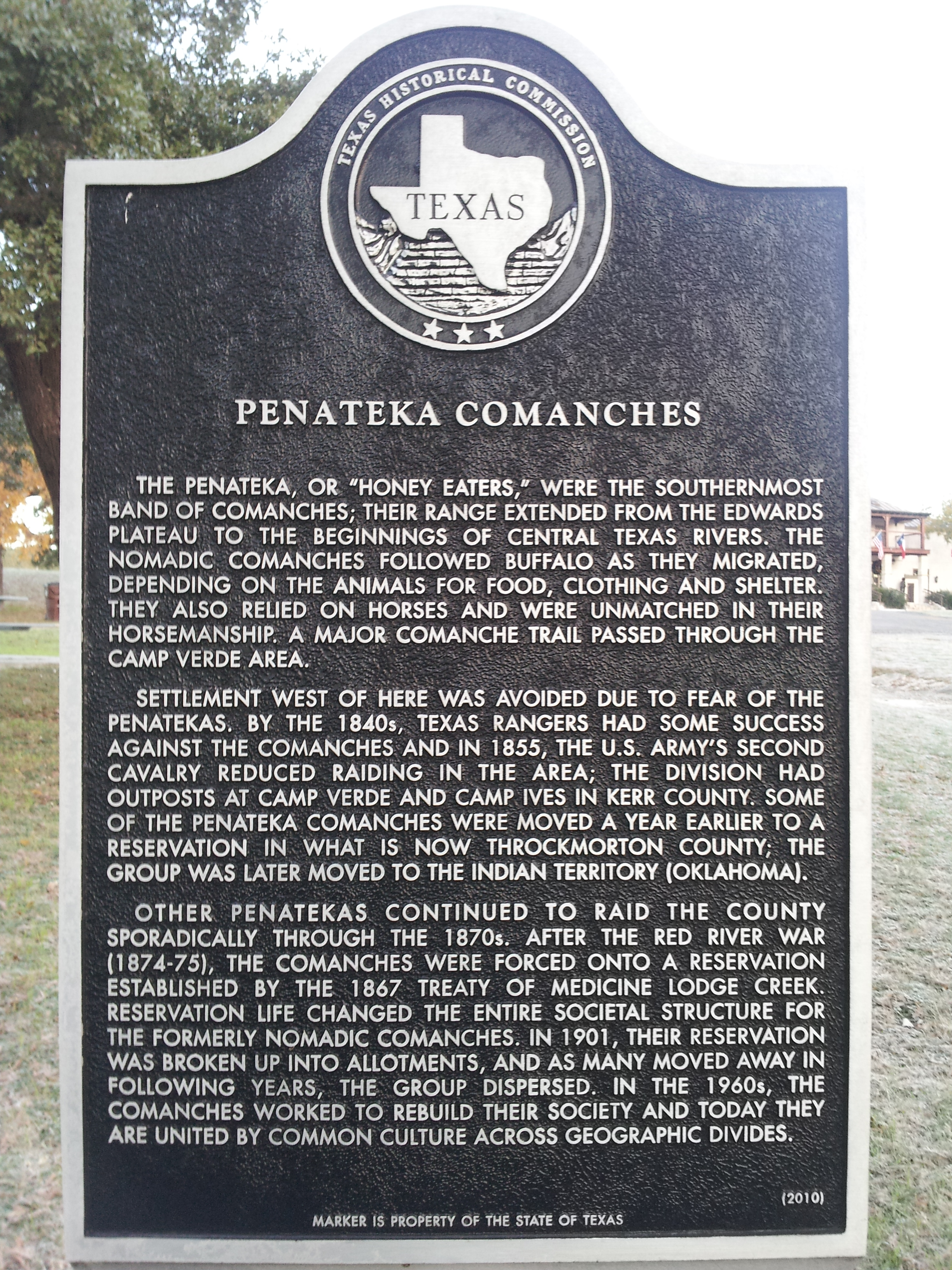
The Penateka and reason for the fort.

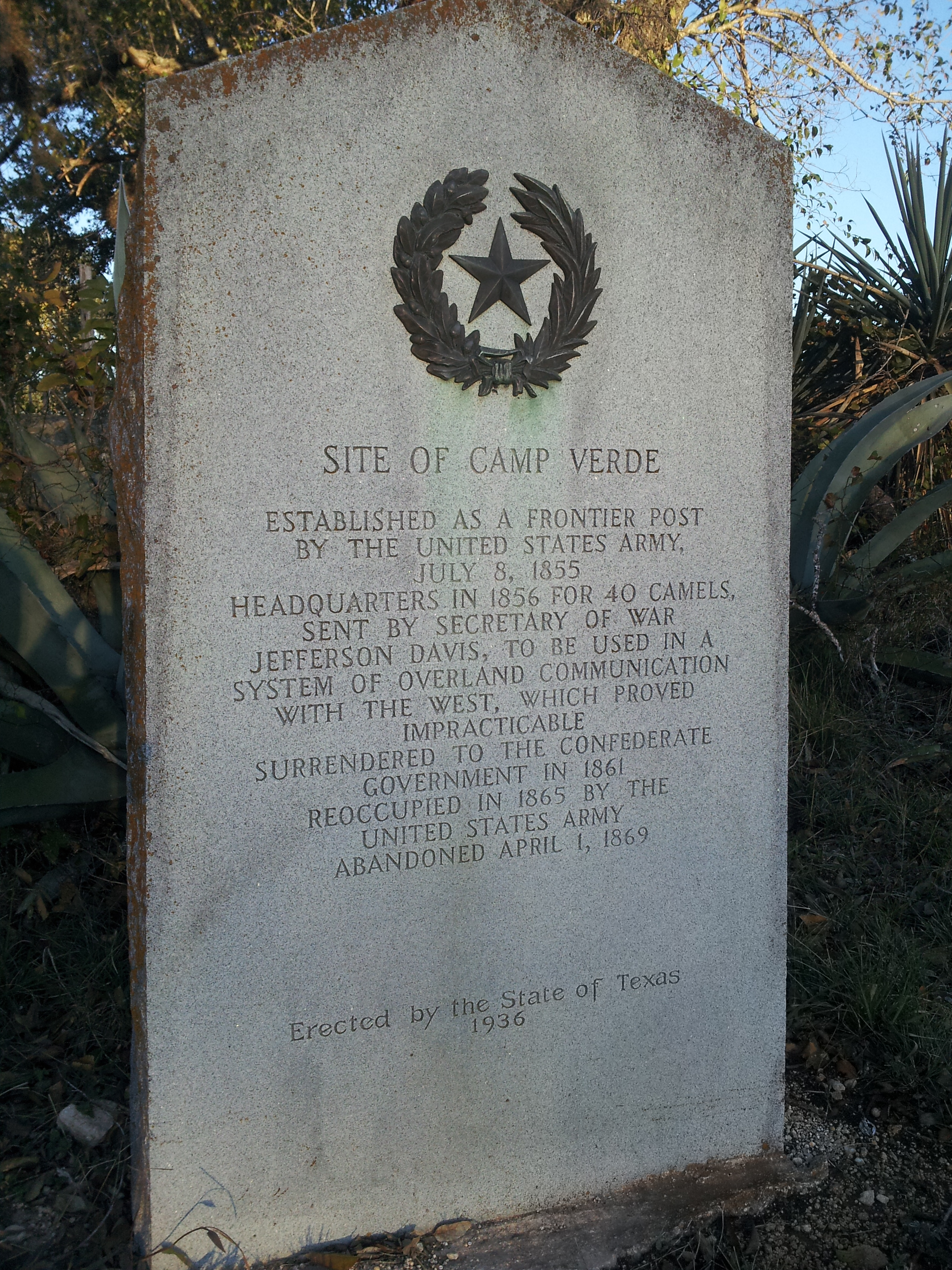
Historical marker

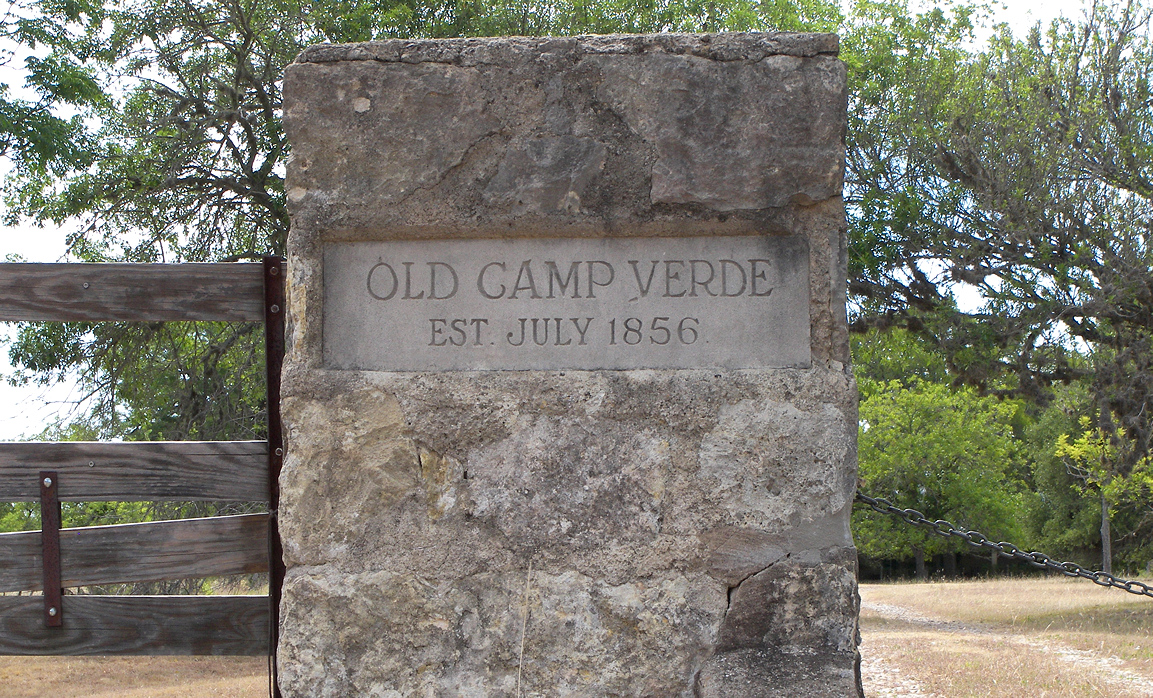
Old marker

== See also ==
- U.S. Camel Corps
- National Register of Historic Places listings in Kerr County, Texas
- Recorded Texas Historic Landmarks in Kerr County
