= Menard, Texas =

- City
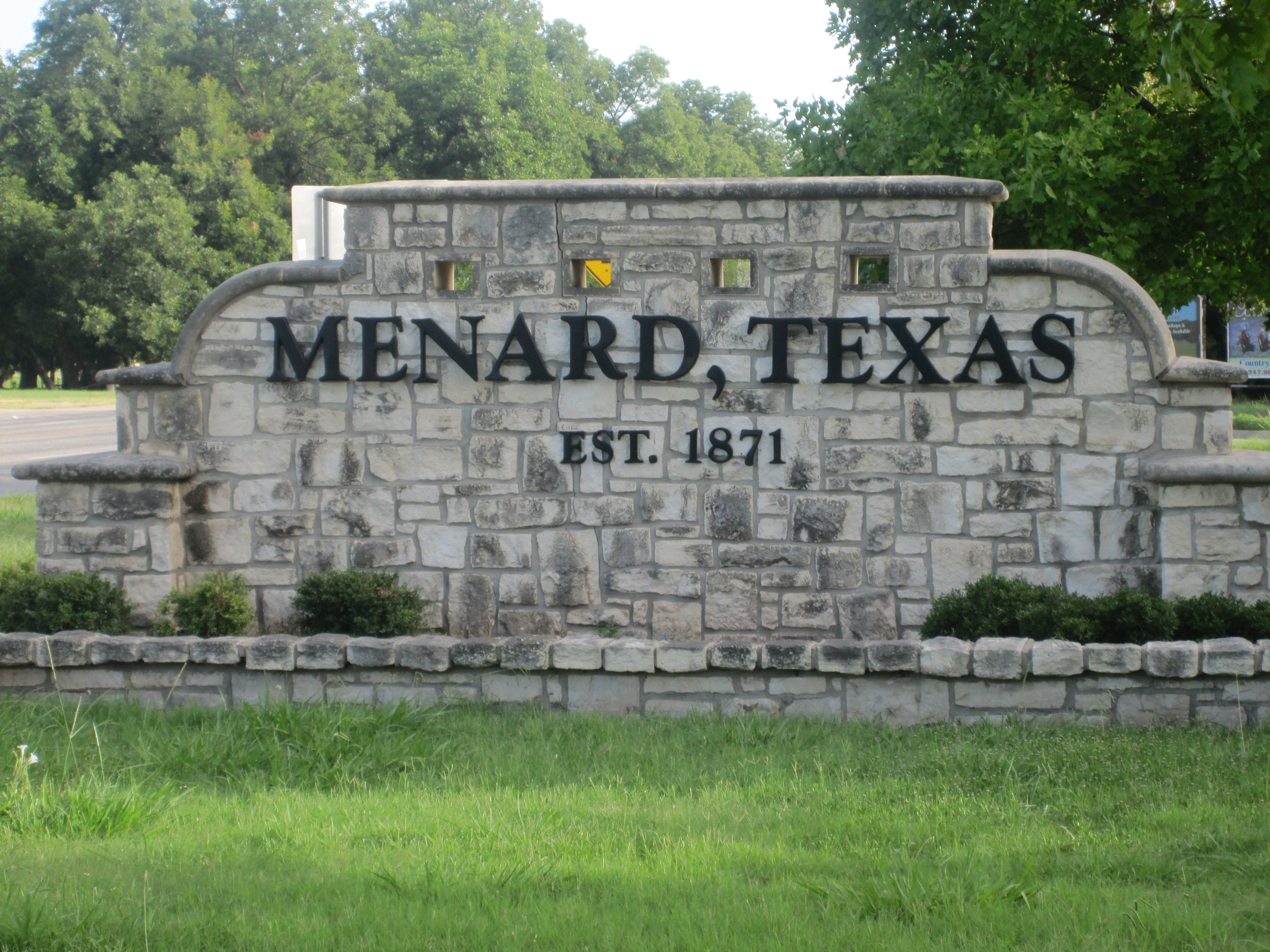
- Menard welcome sign

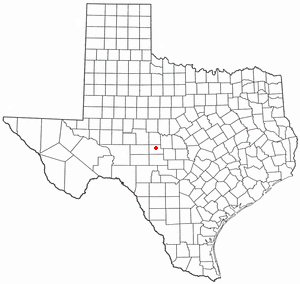
- Location of Menard, Texas

- Coordinates: 30°55′06″N 99°47′01″W
- Country: United States
- State: Texas
- County: Menard

Area
  - Total: 2.06 sq mi (5.34 km^{2})
  - Land: 2.06 sq mi (5.34 km^{2})
  - Water: 0 sq mi (0.00 km^{2})
- Elevation: 1,877 ft (572 m)

Population (2020)
  - Total: 1,348
  - Density: 653.8/sq mi (252.43/km^{2})
- Time zone: UTC-6 (Central (CST))
  - Summer (DST): UTC-5 (CDT)
- ZIP code: 76859
- Area code: 325
- FIPS code: 48-47628
- GNIS feature ID: 2411076

Menard (mə-NARD) is a city in and the county seat of Menard County, Texas, United States. Its population was 1,348 at the 2020 census.

== Geography ==
Menard is located along the banks of the San Saba River at the junction of U.S. Highways 83 and 190, approximately 140 miles northwest of Austin and San Antonio in central Menard County.

According to the United States Census Bureau, the city has a total area of 2.1 square miles (5.4 km^{2}), all land.

== History ==
The first settlement at the site of what is now Menard was the Spanish Mission San Sabá and the Presidio of San Luís de Amarillas, both established in April 1757. The presidio was later replaced by the Presidio of San Sabá in 1761. Both were intended to protect New Spain's northern frontier from marauding Comanches. Due to the presidio's isolation, it suffered repeated attacks, and was finally abandoned in 1770. Stones from the old presidio walls were used by later settlers to build homes and fences. The ruins of the old presidio were reconstructed in 1936.

The community was first known as Menardville when the site was laid out in 1858, after the formation of Menard County. Nearby Fort McKavett was deactivated in 1859, leaving the settlers with little protection from frequent raids from nearby Native Americans. The fort reopened after the Civil War. By 1867, Menardville had a store, a blacksmith shop, and a saloon. The community served as a trading post and overnight stop on north and west cattle trails. A county government was organized in 1871 and a two-story courthouse was built one year later. Menardville had around 150 residents by the mid-1880s. The San Saba River flooded in 1899, causing considerable damage to the community.

In 1910 or 1911, while the Fort Worth and Rio Grande Company was making plans to lay a track through the community, company officials asked residents to rename their town Menard to facilitate the painting of signs. An economic boom followed the arrival of the first train in 1911. The 1920 census recorded 1,164 people living in Menard. For many years, the town served as the principal shipping point for Menard County. Although the community was affected by the Great Depression, both of its banks—the Menard National Bank and Bevans State Bank—remained open. Menard's population stood at 1,969 in 1930, 2,375 in 1940, and 2,685 in 1950. That figure began to decline during the 1950s and 1960s, as road improvements made travel and shipping less dependent on rail service. The Atchison, Topeka and Santa Fe Railroad discontinued its service to Menard in 1972, but donated the depot to the county for use as a history museum. The Menard County Historical Society began collecting artifacts in 1975 and dedicated the museum in 1978. By 1980, 1,697 people were living in Menard. In 1990, the population fell slightly to 1,606 before rebounding to 1,653 in 2000.

== Demographics ==
Historical population
Census	Pop.	Note	%±
1880	67		—
1890	185		176.1%
1920	1,164		—
1930	1,969		69.2%
1940	2,375		20.6%
1950	2,685		13.1%
1960	1,914		−28.7%
1970	1,740		−9.1%
1980	1,697		−2.5%
1990	1,606		−5.4%
2000	1,653		2.9%
2010	1,471		−11.0%
2020	1,348		−8.4%
U.S. Decennial Census

=== 2020 census ===
As of the 2020 census, Menard had a population of 1,348 and a median age of 48.3 years. 20.5% of residents were under the age of 18 and 26.5% of residents were 65 years of age or older. For every 100 females there were 94.8 males, and for every 100 females age 18 and over there were 92.8 males age 18 and over.

There were 568 households in Menard, of which 25.7% had children under the age of 18 living in them. Of all households, 44.0% were married-couple households, 21.0% were households with a male householder and no spouse or partner present, and 28.3% were households with a female householder and no spouse or partner present. About 33.3% of all households were made up of individuals and 18.7% had someone living alone who was 65 years of age or older.

There were 723 housing units, of which 21.4% were vacant. The homeowner vacancy rate was 2.2% and the rental vacancy rate was 7.9%.

0.0% of residents lived in urban areas, while 100.0% lived in rural areas.

Menard racial composition (NH = Non-Hispanic) (Note: Note: the US Census treats Hispanic/Latino as an ethnic category. This table excludes Latinos from the racial categories and assigns them to a separate category. Hispanics/Latinos can be of any race.)
Race	Number	Percent
White	949	70.4%
Black or African American	11	0.8%
American Indian and Alaska Native	11	0.8%
Asian	4	0.3%
Native Hawaiian and Other Pacific Islander	2	0.1%
Some other race	164	12.2%
Two or more races	207	15.4%
Hispanic or Latino (of any race)	605	44.9%

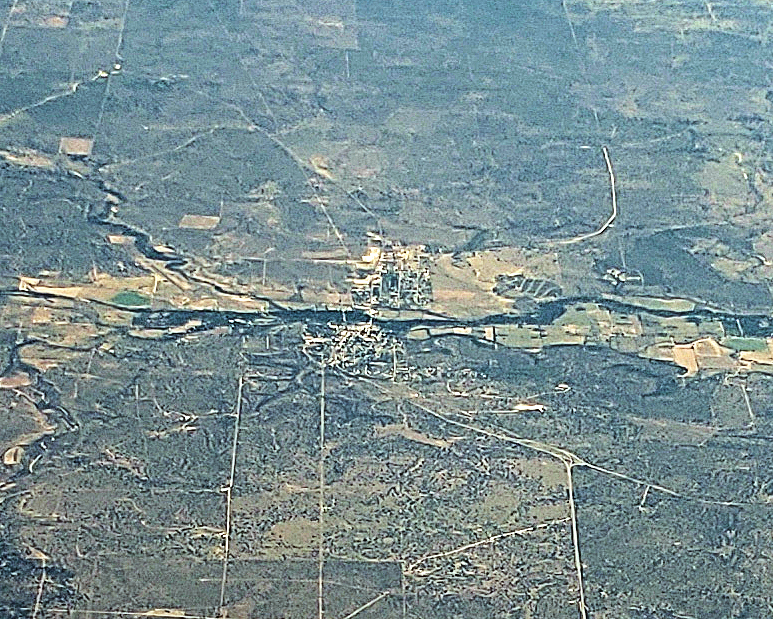
Aerial photo of Menard, Texas

=== 2000 census ===
As of the census of 2000, 1,653 people, 666 households, and 438 families resided in the city. The population density was 803.5 inhabitants per square mile (310.2/km^{2}). The 851 housing units had an average density of 413.6 per square mile (159.7/km^{2}). The racial makeup of the city was 84.94% White, 0.67% African American, 0.60% Native American, 0.36% Asian, 0.06% Pacific Islander, 11.98% from other races, and 1.39% from two or more races. Hispanics or Latinos of any race were 39.32% of the population.

Of the 666 households, 31.8% had children under 18 living with them, 50.2% were married couples living together, 10.8% had a female householder with no husband present, and 34.1% were not families. About 31.4% of all households were made up of individuals, and 20.0% had someone living alone who was 65 or older. The average household size was 2.42 and the average family size was 3.03.

In the city, the age distribution was 27.2% under 18, 6.0% from 18 to 24, 23.7% from 25 to 44, 22.6% from 45 to 64, and 20.6% who were 65 or older. The median age was 40 years. For every 100 females, there were 97.3 males. For every 100 females 18 and over, there were 87.5 males.

The median income for a household in the city was $19,698, and for a family was $27,125. Males had a median income of $21,094 versus $17,857 for females. The per capita income for the city was $12,768. About 26.5% of families and 33.1% of the population were below the poverty line, including 45.4% of those under age 18 and 28.2% of those age 65 or over.

== Education ==
Public education in the City of Menard is provided by the Menard Independent School District and home to the Menard High School Yellow Jackets.

All of Menard County is in the service area of Howard County Junior College District.

== Attractions ==
Annual events in Menard include the Jim Bowie Trail Ride in September, the Saucedo family reunion, and the Silver Mine Classic Lamb Show in October.

== Climate ==
The climate in this area is characterized by hot, humid summers and generally mild to cool winters. According to the Köppen climate classification, Menard has a humid subtropical climate, Cfa on climate maps.

Climate data for Menard, Texas (1991–2020 normals, extremes 1895–1905, 1914–1933, 1962–2019)
Month	Jan	Feb	Mar	Apr	May	Jun	Jul	Aug	Sep	Oct	Nov	Dec	Year
Record high °F (°C)	91 (33)	97 (36)	98 (37)	107 (42)	114 (46)	112 (44)	111 (44)	110 (43)	109 (43)	99 (37)	93 (34)	87 (31)	114 (46)
Mean daily maximum °F (°C)	59.9 (15.5)	64.5 (18.1)	71.4 (21.9)	79.9 (26.6)	85.9 (29.9)	91.5 (33.1)	95.1 (35.1)	94.8 (34.9)	88.1 (31.2)	79.8 (26.6)	68.2 (20.1)	60.9 (16.1)	78.3 (25.7)
Daily mean °F (°C)	44.7 (7.1)	48.8 (9.3)	56.0 (13.3)	64.1 (17.8)	72.0 (22.2)	78.4 (25.8)	81.4 (27.4)	80.9 (27.2)	74.1 (23.4)	64.5 (18.1)	53.6 (12.0)	46.0 (7.8)	63.7 (17.6)
Mean daily minimum °F (°C)	29.4 (−1.4)	33.2 (0.7)	40.6 (4.8)	48.3 (9.1)	58.1 (14.5)	65.3 (18.5)	67.8 (19.9)	67.0 (19.4)	60.1 (15.6)	49.1 (9.5)	39.0 (3.9)	31.0 (−0.6)	49.1 (9.5)
Record low °F (°C)	−2 (−19)	−1 (−18)	7 (−14)	20 (−7)	27 (−3)	43 (6)	48 (9)	40 (4)	33 (1)	20 (−7)	9 (−13)	−6 (−21)	−6 (−21)
Average precipitation inches (mm)	1.11 (28)	1.35 (34)	2.10 (53)	2.00 (51)	3.40 (86)	3.07 (78)	1.58 (40)	2.00 (51)	2.20 (56)	2.50 (64)	1.80 (46)	1.21 (31)	24.32 (618)
Average precipitation days (≥ 0.01 in)	5.2	5.1	5.8	4.7	5.8	6.0	4.4	5.8	5.1	5.3	4.7	4.4	62.3
Source: NOAA

== Gallery ==
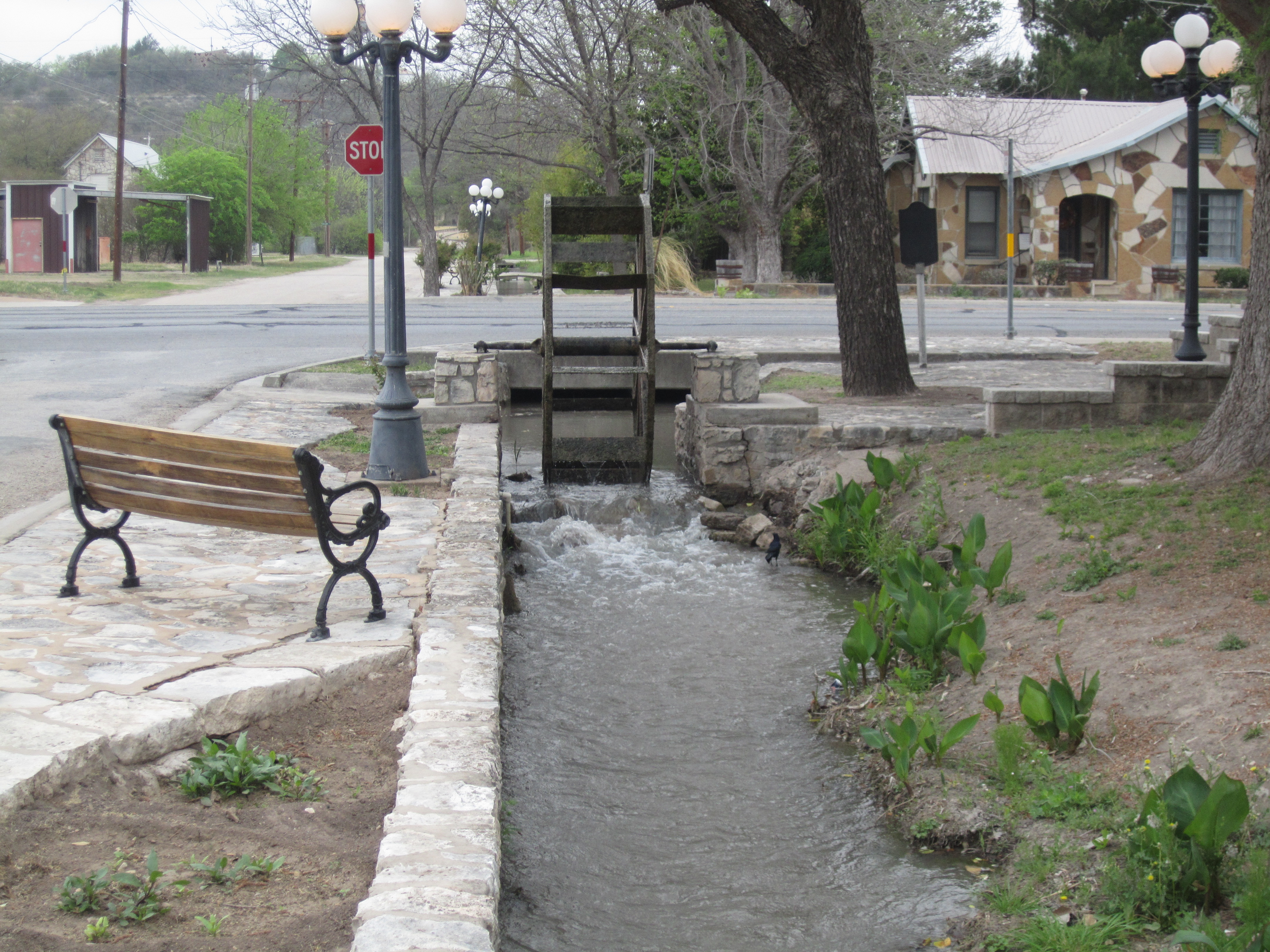
"The Ditch"

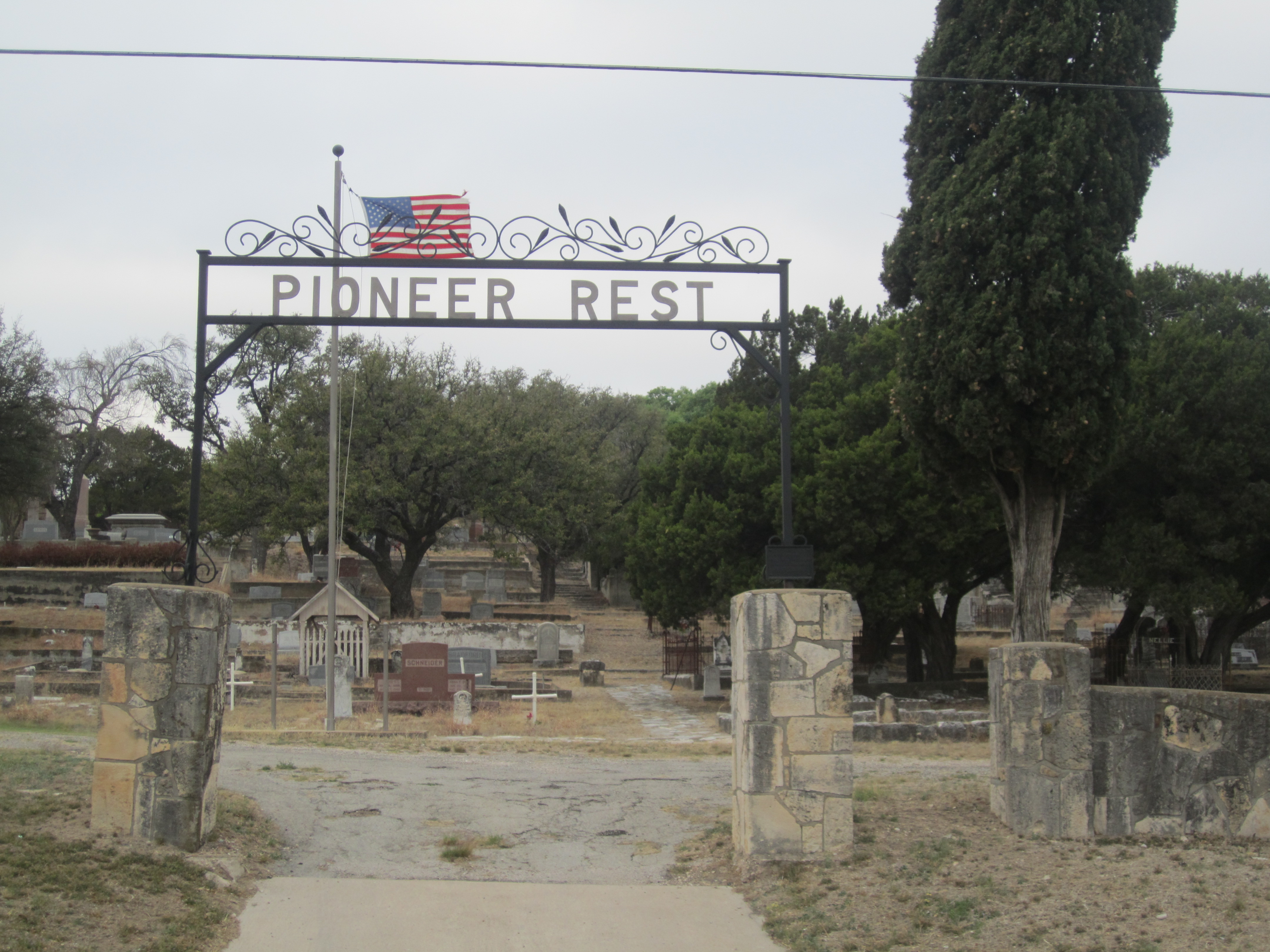
Pioneer Rest Cemetery in Menard has graves from the 19th century

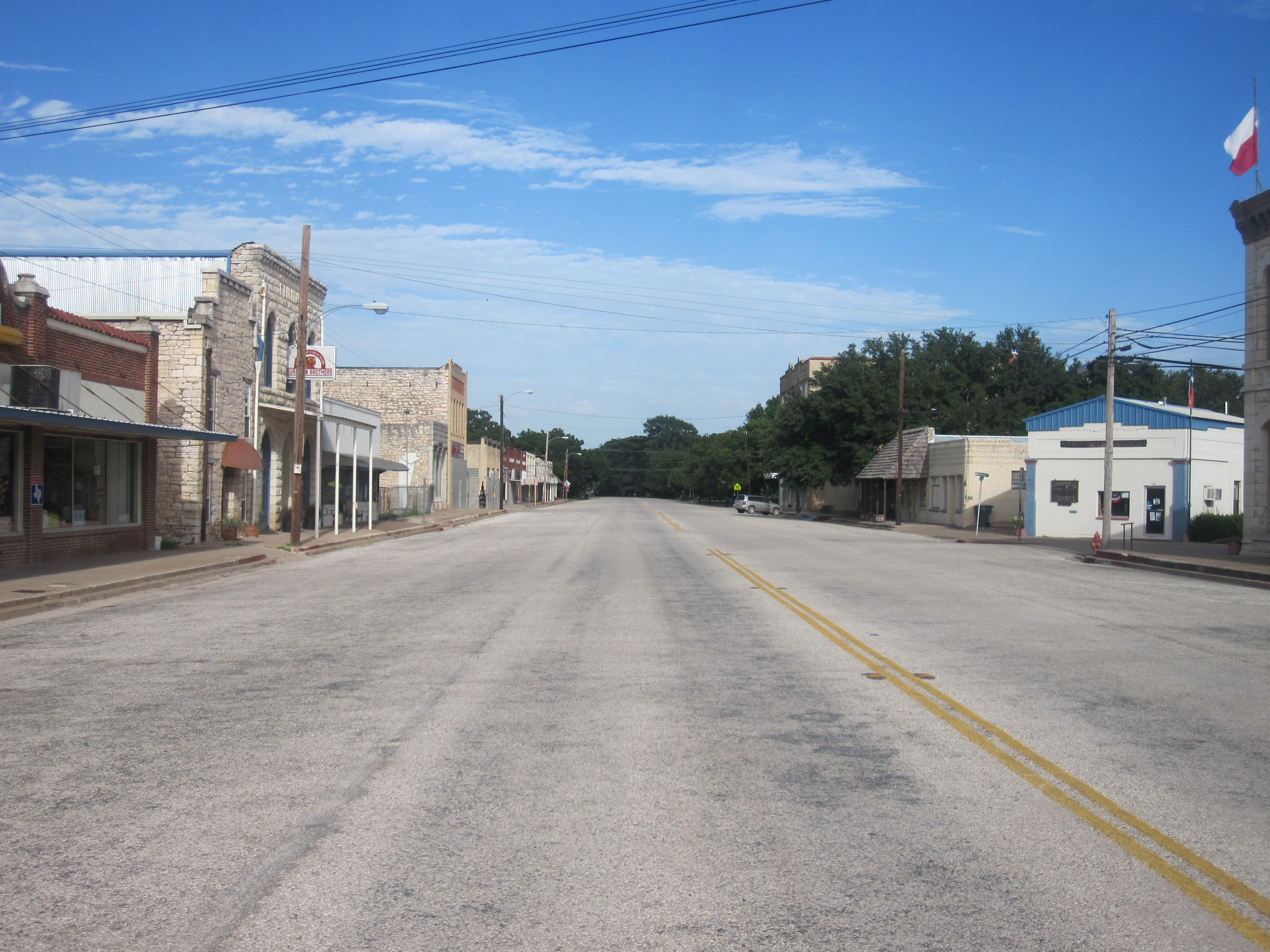
Downtown Menard on a nearly deserted summer Saturday evening

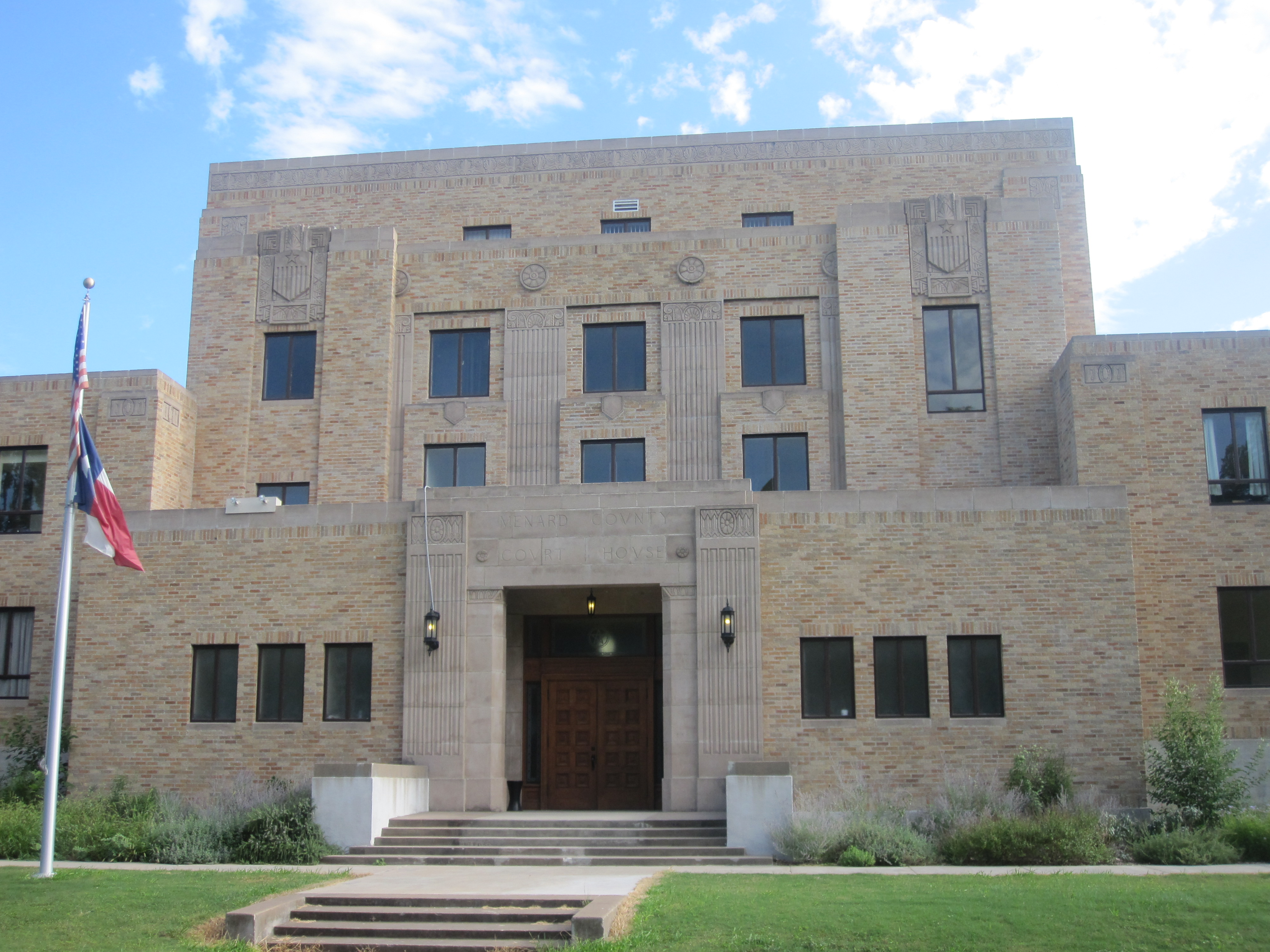
Menard County Courthouse in Menard, Texas

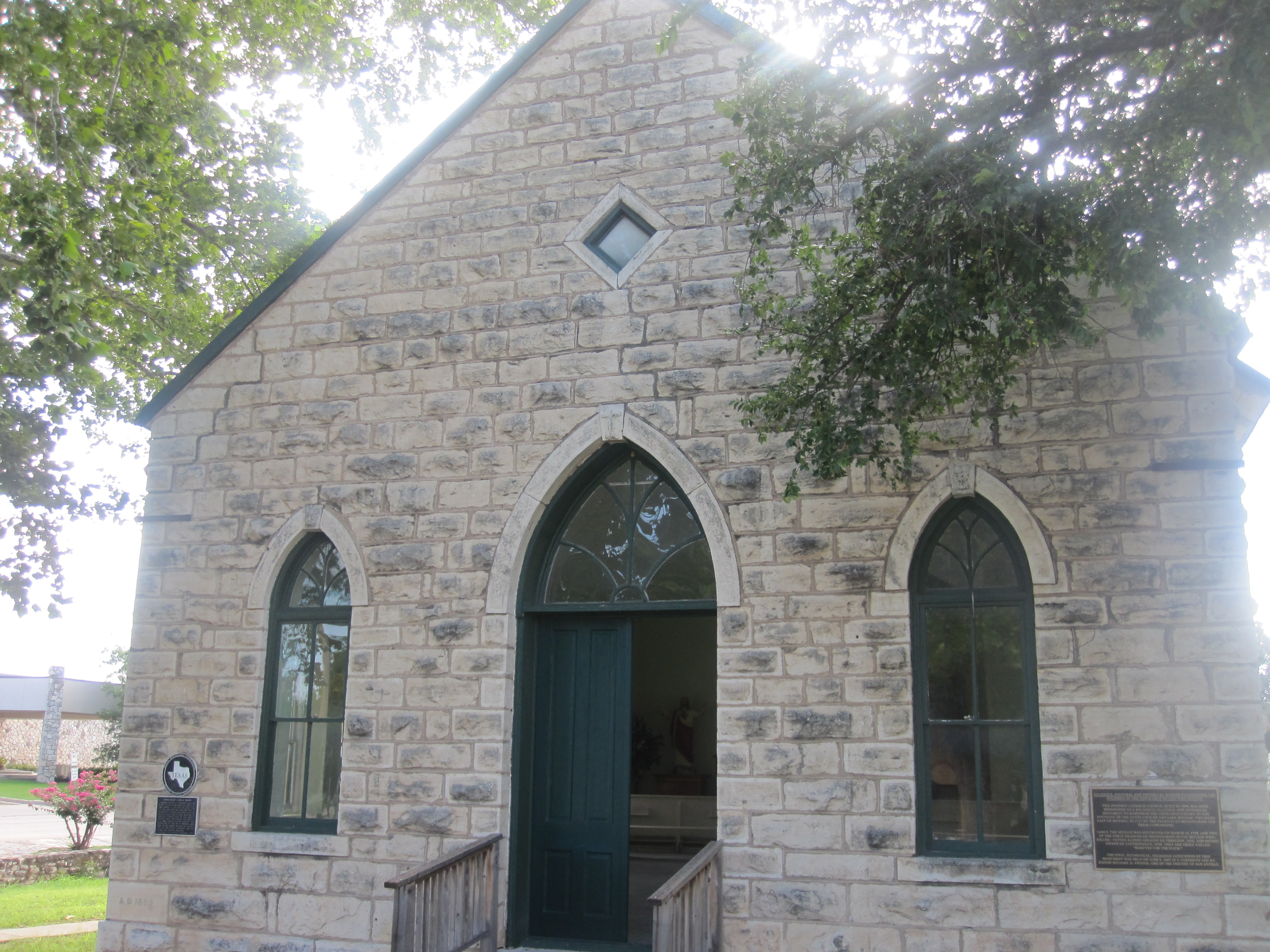
Sacred Heart Catholic Church (1899 building) in Menard

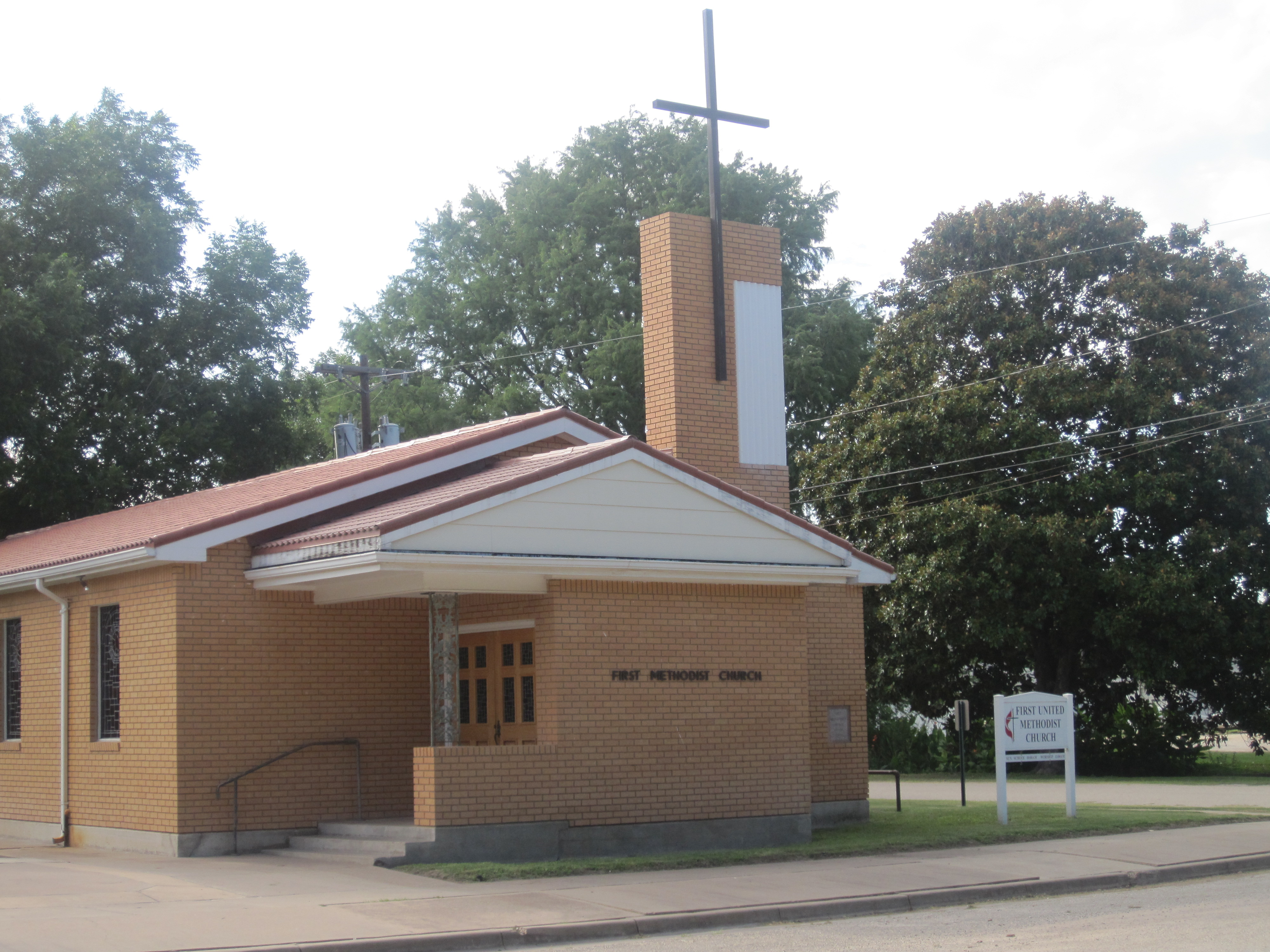
First United Methodist Church in Menard
