= Menard County, Texas =

County in Texas, United States

- County
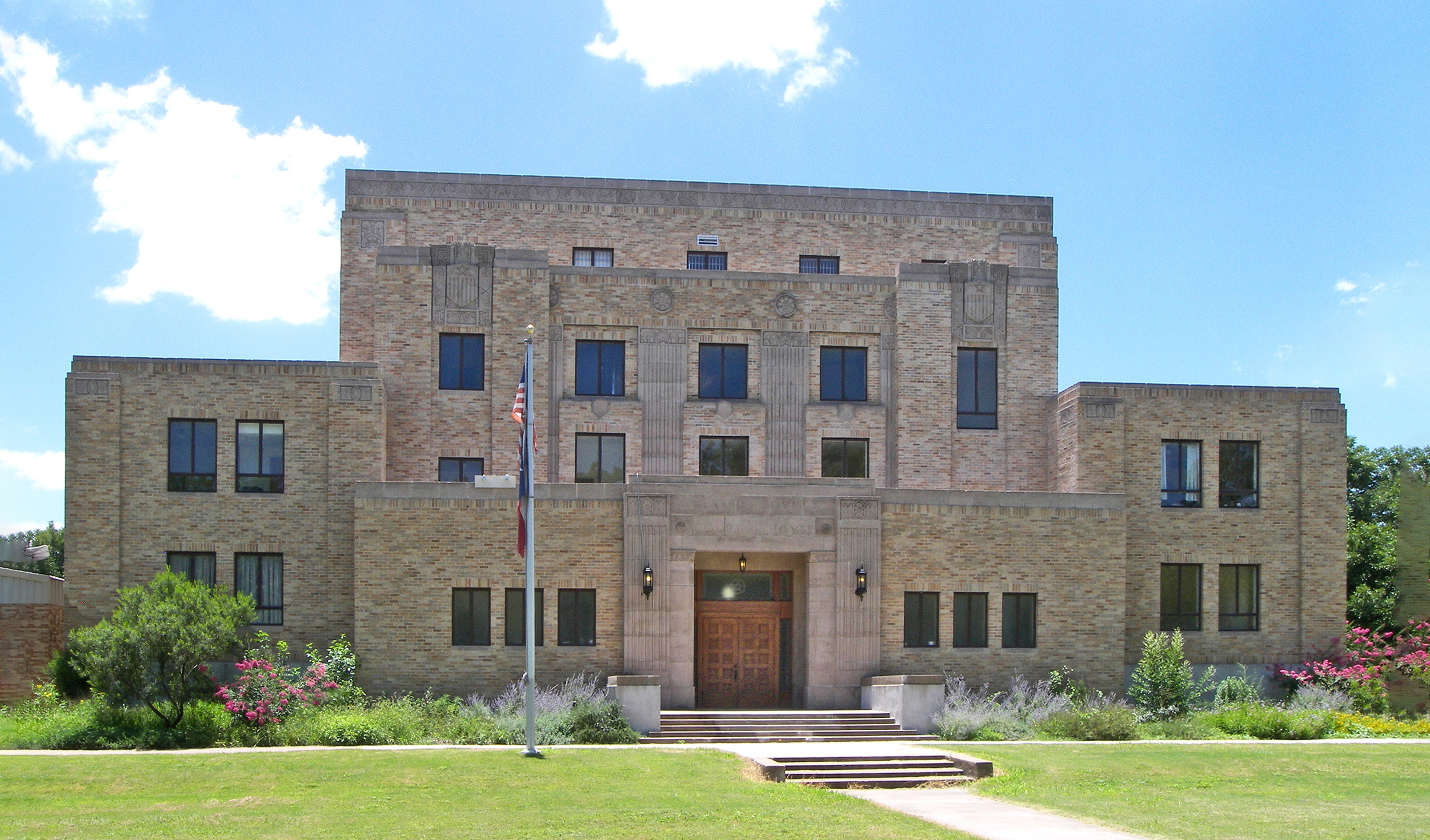
- The Menard County Courthouse in Menard

- Location within the U.S. state of Texas
- Coordinates: 30°54′N 99°49′W
- Country: United States
- State: Texas
- Founded: 1871
- Named for: Michel Branamour Menard
- Seat: Menard
- Largest city: Menard

Area
  - Total: 902 sq mi (2,340 km^{2})
  - Land: 902 sq mi (2,340 km^{2})
  - Water: 0.2 sq mi (0.52 km^{2}) 0.03%

Population (2020)
  - Total: 1,962
  - Estimate (2025): 1,956 ▼
  - Density: 2.18/sq mi (0.840/km^{2})
- Time zone: UTC−6 (Central)
  - Summer (DST): UTC−5 (CDT)
- Congressional district: 11th
- Website: www.co.menard.tx.us

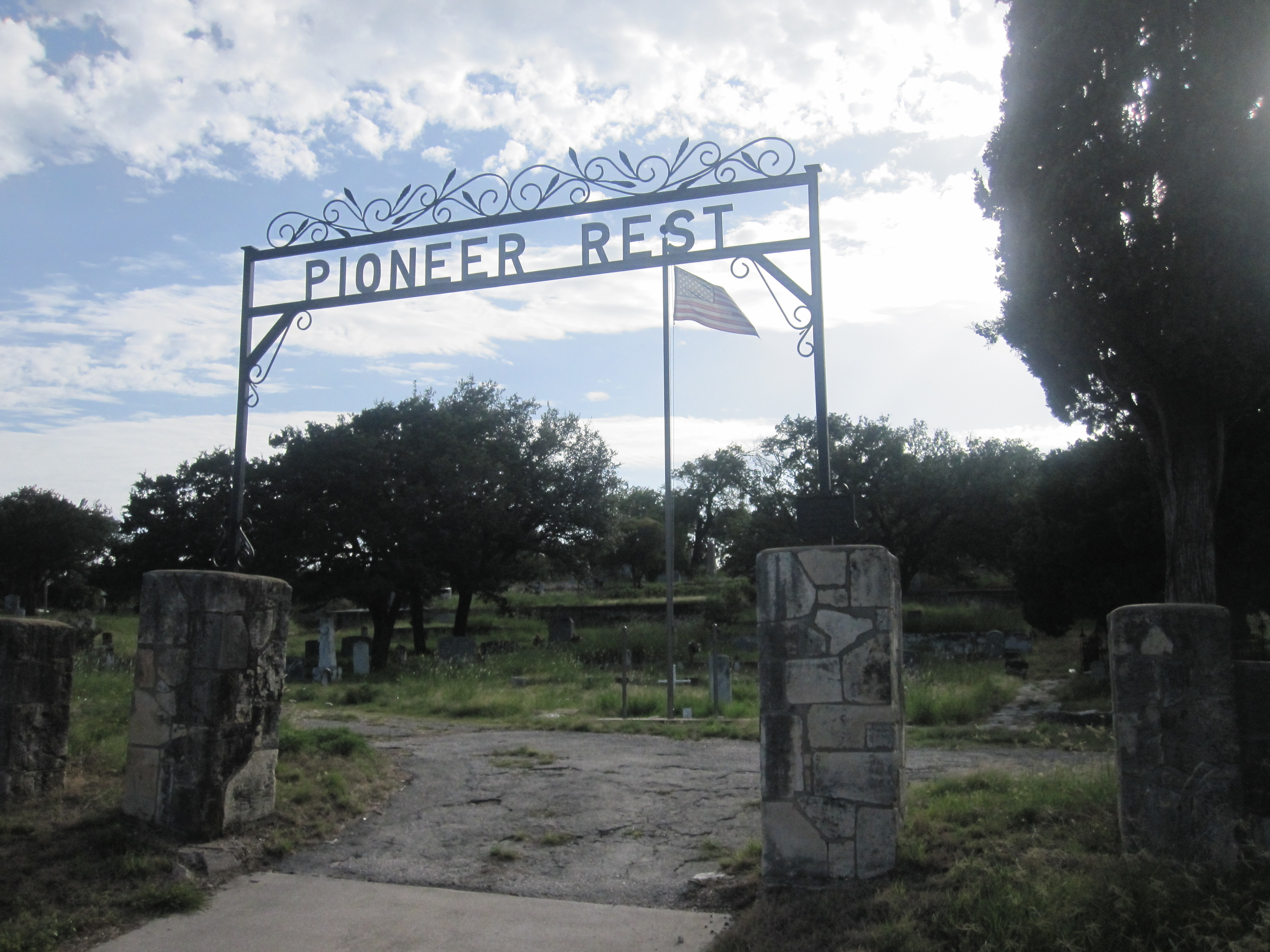
Historic Pioneer Rest Cemetery in Menard has graves dating to the 19th century.

Menard County is a county located on the Edwards Plateau in the U.S. state of Texas. As of the 2020 census, its population was 1,962. The county seat is Menard. The county was created in 1858 and later organized in 1871. It is named for Michel Branamour Menard, the founder of Galveston, Texas.

== History ==
Around 8000 BC, Native American inhabitants arrived. Later Native Americans included Comanche and Lipan Apache. In 1757, Father Alonso Giraldo de Terreros founded Presidio San Luis de las Amarillas, as a support for Santa Cruz de San Sabá Mission, for the Apache Indians. In the 1830s, James Bowie and Rezin P. Bowie scoured the San Saba valley seeking a silver mine that the Spanish had believed to be in the area. They were unsuccessful, but the legend of the Lost Bowie Mine, also known as the Lost San Saba Mine or the Los Almagres Mine, fed the imaginations of treasure-seekers for the next 150 years.

Camp San Saba was established in 1852 to protect settlers from Indian attacks. The state legislature formed Menard County from Bexar County in 1858. The county was named for Michel Branamour Menard, the founder of Galveston. Menardville, later known as Menard, became the county seat.

By 1870, the county population was 667: 295 were white, and 372 were black, possibly due to the Buffalo Soldiers at Fort McKavett. The next year, county residents elected their own officials. The county had an immigrant influx from Mexico. In 1911, the Fort Worth and Rio Grande Railroad Company arrived. Gas deposits were tapped in 1929, but plugged for lack of a market. The local Parent-Teacher Association offered free lunches for needy children in 1931.

In 1934, the Texas Relief Cannery was in operation. The Drought Relief Program bought cattle and sheep from area ranchers. A gas well was redrilled in 1941, and produced about seven million cubic feet of gas. In 1946, a small oilfield was discovered northeast of Fort McKavett, but was abandoned the following year. By the 1960s, oil and gas production had an average annual yield more than 270,000 barrels (43,000 m^{3}). In the 1980s, of the county's 40 oilfields, about 20 were still active, producing 132,000 to 185,000 barrels (29,400 m^{3}) annually.

== Geography ==
According to the U.S. Census Bureau, the county has a total area of 902 square miles (2,340 km^{2}), of which 0.2 sq mi (0.52 km^{2}) (0.03%) is covered by water.

=== Major highways ===
- US 83
- US 190
- US 377
- SH 29

=== Adjacent counties ===
- Concho County (north)
- McCulloch County (northeast)
- Mason County (east)
- Kimble County (south)
- Schleicher County (west)
- Sutton County (southwest)
- Tom Green County (northwest)

== Demographics ==
Historical population
Census	Pop.	Note	%±
1870	667		—
1880	1,239		85.8%
1890	1,215		−1.9%
1900	2,011		65.5%
1910	2,707		34.6%
1920	3,162		16.8%
1930	4,447		40.6%
1940	4,521		1.7%
1950	4,175		−7.7%
1960	2,964		−29.0%
1970	2,646		−10.7%
1980	2,346		−11.3%
1990	2,252		−4.0%
2000	2,360		4.8%
2010	2,242		−5.0%
2020	1,962		−12.5%
2025 (est.)	1,956	▼	−0.3%
U.S. Decennial Census; 1850–2010 2010 2020

=== 2020 census ===
As of the 2020 census, the county had a population of 1,962, the median age was 53.2 years, 18.3% of residents were under the age of 18, and 30.6% of residents were 65 years of age or older. For every 100 females there were 99.2 males, and for every 100 females age 18 and over there were 97.0 males age 18 and over.

The racial makeup of the county was 77.0% White, 0.7% Black or African American, 0.7% American Indian and Alaska Native, 0.3% Asian, 0.2% Native Hawaiian and Pacific Islander, 9.9% from some other race, and 11.3% from two or more races. Hispanic or Latino residents of any race comprised 33.7% of the population.

There were 865 households in the county, of which 23.5% had children under the age of 18 living in them. Of all households, 48.8% were married-couple households, 21.6% were households with a male householder and no spouse or partner present, and 23.7% were households with a female householder and no spouse or partner present. About 31.9% of all households were made up of individuals and 18.3% had someone living alone who was 65 years of age or older.

There were 1,329 housing units, of which 34.9% were vacant. Among occupied housing units, 76.5% were owner-occupied and 23.5% were renter-occupied. The homeowner vacancy rate was 3.5% and the rental vacancy rate was 7.8%.

Less than 0.1% of residents lived in urban areas, while 100.0% lived in rural areas.

=== Racial and ethnic composition ===
Menard County, Texas – Racial and ethnic composition Note: the US Census treats Hispanic/Latino as an ethnic category. This table excludes Latinos from the racial categories and assigns them to a separate category. Hispanics/Latinos may be of any race.
Race / Ethnicity (NH = Non-Hispanic)	Pop 1980	Pop 1990	Pop 2000	Pop 2010	Pop 2020	% 1980	% 1990	% 2000	% 2010	% 2020
White alone (NH)	1,661	1,511	1,567	1,425	1,231	70.80%	67.10%	66.40%	63.56%	62.74%
Black or African American alone (NH)	5	7	10	11	12	0.21%	0.31%	0.42%	0.49%	0.61%
Native American or Alaska Native alone (NH)	7	4	13	6	7	0.30%	0.18%	0.55%	0.27%	0.36%
Asian alone (NH)	1	0	8	3	5	0.04%	0.00%	0.34%	0.13%	0.25%
Native Hawaiian or Pacific Islander alone (NH)	x	x	1	0	3	x	x	0.04%	0.00%	0.15%
Other race alone (NH)	0	4	3	1	8	0.00%	0.18%	0.13%	0.04%	0.41%
Mixed race or Multiracial (NH)	x	x	10	6	34	x	x	0.42%	0.27%	1.73%
Hispanic or Latino (any race)	672	726	748	790	662	28.64%	32.24%	31.69%	35.24%	33.74%
Total	2,346	2,252	2,360	2,242	1,962	100.00%	100.00%	100.00%	100.00%	100.00%

=== 2000 census ===
As of the census of 2000, 2,360 people, 990 households, and 665 families resided in the county. The population density was 3 people per square mile (1.2 people/km^{2}). The 1,607 housing units averaged 2 units per square mile (0.77/km^{2}). The racial makeup of the county was 87.54% White, 0.51% African American, 0.64% Native American, 0.34% Asian, 0.04% Pacific Islander, 9.79% from other races, and 1.14% from two or more races. About 31.69% of the population was Hispanic or Latino of any race.

Of the 990 households, 28.50% had children under the age of 18 living with them, 54.00% were married couples living together, 8.80% had a female householder with no husband present, and 32.80% were not families. Around 30.40% of all households was made up of individuals, and 17.50% had someone living alone who was 65 years of age or older. The average household size was 2.34 and the average family size was 2.91.

In the county, the population was distributed as 24.20% under the age of 18, 5.30% from 18 to 24, 21.90% from 25 to 44, 26.60% from 45 to 64, and 21.90% who were 65 years of age or older. The median age was 44 years. For every 100 females, there were 99.70 males. For every 100 females age 18 and over, there were 93.10 males.

The median income for a household in the county was $24,762, and for a family was $30,872. Males had a median income of $21,953 versus $20,000 for females. The per capita income for the county was $15,987. About 20.00% of families and 25.80% of the population were below the poverty line, including 39.90% of those under age 18 and 19.10% of those age 65 or over.

== Communities ==
=== City ===
- Menard (county seat)

=== Unincorporated communities ===
- Callan
- Erna
- Hext
- Saline

=== Ghost towns ===
- Fort McKavett
- Sunnyside

== Politics ==
United States presidential election results for Menard County, Texas
Year	Republican		Democratic		Third party(ies)	
Year	No.	%	No.	%	No.	%
1912	15	7.50%	109	54.50%	76	38.00%
1916	44	12.83%	267	77.84%	32	9.33%
1920	203	47.65%	197	46.24%	26	6.10%
1924	247	42.73%	304	52.60%	27	4.67%
1928	589	71.57%	234	28.43%	0	0.00%
1932	150	14.25%	901	85.57%	2	0.19%
1936	115	13.48%	734	86.05%	4	0.47%
1940	246	17.57%	1,153	82.36%	1	0.07%
1944	96	8.56%	776	69.16%	250	22.28%
1948	283	28.41%	663	66.57%	50	5.02%
1952	843	67.87%	399	32.13%	0	0.00%
1956	614	65.88%	318	34.12%	0	0.00%
1960	608	55.32%	491	44.68%	0	0.00%
1964	397	40.30%	588	59.70%	0	0.00%
1968	491	50.57%	362	37.28%	118	12.15%
1972	644	69.92%	273	29.64%	4	0.43%
1976	441	44.10%	543	54.30%	16	1.60%
1980	548	52.19%	489	46.57%	13	1.24%
1984	725	64.44%	394	35.02%	6	0.53%
1988	552	47.14%	614	52.43%	5	0.43%
1992	354	27.72%	553	43.30%	370	28.97%
1996	443	42.47%	490	46.98%	110	10.55%
2000	642	64.85%	334	33.74%	14	1.41%
2004	761	68.99%	331	30.01%	11	1.00%
2008	712	69.94%	295	28.98%	11	1.08%
2012	665	78.33%	171	20.14%	13	1.53%
2016	682	78.94%	154	17.82%	28	3.24%
2020	823	80.06%	197	19.16%	8	0.78%
2024	861	82.79%	170	16.35%	9	0.87%

United States Senate election results for Menard County, Texas1
Year	Republican		Democratic		Third party(ies)	
Year	No.	%	No.	%	No.	%
2024	824	79.54%	194	18.73%	18	1.74%

United States Senate election results for Menard County, Texas2
Year	Republican		Democratic		Third party(ies)	
Year	No.	%	No.	%	No.	%
2020	797	79.70%	189	18.90%	14	1.40%

Texas Gubernatorial election results for Menard County
Year	Republican		Democratic		Third party(ies)	
Year	No.	%	No.	%	No.	%
2022	659	85.03%	110	14.19%	6	0.77%

== Education ==
School districts include:

- Menard Independent School District (a wide majority of the county is in this district)
- Eden Consolidated Independent School District
- Mason Independent School District

All of Menard County is in the service area of Howard County Junior College District.

== In popular culture ==
The 1968 movie Journey to Shiloh features a group known as the "Concho County Comanches," and mentions Menard County.

== See also ==
- List of museums in Central Texas
- National Register of Historic Places listings in Menard County, Texas
- Recorded Texas Historic Landmarks in Menard County
