= List of councils of government =

This is a list of lists of councils of government in the United States.

== List ==
=== Arizona ===
- Arizona Association of Counties
- Maricopa Association of Governments

=== Connecticut ===
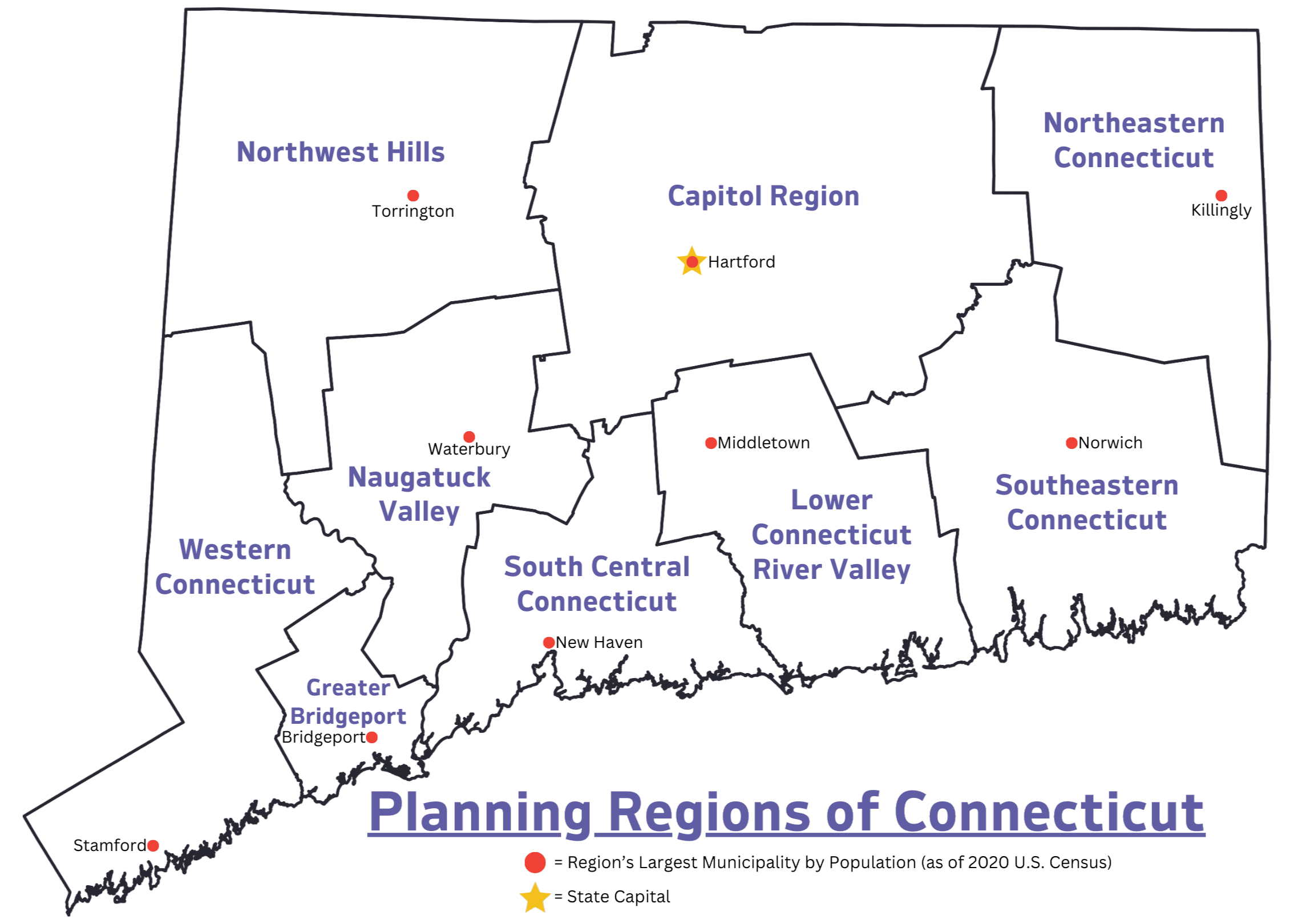
The eight planning regions of Connecticut

- Capitol Planning Region, Connecticut
- Greater Bridgeport Planning Region, Connecticut
- Lower Connecticut River Valley Planning Region, Connecticut
- Naugatuck Valley Planning Region, Connecticut
- Northeastern Connecticut Planning Region, Connecticut
- Northwest Hills Planning Region, Connecticut
- South Central Connecticut Planning Region, Connecticut
- Southeastern Connecticut Planning Region, Connecticut
- Western Connecticut Planning Region, Connecticut

=== Georgia (state) ===
- Atlanta Regional Commission

=== North Carolina ===
- Triangle J Council of Governments

=== Oklahoma ===
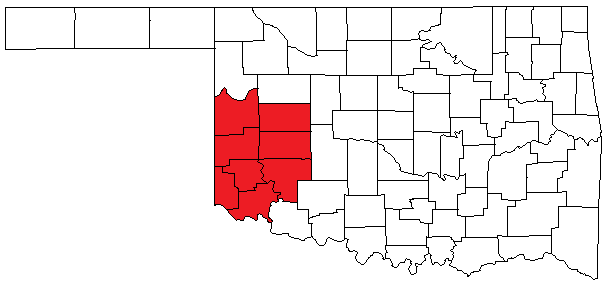
The area served by the South Western Oklahoma Development Authority

- Kiamichi Economic Development District of Oklahoma
- South Western Oklahoma Development Authority

=== Texas ===
- Alamo Area Council of Governments
- Ark-Tex Council of Governments
- Brazos Valley Council of Governments
- Capital Area Council of Governments
- Central Texas Council of Governments
- Coastal Bend Council of Governments
- Concho Valley Council of Governments
- Deep East Texas Council of Governments
- East Texas Council of Governments
- Golden Crescent Regional Planning Commission
- Heart of Texas Council of Governments
- Houston-Galveston Area Council
- Lower Rio Grande Valley Development Council
- Middle Rio Grande Development Council
- Nortex Regional Planning Commission
- North Central Texas Council of Governments
- Panhandle Regional Planning Commission
- Permian Basin Regional Planning Commission
- Rio Grande Council of Governments
- South East Texas Regional Planning Commission
- South Plains Association of Governments
- South Texas Development Council
- Texoma Council of Governments
- West Central Texas Council of Governments

=== Other ===
- Central Iowa Regional Association of Local Governments
- Chesapeake Bay Commission
- Council of Energy Resource Tribes
- Denver Regional Council of Governments, Colorado
- East-West Gateway Council of Governments
- Houston-Galveston Area Council
- Kansas City SmartPort
- Kentucky League of Cities
- Metropolitan Council
- Mid-America Regional Council
- Mid-Region Council of Governments, New Mexico
- New Jersey State League of Municipalities
- Ohio-Kentucky-Indiana Regional Council of Governments
- Southeast Michigan Council of Governments
- State rural development councils
- Toledo Metropolitan Area Council of Governments
- Virginia Planning District Commissions
- Warren-Morris Council of Governments

== See also ==
- Category:Councils of governments
- Lists of counties
- List of administrative divisions by country
