= List of lighthouses in Texas =

There are several lighthouses in the U.S. state of Texas, including several listed on the National Register of Historic Places. Not every lighthouse in Texas is listed here as some have very little information known about them. Saluria, and Swash lights for example were built right before the civil war and were both destroyed by confederate forces.

Name	Image	Location	Coordinates	Year first lit	Automated	Year deactivated	Current Lens	Focal Height
Aransas Pass Light		Port Aransas		1857	Never	Active (Inactive: 1952–1988)	Unknown	Unknown
Brazoz River Light	N/A	Brazoria County	N/A	1896	Never	1967 (Demolished)	None	Unknown
Brazos Santiago Light	N/A	South Padre Island	N/A	1854 (First); 1943 (Last)	Unknown	1974	None	Unknown
Clopper's Bar Light	N/A	Morgan's Point	N/A	1854	Never	1880 (Demolished)	None	35 ft (11 m)
Corpus Christi Light	N/A	Corpus Christi	N/A	1859	Never	1878 (Demolished)	None	72 ft (22 m)
Double Bayou Light	N/A	Oak Island		1900	Never	1915 (Destroyed)	None	Unknown
East Shoal Light	N/A	Galveston	N/A	1872	Never	1875 (Destroyed)	None	Unknown
Fort Point Light		Galveston		1882	Never	1909 (Dismantled in 1953)	None	48 ft (15 m)
Galveston Jetty Light (North)	N/A	Galveston	N/A	1897	Never	Unknown (Removed)	None	42 ft (13 m)
Galveston Jetty Light (South)	N/A	Galveston	N/A	1883 (First); 1918 (Last)	1972	1980 (Destroyed in 2000)	None	42 ft (13 m)
Halfmoon Reef Light		Port Lavaca		1858	Never	1942 (Moved to shore)	None	Unknown
Halfmoon Shoal Light	N/A	Texas City	N/A	1854 (First); 1902 (Last)	Never	1930s (Demolished)	None	35 ft (11 m)
Matagorda Island Light		Port Lavaca		1852 (First); 1873 (Current)	1956	Active (Inactive: 1995–1999)	Unknown	91 ft (28 m)
Point Bolivar Light	Galveston	Point Bolivar		1852 (First); 1872 (Current)	Never	1933	None	116 ft (35 m)
Point Isabel Light		Port Isabel		1853	Never	Active (Inactive: 1905–1955)	Unknown	Unknown
Redfish Bar Light	N/A	Galveston	N/A	1854	Never	1936 (Destroyed)	None	Unknown
Redfish Bar Cut Light	N/A	Galveston	N/A	1900	Never	1936 (Destroyed)	None	39 ft (12 m)
Sabine Bank Light		Port Arthur		1906	1923	2001 (Replaced with skeleton tower)	None	Unknown
Trinity River Light	N/A	Trinity Bay	N/A	1900	Never	1915 (Destroyed)	None	16 ft (4.9 m)

== Faux Lighthouses ==
Name	Image	Location	Coordinates	Year first lit	Automated	Year deactivated	Current Lens	Focal Height
Beacon Island Light	N/A	League City	N/A	1983 (Private)	Always	2023	Unknown	120 ft (37 m)
Scott Self Light		Rockwall	32°53′20″N 96°28′57″W	2008	Always	Active	Unknown	33 ft (10 m)
Horseshoe Bay Light	N/A	Horseshoe Bay	N/A	1972	Always	Active	Unknown	Unknown
Kemah Standpipe	N/A	Kemah	N/A	2006	Always	Active	Third-order Fresnel (Replica)	151 ft (46 m)
Lake Buchanan Light	N/A	Buchanan Dam	N/A	1984	Always	Active (Inactive: 1990–2006)	Unknown	140 ft (43 m)
Lake Canyon Yacht Club	N/A	Canyon Lake	N/A	1985	Always	Active	Unknown	Unknown
Lake Conroe Light	N/A	Willis	N/A	1977 (Rebuilt in 1999)	Always	2024	Unknown	Unknown
