= Texas State Highway 316 =

State highway in Texas

State Highway 316
- SH 316, highlighted in red

Route information
- Maintained by TxDOT
- Length: 9.065 mi (14.589 km)
- Existed: 1939–present

Major junctions
- West end: SH 238 near Port Lavaca
- East end: Matagorda Bay near Indianola

Location
- Country: United States
- State: Texas

Highway system
- Highways in Texas; Interstate; US; State; Former; Toll; Loops; Spurs; FM/RM; Park; Rec
← SH 315	→ SH 317

State Highway 316 (SH 316) is a Texas state highway that runs from near Port Lavaca southeast to the ghost town of Indianola.

== Route description ==
SH 316 begins at a junction with SH 238. It heads southeast from this junction to an intersection with FM 2717. The highway continues to the east to an intersection with FM 2760. SH 316 reaches its eastern terminus at Matagorda Bay. The road officially loops around the Indianola historical marker though the eastern side of the loop is closed off to vehicles.

== History ==
The route was designated on April 1, 1939.

== Junction list ==
The entire route is in Calhoun County.

Location	mi	km	Destinations	Notes
	0.0	0.0	SH 238 – Seadrift, Port O'Connor	
	2.5	4.0	FM 2717 north (Washington Avenue)	Southern terminus of FM 2717
	5.6	9.0	To FM 2760 (Margie Tewmey Road)	
Indianola	9.1	14.6	Indianola Historical Marker	
1.000 mi = 1.609 km; 1.000 km = 0.621 mi
