= Formosa Plastics propylene explosion =

Explosion in Point Comfort, Texas

Coordinates: 28.6965°N 96.5450°W

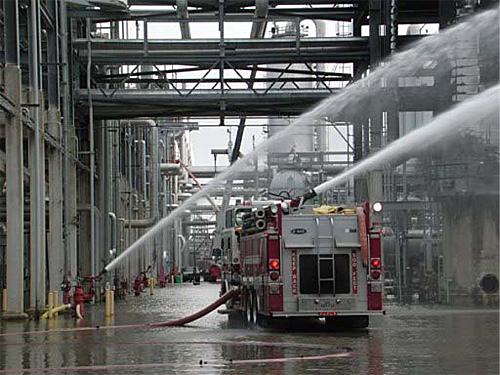
Fire engine from the Emergency Response Team fighting the fires following the explosion.

The Formosa Plastics propylene explosion was a propylene release and explosion that occurred on October 6, 2005, in the Olefins II Unit at the Formosa Plastics plant in Point Comfort, Texas, United States. The subsequent fire burned for five days.

== Formosa Plastics Point Comfort facility ==
The Point Comfort facility is the largest Formosa Plastics plant in the United States. Opened in 1983, it covers 1,800 acres (7.3 km²) and employs 330 full-time employees and 3,500 contract workers, 2,500 of which are construction, and 1,000 are residential workers. Among the employees are 120 personnel making up the plant's Emergency Response Team (ERT) whose members are trained in hazardous material emergencies and fire fighting. There are 20 operating units on the plant producing a variety of petroleum and plastic products.

=== Olefins II Unit ===
The Olefins II Unit uses furnaces to convert naphtha or natural gas into a hydrocarbon mixture containing methane, ethane, ethylene, propylene, and propane. Distillation columns separate the hydrocarbon mix. Some of the gases (such as propylene) are liquified and sent to storage while others are used to fuel the furnaces or are returned to the feedstock. The Unit is protected from overpressure by pressure relief valves which send gases into a flare system where the excess gases are burned at a distance from the Unit. However, on October 6, 2005, such valves were manually operated and could not be reached by workers in time to prevent the explosions.

== The Explosions ==
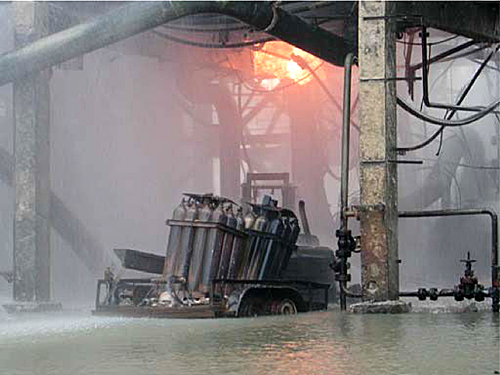
The source of the leak. The trailer holding the canisters hit the piping to its right.

The explosions began shortly after 3 p.m. on October 6, 2005. The resulting fires reached reported heights of up to 800 ft (240 m) in the air and were visible from nearby towns. The fires burned for nearly a week.

On October 6, 2005, around 3:05 p.m., a trailer being pulled by a forklift caught on a valve in the propylene piping system near the Olefins II Unit, pulling the valve and part of the piping loose, leaving a 1.9 inch (3.5 cm) hole. Pressurized liquid propylene poured out of the opening, partially vaporizing, leaving a pool of liquid propylene and creating a flammable vapor cloud. The forklift driver and other nearby contractors saw the cloud and immediately evacuated the area.

A plant operator heard the escaping propylene and the expanding vapor cloud. He notified the plant's control room of the problem. The control room operators saw the leak on closed-circuit television and began to shut down the plant. However, valves that would have prevented further release of chemicals had to be shut off manually. Operators in the vicinity of the leak attempted to reach manual shutoff valves but were driven back by the vapor cloud. As a result, the explosions continued and the fires grew. Fire monitors were then turned on.

Two minutes after the valve was opened, the vapor cloud ignited knocking down several operators who were exiting the unit, severely burning two. The explosion led control room operators to declare a site-wide evacuation order. Shortly thereafter, the control operators began to smell propylene and also evacuated the control center. Yards away from the spreading fire was an area of the plant where flammable chemicals were stored in mass quantities. As the fire continued to spread, workers and contactors were confronted with the very real possibility that the storage tanks would ignite if the fire reached them. Experts estimate that had such an ignition occurred, the entirety of Point Comfort would have been incinerated. Some experts estimate such an ignition would cause even more expansive damage.

Reportedly, hundreds of plant workers and contractors ran toward the gates to evacuate. Many workers who evacuated to gate 6 were met with disappointment when they found the gate to be locked and no one present to unlock it. As a result, many workers jumped the fence in an attempt to flee from the continuing explosions.

The explosion had ignited the propylene pool under the leak and the flames spread up the side of a structure containing several vessels, heat exchangers and pressure relief valves.

The local authorities immediately attempted to issue a shelter in place order to the surrounding community with the exception of Point Comfort Elementary School. However, due to an error in programing, an "all clear" alarm was erroneously sounded. The students and teachers were evacuated to Port Lavaca, about five miles (8 km) away. State Highway 35 was shut down as it runs adjacent to the plant. The shelter order was rescinded at 9 p.m. the next day.

The emergency response team assumed command of the incident and began attacking the fire. At the time of the explosion, two of the off-duty ERT crews were on site for training so a total of 90 members of the ERT were available to respond.

At about 3:35, the side of the structure collapsed causing the emergency vent lines to be crimped. The crimped lines, softened by the heat of the flames, ruptured and burst into flames.

The emergency response team isolated as many fuel sources as possible and allowed smaller fires to burn off the uncontained hydrocarbons. It took five days for all of the fires to be extinguished.

The accident injured an unknown number of workers, four with severe burns requiring hospitalization. Many others were treated for exhaustion, pulmonary problems, and debilitating physical injuries. As yet, the effect on the residents of Calhoun County from the chemicals released by Formosa in the month following the explosions is widely unknown. Over a thousand members of the County have filed complaints against Formosa and others because of the explosions and subsequent release of chemicals.

== Investigation and findings ==
The Chemical Safety and Hazard Investigation Board found that while Formosa Plastics did have procedures in place for vehicles’ speed limits, crane use and a vehicle permitting process, there were no guidelines or restrictions on where vehicles may operate inside the plant. It was also determined that the piping was not properly protected from potential impact as stated in regulations for such facilities.

=== Structural fire protection ===
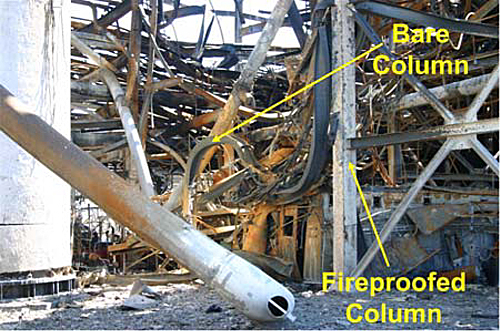
Investigation photo showing the destruction of the non-fireproofed columns vs. columns that were fireproofed.

On the structure that collapsed, only three of the four supporting columns were covered with a fireproofing material. The columns that supported the pressure relief valves and emergency vent piping had no fireproofing at all. The columns that were not fireproofed bent in the ensuing fire while the fireproof columns were found upright during the after-accident investigation. The American Petroleum Institute issued a recommendation in July 1988 that steel supporting pressure relief and emergency flare lines should be fireproofed. The recommendation had been issued prior to construction of the Olefins II Unit.

=== Isolation of equipment ===
The operators working in the unit at the time of the incident were unable to reach manual shut-off valves that would have isolated the damaged section from a fuel source. A remotely operated shut-off valve was located between the damaged section and the storage tanks but not between the damaged section and the distillation column. In addition, the pumps were controlled from a local control station that was also inaccessible. The pumps were eventually shut down from the central control building but there was not a remote shutdown control for the pumps in the central control room. Isolating the damaged section via a remotely operated valve upstream of the pumps could have ended the incident prior to ignition of the vapor cloud and would have definitely reduced the severity of the situation.

=== Recommendations ===
The CSB recommended that Formosa Plastics needed to revise policies for their hazard analysis to have a better evaluation of vehicle impact hazards, fireproofing and prevention or minimization of hazardous material releases. CSB also recommended fire resistant clothing for workers in any units at the Point Comfort complex that had a risk of flash fires.

In addition to Formosa Plastics, the safety board had recommendations for Kellogg, Brown and Root, the designers of the Olefins II unit. They had also had designed the original Olefin unit (Unit I) and had sold the same design plan to Formosa for Unit II as well as to other companies. The plant design had never been updated to account for new recommendations and requirements for safety standards. The safety board recommended that KBR advise all owners of similar plant designs of the potential problems and that KBR review all of its existing plant designs for safety updates before selling them to future clients.

=== Penalties ===
The Occupational Safety and Health Administration found that Formosa Plastics had committed one willful violation of "failure to provide employees with flame resistant clothing for protection against flash fire hazards". OSHA also cited Formosa for 13 other violations and fined the company $148,000.
