= Texas State Highway 35 =

State highway in Texas, United States

State Highway 35

Route information
- Maintained by TxDOT
- Length: 206.5 mi (332.3 km)
- Existed: 1917–present

Major junctions
- South end: I-37 / US 181 / SH 286 near Corpus Christi
- US 87 in Port Lavaca; SH 6 in Alvin; Beltway 8 / Sam Houston Tollway in Houston; I-610 in Houston
- North end: I-45 in Houston

Location
- Country: United States
- State: Texas

Highway system
- Highways in Texas; Interstate; US; State; Former; Toll; Loops; Spurs; FM/RM; Park; Rec
← I-35W	→ SH 36
← Loop 5	Spur 5	→ FM 5

State Highway 35 (SH 35) is a 206.5-mile (332.3 km) state highway near the southeastern edge of Texas, United States, that is maintained by the Texas Department of Transportation (TxDOT). It runs primarily south–north, paralleling the Gulf of Mexico for much of its length, from a junction with Interstate 37 in Corpus Christi to Interstate 45 in southeastern Houston.

== Route description ==
The southern terminus of SH 35 is at an interchange with Interstate 37 (I-37) near downtown Corpus Christi, concurrent with U.S. Route 181 (US 181). The two highways run as a freeway near Corpus Christi Bay before crossing Nueces Bay on the Corpus Christi Harbor Bridge and entering Portland. In Gregory, the two routes separate, with US 181 traveling towards Sinton, and the freeway segment of SH 35 ends shortly thereafter. After crossing FM 136, SH 35 runs eastward to Aransas Pass before turning towards the northeast. In Rockport, SH 35 runs as a divided expressway. After passing through Fulton, the highway crosses Copano Bay. SH 35 runs along the western edge of the Aransas National Wildlife Refuge before entering Refugio County. In Calhoun County, SH 35 has a junction with US 87 in Port Lavaca before crossing Lavaca Bay. The route then runs east to Palacios before turning north toward Blessing, where it resumes its northeasterly trajectory toward Bay City and Angleton. From here, SH 35 takes a turn to the north-northwest toward Alvin before heading north through Pearland and crossing the Sam Houston Tollway (Beltway 8) into Houston. SH 35 then crosses I-610 before reaching its northern terminus at I-45.

== History ==
SH 35 was originally proposed on November 19, 1917 as a route from Paris to Houston. On September 17, 1918, the section of the road from Liberty to Houston was cancelled (as it overlapped SH 12), and the road was rerouted south to Anahuac. On January 20, 1919, the highway was rerouted through Coldspring, Cleveland, and Humble to end in Houston, while the old route was replaced by the new SH 35A. On August 21, 1923, the northern half of the highway had been renumbered as SH 49, with the new northern end now going east to the Louisiana state line. On November 14, 1927, it was extended to Alvin. On April 10, 1934, it had been extended southwest along cancelled SH 58 and SH 57, ending in Gregory. SH 35 Spur was designated from 35 to the Retrieve Prison Farm. This SH 35 Spur was cancelled on July 15, 1935. On February 21, 1938, a new SH 35 Spur was designated to Danbury, as SH 35 was rerouted to bypass Danbury. On September 26, 1939, the section north of Houston was removed when it was renumbered as U.S. Highway 59 and U.S. Highway 84. SH 35 Spur was renumbered as Spur 28. On October 5, 1972, SH 35 was extended to Corpus Christi along US 181. On January 15, 1986, an Angleton bypass opened, with the old route becoming Loop 558. On February 25, 1987, SH 35 was rerouted back over Loop 558, and the bypass became Loop 558 instead (now FM 523). On April 27, 1995, another bypass opened, so that SH 35 no longer goes through Aransas Pass or Rockport. On March 29, 2007, an Old Ocean bypass opened, with the old route becoming Loop 419 (now Spur 419).

SH 35A was a proposed spur route off SH 35 designated on March 18, 1918, with a route splitting off at Livingston, and travelling west to New Waverly. On January 20, 1919, the section of SH 35A south of Coldspring was cancelled, and the section north of Coldspring became the main route. The section of SH 35 from Livingston via Liberty to Anahuac was routed through Devers and was renamed SH 35A. On August 21, 1923, the section from Anahuac to Devers was renumbered as SH 61, and the section north of Devers was cancelled. By 1928, the Livingston to Liberty section was restored as SH 132. By 1933, that became a portion of SH 146.

SH 35B was a spur of SH 35 designated on November 27, 1922 from Jefferson to the Louisiana state line. On August 21, 1923, this was renumbered as SH 49.

An overlap of SH 35 with the Gulf Freeway was constructed in the 1980s. This portion extends from Spur 5 to Dowling Street (now Emancipation Avenue), a distance of about 1.6 miles (2.6 km). This section contains three elevated lanes in each direction (briefly four southbound lanes near the southern terminus). This overlap section is 22 lanes wide, including mainlanes, feeder roads, and a reversible HOV lane.

== Future ==
State Highway Spur 5
- Location: Houston
- Length: 2.929 mi (4.714 km)
- Existed: 1998–present

In Houston, SH 35 is Telephone Road and Reveille Street from its northern terminus at I-45. An upgrade of the facility (in a slightly different corridor) to freeway standards is planned, tentatively named the Alvin Freeway. As of 2006, only 1.3 miles (2.1 km) had been built, under the sign Spur 5 (constructed between 1996–99; officially opened September 1999; designated 1998). However, the mainlanes extend less than half a mile south of Interstate 45 adjacent to the University of Houston campus.

In early 2023, TxDOT unveiled construction bids for the first phase of the project, which will extend Spur 5 from its current southern terminus at US 90 Alt (Old Spanish Trail) to Griggs Road, just north of I-610. Phase 2 of the project will extend the freeway from Griggs Road to Dixie Drive. The estimated cost for the entire project is $366 million.

Exit list (State Highway Spur 5)

The entire route is in Houston, Harris County.

mi	km	Exit	Destinations	Notes
			Griggs Road, Long Drive	
			US 90 Alt. (Old Spanish Trail)	Current southern terminus; at-grade intersection
			Wheeler Street	Current at-grade intersection
			University Drive	Current at-grade intersection
			I-45 south / Elgin Street – Galveston, Hobby Airport	Current southern terminus of freeway; no northbound entrance
			I-45 north – Dallas	Northbound exit and southbound entrance; freeway begins to run parallel to I-45; I-45 exit 44B southbound
			Scott Street – Texas Southern University	Northbound exit and southbound entrance
			I-69 / US 59 / SH 288 south – Victoria, Cleveland, Lake Jackson, Freeport	Northern terminus; northbound exit and southbound entrance; I-69 exits 129A-B
1.000 mi = 1.609 km; 1.000 km = 0.621 mi: Incomplete access

== Junction list ==
All exits are unnumbered.

County	Location	mi	km	Destinations	Notes
Nueces	Corpus Christi			SH 286 south (Crosstown Expressway)	Southern end of US 181 concurrency
Nueces	Corpus Christi			Downtown / SEA District / Staples Street	Southbound exit and northbound entrance
Nueces	Corpus Christi			I-37 north – San Antonio, Airport	Southbound exit and northbound entrance
Nueces	Corpus Christi			Harbor Bridge Project over Corpus Christi Channel	
Nueces	Corpus Christi			Burleson Street - Joe Fulton Int'l Trade Corridor	Southbound exit and northbound entrance
Nueces	Corpus Christi			Beach Avenue	
Nueces Bay				Nueces Bay Causeway	
San Patricio	Portland			Indian Point Park	
San Patricio	Portland			Frontage Road	Southbound exit and entrance
San Patricio	Portland			FM 893 (Moore Avenue)	no direct southbound exit (signed at FM 2986)
San Patricio	Portland			FM 2986 (Wildcat Drive)	
San Patricio	Portland			Lang Road	No northbound entrance
San Patricio	Portland			FM 3239 (Buddy Ganem Drive) / Broadway Boulevard	
San Patricio				Gregory	Northbound exit only
San Patricio	Gregory			US 181 north – Sinton	Northern end of US 181 concurrency; northbound exit and southbound entrance
San Patricio	Gregory			FM 3284 (Gregory Street)	Southbound exit and northbound entrance
San Patricio	Gregory			SH 361 south / US 181 north (via Spur 202) – Ingleside, Port Aransas, Sinton	No northbound entrance
San Patricio	Gregory			FM 136 – Bayside, Woodsboro	North end of freeway
San Patricio				FM 3512 south – Ingleside	
San Patricio				Bus. SH 35-L north – Aransas Pass	Interchange; northbound exit and southbound entrance
San Patricio	Aransas Pass			FM 1069 – Ingleside	Interchange; no northbound exit
Aransas				SH 188 – Sinton	Interchange
Aransas	Rockport			FM 1069 (Market Street) – Rockport	Interchange
Aransas	Rockport			FM 2165 – Rockport	Interchange
Aransas	Rockport			FM 3036 west	Southern end of FM 3036 concurrency
Aransas	Rockport			Bus. SH 35-L south / FM 3036 east – Rockport	Northern end of FM 3036 concurrency
Aransas				Loop 1781 south	Prior to 2011, FM 1781
Aransas	Lamar			PR 13 east – Goose Island State Park	
Refugio				FM 774 – Refugio, Austwell	
Refugio				FM 1684 east	
Refugio				SH 239 south – Austwell	Southern end of SH 239 concurrency
Refugio	Tivoli			SH 239 north – Goliad	Northern end of SH 239 concurrency
Calhoun				SH 185 south – Seadrift, Port O'Connor	Southern end of SH 185 concurrency
Calhoun				SH 185 north – Victoria	Northern end of SH 185 concurrency
Calhoun				FM 1679 north	
Calhoun				FM 2235 south	
Calhoun				FM 2541 south	
Calhoun				FM 2433 – Victoria, Indianola	
Calhoun	Port Lavaca			US 87 – Victoria, Port Lavaca	
Calhoun	Port Lavaca			FM 3084 west (Half League Road)	
Calhoun	Port Lavaca			FM 1090 (Virginia Street)	
Calhoun	Port Lavaca			SH 238 south – Port Lavaca, Seadrift	
Calhoun	Point Comfort			FM 1593 – Lolita, Matagorda Bay	
Calhoun				FM 2143 east	
Jackson				SH 172 – La Ward	
Jackson				FM 1862 north – Blessing	
Jackson				FM 3280 south	
Matagorda	Palacios			Bus. SH 35-H north – Palacios	
Matagorda	Palacios			Bus. SH 35-H south – Palacios	
Matagorda				FM 2853 north	
Matagorda				FM 521 north – Simpsonville	
Matagorda	Blessing			FM 2853 south	
Matagorda	Blessing			FM 616 west – La Ward	
Matagorda	Blessing			SH 71 west – El Campo	
Matagorda	Elmaton			FM 1095 south – Simpsonville	
Matagorda	Markham			FM 1468 south	Southern end of FM 1468 concurrency
Matagorda	Markham			FM 1468 north – Markham	Northern end of FM 1468 concurrency
Matagorda				Colorado River Turnaround	Interchange
Matagorda	Bay City			SH 60 – Wharton, Matagorda	
Matagorda	Bay City			FM 2668 south	
Matagorda	Bay City			FM 457 east – Cedar Lane	
Matagorda	Van Vleck			FM 2540 south	
Matagorda				FM 1728 north – Pledger	
Brazoria				Loop 419 east – Old Ocean	
Brazoria	Old Ocean			FM 524 north – Danciger	Southern end of FM 524 concurrency
Brazoria				Loop 419 west – Old Ocean	
Brazoria				FM 524 south – Sweeny	Northern end of FM 524 concurrency
Brazoria				FM 1459 – Sweeny	
Brazoria				Bus. SH 35-E north – West Columbia	
Brazoria	West Columbia			SH 36 – Rosenberg, Freeport	
Brazoria	West Columbia			Bus. SH 35-E south (17th Street)	
Brazoria	West Columbia			FM 2851 north – Varner-Hogg Plantation	
Brazoria	Bailey's Prairie			FM 521 south – Brazoria	Southern end of FM 521 concurrency
Brazoria	Bailey's Prairie			FM 521 north – Rosharon	Northern end of FM 521 concurrency
Brazoria	Angleton			SH 288 (Nolan Ryan Expressway) – Houston, Freeport	
Brazoria	Angleton			Loop 274 (Hancock Street)	
Brazoria	Angleton			Bus. SH 288-B – Houston, Lake Jackson	
Brazoria	Angleton			FM 523 (Highway 35 Bypass) – Freeport	
Brazoria				Spur 28 south – Danbury	
Brazoria				FM 2917 south	
Brazoria	Alvin			FM 2403 south	
Brazoria	Alvin			Bus. SH 35-C north – Alvin	
Brazoria	Alvin			FM 1462 west	
Brazoria	Alvin			SH 6 – Sugar Land, Galveston	Interchange
Brazoria	Alvin			FM 517 (Dickinson Road) – League City	
Brazoria	Alvin			FM 528 (Friendswood Road) – Friendswood, Webster	
Brazoria	Alvin			Bus. SH 35-C south – Alvin	Interchange
Brazoria				FM 2351 north – Friendswood	
Brazoria	Pearland			FM 518 – Friendswood	
Harris	Houston			Beltway 8 (Frontage Road) / Sam Houston Tollway	
Harris	Houston			I-610 (South Loop Freeway) to I-45 south (Gulf Freeway) – Galveston	I-610 exit 32B; interchange; northbound entrance from I-45 closed until April 2018
Harris	Houston			I-45 north (Gulf Freeway) – Downtown Houston	I-45 exit 40 southbound; interchange; southbound exit and northbound entrance
1.000 mi = 1.609 km; 1.000 km = 0.621 mi: Concurrency terminus; Incomplete access

== Business routes ==
SH 35 has four business routes and one former business route.

=== Alvin business loop ===
Business State Highway 35-C
- Location: Alvin
- Length: 4.146 mi (6.672 km)
- Existed: 1990–present

Business State Highway 35-C (Bus. SH 35-C), formerly Loop 409, is a 4.146-mile-long (6.672 km) business loop that runs through Alvin. The road was bypassed on April 1, 1965, by SH 35 and designated Loop 409. The road was redesignated as Business SH 35-C on June 21, 1990.

=== West Columbia business loop ===
Business State Highway 35-E
- Location: West Columbia
- Length: 2.011 mi (3.236 km)
- Existed: 1998–present

Business State Highway 35-E (Bus. SH 35-E) is a 2.011-mile-long (3.236 km) business loop that runs through West Columbia. The route was created in 1998 when SH 35 was rerouted north and west of town.

=== Palacios business loop ===
Business State Highway 35-H
- Location: Palacios
- Length: 3.648 mi (5.871 km)
- Existed: 1990–present

Business State Highway 35-H (Bus SH 35-H), formerly Loop 141, is a 3.648-mile-long (5.871 km) business loop that runs through Palacios. The road was bypassed on September 21, 1944 by SH 35 and designated Loop 141. The road was redesignated as Business SH 35-H on June 21, 1990.

=== Rockport–Aransas Pass business loop ===
Business State Highway 35-L
- Location: Aransas County
- Length: 16.083 mi (25.883 km)
- Existed: 1990–present

Business State Highway 35-L (Bus. SH 35-L), formerly Loop 70, is a 16.083-mile-long (25.883 km) business loop that runs through Rockport. The road was created in 1939 when SH 35 was rerouted south and east of town. The route was redesignated as Business SH 35-L on June 21, 1990. On April 27, 1995 the route was extended north to SH 35 and FM 3036 and south to SH 35 in Aransas Pass over former SH 35 and was also rerouted in Rockport with the old route redesignated as Loop 70.

=== Former Aransas Pass business loop ===
Business State Highway 35-M
- Location: Aransas Pass
- Length: 1.387 mi (2.232 km)
- Existed: 1990–1995

Business State Highway 35-M (Bus. SH 35-M), formerly Loop 81, was a 1.387-mile-long (2.232 km) business loop that ran through Aransas Pass. The route was created in 1939 when SH 35 was rerouted in the city. The route was redesignated as Business SH 35-M on June 21, 1990, but was redesignated as Loop 90 on April 27, 1995.

== See also ==
- List of state highways in Texas
- Copano Bay Fishing Pier
