= Hope High School (Port Lavaca, Texas) =

Location
- 900 N Virginia St; Port Lavaca, Texas 77979; United States; 28.605271°N 96.641372°W

Information
- Type: Public high school
- School district: Calhoun County Independent School District
- Principal: Dwana Finster
- Teaching staff: 5.90 (FTE)
- Grades: 9-12
- Enrollment: 30 (2023–2024)
- Student to teacher ratio: 5.08
- Color
- Website: Official Website

Hope High School is a secondary alternative school located in Port Lavaca, Texas, in the Calhoun County Independent School District. The school serves all of CCISD, including the city of Port Lavaca and Calhoun County. For the 2024-2025 school year, the school was given an "A" by the Texas Education Agency.

Hope High School is an alternative school and does not have school team sports; however, it does offer physical education, also known as PE.
