= Texas State Highway 238 =

State highway in Texas

State Highway 238
- SH 238, highlighted in red

Route information
- Maintained by TxDOT
- Length: 17.676 mi (28.447 km)
- Existed: 1936–present

Major junctions
- South end: SH 185 in Seadrift
- US 87 in Port Lavaca
- North end: SH 35 in Port Lavaca

Location
- Country: United States
- State: Texas

Highway system
- Highways in Texas; Interstate; US; State; Former; Toll; Loops; Spurs; FM/RM; Park; Rec
← SH 237	→ SH 239

State Highway 238 (SH 238) is a state highway running from Port Lavaca south to Seadrift. The route was designated on December 22, 1936, from Port Lavaca to Inez. On September 26, 1939, it was extended to Seadrift, replacing a portion of SH 27. On May 29, 1941, the section north of Port Lavaca was cancelled. On November 13, 1980, SH 238 was extended over Spur 346 from US 87 to SH 35.

== Junction list ==
The entire route is in Calhoun County.

Location	mi	km	Destinations	Notes
Seadrift			SH 185	Southern terminus at intersection of SH 185 and Railroad Avenue; South end of SH 185 overlap
			SH 185	North end of SH 185 overlap
			FM 1289	
			SH 316	
			FM 2541	
			FM 2433	
Port Lavaca			FM 1090	
Port Lavaca			FM 1090	
Port Lavaca			US 87 north	Southern terminus of US 87
Port Lavaca			SH 35	
1.000 mi = 1.609 km; 1.000 km = 0.621 mi: Concurrency terminus
