= Alamo Beach, Texas =

- Unincorporated community Census designated place
- Location within Texas Location within the United States
- Coordinates: 28°34′24″N 96°33′56″W
- Country: United States
- State: Texas
- County: Calhoun

Area
  - Total: 0.88 sq mi (2.29 km^{2})
  - Land: 0.76 sq mi (1.96 km^{2})
  - Water: 0.13 sq mi (0.33 km^{2})
- Elevation: 10 ft (3.0 m)

Population (2020)
  - Total: 254
- Time zone: UTC-6 (Central (CST))
  - Summer (DST): UTC-5 (CDT)
- GNIS feature ID: 2805751

Alamo Beach is an unincorporated community and census-designated place (CDP) in Calhoun County, Texas, United States. It was first listed as a CDP in the 2020 census with a population of 254. It is located just north of the junction of Farm Roads 2717 and 2760, approximately two miles southeast of Port Lavaca and northwest of Magnolia Beach. The community is situated along the waterfront of Lavaca Bay. It is part of the Victoria, Texas Metropolitan Statistical Area.

== History ==
The settlement was established during the first decade of the twentieth century and had a post office from 1907 to 1915.

== Education ==
Public education in the community of Alamo Beach is provided by the Calhoun County Independent School District (CCISD).

== Demographics ==
Historical population
Census	Pop.	Note	%±
2020	254		—
U.S. Decennial Census; 1850–1900 1910; 1920 1930 1940; 1950 1960 1970; 1980 1990 2000; 2010 2020

Alamo Beach first appeared as a census designated place in the 2020 U.S. census.

=== 2020 census ===
Alamo Beach, Texas – Racial and ethnic composition Note: the US Census treats Hispanic/Latino as an ethnic category. This table excludes Latinos from the racial categories and assigns them to a separate category. Hispanics/Latinos may be of any race.
Race / Ethnicity (NH = Non-Hispanic)	Pop 2020	% 2020
White alone (NH)	187	73.62%
Black or African American alone (NH)	2	0.79%
Native American or Alaska Native alone (NH)	1	0.39%
Asian alone (NH)	0	0.00%
Native Hawaiian or Pacific Islander alone (NH)	0	0.00%
Other race alone (NH)	5	1.97%
Mixed race or Multiracial (NH)	12	4.72%
Hispanic or Latino (any race)	47	18.50%
Total	254	100.00%
