= Texas State Highway 185 =

State highway in Texas

State Highway 185
- SH 185, highlighted in red

Route information
- Maintained by TxDOT
- Length: 51.556 mi (82.971 km)
- Existed: by 1939–present

Major junctions
- West end: I-69 BL / Bus. US 59 in Victoria
- US 87 in Victoria; Future I-69 / US 59 in Victoria
- East end: Maple Street in Port O'Connor, Texas

Location
- Country: United States
- State: Texas

Highway system
- Highways in Texas; Interstate; US; State; Former; Toll; Loops; Spurs; FM/RM; Park; Rec
← SH 184	→ SH 186

State Highway 185 (SH 185) is a Texas state highway that runs from Victoria southeast to the Gulf of Mexico at Port O'Connor.

== History ==
The route was originally designated on January 20, 1932 from Seadrift northwest to a connection with then-SH 57 (now SH 35), but was erroneously omitted from the state highway log and therefore was unnumbered. On November 30, 1932, this highway was added to the state highway log and numbered SH 185. On September 26, 1939, the route was extended to Port O'Connor, replacing a portion of SH 29. On October 16, 1951, an extension of SH 185 to Victoria was signed, but not designated, along FM 404. On August 29, 1990, the extension to Victoria was officially designated, replacing FM 404.

== Major intersections ==
County	Location	mi	km	Destinations	Notes
Victoria	Victoria			Bus. US 59	Western terminus
Victoria	Victoria			US 87	
Victoria	Victoria			Future I-69 / US 59 – Houston, Goliad	Exit 11 on I-69/US 59; U.S. 59 is the future Interstate 69.
Victoria				FM 1432	
Victoria				FM 1686	
Victoria	Bloomington			FM 616	
Calhoun				SH 35	
Calhoun				SH 238	
Calhoun				FM 1289	
Calhoun	Port O'Connor			Maple Street	Eastern terminus
1.000 mi = 1.609 km; 1.000 km = 0.621 mi
