= Victoria metropolitan area, Texas =

Metropolitan statistical area

Victoria metropolitan area
- Metropolitan Statistical Area
- Victoria, TX MSA
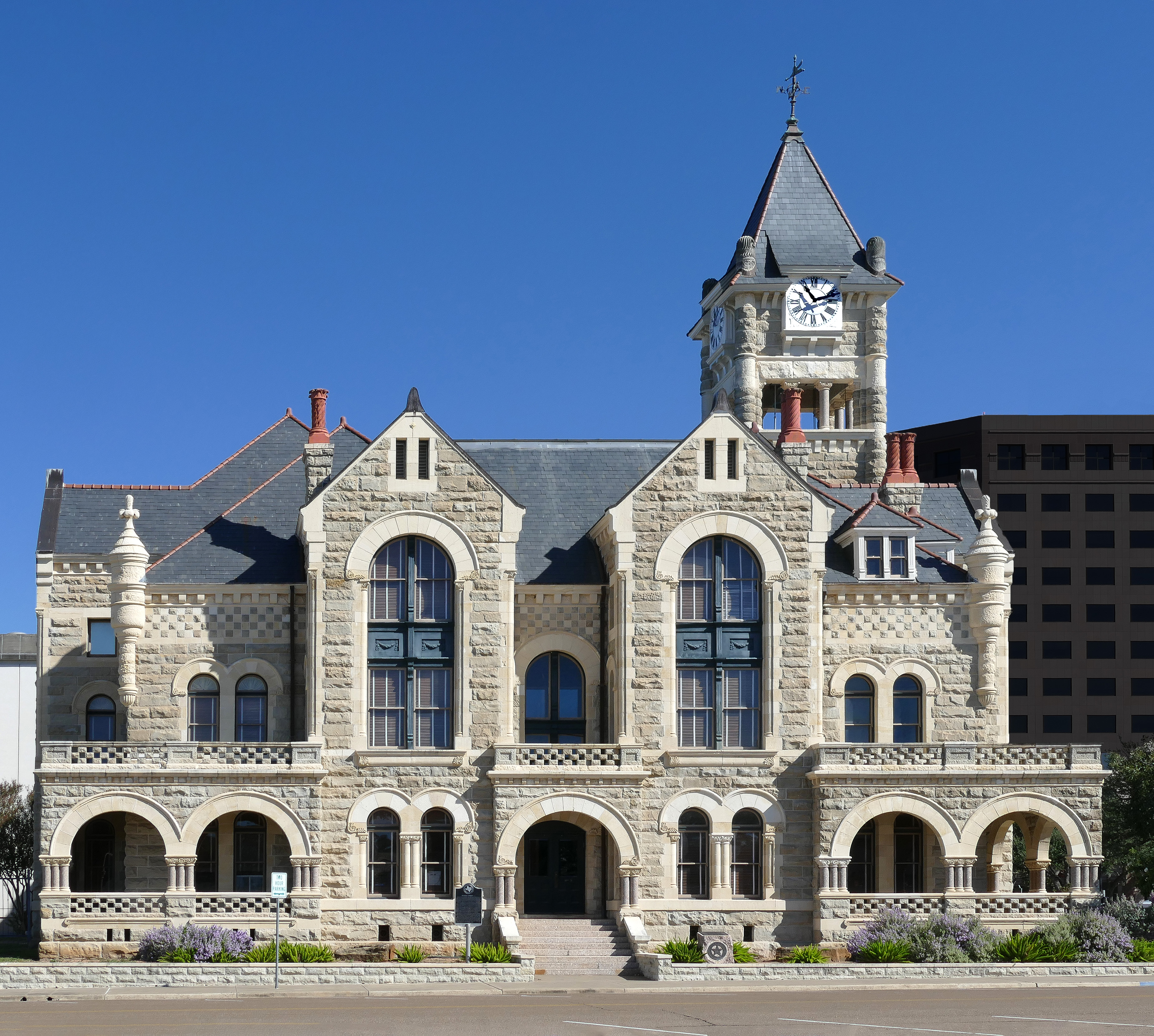
- Old Victoria Courthouse
Interactive Map of Victoria–Port Lavaca, TX CSA
City of Victoria
Victoria, TX MSA
Port Lavaca, TX µSA
- Country: United States
- State: Texas
- Largest city: Victoria
- Other cities: Port Lavaca
- Time zone: UTC-6 (CST)
  - Summer (DST): UTC-5 (CDT)

The Victoria Metropolitan Statistical Area, as defined by the United States Census Bureau, is an area consisting of three counties in the Coastal Bend region of Texas, anchored by the city of Victoria. The area is sometimes referred to as the Golden Crescent Region, though this term is sometimes used to refer to a larger area than just these 3 counties. As of the 2000 census, the MSA had a population of 111,663 (though a July 1, 2009 estimate placed the population at 115,396).

== Counties ==
- Calhoun
- Goliad
- Victoria

== Communities ==
- Incorporated places
  - Goliad
  - Point Comfort
  - Port Lavaca
  - Seadrift
  - Victoria (Principal City)
- Census-designated places
  - Bloomington
  - Inez
- Unincorporated places
  - Alamo Beach
  - Berclair
  - Dacosta
  - Fannin
  - Guadalupe
  - Indianola
  - Kamey
  - Long Mott
  - Magnolia Beach
  - McFaddin
  - Nursery
  - Placedo
  - Port O'Connor
  - Raisin
  - Telferner
  - Weesatche

== Demographics ==
As of the census of 2000, there were 111,163 people, 40,157 households, and 29,741 families residing within the MSA. The racial makeup of the MSA was 75.44% White, 5.53% African American, 0.52% Native American, 1.20% Asian, 0.04% Pacific Islander, 15.05% from other races, and 2.21% from two or more races. Hispanic or Latino of any race were 39.27% of the population.

The median income for a household in the MSA was $36,261, and the median income for a family was $41,596. Males had a median income of $34,132 versus $20,344 for females. The per capita income for the MSA was $17,543.

== See also ==
- Texas census statistical areas
- Golden Crescent Regional Planning Commission
