= National Register of Historic Places listings in Calhoun County, Texas =

Location of Calhoun County in Texas

This is a list of the National Register of Historic Places listings in Calhoun County, Texas.

This is intended to be a complete list of properties listed on the National Register of Historic Places in Calhoun County, Texas. There is one property listed on the National Register in the county. A former property has been removed from the register.

This National Park Service list is complete through NPS recent listings posted March 21, 2025.

== Current listings ==
The locations of National Register properties may be seen in a mapping service provided.

	Name on the Register	Image	Date listed	Location	City or town	Description
1	La Salle Monument	La Salle Monument	July 27, 2018 (#100002757)	TX 316 at Blind Bayou; 28°31′38″N 96°30′31″W	Indianola	
2	Matagorda Island Lighthouse	Matagorda Island Lighthouse	September 18, 1984 (#84001624)	Matagorda Island; 28°20′16″N 96°25′27″W	Port O'Connor	

== Former listings ==
	Name on the Register	Image	Date listed	Date removed	Location	City or town	Description
1	A. C. Louwien Bakery		August 9, 1984 (#84001617)	December 3, 1992	223 Main Street; 28°36′57″N 96°37′30″W	Port Lavaca	

== See also ==
- National Register of Historic Places listings in Texas
- Recorded Texas Historic Landmarks in Calhoun County
