= Halfmoon Reef Light =

Lighthouse in Texas, United States

Halfmoon Reef Lighthouse
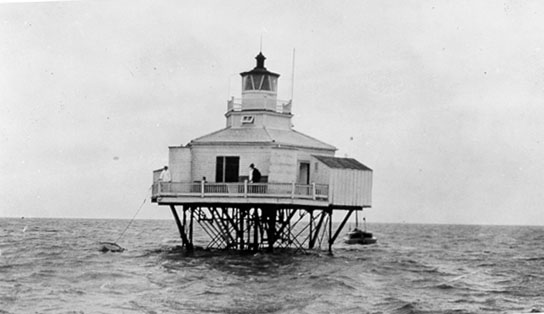
- Location: Port Lavaca, Texas
- Coordinates: 28°38′12.8″N 96°37′2.2″W

Tower
- Foundation: Iron piles
- Construction: Wood
- Height: 20 feet (6.1 m)
- Shape: Hexagonal
- Markings: White with green trim

Light
- First lit: 1858
- Deactivated: 1942
- Range: 12 nautical miles (22 km; 14 mi)
- Characteristic: Fixed red light

The Halfmoon Reef Light (also Half Moon Reef Light) is one of the many screw-pile type lighthouses built on the Texas Gulf Coast, but the only one that still stands. To distinguish it from the nearby Matagorda Island Light it was given a red glass chimney to be used with the oil lantern to give it its red beam. Though originally constructed on the bay, the current resting place for the light is on Port Lavaca, alongside Highway 35.

== History ==
After the lighthouse on Matagorda Island was completed, residents asked the Lighthouse Board to mark reefs and channels in the actual bay. In response, the Board asked Congress in 1854 for funds to build a screw-pile lighthouse on the southern end of Halfmoon Reef on the eastern side of Matagorda Bay. After four years, seven iron pilings arrived at the reef by barge, each 25 feet (7.6 m) long. The pilings were shipped from Baltimore to Galveston on the same vessel that delivered material for the Point Bolivar Lighthouse and the Matagorda Island Lighthouse. The lighthouse was completed by the first of July, and on the same day the sixth order Fresnel lens displayed its fixed white light. However, mariners complained that the light resembled the one at Matagorda too closely, and a red glass chimney was placed over the lantern to give it an easily identified beacon.

During the Civil War, Confederates darkened its light to aid the escape of southern blockade runners. Although the war ended in 1865, the light was not relit until February 20 of 1868.

On September 17, 1875, a large hurricane struck the area destroying two other screw-pile lights in the area and devastating Indianola. Strangely, Halfmoon Reef Lighthouse suffered very little damage. In 1886 another hurricane caused damage to the lighthouse, but not much more than the previous hurricane. At this point the Lighthouse Board made the decision to deactivate the lighthouse rather than repair it, as the traffic in Matagorda Bay had begun to decline. Instead of completely demolishing the light, the Board removed the lens but left the light on the shoal as a daymark for the remaining mariners.

As the new century arrived, the traffic around Port Lavaca increased and in 1902, the light was given a fourth order red lens lantern as a replacement. In 1911, repairs were made to heighten and reinforce the roof. In 1935, the position of assistant keeper was abolished, and an eight-day lantern was installed permitting the keeper to live ashore. For the next several years the lighthouse braved more violent storms. Though in 1942, a large hurricane ripped off the walkway and weakened the pilings. The Coast Guard, the new owners of the lighthouse, decided to sell the light instead of repairing it. Bill Bauer and Henry Smith eventually purchased the lighthouse and planned to use it as a headquarters for their dredging business at Point Comfort.

The lighthouse was placed on a barge by a crane and carried up to Point Comfort. In 1978 Bauer gave the lighthouse to the Calhoun County Historic Commission and transported to its current location. The following year the lighthouse was repaired as an Eagle Scout community project. In 1985, the lighthouse was revealed as a Texas Historical Marker.

== Location ==
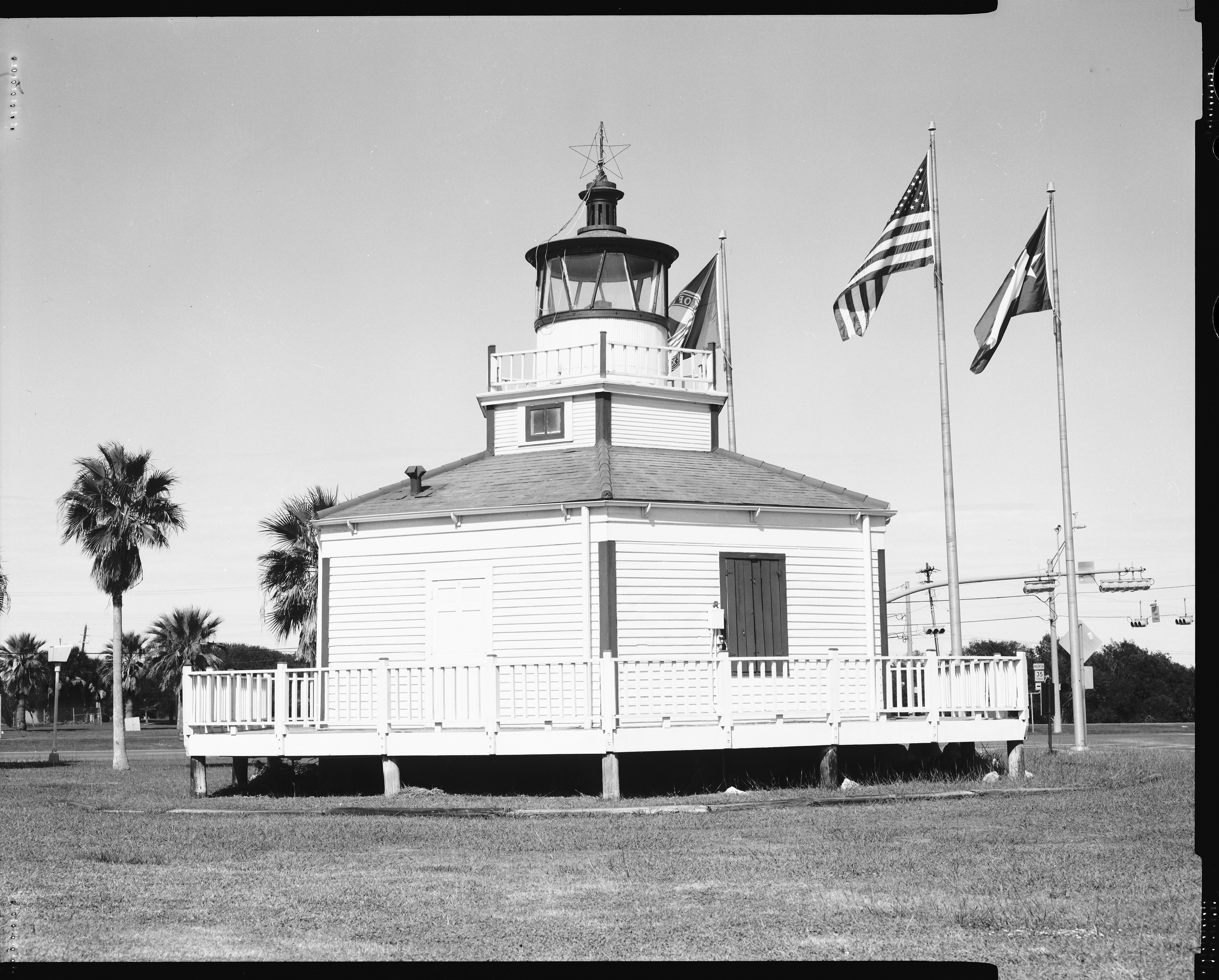
Recent image of the lighthouse in Port Lavaca

The lighthouse is located on the intersection of Broadway Street and SH35 in Port Lavaca. It is near the West end of the causeway over Lavaca Bay. The grounds are open, but to gain entrance one must visit the Bauer Community Center.
