= Magnolia Beach, Texas =

- Census-designated place
- Location within Texas Location within the United States
- Coordinates: 28°33′25″N 96°32′47″W
- Country: United States
- State: Texas
- County: Calhoun

Area
  - Total: 1.02 sq mi (2.65 km^{2})
  - Land: 1.02 sq mi (2.64 km^{2})
  - Water: 0.0039 sq mi (0.01 km^{2})
- Elevation: 7 ft (2.1 m)

Population (2020)
  - Total: 217
- Time zone: UTC-6 (Central (CST))
  - Summer (DST): UTC-5 (CDT)
- GNIS feature ID: 2805752

Magnolia Beach is an unincorporated community and census-designated place (CDP) in Calhoun County, Texas, United States. It was first listed as a CDP in the 2020 census with a population of 217. It is located along the waterfront of Lavaca Bay, southeast of Alamo Beach. The community is part of the Victoria, Texas Metropolitan Statistical Area.

== History ==
The settlement's history dates back to the late 19th century. The word Magnolia was added to the beach name to suggest the beauty of the setting since magnolias grow locally. Today, Magnolia Beach is a lightly populated, but developing bay front community.

== Demographics ==
Historical population
Census	Pop.	Note	%±
2020	217		—
U.S. Decennial Census; 1850–1900 1910; 1920 1930 1940; 1950 1960 1970; 1980 1990 2000; 2010 2020

Magnolia Beach first appeared as a census designated place in the 2020 U.S. census.

=== 2020 census ===
Magnolia Beach CDP, Texas – Racial and ethnic composition Note: the US Census treats Hispanic/Latino as an ethnic category. This table excludes Latinos from the racial categories and assigns them to a separate category. Hispanics/Latinos may be of any race.
Race / Ethnicity (NH = Non-Hispanic)	Pop 2020	% 2020
White alone (NH)	178	82.03%
Black or African American alone (NH)	2	0.92%
Native American or Alaska Native alone (NH)	0	0.00%
Asian alone (NH)	0	0.00%
Native Hawaiian or Pacific Islander alone (NH)	0	0.00%
Other race alone (NH)	6	2.76%
Mixed race or Multiracial (NH)	6	2.76%
Hispanic or Latino (any race)	25	11.52%
Total	217	100.00%

== Education ==
The Calhoun County Independent School District (CCISD) provides public education in the Magnolia Beach community.
