= Fort Point Light =

Fort Point Light may refer to:

- Fort Point Light (San Francisco), California, U.S.
- Fort Point Light (Maine), U.S.
- Fort Point Light (Texas), U.S.
- Fort Point Lighthouse (Nova Scotia), Canada

== See also ==
- Portsmouth Harbor Light, New Castle, New Hampshire, U.S.
