= Point Comfort, Texas =

- City
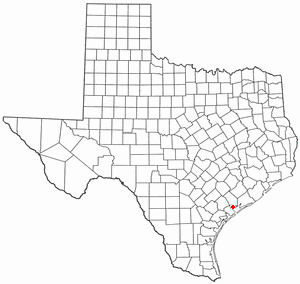
- Location of Point Comfort, Texas

- Coordinates: 28°40′17″N 96°33′33″W
- Country: United States
- State: Texas
- County: Calhoun

Area
  - Total: 1.32 sq mi (3.41 km^{2})
  - Land: 1.32 sq mi (3.41 km^{2})
  - Water: 0 sq mi (0.00 km^{2})
- Elevation: 20 ft (6.1 m)

Population (2020)
  - Total: 603
  - Density: 458/sq mi (177/km^{2})
- Time zone: UTC-6 (Central (CST))
  - Summer (DST): UTC-5 (CDT)
- ZIP code: 77978
- Area code: 361
- FIPS code: 48-58568
- GNIS feature ID: 2411451
- Website: www.cityofpointcomfort.org

Point Comfort is a city in Calhoun County, Texas, United States. It is a part of the Victoria, Texas Metropolitan Statistical Area. The population was 603 at the 2020 census.

== Geography ==
Point Comfort is located in northeastern Calhoun County on the east side of Lavaca Bay. Texas State Highway 35 passes through the community, leading southwest across the bay 7 miles (11 km) to Port Lavaca, the Calhoun County seat, and east 23 miles (37 km) to Palacios.

According to the United States Census Bureau, Point Comfort has a total area of 1.3 square miles (3.4 km^{2}), all land.

=== Climate ===
The climate in this area is characterized by hot, humid summers and generally mild to cool winters. According to the Köppen Climate Classification system, Point Comfort has a humid subtropical climate, abbreviated "Cfa" on climate maps.

Climate data for Point Comfort, Texas, 1991–2020 normals, extremes 1957–present
Month	Jan	Feb	Mar	Apr	May	Jun	Jul	Aug	Sep	Oct	Nov	Dec	Year
Record high °F (°C)	84 (29)	91 (33)	95 (35)	98 (37)	99 (37)	106 (41)	103 (39)	106 (41)	107 (42)	96 (36)	95 (35)	86 (30)	107 (42)
Mean maximum °F (°C)	76.5 (24.7)	79.5 (26.4)	81.9 (27.7)	86.7 (30.4)	90.0 (32.2)	94.1 (34.5)	95.0 (35.0)	97.2 (36.2)	94.5 (34.7)	90.5 (32.5)	83.5 (28.6)	79.3 (26.3)	98.1 (36.7)
Mean daily maximum °F (°C)	64.0 (17.8)	67.7 (19.8)	72.6 (22.6)	78.3 (25.7)	84.0 (28.9)	89.4 (31.9)	91.2 (32.9)	92.4 (33.6)	88.7 (31.5)	82.7 (28.2)	73.7 (23.2)	66.7 (19.3)	79.3 (26.3)
Daily mean °F (°C)	54.8 (12.7)	58.6 (14.8)	64.6 (18.1)	70.6 (21.4)	77.4 (25.2)	82.9 (28.3)	84.8 (29.3)	85.3 (29.6)	80.9 (27.2)	73.6 (23.1)	64.4 (18.0)	57.3 (14.1)	71.3 (21.8)
Mean daily minimum °F (°C)	45.7 (7.6)	49.4 (9.7)	56.5 (13.6)	62.9 (17.2)	70.7 (21.5)	76.4 (24.7)	78.4 (25.8)	78.2 (25.7)	73.2 (22.9)	64.5 (18.1)	55.0 (12.8)	48.0 (8.9)	63.2 (17.4)
Mean minimum °F (°C)	31.4 (−0.3)	34.6 (1.4)	38.9 (3.8)	45.7 (7.6)	56.4 (13.6)	66.8 (19.3)	71.7 (22.1)	71.3 (21.8)	60.6 (15.9)	46.6 (8.1)	38.0 (3.3)	32.0 (0.0)	28.3 (−2.1)
Record low °F (°C)	14 (−10)	18 (−8)	23 (−5)	33 (1)	44 (7)	56 (13)	59 (15)	60 (16)	40 (4)	35 (2)	26 (−3)	9 (−13)	9 (−13)
Average precipitation inches (mm)	3.11 (79)	1.84 (47)	3.20 (81)	2.61 (66)	4.25 (108)	4.85 (123)	3.15 (80)	3.42 (87)	4.82 (122)	3.65 (93)	3.57 (91)	2.92 (74)	41.39 (1,051)
Average precipitation days (≥ 0.01 in)	8.7	7.4	6.6	5.4	6.3	8.1	5.9	6.7	8.9	7.1	7.2	8.7	87.0
Source 1: NOAA
Source 2: National Weather Service

== Demographics ==
Historical population
Census	Pop.	Note	%±
1970	1,446		—
1980	1,125		−22.2%
1990	956		−15.0%
2000	781		−18.3%
2010	737		−5.6%
2020	603		−18.2%
U.S. Decennial Census

=== 2020 census ===
As of the 2020 census, Point Comfort had a population of 603, with 236 households and 140 families residing in the city. The median age was 36.6 years; 25.2% of residents were under the age of 18 and 14.4% were 65 years of age or older. For every 100 females there were 112.3 males, and for every 100 females age 18 and over there were 105.0 males age 18 and over.

As of the 2020 census, 100.0% of residents lived in urban areas, while 0.0% lived in rural areas.

As of the 2020 census, there were 236 households in Point Comfort, of which 38.6% had children under the age of 18 living in them. Of all households, 45.3% were married-couple households, 25.8% were households with a male householder and no spouse or partner present, and 22.9% were households with a female householder and no spouse or partner present. About 21.2% of all households were made up of individuals and 10.1% had someone living alone who was 65 years of age or older.

As of the 2020 census, there were 289 housing units, of which 18.3% were vacant. The homeowner vacancy rate was 0.0% and the rental vacancy rate was 8.0%.

Racial composition as of the 2020 census
Race	Number	Percent
White	397	65.8%
Black or African American	12	2.0%
American Indian and Alaska Native	2	0.3%
Asian	15	2.5%
Native Hawaiian and Other Pacific Islander	0	0.0%
Some other race	57	9.5%
Two or more races	120	19.9%
Hispanic or Latino (of any race)	245	40.6%

=== 2000 census ===
As of the 2000 census, there were 781 people, 284 households, and 214 families residing in the city. The population density was 596.8 inhabitants per square mile (230.4/km^{2}). There were 393 housing units at an average density of 300.3 per square mile (115.9/km^{2}). The racial makeup of the city was 88.99% White, 1.41% African American, 0.26% Native American, 1.79% Asian, 5.89% from other races, and 1.66% from two or more races. Hispanic or Latino of any race were 19.59% of the population.

There were 284 households, out of which 39.4% had children under the age of 18 living with them, 62.7% were married couples living together, 9.9% had a female householder with no husband present, and 24.3% were non-families. 21.1% of all households were made up of individuals, and 11.6% had someone living alone who was 65 years of age or older. The average household size was 2.73 and the average family size was 3.14.

In the city, the population was 30.2% under the age of 18, 7.2% from 18 to 24, 31.8% from 25 to 44, 17.8% from 45 to 64, and 13.1% who were 65 years of age or older. The median age was 33 years. For every 100 females, there were 94.3 males. For every 100 females age 18 and over, there were 94.6 males. The median income for a household in the city was $44,500, and the median income for a family was $49,653. Males had a median income of $35,625 versus $23,571 for females. The per capita income for the city was $19,202. About 7.5% of families and 11.8% of the population were below the poverty line, including 20.6% of those under age 18 and 8.2% of those age 65 or over.

== Education ==
Point Comfort is served by the Calhoun County Independent School District. The city was served by Point Comfort Elementary School (Point Comfort) now closed, Travis Middle School (Port Lavaca) and Calhoun High School (Port Lavaca).

== Economy ==
Point Comfort is the site of a controversial Formosa PVC plant, site of both the Formosa Plastics propylene explosion as well as large-scale waste violations that resulted in the largest citizen-led settlement of a Clean Water Act suit in the United States. In 2020, the latter controversy was portrayed in episode 12 ("Point Comfort") of the Netflix series Dirty Money. Plastic pollution continued in Lavaca Bay even after the court settlement.
