= Simpsonville =

Simpsonville may refer to:

- Simpsonville, Kentucky
- Simpsonville, Maryland
- Simpsonville, South Carolina
- Simpsonville, Texas
- Simpsonville, California, former name of Bear Valley, Mariposa County, California
