= Matagorda Island Light =

- Matagorda Island Lighthouse
- U.S. National Register of Historic Places
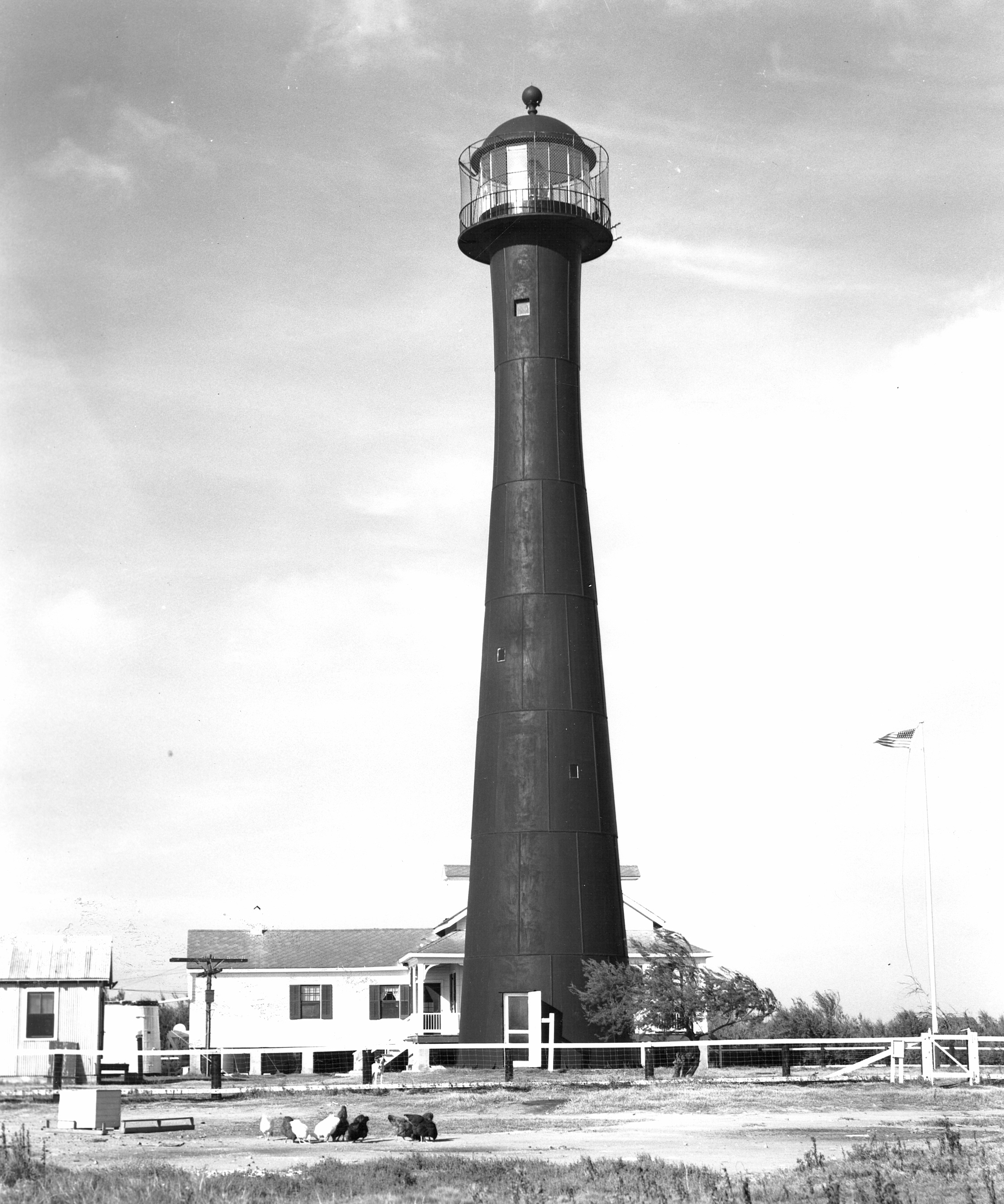
- Matagorda Island Lighthouse

- Location within Texas Location within the United States
- Nearest city: Port O'Connor, Texas
- Coordinates: 28°20′15″N 96°25′26″W
- Area: less than one acre
- Built: 1872
- Built by: U.S. Coast Guard, Lighthouse Service
- NRHP reference No.: 84001624
- Added to NRHP: September 18, 1984

The Matagorda Island Light is located on Matagorda Island in Calhoun County, in the U.S. state of Texas. Once under the jurisdiction of the United States Coast Guard, the lighthouse is now managed by the Texas Parks and Wildlife Department.

== History ==
Building of a lighthouse to guide sea-going vessels into Matagorda Bay through Pass Cavallo was authorized by the Congress of the Republic of Texas in 1845. When President James K. Polk signed the Texas Annexation documents on December 29, 1845, it became the responsibility of the United States. In 1847, the United States Congress authorized $15,090 to build the lighthouse. Legislative red tape caused a series of delays, and the contract to build the lighthouse was finally awarded to Murray and Hazlehurst of Baltimore in 1851. The new 55 feet (17 m) cast iron lighthouse became functional on December 21, 1852. Gulf storms and subsequent beach erosion caused the lighthouse to be rebuilt on higher ground. The light tower was raised 24 feet (7.3 m) in 1857 to enable the beam to be seen from a greater distance. A new lens was installed in 1859.

During the Civil War, the Confederate States Navy tried to blow up the lighthouse to keep it out of Union hands. Damage inflicted by Confederate troops necessitated rebuilding the lighthouse at a new site in 1873 at a cost of $32,000. A new iron conical tower was added, with the lens 91 feet (28 m) above sea level.

The 1886 Indianola hurricane destroyed most of the town and caused the water to rise 4 feet (1.2 m) inside the tower. The resulting structural swaying caused the lens to fall out. In 1956, the tower was automated by the United States Coast Guard, marking the first time it was not operated by human keepers.

== Renovation ==
The Texas Parks and Wildlife Department, which manages the lighthouse, installed a new rotating solar-powered marine lantern in 1999. After being out of commission since 1995, the light was relit at Midnight as the year turned over to 2000, to celebrate the new millennium. The lighthouse underwent a $1.23 million renovation, completed in 2004. The renovation was made possible by private donations from the Matagorda Island Foundation and a grant from the United States government.

== Cemetery ==
The resting place for lighthouse keepers and their families can be found near the lighthouse.

== See also ==
- List of lighthouses in Texas
- National Register of Historic Places listings in Calhoun County, Texas
