= Farm to Market Road 1459 =

State road in Brazoria County, Texas, United States

Farm to Market Road 1459

Route information
- Maintained by TxDOT
- Length: 11.240 mi (18.089 km)
- Existed: 1949–present

Major junctions
- South end: FM 524 in Sweeny
- FM 522 northeast of Sweeny; SH 35 southwest of West Columbia
- North end: FM 1301 southeast of Danciger

Location
- Country: United States
- State: Texas
- Counties: Brazoria

Highway system
- Highways in Texas; Interstate; US; State; Former; Toll; Loops; Spurs; FM/RM; Park; Rec
← FM 1458	→ FM 1460

Farm to Market Road 1459 (FM 1459) is a farm to market road in Brazoria County, Texas.

== Route description ==
FM 1459 begins at a blinking light, at the intersection of FM 524 in the heart of Sweeny. Traveling along Second Street, the highway makes two 90 degree curves: one to the northwest, passing Sweeny Community Hospital, then to the northeast, leaving town in a northerly direction. It crosses FM 522 and then SH 35 to the southwest of West Columbia. FM 1459 turns to the northwest, passing small communities such as Camp Karankawa alongside the San Bernard River, to its northern end at FM 1301 near Danciger.

== History ==
FM 1459 was designated on July 22, 1949, from SH 35 to FM 524 in Sweeny. The northern extension from SH 35 to FM 1301 occurred on June 1, 1965.

== Major intersections ==
The entire route is in Brazoria County.

Location	mi	km	Destinations	Notes
Sweeny	0.0	0.0	FM 524	Southern terminus
	3.2	5.1	FM 522	
	4.6	7.4	SH 35 – Bay City, West Columbia	
	11.3	18.2	FM 1301	Northern terminus
1.000 mi = 1.609 km; 1.000 km = 0.621 mi
