= Calhoun County Airport (Texas) =

Airport in Calhoun County, Texas, US

- IATA: none; ICAO: KPKV; FAA LID: PKV

Summary
- Airport type: Public
- Owner: County of Calhoun
- Serves: Port Lavaca, Texas
- Elevation AMSL: 32 ft (9.8 m)
- Coordinates: 28°39′15″N 096°40′53″W

Map
- Location within Texas

Runways
Direction	Length		Surface
Direction	ft	m	Surface
14/32	5,004	1,525	Asphalt
5/23	2,432	741	Turf

Statistics (2023)
- Aircraft operations: 8,700
- Based aircraft: 27
- Source: Federal Aviation Administration

Calhoun County Airport (ICAO: KPKV, FAA LID: PKV) is a county-owned public-use airport located three miles (5 km) northwest of the central business district of Port Lavaca, a city in Calhoun County, Texas, United States.

Although most U.S. airports use the same three-letter location identifier for the FAA and IATA, Calhoun County Airport is assigned PKV by the FAA but has no designation from the IATA.

== Facilities and aircraft ==
Calhoun County Airport covers an area of 200 acres (81 ha) which contains two runways: 14/32 with an asphalt pavement measuring 5,004 x 75 ft (1,525 x 23 m) and 5/23 with a turf surface measuring 2,432 x 60 ft (741 x 18 m). The airport has two concrete helipads, twenty-four-hour self-service fuel tanks with AvGas and JetA.

The only fixed-base operator at the airport is Gateway Flight Center. Flight instruction is available on the field from Gateway Flight Center, as well as full service fueling and aircraft maintenance.

For the 12-month period ending April 17th, 2023, the airport had 8,700 aircraft operations, an average of 23 per day: 83% general aviation and 17% military. At that time there were 27 aircraft based at this airport: 78% single-engine, 11% multi-engine, 7% jets, and 4% helicopter.

== See also ==
- List of airports in Texas
