= Golden Crescent Regional Planning Commission =

- Logo

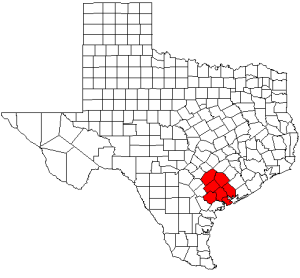
- Map of Texas highlighting counties served by the Golden Crescent Regional Planning Commission
- Formation: January 1968
- Type: Voluntary association of governments
- Region served: 6,097 sq mi (15,790 km^{2})
- Members: 7 counties

Historical population
Year	Pop.	±%
2000	183,905	—
2010	188,626	+2.6%
2020	193,239	+2.4%

The Golden Crescent Regional Planning Commission (GCRPC) is a voluntary association of cities, counties and special districts in southern Texas.

Based in Victoria, the Golden Crescent Regional Planning Commission is a member of the Texas Association of Regional Councils.

== Counties served ==
- Calhoun
- DeWitt
- Goliad
- Gonzales
- Jackson
- Lavaca
- Victoria

== Largest cities in the region ==
- Victoria
- Port Lavaca
- Gonzales
- Cuero
- Edna
- Yoakum
