= Aransas Pass Light Station =

Port Aransas Light Station
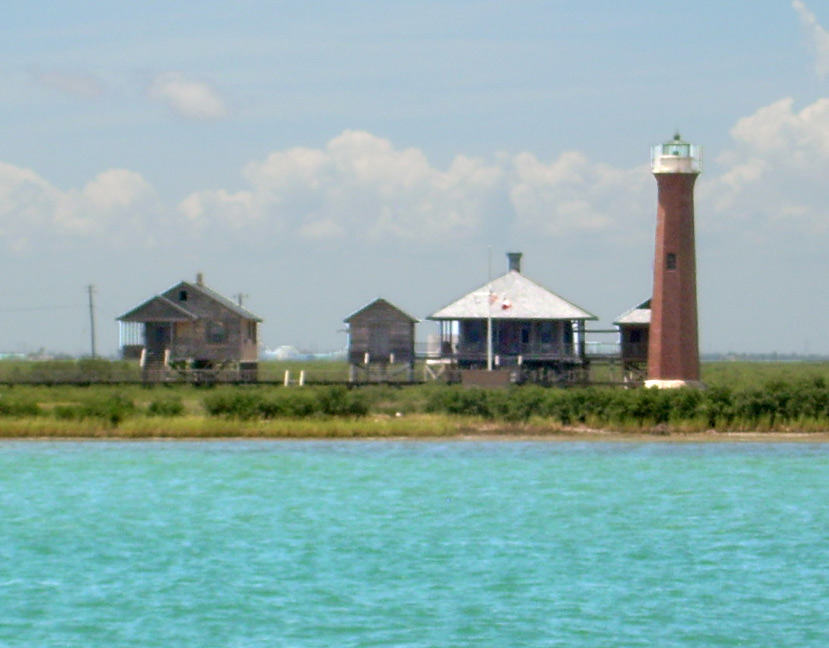
- Aransas Pass Light Station
- Location: Aransas County, Texas
- Coordinates: 27°51′51″N 97°03′23″W

Tower
- Constructed: 1856
- Foundation: Screwpile, concrete
- Construction: Red brick
- Automated: yes
- Height: 68 feet (21 m)
- Shape: Octagon
- Heritage: National Register of Historic Places listed place

Light
- First lit: 1857
- Deactivated: 1952
- Focal height: 60 feet (18 m)
- Lens: fourth order Fresnel lens
- Range: 13 miles (21 km)
- Characteristic: FF W
- Aransas Pass Light Station
- U.S. National Register of Historic Places
- U.S. Historic district
- Nearest city: Port Aransas, Texas
- Area: 23.8 acres (9.6 ha)
- Built by: U.S. Lighthouse Board
- NRHP reference No.: 77001423
- Added to NRHP: August 3, 1977

Aransas Pass Light Station also called Lydia Ann Lighthouse is an historic light station in Aransas County, Harbor Island, just outside the city limits of Port Aransas, Texas, behind San Jose and Mustang Islands, that protects a natural gulf pass to Aransas and Corpus Christi Bays.

== History ==
The Aransas Pass Light Station was one of original Texas stations of the Lighthouse Service, that was formed in 1851, and merged into the Coast Guard in 1939. The Board wrote Inspector Stevens, "…it is very important that the Sabine, Aransas Pass, Shell keys, Ship Shoal, Barataria, & Timbalier Lights should be built as soon as possible."

The lighthouse is the second oldest on the Texas coast and the oldest surviving structure in the Aransas Pass-Corpus Christi area.

When the Aransas Pass shifted, the light station was not needed and a new light was installed on Port Aransas. The Light was extinguished and the property delisted in 1952, and the property considered surplus. It was sold at auction in 1955. The channel was renamed Lydia Ann Channel and the light station Lydia Ann Light Station.

== Current ==
H-E-B CEO Charles Butt purchased the light station, hired a caretaker, remodeled and restored the structures after a hurricane, and put the automated lighthouse back into service in 1988. It is currently the only light station on the Texas coast to have an on-site caretaker and as of 2012, Rick Reichenbach is currently the second.

== See also ==
- List of lighthouses in Texas
- National Register of Historic Places listings in Aransas County, Texas
- Port Aransas, Texas
