= Rio Grande Council of Governments =

- Logo

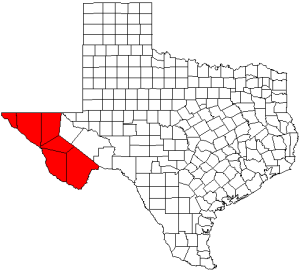
- Map of Texas highlighting counties served by the Rio Grande Council of Governments
- Formation: January 1967
- Type: Voluntary association of governments
- Region served: 22,000 sq mi (57,000 km^{2})
- Members: 7 (6 in Texas, 1 in New Mexico) counties

Historical population
Year	Pop.	±%
2000	879,000	—
2010	1,035,146	+17.8%
2020	1,108,281	+7.1%

The Rio Grande Council of Governments (RGCOG) is a voluntary association of cities, counties and special districts in West Texas and Doña Ana County, New Mexico

Based in El Paso, the Rio Grande Council of Governments is a member of the Texas Association of Regional Councils.

== Counties served ==
- Brewster
- Culberson
- El Paso
- Hudspeth
- Jeff Davis
- Presidio
- Doña Ana County, New Mexico

== Largest cities in the region ==
- El Paso
- Alamogordo, New Mexico
- Las Cruces, New Mexico
- Socorro
- Sunland Park, New Mexico
- Horizon City
- Anthony
- Presidio
