= Warren-Morris Council of Governments =

The Warren-Morris Council of Governments (COG) is the first Council of Governments established in the U.S. state of New Jersey. The Warren-Morris Council of Governments is composed of eight municipalities from Warren and Morris Counties in New Jersey, which have joined together to explore sharing of services and cooperation in other areas.

== Member Municipalities ==
Current members are the Townships of Allamuchy, Frelinghuysen, Independence, Mansfield, Washington (Warren) and Washington (Morris) and the Boroughs of Hackettstown and Washington Borough (Warren).

== Governance ==
The COG meets monthly as a confederation however the member municipalities are seeking not-for-profit status, at which time they will operate in a more permanent and formal capacity.

The COG consists of delegates appointed by the participating municipalities.

== Initiatives ==
The participating municipalities are seeking IRS "Not-for-Profit" designation and are in the process of formally incorporating under the laws of the State of New Jersey.

In July 2006, the Warren-Morris Council of Governments designated an outside consulting group as the COG's Shared Services Advisor to oversee the many aspects of coordinating the Shared Services initiatives of the participating municipalities.
