= South Western Oklahoma Development Authority =

South Western Oklahoma Development Authority
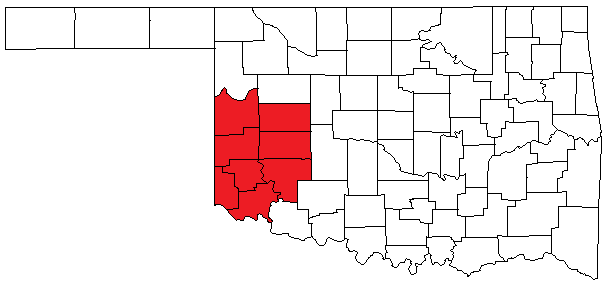
Location
General Information
Established	1971
Number of Counties	8
Area	7,027.98 sq. mi.
Population	108,895 (2000); 106,196 (2009 est.)

The South Western Oklahoma Development Authority (SWODA) is a voluntary association of municipalities, counties and conservation districts in Southwestern Oklahoma.

Based in Burns Flat, the South Western Oklahoma Development Authority is a member of the Oklahoma Association of Regional Councils (OARC).

== Counties served ==
- Beckham
- Custer
- Greer
- Harmon
- Jackson
- Kiowa
- Roger Mills
- Washita

== Largest cities in the region ==
City	Population (2008 est.)
Altus	18,912
Elk City	11,311
Weatherford	10,185
Clinton	8,768
Sayre	4,336

== Demographics ==
As of the census of 2000, there were 108,895 people, 41,801 households, and 28,759 families residing within the region. The racial makeup of the region was 82.48% White, 5.07% African American, 3.57% Native American, 0.67% Asian, 0.07% Pacific Islander, 5.39% from other races, and 2.76% from two or more races. Hispanic or Latino of any race were 9.53% of the population.

The median income for a household in the region was $27,564, and the median income for a family was $34,471. The per capita income for the region was $14,953.
