= Sabine Bank Light =

Lighthouse in Texas, United States

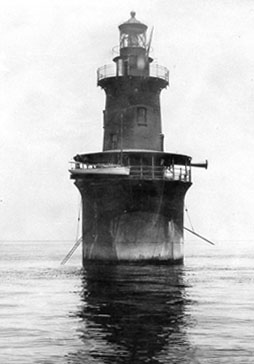
- Undated photograph of Sabine Bank Light in Texas (USCG)
- Location: off Sabine Pass, Texas
- Coordinates: 29°28′N 93°43′W

Tower
- Constructed: 1904
- Construction: caisson (foundation), iron (tower)
- Automated: 1923
- Shape: "spark plug" tower

Light
- First lit: 1906
- Deactivated: 2001
- Focal height: 22 m (72 ft)
- Lens: fourth order Fresnel lens
- Characteristic: Iso R 6s

The Sabine Bank Light is a caisson lighthouse in the Gulf of Mexico south of the mouth of the Sabine River. It is still active, though the original tower has been replaced with an automated beacon on a skeleton tower.

== History ==
Sabine Bank cuts across the channel leading into the river and thence up to Port Arthur, Texas, an important port. Although its 20 feet (6.1 m) depth represented a hazard only to larger vessels, concern was sufficient to prompt a request in 1888 by Rep. William H. Crain for a lightship to mark the shoal. This request was dismissed by the district engineers, but at the turn of the century the matter was raised again, and $40,000 was appropriated for construction of a fixed light.

A caisson light was designed, with the "sparkplug" form typical of the era. Construction began in June 1904 but was halted due to a lack of funding, leaving the caisson in place but with naught but a temporary light on the base. Construction resumed the following summer but was interrupted again by a storm in early October, during which workers took refuge in the incomplete structure. The structure was finally completed the next spring and was lit for the first time on March 15, 1906. The light was equipped with a third order Fresnel lens with a Daboll trumpet provided for a fog signal.

The station sits in open water, and its isolation was a frequent cause for complaint by keepers. Staffing was difficult. A hurricane in 1915 damaged the light and forced the keepers to abandon the station after waves breaking over the structure contaminated the water supply; they were able to return several days later. The station fared better in a subsequent storm in 1920, after much of the gallery was enclosed in iron plates, but the many issues led to early automation with an acetylene beacon in 1923, though the Fresnel lens was retained until 1971 (when the beacon was converted to solar power), the lamp having been converted to electricity in 1960. The house was used as an observation post during World War II but was unmanned thereafter.

It colloquially has been known by fishermen and outdoorsmen as “The Eighteen Mile Light,” referring to its distance from the old Coast Guard Lifeboat Station.

The exposed location and lack of staffing caused the structure to decay rapidly, and in 2001 the Coast Guard requested bids for removal of the tower and its replacement with a skeleton tower. This was carried out the following year, but the lantern of the tower was preserved and is now on display in a park in Sabine Pass. The lens is now on display at the Museum of the Gulf Coast in Port Arthur. The skeleton tower light remains in service, standing on the old caisson foundation.
