= Permian Basin Regional Planning Commission =

Voluntary association of municipal governments in West Texas, United States of America

- Logo

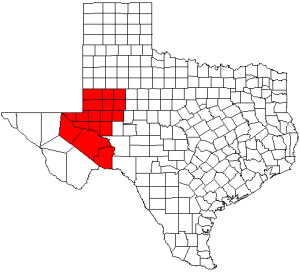
- Map of Texas highlighting counties served by the Permian Basin Regional Planning Commission
- Formation: March 1971
- Type: Voluntary association of governments
- Region served: 23,484 sq mi (60,820 km^{2})
- Members: 17 counties

Historical population
Year	Pop.	±%
2000	376,672	—
2010	417,679	+10.9%
2020	487,845	+16.8%

The Permian Basin Regional Planning Commission (PBRPC) is a voluntary association of cities, counties and special districts in the Permian Basin region of West Texas.

Based in Midland, the Permian Basin Regional Planning Commission is a member of the Texas Association of Regional Councils.

== Counties served ==
- Andrews
- Borden
- Chaves
- Crane
- Dawson
- Ector
- Eddy
- El Paso
- Gaines
- Glasscock
- Howard
- Lea
- Loving
- Martin
- Midland
- Pecos
- Reeves
- Taylor
- Terrell
- Upton
- Ward
- Winkler

== Largest cities in the region ==
- Midland
- Odessa
- Hobbs
- Carlsbad
- Andrews
- Lovington
- Pecos
- Big Lake
