= Central Texas Council of Governments =

- Logo

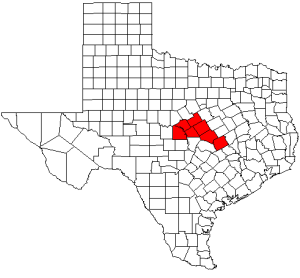
- Map of Texas highlighting counties served by the Central Texas Council of Governments
- Formation: December 1968
- Type: Voluntary association of governments
- Region served: 6,540 sq mi (16,900 km^{2})
- Members: 7 counties

Historical population
Year	Pop.	±%
2000	374,518	—
2010	449,641	+20.1%
2020	518,529	+15.3%

The Central Texas Council of Governments (CTCOG) is a voluntary association of cities, counties and special districts in Central Texas.

Based in Belton, the Central Texas Council of Governments is a member of the Texas Association of Regional Councils.

== Counties served ==
- Bell
- Coryell
- Hamilton
- Lampasas
- Milam
- Mills
- San Saba

== Largest cities in the region (Census 2010 Population) ==
- Killeen (127,921)
- Temple (66,102)
- Copperas Cove (32,032)
- Harker Heights (26,700)
- Belton (18,216)
- Gatesville (15,751)
- Lampasas (6,681)
- Rockdale (5,595)
- Cameron (5,552)
- Nolanville (4,259)

== Military community ==
Fort Hood is located in Bell and Coryell Counties and is the largest employer in the CTCOG region. The U.S. Census recognizes Fort Hood as a Census-Designated Place; in 2010 the Fort Hood CDP had 29,589 residents.
