= West Central Texas Council of Governments =

- Logo

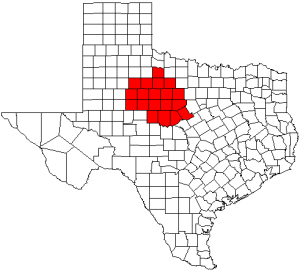
- Map of Texas highlighting counties served by the West Central Texas Council of Governments
- Formation: October 1966
- Type: Voluntary association of governments
- Region served: 17,914 sq mi (46,400 km^{2})
- Members: 19 counties

Historical population
Year	Pop.	±%
2000	324,901	—
2006	323,643	−0.4%

The West Central Texas Council of Governments (WCTCOG) is a voluntary association of cities, counties and special districts in West Central Texas.

Based in Abilene, the West Central Texas Council of Governments is a member of the Texas Association of Regional Councils.

== Counties served ==
- Brown
- Callahan
- Coleman
- Comanche
- Eastland
- Fisher
- Haskell
- Jones
- Kent
- Knox
- Mitchell
- Nolan
- Runnels
- Scurry
- Shackelford
- Stephens
- Stonewall
- Taylor
- Throckmorton

== Largest cities in the region ==
- Abilene
- Brownwood
- Snyder
- Sweetwater
- Breckenridge
- Coleman
- Ballinger
- Colorado City
- Comanche
