= Panhandle Regional Planning Commission =

- Logo

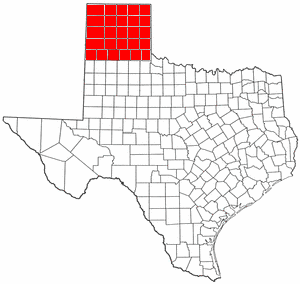
- Map of Texas highlighting counties served by the Panhandle Regional Planning Commission
- Formation: 1969
- Type: Voluntary association of governments
- Region served: 26,000 sq mi (67,000 km^{2})
- Members: 26 counties

Historical population
Year	Pop.	±%
2000	402,862	—
2010	427,927	+6.2%
2020	434,358	+1.5%

The Panhandle Regional Planning Commission (PRPC) is a voluntary association of cities, counties and special districts in the Texas Panhandle.

Based in Amarillo, the Panhandle Regional Planning Commission is a member of the Texas Association of Regional Councils.

== Counties served ==
- Armstrong
- Briscoe
- Carson
- Castro
- Childress
- Collingsworth
- Dallam
- Deaf Smith
- Donley
- Gray
- Hall
- Hansford
- Hartley
- Hemphill
- Hutchinson
- Lipscomb
- Moore
- Ochiltree
- Oldham
- Parmer
- Potter
- Randall
- Roberts
- Sherman
- Swisher
- Wheeler

== Largest cities in the region ==
- Amarillo
- Pampa
- Hereford
- Borger
- Dumas
- Canyon
- Dalhart
- Perryton
- Childress
