= South Plains Association of Governments =

- Logo

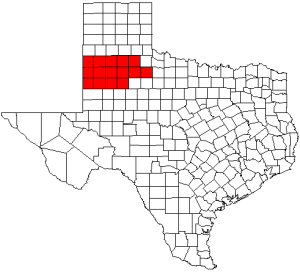
- Map of Texas highlighting counties served by the South Plains Association of Governments
- Formation: June 1967
- Type: Voluntary association of governments
- Region served: 13,756 sq mi (35,630 km^{2})
- Members: 15 counties

Historical population
Year	Pop.	±%
2000	377,871	—
2006	383,062	+1.4%

The South Plains Association of Governments (SPAG) is a voluntary association of cities, counties and special districts in the South Plains region of Texas.

Based in Lubbock, the South Plains Association of Governments is a member of the Texas Association of Regional Councils.

== Counties served ==
- Bailey
- Cochran
- Crosby
- Dickens
- Floyd
- Garza
- Hale
- Hockley
- King
- Lamb
- Lubbock
- Lynn
- Motley
- Terry
- Yoakum

== Largest cities in the region ==
- Lubbock
- Plainview
- Levelland
- Brownfield
- Littlefield
- Slaton
- Muleshoe
