= Kiamichi Economic Development District of Oklahoma =

- Map of Oklahoma highlighting counties served by the Kiamichi Economic Development District of Oklahoma
- Established: 1967
- Number of Counties: 7

Area
  - Total: 21,275.4 km^{2} (8,214.46 sq mi)

Population (2009 est.)
  - Total: 178,194

The Kiamichi Economic Development District of Oklahoma (KEDDO) is a voluntary association of cities, counties and special districts in Southeastern Oklahoma.

Based in Wilburton, the Kiamichi Economic Development District of Oklahoma is a member of the Oklahoma Association of Regional Councils (OARC).

== Counties served ==
- Choctaw
- Haskell
- Latimer
- Le Flore
- McCurtain
- Pittsburg
- Pushmataha

== Largest cities in the region ==
City	Population (2008 est.)
McAlester	18,388
Poteau	8,258
Idabel	6,851
Hugo	5,390
Pocola	4,464
Broken Bow	4,146

== Demographics ==
As of the census of 2000, there were 175,957 people, 67,896 households, and 48,946 families residing within the region. The racial makeup of the region was 75.87% White, 4.54% African American, 13.20% Native American, 0.22% Asian, 0.03% Pacific Islander, 0.97% from other races, and 5.17% from two or more races. Hispanic or Latino of any race were 2.63% of the population.

The median income for a household in the region was $24,786, and the median income for a family was $30,485. The per capita income for the region was $13,529.
