= Calhoun County Independent School District =

School district in Texas, United States

Address
- 525 North Commerce Street Port Lavaca, TX, 77979; United States
- Coordinates: 28.620°N 96.628°W

District information
- Grades: PK–12
- Schools: 7
- NCES District ID: 4812480

Students and staff
- Students: 3,533 (2023–2024)
- Teachers: 262.46 (on an FTE basis)
- Student–teacher ratio: 13.46:1

Other information
- Website: www.calcoisd.org

Calhoun County Independent School District is a public school district based in Port Lavaca, Texas (USA).

Its boundary is that of Calhoun County.

== History ==
The district was formed in July 1948 with the consolidation of the Seadrift, Olivia, Six Mile, Long Mott, Magnolia Beach, Kamey, Port O'Connor, and Roemerville districts into the Port Lavaca Independent School District. As the consolidation resulted in the combined district having boundaries coinciding with those of Calhoun County, the district took its present name in September 1948.

In 2009, the school district was rated "recognized" by the Texas Education Agency.

== Schools ==
- Calhoun High School (Port Lavaca; grades 9–12)
- Travis Middle School (Port Lavaca; grades 6–8)
  - 1983-84 National Blue Ribbon School
- Seadrift School (Seadrift; grades PK–8)
- Port O'Connor Elementary School (Port O'Connor; grades PK–5)
  - 2004 National Blue Ribbon School
- Jackson-Roosevelt Elementary School (Port Lavaca; grades PK–5)
- Harrison-Jefferson-Madison Elementary School (Port Lavaca; grades PK–5)
- Hope Alternative High School (Port Lavaca; grades 9–12)

=== Former Schools ===
- Point Comfort Elementary School (Point Comfort; grades K–5)
  - 2006 National Blue Ribbon School
