= Danciger, Texas =

- Unincorporated community
- Location within the state of Texas Danciger (the United States)
- Coordinates: 29°10′18″N 95°49′08″W
- Country: United States
- State: Texas
- County: Brazoria
- Time zone: UTC-6 (Central (CST))
  - Summer (DST): UTC-5 (CDT)

Danciger is an unincorporated community in Brazoria County, Texas, United States. According to the Handbook of Texas, the community had a population of 357 in 2000. It is located within the Greater Houston metropolitan area.

== History ==
Danciger was founded when the local oil and refining company opened the Pledger Dome gas field in 1933. A post office was established at Danciger in 1934. It had two businesses in 1939, with a population of 150 residents. The population jumped to 314 from 1974 through 1990. Danciger still had two businesses in 1978, with two more opening in the early 1990s. Its population grew to 357 in 2000, while returning to only two businesses.

== Geography ==
Danciger is located on Farm to Market Road 1301 near Dance Bayou and the Matagorda County line, 10 mi (16 km) west of West Columbia, 25 mi (40 km) west of Angleton, 24 mi (39 km) southeast of Wharton, and 24 mi (39 km) northeast of Bay City in extreme west central Brazoria County.

== Government and infrastructure ==
The United States Postal Service operates the Danciger Post Office on Farm to Market Road 1301. In July 2011 the USPS announced that it may close the post office. Joe King, the Brazoria County Judge, said in 2011 that he was not surprised that the postal agency targeted the post office for closure and that "[f]or years when I drove by, I wondered how many people it served. There's nothing there — just this tiny house about the size of my office, sitting in the yard of another house. There's nothing else out there."

== Education ==
The Columbia-Brazoria Independent School District operates schools in the area.
