= Fort Point Light (Texas) =

- Location: Entrance to Galveston Bay, Texas
- Coordinates: 29.337°N 94.770°W (approx.)

Tower
- Constructed: 1881
- Foundation: screw-pile
- Construction: cast-iron/wood
- Height: 47 feet (14 m)
- Shape: Hexagonal house on piles

Light
- First lit: 1882
- Deactivated: 1909
- Lens: Fourth order Fresnel lens
- Characteristic: Fixed white with several red and dark sectors

Fort Point Light was a lighthouse located on the south side of the entrance to Galveston Bay in Texas. It served as an important navigational aid for vessels entering the bay during the late 19th and early 20th centuries.

== History ==
The site for Fort Point Light was reserved as early as 1836 by the Republic of Texas, but construction did not begin until Congress appropriated funds in 1878. The lighthouse was completed in 1881 and first lit in 1882. Built on a screw-pile foundation, the structure featured a hexagonal keeper's dwelling with a cast-iron frame and wooden elements, topped by a lantern housing a fourth-order Fresnel lens.

The light marked the southern approach to Galveston Bay and provided fixed white illumination with red and dark sectors to guide ships through the channel. Despite its strategic location, the light was discontinued in 1909 after only 27 years of service, as newer aids to navigation were introduced.

Although the light was removed, the station continued to operate as a fog signal until 1950. The remaining structure was dismantled in 1953. Today, a modern beacon near the original site functions as a range light for the Houston Ship Channel.

== Legacy ==
Fort Point Light is remembered as part of the early system of Gulf Coast lighthouses that supported maritime trade and safety during Galveston's rise as a major port city in the late 19th century.
