= Simpsonville, Texas =

Unincorporated community in Texas, US

Simpsonville
- Unincorporated community
- Interactive map of Simpsonville
- Location within Texas Simpsonville (the United States)
- Coordinates: 32°51′39″N 95°04′10″W
- Country: United States
- State: Texas
- County: Upshur County

Simpsonville is an unincorporated community in northwestern Upshur County, Texas, United States.

== History ==
Originally named Chelsea when founded in the 1850s, the town name was changed to Simpsonville on April 22, 1858, in honor of an early settler. Highway signage and road maps indicate this community is named Thomas, due to a subsequent renaming of the town occasioned in 1913 when the town's application for a new post office—the most recent post office had been closed in 1906 by postal officials—had been rejected on the grounds that a Matagorda County town called Simpsonville had just been granted a post office.
