= Port O'Connor, Texas =

- Census-designated place
- Location within Texas Location within the United States
- Coordinates: 28°26′51″N 96°24′19″W
- Country: United States
- State: Texas
- County: Calhoun

Area
  - Total: 6.3 sq mi (16.4 km^{2})
  - Land: 4.0 sq mi (10.3 km^{2})
  - Water: 2.3 sq mi (6.0 km^{2})
- Elevation: 7 ft (2.1 m)

Population (2020)
  - Total: 954
  - Density: 240/sq mi (92.6/km^{2})
- Time zone: UTC-6 (Central (CST))
  - Summer (DST): UTC-5 (CDT)
- ZIP code: 77982
- Area code: 361
- FIPS code: 48-58952
- GNIS feature ID: 2586973

Port O'Connor is an unincorporated community and census-designated place (CDP) in Calhoun County, Texas, United States, near the Gulf coastline between Galveston and Corpus Christi. As of the 2020 census, Port O'Connor had a population of 954. It is part of the Victoria, Texas metropolitan statistical area.

== History ==
Port O'Connor was laid out in the late 19th century as a fishing settlement called "Alligator Head". As it grew in popularity with both permanent residents and tourists, the community took on more municipal characteristics, earning the formal designation finally in 1909 as the town site of Port O'Connor. It was named after its main landowner at the time, Thomas M. O'Connor, son of Thomas O'Connor, who owned 70,000 acres (280 km^{2}). Aside from local cattle raising and fishing, the town was also a producer of figs and citrus fruit.

Its initial population growth spanned the years 1909 to 1919. Excursion trains ran on weekends to Port O'Connor, and an estimated 10,000 tourists came every summer.

Port O'Connor has been struck by four hurricanes since it was initially settled. The 1919 Florida Keys hurricane brought the "good old days" to a halt, destroying the town. It rebuilt slowly, but the 1942 and 1945 hurricanes so close in time were hard to overcome. In 1961, Port O'Connor was in the midst of another growth boom due to the increase of military personnel on nearby Matagorda Island Air Force Base. That same year, Hurricane Carla destroyed the town again, but times reflect its will to survive, fueled by tourism, commercial fisheries, and the petrochemical industry. Hurricane Harvey struck the town again in 2017.

== Demographics ==
Historical population
Census	Pop.	Note	%±
1980	1,031		—
2010	1,253		—
2020	954		−23.9%
U.S. Decennial Census; 1850–1900 1910; 1920 1930 1940; 1950 1960 1970; 1980 1990 2000; 2010 2020

Port O'Connor first appeared as a census designated place in the 1980 United States census. It was deleted prior to the 1990 U.S. census; and relisted as a CDP in the 2010 U.S. census.

=== 2020 census ===
Port O'Connor CDP, Texas – Racial and ethnic composition Note: the US Census treats Hispanic/Latino as an ethnic category. This table excludes Latinos from the racial categories and assigns them to a separate category. Hispanics/Latinos may be of any race.
Race / Ethnicity (NH = Non-Hispanic)	Pop 2010	Pop 2020	% 2010	% 2020
White alone (NH)	931	790	74.30%	82.81%
Black or African American alone (NH)	11	1	0.88%	0.10%
Native American or Alaska Native alone (NH)	4	3	0.32%	0.31%
Asian alone (NH)	16	1	1.28%	0.10%
Native Hawaiian or Pacific Islander alone (NH)	0	0	0.00%	0.00%
Other race alone (NH)	0	2	0.00%	0.21%
Mixed race or Multiracial (NH)	11	22	0.88%	2.31%
Hispanic or Latino (any race)	280	135	22.35%	14.15%
Total	1,253	954	100.00%	100.00%

As of the 2020 United States census, there were 954 people, 433 households, and 331 families residing in the CDP.

== Education ==
Port O'Connor is served by the Calhoun County Independent School District.

Due to its small population, the town has only one school, Port O'Connor Elementary School, which has the dolphin as its mascot. Port O'Connor Elementary School covers prekindergarten through grade five. Children are then bused to the nearby town of Seadrift or to Port Lavaca to finish their sixth- through twelfth-grade educations. The secondary schools that serve Port O'Connor are Seadrift Middle School, Travis Middle School, and Calhoun High School.
