= Calhoun High School (Texas) =

Location
- 201 Sandcrab Boulevard; Port Lavaca, Texas 77979-2489; United States; 28°37′17″N 96°38′32″W

Information
- School type: Public high school
- Established: 1948
- School district: Calhoun County Independent School District
- Principal: Dana Dworaczyk
- Teaching staff: 78.33 (FTE)
- Grades: 9-12
- Enrollment: 995 (2023-2024)
- Student to teacher ratio: 12.70
- Colors: Black & Gold
- Athletics conference: UIL Class AAAA
- Mascot: Sandcrabs/Sandies
- Website: Calhoun High School

Calhoun High School is a public high school located in Port Lavaca. It is part of the Calhoun County Independent School District and serves students throughout Calhoun County. The school was established following the consolidation of all country schools in 1948. The present school was built in the 1960s when the former high school, now Travis Middle School, became overcrowded. Calhoun High School was also featured in Season 2, Episode 3 of World's Strictest Parents Australia as the school Aussie teens Thea and Corie attended during their stay in Texas.

For the 2024-2025 school year, the school was given a "B" by the Texas Education Agency.

== Athletics ==
The Calhoun Sandcrabs/Sandies compete in the following sports as a member of UIL Class AAAA:

- Baseball
- Basketball
- Cross Country
- Football
- Golf
- Powerlifting
- Soccer
- Softball
- Tennis
- Track and Field
- Volleyball
