= Seadrift, Texas =

- City
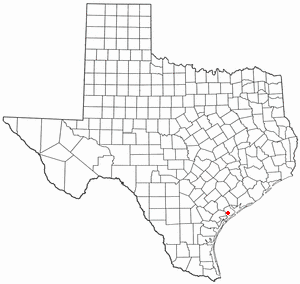
- Location of Seadrift, Texas

- Coordinates: 28°24′47″N 96°42′59″W
- Country: United States
- State: Texas
- County: Calhoun

Area
  - Total: 1.53 sq mi (3.95 km^{2})
  - Land: 1.28 sq mi (3.31 km^{2})
  - Water: 0.25 sq mi (0.64 km^{2})
- Elevation: 13 ft (4.0 m)

Population (2020)
  - Total: 995
  - Density: 779/sq mi (301/km^{2})
- Time zone: UTC-6 (Central (CST))
  - Summer (DST): UTC-5 (CDT)
- ZIP code: 77983
- Area code: 361
- FIPS code: 48-66416
- GNIS feature ID: 2411848
- Website: seadrifttx.org

Seadrift is a city in Calhoun County, Texas, United States. The population was 995 at the 2020 census. It is a part of the Victoria metropolitan area, Texas.

== Geography ==
Seadrift is located in southwestern Calhoun County. It is on the northeastern shore of San Antonio Bay, 60 miles (97 km) by air but 80 miles (130 km) by road northeast of Corpus Christi and 145 miles (233 km) southeast of San Antonio.

According to the United States Census Bureau, the city has a total area of 1.2 square miles (3.2 km^{2}), of which 0.02 square miles (0.06 km^{2}), or 1.98%, is water.

=== Climate ===
The climate in this area is characterized by hot, humid summers and generally mild to cool winters. According to the Köppen Climate Classification system, Seadrift has a humid subtropical climate, abbreviated "Cfa" on climate maps.

== Demographics ==
Historical population
Census	Pop.	Note	%±
1920	321		—
1930	413		28.7%
1940	437		5.8%
1950	567		29.7%
1960	1,082		90.8%
1970	1,092		0.9%
1980	1,277		16.9%
1990	1,277		0.0%
2000	1,352		5.9%
2010	1,364		0.9%
2020	995		−27.1%
U.S. Decennial Census

=== 2020 census ===
As of the 2020 census, Seadrift had a population of 995, 393 households, and 353 families residing in the city.

The median age was 45.4 years, with 21.3% of residents under the age of 18 and 23.6% aged 65 years or older, and there were 101.4 males for every 100 females and 105.0 males for every 100 females age 18 and over.

There were 393 households in Seadrift, of which 30.3% had children under the age of 18 living in them. Of all households, 49.6% were married-couple households, 21.1% were households with a male householder and no spouse or partner present, and 23.2% were households with a female householder and no spouse or partner present. About 25.5% of all households were made up of individuals and 10.4% had someone living alone who was 65 years of age or older.

There were 673 housing units, of which 41.6% were vacant, with a homeowner vacancy rate of 5.3% and a rental vacancy rate of 13.1%. 0.0% of residents lived in urban areas, while 100.0% lived in rural areas.

Racial composition as of the 2020 census
Race	Number	Percent
White	670	67.3%
Black or African American	10	1.0%
American Indian and Alaska Native	7	0.7%
Asian	71	7.1%
Native Hawaiian and Other Pacific Islander	1	0.1%
Some other race	73	7.3%
Two or more races	163	16.4%
Hispanic or Latino (of any race)	276	27.7%

=== 2000 census ===
At the census of 2000, there were 1,352 people, 488 households, and 347 families residing in the city. The population density was 1,083.1 inhabitants per square mile (418.2/km^{2}). There were 652 housing units at an average density of 522.3 per square mile (201.7/km^{2}). The racial makeup of the city was 77.74% White, 0.89% African American, 0.22% Native American, 10.21% Asian, 7.91% from other races, and 3.03% from two or more races. Hispanic or Latino of any race were 27.07% of the population.

There were 488 households, out of which 36.9% had children under the age of 18 living with them, 57.2% were married couples living together, 9.2% had a female householder with no husband present, and 28.7% were non-families. 25.8% of all households were made up of individuals, and 12.9% had someone living alone who was 65 years of age or older. The average household size was 2.77 and the average family size was 3.34.

In the city, the population was 32.8% under the age of 18, 6.9% from 18 to 24, 25.7% from 25 to 44, 21.2% from 45 to 64, and 13.5% who were 65 years of age or older. The median age was 34 years. For every 100 females, there were 96.5 males. For every 100 females age 18 and over, there were 95.7 males. The median income for a household in the city was $26,339, and the median income for a family was $31,010. Males had a median income of $29,531 versus $21,250 for females. The per capita income for the city was $11,481. About 20.6% of families and 25.1% of the population were below the poverty line, including 33.1% of those under age 18 and 11.7% of those age 65 or over.

== Education ==
Seadrift residents are served by the Calhoun County Independent School District. Seadrift School serves residents from Pre-Kindergarten through eighth grade. Residents attend Calhoun High School in Port Lavaca for high school.

== 1979 incident ==
Seadrift is remembered for a killing that took place on August 3, 1979. Prior to this date, there had been several negative racial incidents between local citizens and Vietnamese refugees. As the central area relied heavily on the commercial fishing industry for income, many White natives felt threatened by the increasing number of Vietnamese. On the night of August 3, 1979, a fight broke out between Billy Joe Aplin, 35-year-old crabber, and Sau Van Nguyen, a Vietnamese crabber, which ended with the fatal shooting of Aplin. Within hours of the shooting, several Vietnamese boats were burned and there was an attempted bombing of a crab plant that employed Vietnamese workers. Sau Van Nguyen and his brother Chinh Nguyen were tried for murder and acquitted on the grounds of self-defense. The incident inspired the creation of both the 1981 documentary Fire on the Water and the 1985 film Alamo Bay. In January 2019, Title 8 Productions, LLC premiered an independent documentary called, Seadrift, in Park City Utah. It continues to be screened throughout the United States. The documentary series "Reel South" examined the 1979 incident in the 2020 film "Seadrift".
