= Calhoun County, Texas =

County in Texas, United States

- County
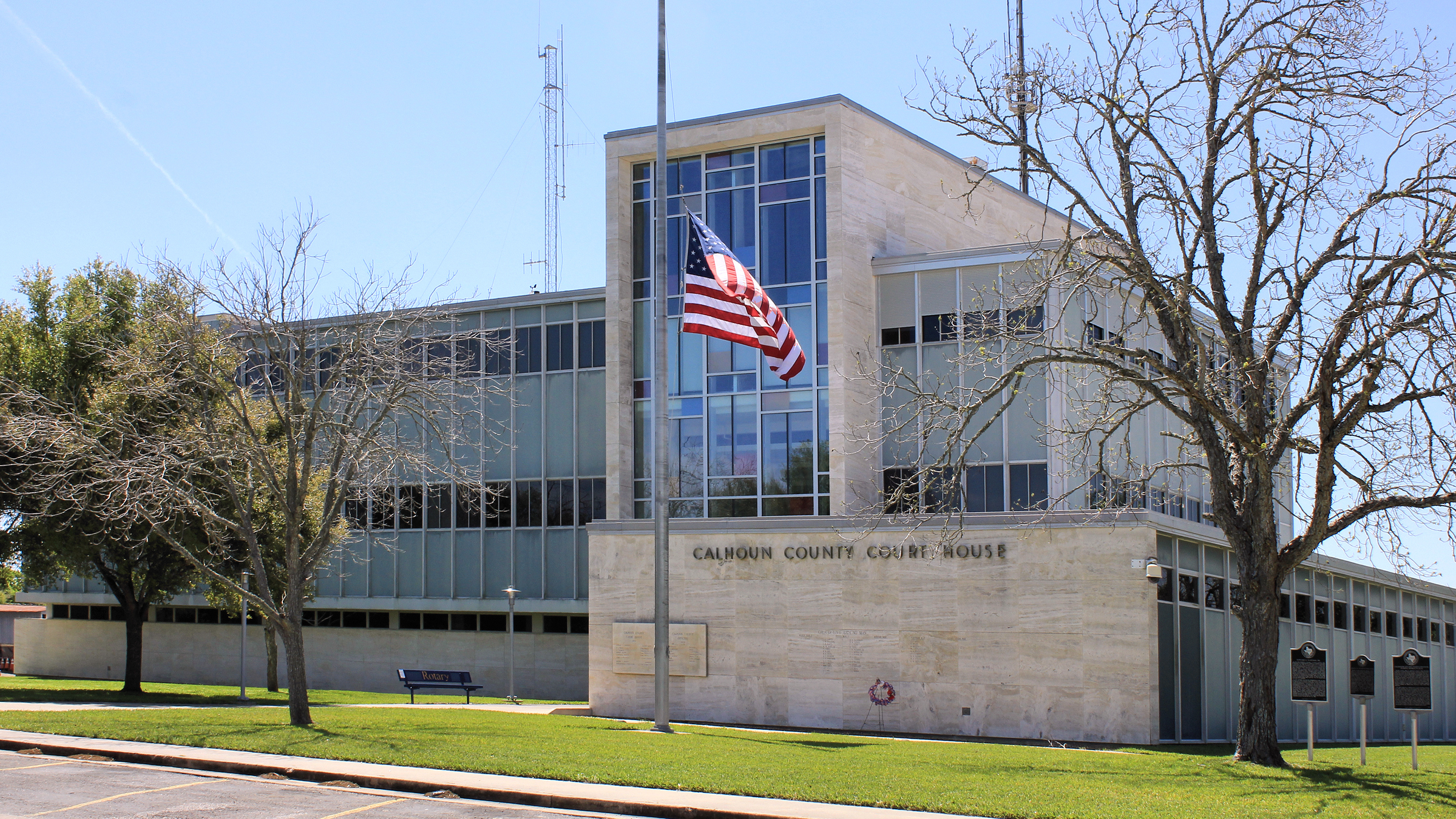
- Calhoun County Courthouse

- Location within the U.S. state of Texas
- Coordinates: 28°26′N 96°37′W
- Country: United States
- State: Texas
- Founded: 1846
- Named for: John C. Calhoun
- Seat: Port Lavaca
- Largest city: Port Lavaca

Area
  - Total: 1,033 sq mi (2,680 km^{2})
  - Land: 507 sq mi (1,310 km^{2})
  - Water: 526 sq mi (1,360 km^{2}) 51%

Population (2020)
  - Total: 20,106
  - Estimate (2025): 19,599 ▼
  - Density: 39.7/sq mi (15.3/km^{2})
- Time zone: UTC−6 (Central)
  - Summer (DST): UTC−5 (CDT)
- Congressional district: 27th
- Website: www.calhouncotx.org

Calhoun County is a county located in the U.S. state of Texas. As of the 2020 census, the population was 20,106. Its county seat is Port Lavaca. The county is named for John Caldwell Calhoun, the seventh vice president of the United States. Calhoun County comprises the Port Lavaca, Texas micropolitan statistical area, which is also included in the Victoria-Port Lavaca, Texas combined statistical area.

== History ==
- Paleo-Indians Hunter-gatherers, and later Comanche, Tonkawa, and Karankawa tribes, first inhabitants.
- 1685-1690 René-Robert Cavelier, Sieur de La Salle lands near Powderhorn Lake in Calhoun County. France plants its flag on Texas soil, but departs after only five years.
- 1689 The future county is explored by Spaniards, including Alonso De León.
- 1825 Martín De León of Mexico establishes a ranch near the old La Salle fort.
- 1831 Linnville becomes the first Anglo settlement, established by Irish-born merchant, statesman, soldier John J. Linn.
- 1840 Comanche Indians loot and sack Linnville.
- 1842-1847 Empresario Henri Castro contracts to bring Alsatian immigrants from France, who use Port Lavaca as a holding site before moving on to settle Castroville in Medina County.
- 1845 Thousands of German immigrants are stranded at port of disembarkation Indianaola on Matagorda Bay.
- 1846 Calhoun County is formed from parts of Victoria, Jackson, and Matagorda counties. It is named for then Chairman of the Senate Finance Committee John C. Calhoun. Lavaca was the first county seat.
- 1852 Indianola becomes the county seat. The Morgan steamship lines runs regular service from Indianola to New York City. Slave trading peaks at Indianola.
- 1854 Poles begin to arrive in Indianaola.
- 1858 Half Moon Reef Lighthouse is constructed in Matagorda Bay.
- 1860 County population is 2,642, including 414 slaves.
- 1861 Calhoun County votes 276-18 for secession from the Union. Contributes volunteer companies to the Confederate cause. Fort Esperanza, on Matagorda Island, is constructed by Confederate forces using slave labor.
- 1862 Union gunboats bombard Port Lavaca.
- 1875 A hurricane heavily damages Indianola.
- 1886 A hurricane destroys Indianola and causes much damage to Houston.
- 1892 The Lutheran community of Olivia is established by Swedes.
- 1909 Port O’Connor is established. The St. Louis, Brownsville and Mexico Railway establishes a terminus at Port O’Connor.
- 1920 Port Lavaca builds a seawall to protect itself against hurricanes.
- 1931 Lavaca Bay causeway is constructed.
- 1934-1935 Oil and natural gas discovered near Port Lavaca.
- 1947 Alcoa opens a plant at Point Comfort.
- 1952 Union Carbide opens a plant near Seadrift.
- 1961 Category 4 Hurricane Carla makes landfall between Port Lavaca and Port O’Connor.
- 1983 Matagorda Island State Park and Wildlife Management Area is run by the Texas Parks and Wildlife Department under an agreement between the United States Department of the Interior and the state of Texas.

== Geography ==
According to the U.S. Census Bureau, the county has a total area of 1,033 square miles (2,680 km^{2}), of which 526 square miles (1,360 km^{2}) (51%) are covered by water. It borders the Gulf of Mexico.

=== Adjacent counties ===
- Jackson County (north)
- Matagorda County (east)
- (Gulf of Mexico) (southeast)
- Aransas County (southwest)
- Refugio County (west)
- Victoria County (northwest)

=== National protected area ===
- Aransas National Wildlife Refuge (part)

== Demographics ==
Historical population
Census	Pop.	Note	%±
1850	1,110		—
1860	2,642		138.0%
1870	3,443		30.3%
1880	1,739		−49.5%
1890	815		−53.1%
1900	2,395		193.9%
1910	3,635		51.8%
1920	4,700		29.3%
1930	5,385		14.6%
1940	5,911		9.8%
1950	9,222		56.0%
1960	16,592		79.9%
1970	17,831		7.5%
1980	19,574		9.8%
1990	19,053		−2.7%
2000	20,647		8.4%
2010	21,381		3.6%
2020	20,106		−6.0%
2025 (est.)	19,599	▼	−2.5%
U.S. Decennial Census; 1850–2010 2010–2020

=== 2020 census ===
As of the 2020 census, 20,106 people, 7,614 households, and 5,502 families were residing in the county. The median age was 40.8 years, with 22.9% of residents under 18 and 19.1% at 65 or older. For every 100 females, there were 104.7 males, and for every 100 females 18 and over, there were 104.5 males.

The racial makeup of the county was 56.5% White, 2.1% Black or African American, 0.6% American Indian and Alaska Native, 5.5% Asian, <0.1% Native Hawaiian and Pacific Islander, 12.1% from some other race, and 23.1% from two or more races. Hispanic or Latino residents of any race comprised 49.0% of the population.

About 60.0% of residents lived in urban areas, while 40.0% lived in rural areas.

Of the 7,614 households in the county, 31.6% had children under 18 living in them, 50.7% were married-couple households, 21.6% were households with a male householder and no spouse or partner present, and 22.9% were households with a female householder and no spouse or partner present. About 24.9% of all households were made up of individuals, and 11.7% had someone living alone who was 65 or older.

The county had 10,539 housing units, of which 27.8% were vacant. Among occupied housing units, 71.3% were owner-occupied and 28.7% were renter-occupied. The homeowner vacancy rate was 2.0% and the rental vacancy rate was 15.2%.

=== Racial and ethnic composition ===
Calhoun County, Texas – Racial and ethnic composition Note: the US Census treats Hispanic/Latino as an ethnic category. This table excludes Latinos from the racial categories and assigns them to a separate category. Hispanics/Latinos may be of any race.
Race / Ethnicity (NH = Non-Hispanic)	Pop 1980	Pop 1990	Pop 2000	Pop 2010	Pop 2020	% 1980	% 1990	% 2000	% 2010	% 2020
White alone (NH)	12,142	11,021	10,774	9,794	8,374	62.03%	57.84%	52.18%	45.81%	41.65%
Black or African American alone (NH)	608	542	521	519	361	3.11%	2.84%	2.52%	2.43%	1.80%
Native American or Alaska Native alone (NH)	46	31	55	36	34	0.24%	0.16%	0.27%	0.17%	0.17%
Asian alone (NH)	127	548	665	943	1,112	0.65%	2.88%	3.22%	4.41%	5.53%
Native Hawaiian or Pacific Islander alone (NH)	x	x	7	4	0	x	x	0.03%	0.02%	0.00%
Other race alone (NH)	0	18	16	15	56	0.00%	0.09%	0.08%	0.07%	0.28%
Multiracial (NH)	x	x	161	148	311	x	x	0.78%	0.69%	1.55%
Hispanic or Latino (any race)	6,651	6,893	8,448	9,922	9,858	33.98%	36.18%	40.92%	46.41%	49.03%
Total	19,574	19,053	20,647	21,381	20,106	100.00%	100.00%	100.00%	100.00%	100.00%

=== 2010 census ===
As of the 2010 census, 21,381 people were living in the county. The racial makeup was 81.5% White, 4.4% Asian, 2.6% Black or African American, 0.5% Native American, 8.8% of some other race, and 2.1% werre two or more races; 46.4% were Hispanic or Latino.

=== 2000 census ===
As of the 2000 census, 20,647 people, 7,442 households, and 5,574 families resided in the county. The population density was 40 people per square mile (15 people/km^{2}). The 10,238 housing units had an average density of 20 per square mile (7.7/km^{2}). The racial makeup of the county was 78.04% White, 2.63% Black or African American, 0.49% Native American, 3.27% Asian, 0.07% Pacific Islander, 13.19% from other races, and 2.32% from two or more races. About 40.92% of the population were Hispanic or Latino of any race.

Of the 7,442 households, 35.4% had children under 18 living with them, 59.2% were married couples living together, 11.0% had a female householder with no husband present, and 25.1% were not families. About 21.3% of all households were made up of individuals, and 8.9% had someone living alone who was 65 or older. The average household size was 2.75 and the average family size was 3.20.

In the county, the age distribution was 28.5% under 18, 8.7% from 18 to 24, 27.3% from 25 to 44, 22.3% from 45 to 64, and 13.3% who were 65 or older. The median age was 35 years. For every 100 females, there were 100.90 males. For every 100 females 18 and over, there were 99.70 males.

The median income in the county for a household was $35,849 and for a family was $39,900. Males had a median income of $35,957 versus $19,772 for females. The per capita income for the county was $17,125. About 12.7% of families and 16.4% of the population were below the poverty line, including 21.3% of those under 18 and 11.70% of those 65 or over.

== Politics ==
United States presidential election results for Calhoun County, Texas
Year	Republican		Democratic		Third party(ies)	
Year	No.	%	No.	%	No.	%
1912	36	7.84%	355	77.34%	68	14.81%
1916	84	15.44%	388	71.32%	72	13.24%
1920	95	16.93%	363	64.71%	103	18.36%
1924	181	20.07%	686	76.05%	35	3.88%
1928	333	46.84%	375	52.74%	3	0.42%
1932	100	10.59%	834	88.35%	10	1.06%
1936	92	11.78%	685	87.71%	4	0.51%
1940	152	13.97%	935	85.94%	1	0.09%
1944	158	14.73%	732	68.22%	183	17.05%
1948	346	33.59%	589	57.18%	95	9.22%
1952	1,406	63.28%	813	36.59%	3	0.14%
1956	1,912	63.90%	1,067	35.66%	13	0.43%
1960	1,599	44.49%	1,961	54.56%	34	0.95%
1964	1,031	23.25%	3,398	76.64%	5	0.11%
1968	1,672	31.25%	2,612	48.82%	1,066	19.93%
1972	3,614	64.93%	1,936	34.78%	16	0.29%
1976	2,377	39.22%	3,642	60.09%	42	0.69%
1980	3,312	50.57%	3,034	46.33%	203	3.10%
1984	4,434	62.99%	2,586	36.74%	19	0.27%
1988	3,183	48.79%	3,314	50.80%	27	0.41%
1992	2,640	38.94%	2,550	37.62%	1,589	23.44%
1996	2,832	46.33%	2,753	45.04%	528	8.64%
2000	3,724	56.74%	2,766	42.15%	73	1.11%
2004	4,348	62.75%	2,561	36.96%	20	0.29%
2008	4,106	59.69%	2,729	39.67%	44	0.64%
2012	4,144	62.33%	2,410	36.25%	94	1.41%
2016	4,638	66.50%	2,118	30.37%	218	3.13%
2020	5,641	71.70%	2,148	27.30%	79	1.00%
2024	5,939	75.83%	1,853	23.66%	40	0.51%

United States Senate election results for Calhoun County, Texas1
Year	Republican		Democratic		Third party(ies)	
Year	No.	%	No.	%	No.	%
2024	5,603	72.22%	2,018	26.01%	137	1.77%

United States Senate election results for Calhoun County, Texas2
Year	Republican		Democratic		Third party(ies)	
Year	No.	%	No.	%	No.	%
2020	5,531	71.41%	2,092	27.01%	122	1.58%

Texas Gubernatorial election results for Calhoun County
Year	Republican		Democratic		Third party(ies)	
Year	No.	%	No.	%	No.	%
2022	4,228	75.61%	1,292	23.10%	72	1.29%

== Education ==
All of Calhoun County is served by the Calhoun County Independent School District.

All of the county is in the service area of Victoria College.

Our Lady of the Gulf Catholic School, prekindergarten through grade 8, has also served the county since 1996.

== Transportation ==
=== Major highways ===
- U.S. Highway 87
- State Highway 35
- State Highway 172
- State Highway 185
- State Highway 238
- State Highway 316
- Spur 159

=== Airport ===
Calhoun County Airport, a general aviation airport, is located in unincorporated Calhoun County northwest of Port Lavaca.

== Communities ==
=== Cities ===
- Point Comfort
- Port Lavaca (county seat)
- Seadrift

=== Census-designated places ===
- Alamo Beach
- Magnolia Beach
- Port O'Connor

=== Other unincorporated communities ===
- Long Mott
- Olivia
- Port Alto
- Schicke Point

=== Ghost towns ===
- Indianola
- Kamey
- Linnville
- Sixmile

== Notable people ==
- Augustus Carl Büchel (1813–1864), German-born Confederate officer who died of wounds received at the Battle of Pleasant Hill, Louisiana.

== See also ==
- List of museums in the Texas Gulf Coast
- National Register of Historic Places listings in Calhoun County, Texas
- Recorded Texas Historic Landmarks in Calhoun County
