= Port Lavaca, Texas =

- City
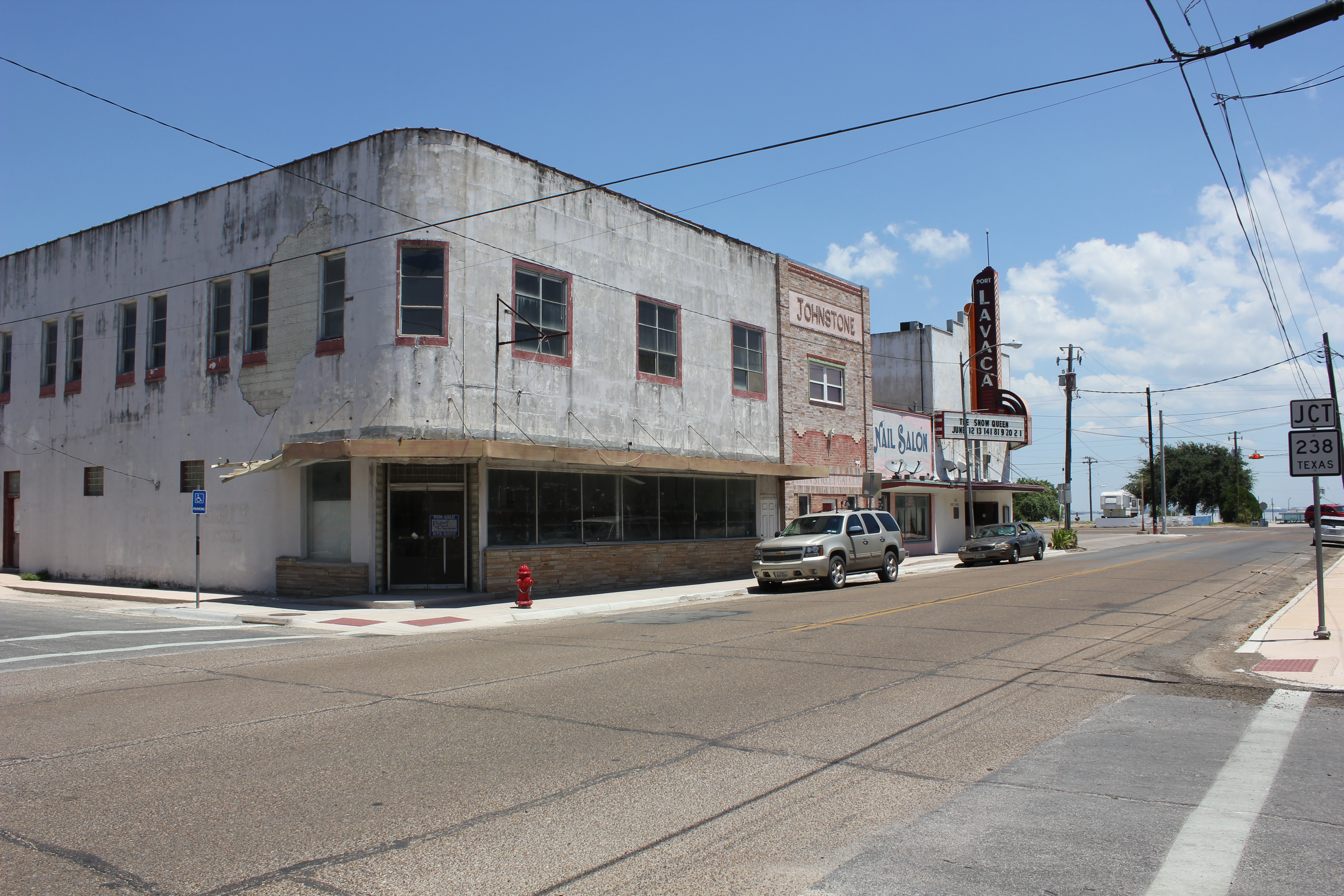
- Downtown Port Lavaca
- Nicknames: Port of the Cow, Paradise on the Bay
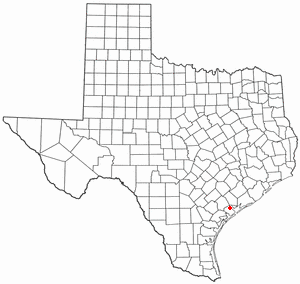
- Location of Port Lavaca, Texas

- Coordinates: 28°36′53″N 96°37′34″W
- Country: United States
- State: Texas
- County: Calhoun

Area
  - Total: 14.11 sq mi (36.54 km^{2})
  - Land: 10.15 sq mi (26.29 km^{2})
  - Water: 3.96 sq mi (10.25 km^{2})
- Elevation: 16 ft (4.9 m)

Population (2020)
  - Total: 11,557
  - Estimate (2021): 11,259
  - Density: 1,139/sq mi (439.6/km^{2})
- Time zone: UTC-6 (Central (CST))
  - Summer (DST): UTC-5 (CDT)
- ZIP code: 77979
- Area code: 361
- FIPS code: 48-58916
- GNIS feature ID: 2411464
- Website: www.portlavaca.gov

Port Lavaca (/ləˈvɑːkə/ lə-VAH-kə) is a city in Calhoun County, located in the U.S. state of Texas. The population was 12,248 at the 2010 census and 11,557 at the 2020 census. It is the county seat of Calhoun County and part of the Port Lavaca, Texas micropolitan statistical area. Port Lavaca is 130 miles (210 km) southwest of Houston.

== History ==
Port Lavaca was originally known as Lavaca. The town quickly grew as a result of the Linnville Raid of 1840, in which the town of Linville was decimated by the Comanche tribe and caused former residents of the town to settle in what is now Port Lavaca. Thomas McConnell purchased a section of land from Isidro Benavides and established the town using this land.

== Geography ==
Port Lavaca is located in northern Calhoun County on the west side of Lavaca Bay, an arm of Matagorda Bay. According to the United States Census Bureau, the city has a total area of 14.1 square miles (36.5 km^{2}), of which 10.2 square miles (26.3 km^{2}) are land and 3.9 square miles (10.2 km^{2}), or 28.04%, are covered by water.

=== Climate ===
Port Lavaca holds the state record of the highest wind speed ever reached. During Hurricane Carla in September 1961, the winds were recorded to gust up to 170 miles per hour (270 km/h).

In 2004, Port Lavaca, including the South Texas area, recorded up to 12 inches (300 mm) of snowfall.

During Hurricane Harvey in August 2017, Port Lavaca was the location of the peak of the storm surge, which was measured at 6 ft (1.8 m).

Port Lavaca also suffered damage in hurricanes in 1942 and 1945.

Tropical Storm Beta also made landfall on Port Lavaca on late September 2020, causing flooding.

== Demographics ==
Port Lavaca, Texas – Racial and ethnic composition Note: the US Census treats Hispanic/Latino as an ethnic category. This table excludes Latinos from the racial categories and assigns them to a separate category. Hispanics/Latinos may be of any race.
Race / Ethnicity (NH = Non-Hispanic)	Pop 2000	Pop 2010	Pop 2020	% 2000	% 2010	% 2020
White alone (NH)	4,697	4,014	2,957	39.03%	32.77%	25.59%
Black or African American alone (NH)	472	439	303	3.92%	3.58%	2.62%
Native American or Alaska Native alone (NH)	28	17	12	0.23%	0.14%	0.10%
Asian alone (NH)	469	743	974	3.90%	6.07%	8.43%
Native Hawaiian or Pacific Islander alone (NH)	3	4	0	0.02%	0.03%	0.00%
Other race alone (NH)	13	8	20	0.11%	0.06%	0.17%
Mixed race or Multiracial (NH)	81	90	130	0.67%	0.73%	1.12%
Hispanic or Latino (any race)	6,272	6,933	7,161	52.11%	56.61%	61.96%
Total	12,035	12,248	11,557	100.00%	100.00%	100.00%

Historical population
Census	Pop.	Note	%±
1850	315		—
1860	526		67.0%
1870	768		46.0%
1890	365		—
1910	1,699		—
1920	1,212		−28.7%
1930	1,367		12.8%
1940	2,069		51.4%
1950	5,599		170.6%
1960	8,864		58.3%
1970	10,491		18.4%
1980	10,911		4.0%
1990	10,886		−0.2%
2000	12,035		10.6%
2010	12,248		1.8%
2020	11,557		−5.6%
U.S. Decennial Census

=== 2020 census ===
As of the 2020 census, Port Lavaca had a population of 11,557, 4,169 households, and 2,914 families. The median age was 36.5 years; 25.2% of residents were under 18 and 15.7% were 65 or older. For every 100 females, there were 103.6 males, and for every 100 females 18 and over, there were 104.0 males age 18 and over.

About 97.1% of residents lived in urban areas, while 2.9% lived in rural areas.

Of the 4,169 households in Port Lavaca, 36.0% had children under 18 living in them, 45.8% were married-couple households, 22.3% were households with a male householder and no spouse or partner present, and 26.3% were households with a female householder and no spouse or partner present. About 25.3% of all households were made up of individuals and 11.2% had someone living alone who was 65 or older.

The city had 4,781 housing units, of which 12.8% were vacant. The homeowner vacancy rate was 1.0% and the rental vacancy rate was 15.3%.

=== 2000 census ===
As of the 2000 census, 12,035 people, 4,189 households, and 3,133 families were residing in the city. The population density was 1,229.9 inhabitants per square mile (474.9/km^{2}). The 4,791 housing units had an average density of 489.6 per square mile (189.0/km^{2}). The racial makeup of the city was 71.95% White, 4.05% African American, 0.47% Native American, 3.96% Asian, 0.08% Pacific Islander, 16.92% from other races, and 2.58% from two or more races. Hispanics or Latinos of any race were 50.11% of the population.

Of the 4,189 households, 39.0% had children under 18 living with them, 56.5% were married couples living together, 13.7% had a female householder with no husband present, and 10.0% were not families. About 21.2% of all households were made up of individuals, and 8.5% had someone living alone who was 65 or older. The average household size was 2.83 and the average family size was 3.31.

In the city, the age distribution was 30.3% under18, 9.6% from 18 to 24, 28.7% from 25 to 44, 19.3% from 45 to 64, and 12.1% who were 65 or older. The median age was 32 years. For every 100 females, there were 99.2 males. For every 100 females 18 and over, there were 95.8 males. The median income in the city for a household was $33,626 and for a family was $38,250. Males had a median income of $35,526 versus $18,427 for females. The per capita income for the city was $15,431. About 16.8% of families and 20.1% of the population were below the poverty line, including 25.0% of those under 18 and 14.7% of those 65 or over.

== Economy ==
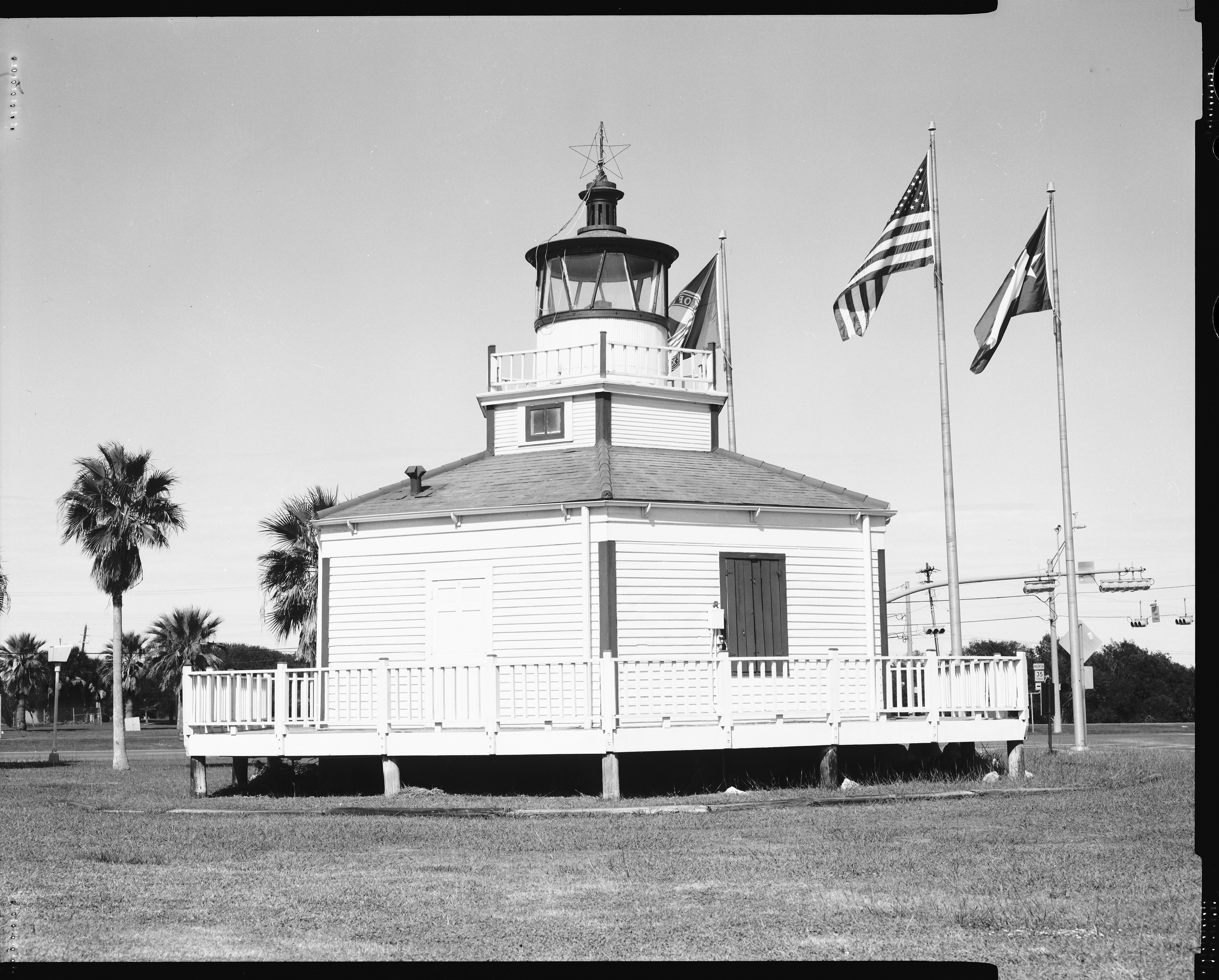
Halfmoon Reef Light

An important economic hub is the Port of Port Lavaca. The city is centrally located between several large manufacturing facilities, including Alcoa, Formosa Plastics, and DuPont, where many Port Lavaca residents work. Fishing is an important part of the local economy, particularly shrimp and oysters. Tourism makes up a small portion of the Port Lavaca economy, as well. "Winter Texans" from colder states and Canada stay in the city's many recreational vehicle and camping parks between October and April.

== Parks and recreation ==
In 2006, two new fishing piers with lighting for night fishermen were constructed in the area. One Port Lavaca pier is located at the eastern end of Main Street in the vicinity of the Nautical Landings Marina. The second, Lighthouse Pier, is located on Hwy 35 at Lavaca Bay. The 6 Mile pier (and boat ramp) is located northwest on FM 1090 about 6 miles (10 km) from the intersection of Hwy 35 and FM 1090 (Virginia Street). Common game fish caught in the area include redfish, speckled trout, flounder, and drum.

Lighthouse Beach at the intersection of Hwy 35 and Lavaca Bay has covered picnic tables, swimming, and a birdwatching trail.

== Education ==
Port Lavaca is served by the Calhoun County Independent School District. Port Lavaca is served by two prekindergarten through fifth grade and excellent special-needs elementary programs: H.J.M Elementary School and Jackson/Roosevelt Elementary School. All residents are zoned to Travis Middle School (grades 6 through 8) and Calhoun High School (9 through 12). Hope High School is another high school, mainly for students with troubled pasts or behavioral issues. Our Lady of the Gulf Catholic school, prekindergarten through grade 8, has also served the county since 1996.

Victoria College has an extension campus at the former Harrison Elementary School campus. Most of the courses offered there are through distance learning and "ITV" television learning from the VC main campus.

== Infrastructure ==
=== Healthcare ===
Memorial Medical Center, which is located in the city of Port Lavaca, is a small hospital that serves the city and county.

=== Transportation ===
Calhoun County Airport, a general aviation airport, is located in unincorporated Calhoun County 5 miles (8 km) northwest of Port Lavaca.

U.S. 87 (Main Street) comes into Port Lavaca from the northwest as a four-lane divided highway, and then narrows down as it runs through Port Lavaca's historic downtown. Via US 87 it is 28 miles (45 km) to Victoria. Texas State Highway 35 is the other major road through Port Lavaca, running generally northeast–southwest through the city. To the northeast it crosses Lavaca Bay via the Port Lavaca Causeway and leads 29 miles (47 km) to Palacios, while to the southwest it leads 82 miles (132 km) to Corpus Christi.

== Notable people ==
- Raymond Butler (born 1956), former NFL wide receiver
- Hope Dworaczyk (born 1984), Playboy magazine's 2010 Playmate of the Year
- Nelva Gonzales Ramos (born 1965), former Texas State District Court judge, currently serving on the United States District Court for the Southern District of Texas
- Steven Saylor (born 1956), writer of historical novels
- Brucene Smith, Miss World USA 1971, Miss U.S. International 1974, Miss International 1974
