= Sargent, Texas =

- Unincorporated community and Census designated place
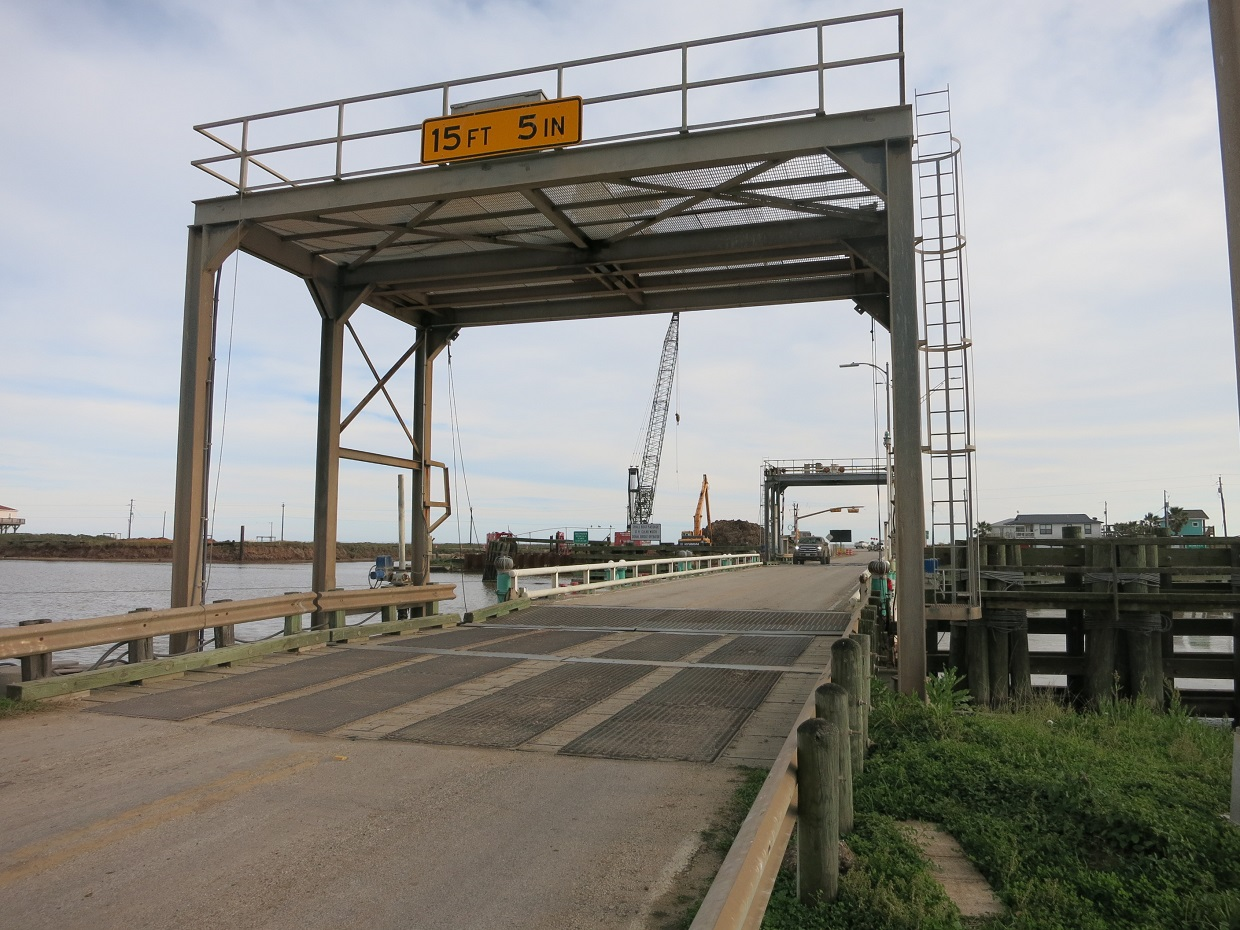
- FM 457 swing bridge at the Intracoastal Waterway
- Interactive map of Sargent, Texas
- Coordinates: 28°50′06″N 95°39′53″W
- Country: United States
- State: Texas
- Counties: Matagorda
- Settled: 1834
- Named for: George Thomas Sargent
- Elevation: 3 ft (0.91 m)

Population (2020)
  - Total: 1,212
- Time zone: UTC-6 (CST)
  - Summer (DST): UTC-5 (CDT)
- ZIP code: 77414
- Area code: 979
- FIPS code: 48321
- GNIS feature ID: 2805811

Sargent is a small unincorporated community located in the eastern corner of Matagorda County, Texas, United States.

Sargent is a fishing, boating, and water sports community with a variable population, as most of its inhabitants are weekend commuters from larger cities such as Houston, Austin, and San Antonio. Sargent is on Farm to Market Road 457, five miles northwest of the Gulf of Mexico and twenty-four miles southeast of Bay City, in the eastern corner of Matagorda County. As of the 2020 census, Sargent had a population of 1,212.

The Sargent area, with its proximity to the Gulf of Mexico, East Matagorda Bay, the Intracoastal Waterway, and Caney Creek, is home base to many commercial and sport fisherman and shrimpers. Red drum (aka Redfish), Spotted Seatrout (aka Speckled Trout), Flounder, Blue Crab and shrimp are among the local favorites.

In addition to the local fishing, one of the unique appeals of Sargent is that many of the homesites are waterfront. Several developments, such as Caney Creek Estates, became established in the late 1950s and early 1960s. Following the widespread damage caused by Hurricane Carla in 1961, other developments such as Downey's Caney Creek, Caney Court, and Caney Creek Haven were established, including new waterfront lots created by the digging of manmade canals off Caney Creek and the Intracoastal Waterway.

Many waterfront lots were originally sold as campsites. Much of Sargent still has a fishing camp influence with many recreational vehicles present, although the majority of developed homesites now have permanent dwellings. Also prevalent are the many private wooden piers and docks, where modern recreational watercraft can be docked. Most piers also have electric fishing lights that allow night fishing, particularly during the colder months where Spotted Seatrout are known to feed as they migrate inland.

Sargent Beach, where multiple rows of beach houses in the 1960s eventually succumbed to continual coastal erosion, has received more attention to preserve what remains of this relatively narrow island bordered by the Gulf of Mexico, the Intracoastal Waterway, Mitchell's Cut into East Matagorda Bay, and the San Bernard River far to the east.

== History ==
Sargent was named for George Thomas Sargent. Sargent and his family relocated to Texas from England in 1834, and established a permanent residence in Matagorda County in 1838, quickly becoming a major land owner in the area. Sargent and his daughter-in-law, Sarah Ann, drowned in a hurricane in 1875. They are buried in a small family cemetery located in Caney Creek Estates and maintained by local residents. The site was awarded a historical marker by the Texas Historical Commission in 1986.

== Geography ==
=== Mitchell's Cut ===
Mitchell's Cut is basically the continuation of Caney Creek. Caney Creek is almost long enough to be a river and has often had brackish water, even a few miles inland. The "Pass" runs into the gulf and is 1/4 mile down the cut, past the entrance to East Matagorda Bay. The "cut" is a favorite fishing site for families, and anglers. Many favorite local boat park onshore, anchor and wade in various fishing spots are in this area, such as "Leroy's Hole." Occasionally, an incoming blue ocean current will run into the 50-foot-wide (15 m) pass at the beach-front for excellent fishing.

The cut also allows boat passage to the gulf for offshore fishing and shrimping, and is vital to the live bait and shrimp sales for the community. The "Cut" (known as the Caney Creek Gulf Cut, or Mitchell's Cut) is the only pass from Freeport to Matagorda and has obvious importance to East Matagorda Bay, Sargent, and the people who live in the general area. The shore line between Sargent's pass is a stretch of land between the gulf and East Matagorda Bay and part of the Matagorda Peninsula. The pass allows for drainage of water from Caney Creek past the Intracoastal Waterway, into the gulf or East Matagorda Bay, especially in times of large rainfall in the drainage basins adjacent to Caney Creek. There are a multitude of shifting tides, water depth, and new sandbars throughout the year. A common problem is a sand bar that runs across the cut about 100 yards out and affects the bigger shrimp boats on a low tide.

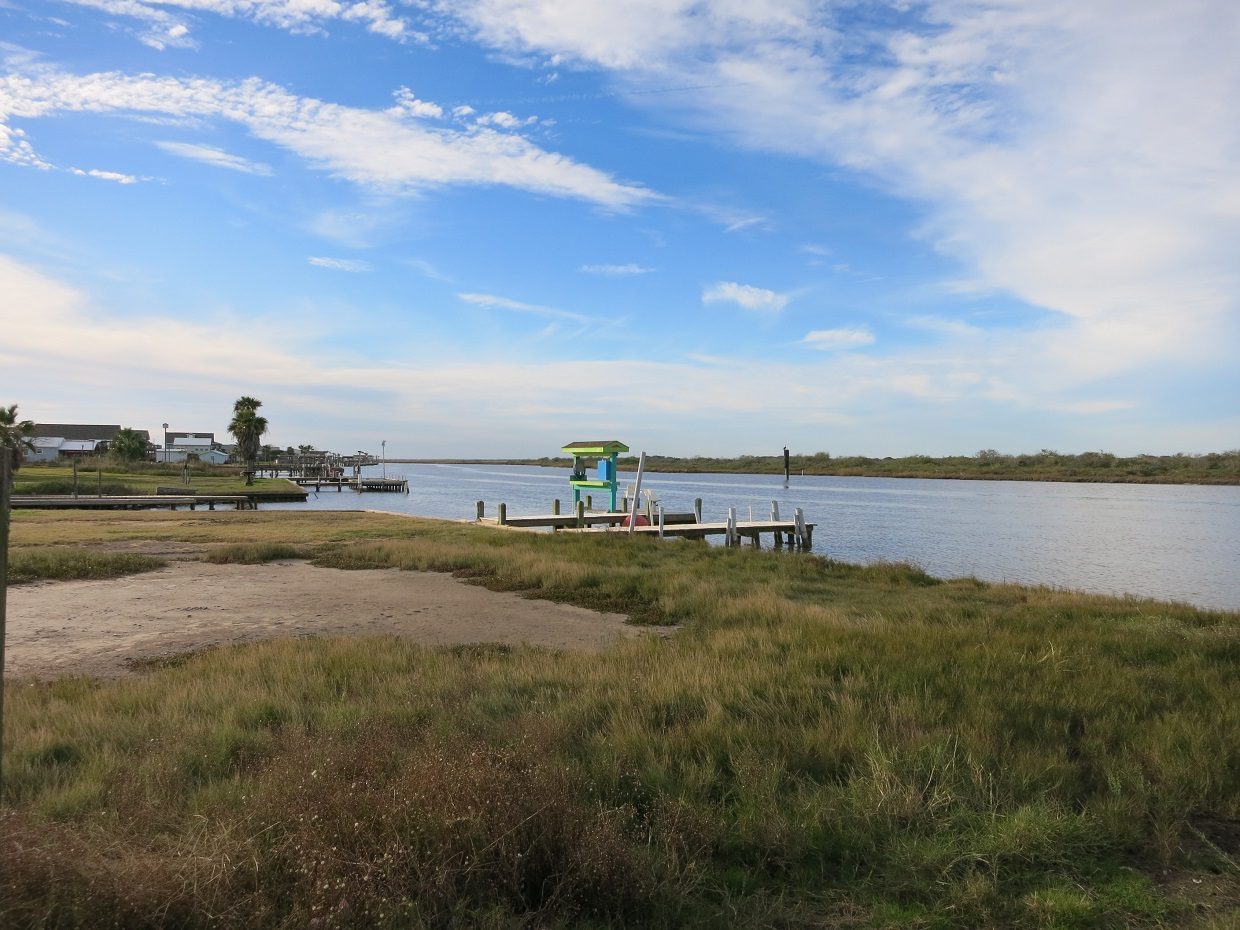
Caney Creek looking downstream at Crab Trap Grill

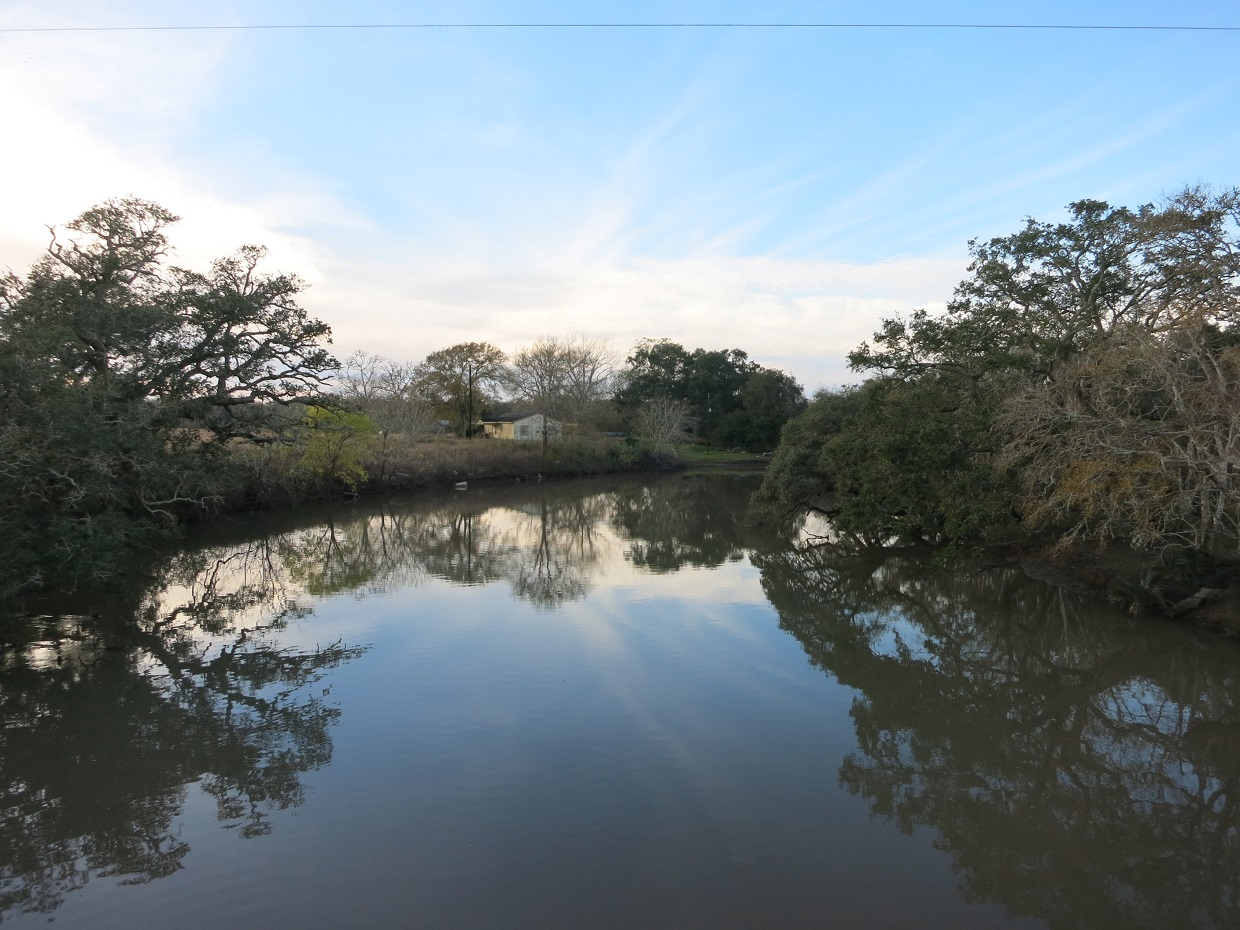
Caney Creek looking upstream at Hawkins Road bridge

== Preservation and development ==
The most notable effort to protect Sargent Beach was obtaining funding for and completing development of a granite breakwater revetment designed and installed by the U.S. Army Corps of Engineers in the early 1990s. This substructure is designed to help prevent coastal erosion and protect inland homes from storm surge in the event of a tropical cyclone making landfall near the area.

In 2013, Coastal Technology Corporation from Austin, Texas, in conjunction with the Conrad Blucher Institute of Texas A&M University-Corpus Christi, received two grants totalling $340,000 from the Port of Bay City Authority to study improving the pass.

In early 2017, construction began on a pier built with concrete pilings extending into the Gulf at Sargent Beach. The pier project, first proposed in 2013, was funded by the federal Coastal Impact Assistance Program (CIAP) and administered by the U.S. Fish and Wildlife Service. The structure was originally designed to be a 10-foot wide pier, extending approximately 500 feet into the Gulf, terminating with a 140 foot wide T-Head. The pier surface was expected to be approximately 17.9 feet above mean low tide. On April 13, 2017, it was announced that construction of the Sargent Fishing Pier would be "temporarily halted", due to lack of funds. This funding cut resulted in the pier coming in short at approximately 180 feet, barely reaching the water at low tide, causing it to be affectionately dubbed by locals "Little Stubby."

== Government ==
Sargent is an unincorporated community under Precinct 2 of Matagorda County.

Sargent has a volunteer fire department, a branch of the Bay City Library, and a community post office.

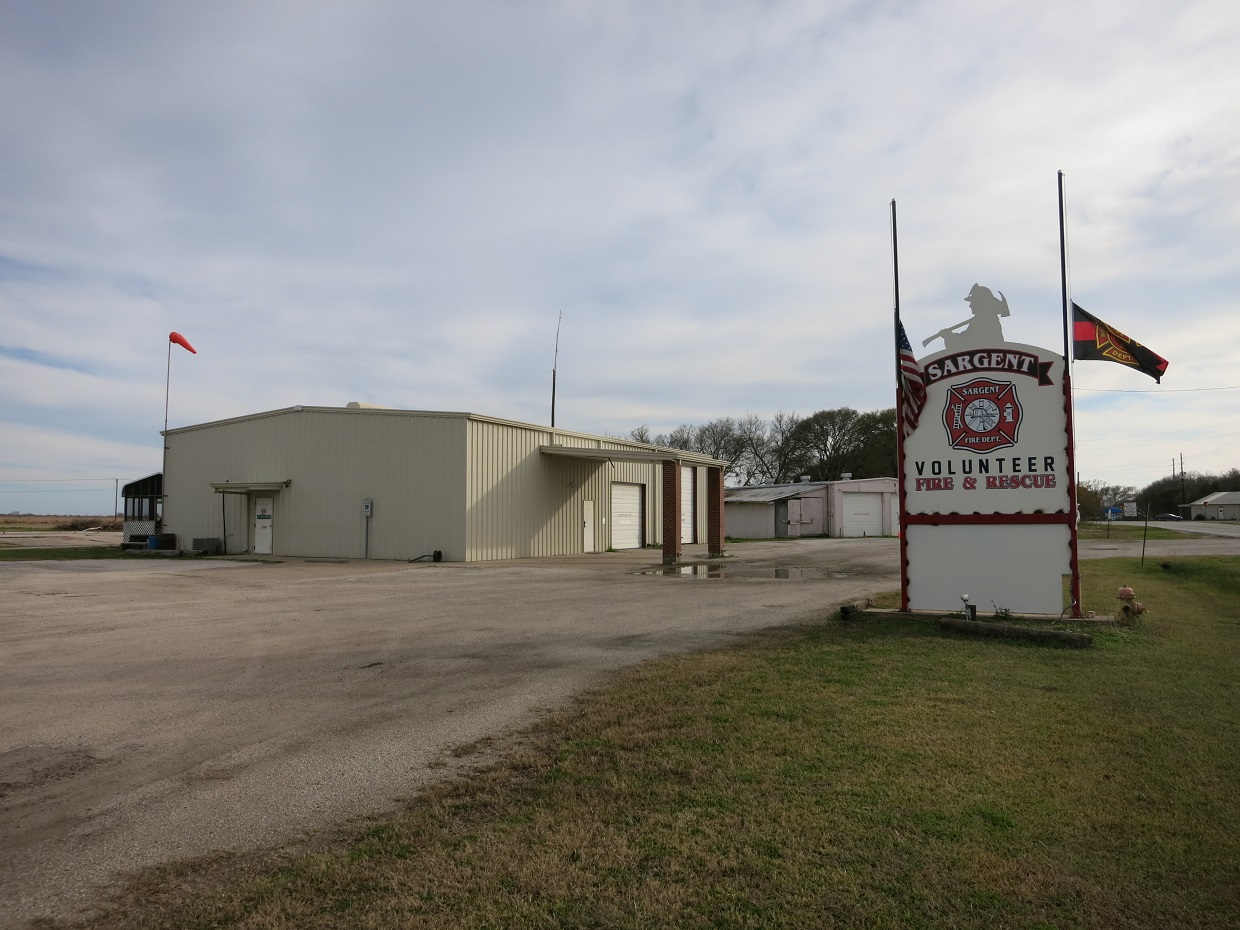
Sargent Volunteer Fire Department is on FM 457.

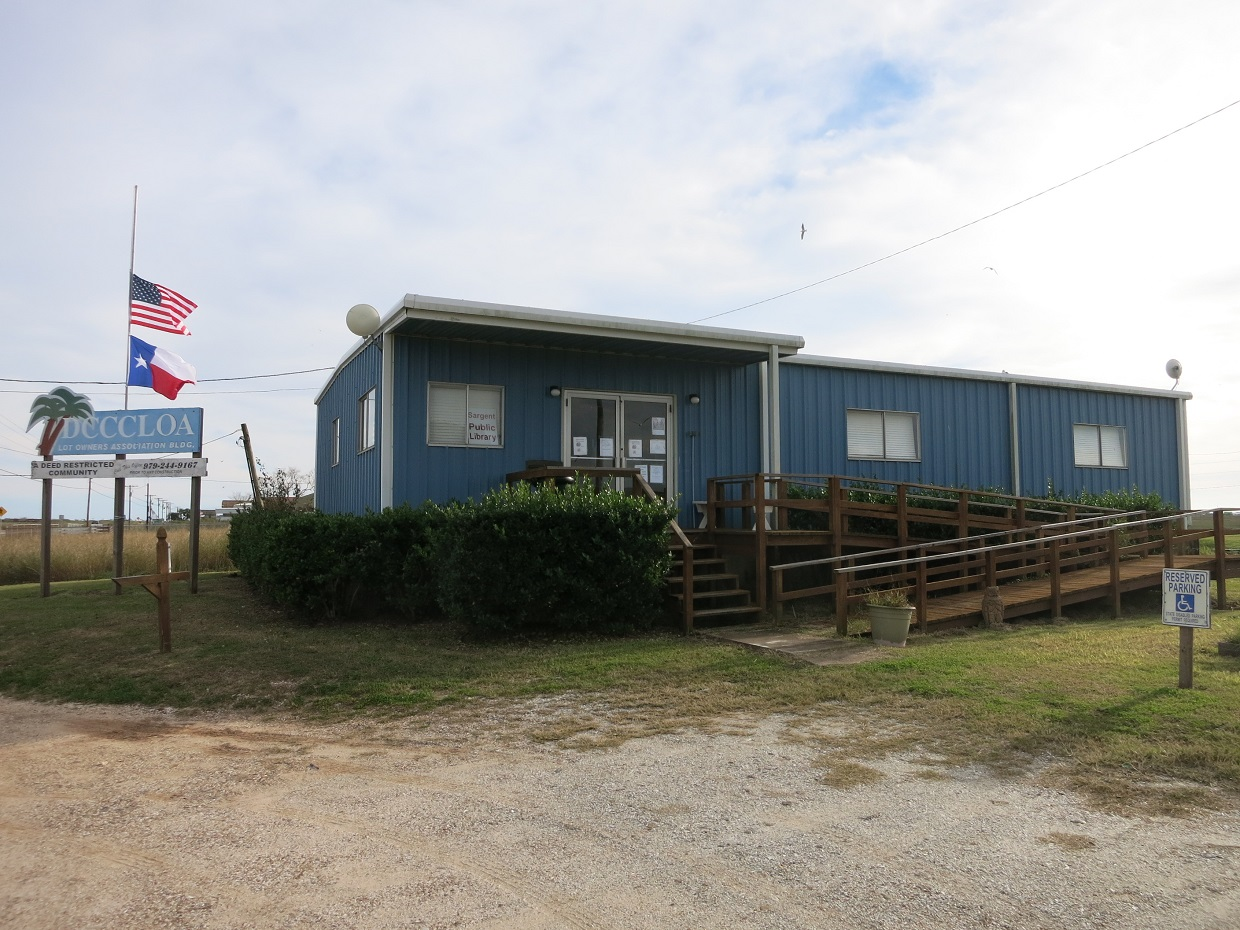
Sargent Branch of the Bay City Library is on FM 457.

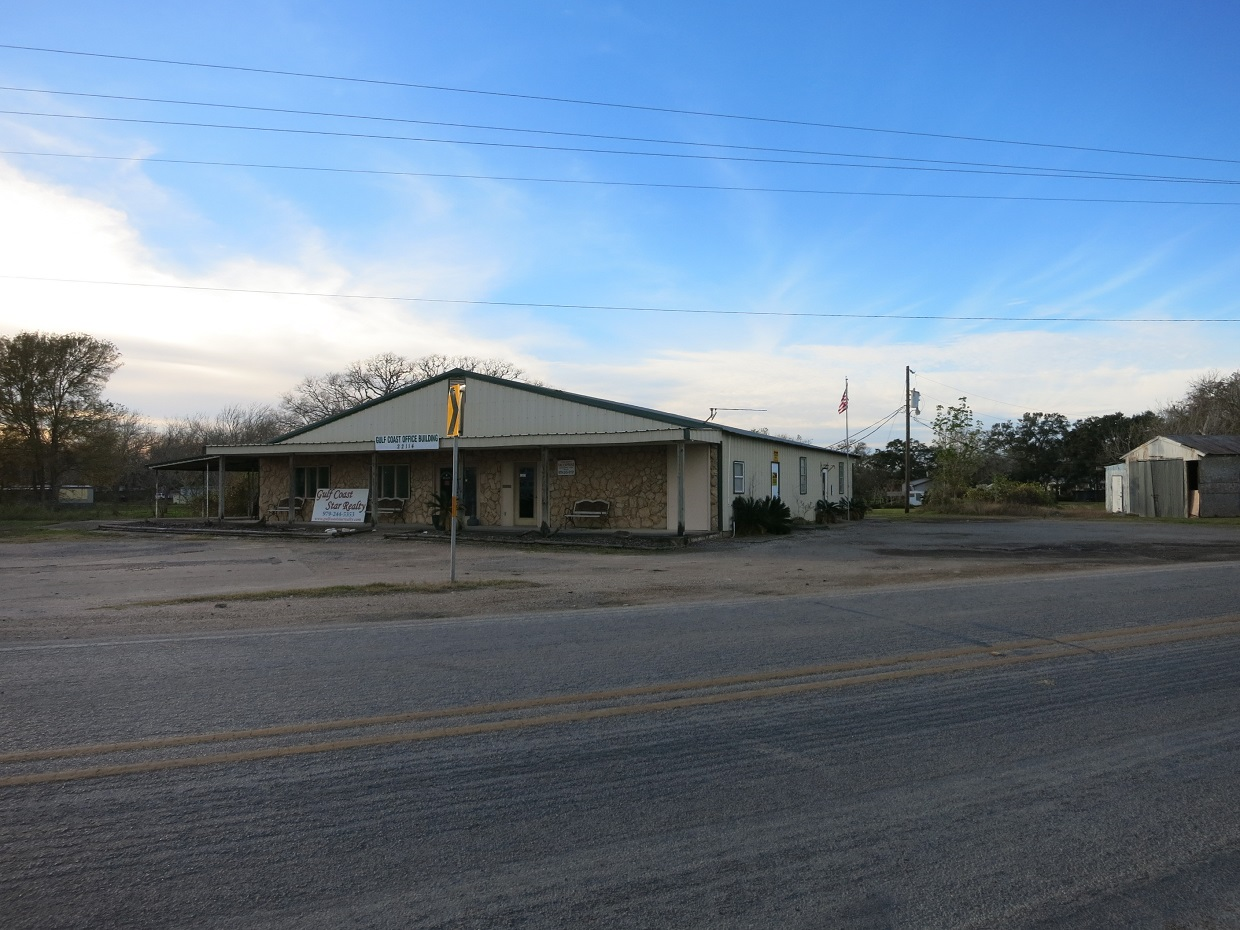
Sargent Community Post Office is in this building.

== Demographics ==
Historical population
Census	Pop.	Note	%±
2020	1,212		—
U.S. Decennial Census; 1850–1900 1910; 1920 1930 1940; 1950 1960 1970; 1980 1990 2000; 2010 2020

Sargent first appeared as a census designated place in the 2020 U.S. census.

=== 2020 Census ===
Sargent CDP, Texas – Racial and ethnic composition Note: the US Census treats Hispanic/Latino as an ethnic category. This table excludes Latinos from the racial categories and assigns them to a separate category. Hispanics/Latinos may be of any race.
Race / Ethnicity (NH = Non-Hispanic)	Pop 2020	% 2020
White alone (NH)	1,039	85.73%
Black or African American alone (NH)	13	1.07%
Native American or Alaska Native alone (NH)	10	0.83%
Asian alone (NH)	8	0.66%
Native Hawaiian or Pacific Islander alone (NH)	0	0.00%
Other race alone (NH)	7	0.58%
Mixed race or Multiracial (NH)	38	3.14%
Hispanic or Latino (any race)	97	8.00%
Total	1,212	100.00%

== Education ==
The community is within the Van Vleck Independent School District.

The designated community college for Van Vleck ISD is Wharton County Junior College.
