= Carancahua Bay =

American bay

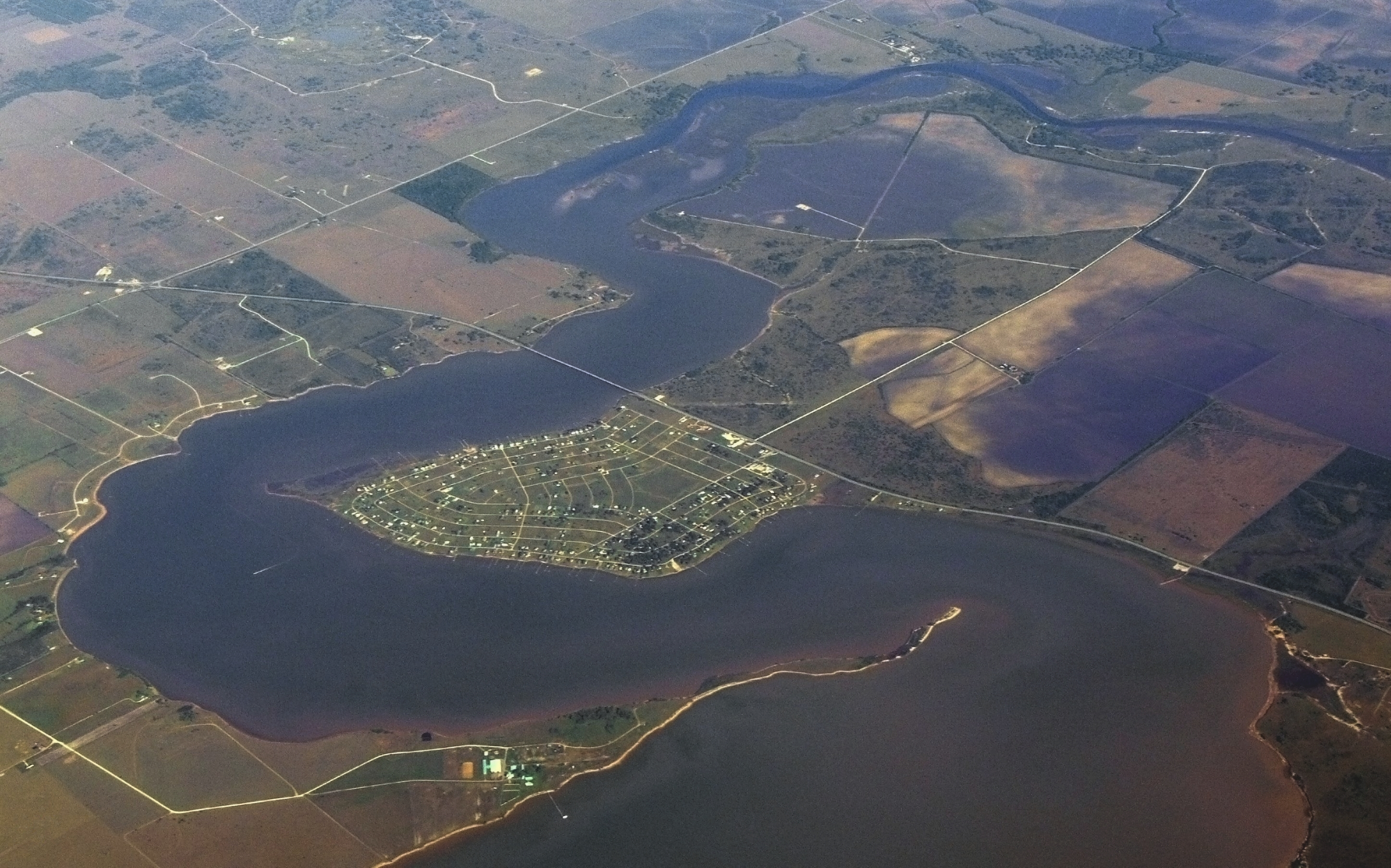
- View of northern Carancahua Bay

- Location within Texas
- Location: Texas Gulf Coast
- Coordinates: 28.691039°N 96.402283°W
- River sources: East Carancahua Creek, West Carancahua Creek
- Ocean/sea sources: Gulf of Mexico
- Basin countries: United States

Carancahua Bay is a northern extension of Matagorda Bay located in Jackson and Calhoun counties in Texas, United States. It is oriented from the southeast to the northwest but meanders as it reaches the north to the confluence with Carancahua Creek watershed. Generally slender, Carancahua Bay is only about 1 mile (1.6 km) in width north of its circular mouth.

This shallow bay serves as a nursery bay for shrimp and as an ecosystem for diverse species of birds and fish. Commercial Fish farms have been established on the east shore. The small communities of Port Alto, Cape Carancahua POA Community, Boca Chica POA Community, and Carancahua Community have been established on the western and eastern shores. Two other small communities, El Campo Beach Community and Schicke Point Community, are located on the south-west shore near the mouth of the Carancahua Bay.

== History ==
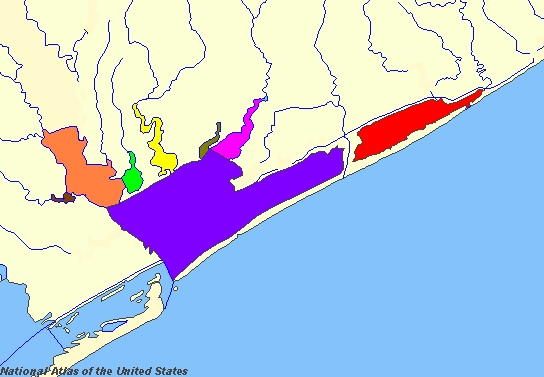
Carancahua Bay (yellow), Chocolate Bay (brown), East Matagorda Bay (red), Keller Bay (lime), Lavaca Bay (orange), Matagorda Bay (purple), Tres Palacios Bay (magenta), Turtle Bay (olive)

The name Carancahua derives from the term that formerly referred to the Karankawa Indians, who resided on its shores. Texas' Spanish Royal Governor, Martín de Alarcón was the first documented European to tour the bay while exploring Matagorda Bay with Tejas guides in 1718. During the expedition, two Karankawa Indians were spotted near the bay going about their daily lives and were frightened at the sight of Alarcón and his men. They quickly swam across the bay despite the guides' signal to them that Alarcón meant no harm. The next day, the Indians came ashore from a sixteen-passenger canoe (which could hold 4 men, 4 women and 8 children) and notified the Tejas guide that they wished for Alarcón and his men to leave. As a peace offering, Alarcón presented the Indians with tobacco and clothing on behalf of the Spanish crown, which they accepted. In exchange, the Indians offered Alarcón dried fish, and directed him toward the former French fort of St. Louis, believing Alarcón wanted to establish a colony on the bay. Alarcón declared the bay for Spain, but did not establish a permanent settlement.

Only a handful of settlements have been established on the bay. The town of Carancahua first formed as a small collection of cabins that were used in the 1880s as a stop for mail between Texana and Matagorda. However, the bay's propensity for flooding and malaria prevented growth. In fact, the bay was notorious for its swarms of mosquitos that would fly from the Colorado River delta, and documented by a late 19th-century rancher:

A fairly strong easterly wind had been blowing for three days; on the evening of the third day, the mosquitos arrived, flying high, about fifty feet, and looking like a cloud of mist over Carancahua Bay. At the ranch, they set everything on fire that had blood in it, and all work was suspended by unanimous consent...little or nothing was done for nearly five days; by this time the main body had passed, though plenty remained to make everything uncomfortable for about two weeks. This migration was from east to west and the line was about three miles wide.

Approximately 50 people lived at Carancahua in 1915, but the population dwindled to 25 in the next decade. The town remains a community, but the current population is unknown. Across the bay, a settlement of about ten permanent residents, initially known as Persimmon Point, was renamed Port Alto in 1939. The town grew, attracting retirees and vacationers who contributed to a peak summer population of 205 in 1961. Hurricane Carla destroyed the town in September 1961, but it was rebuilt five years later. In 1970, a beachfront was constructed along the shoreline as the listed population reached 170 people. The 2000 census reported that 45 people lived in the town. The original Schicke Point was home to a small ranching and farm operation. The name derives from an original resident of the point (Clarence Schicke) who came from Illinois as a game hunter and fisherman for local restaurants. After Hurricane Carla destroyed the ranch home and operations, C. Schicke turned to commercial fishing and building small cabins in the area. Schicke Point is located near the mouth of Carancahua Bay at Carancahua Pass and is a location attractive to sports fishermen. The village has approximately 90 residents, including legendary anglers Roy Cross (1924–2009), Otto Mendel (1913–2008), and fishing spoon expert Robert Cross. Cape Carancahua is a gated residential community, located on the bay's northern shore.

== Features ==
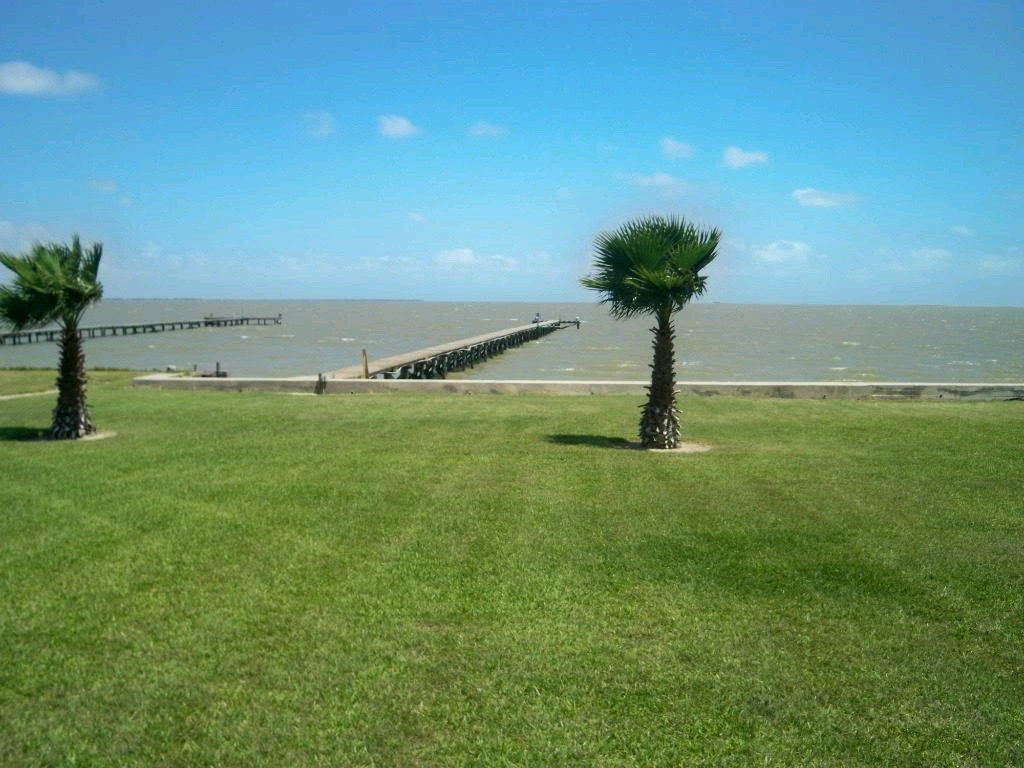
Bayfront of Carancahua Bay from Port Alto

The bay has two extensions near its mouth with Matagorda Bay at Carancahua Pass, including Redfish Lake to the southwest and Salt Lake, just above the former. On the bay's eastern shore, the mouth is headed by Schicke Point, which curves north to the Schicke Point Community, where several private piers are located. About one mile (1.6 km) inland from the community's shoreline are the Piper Lakes. North from the Schicke Point Community, the El Campo Club Community is found, with several residences on a straight line along the coast with docks stretched into the water. Further north, the bay takes a sharp turn to the west past a wetland area then heads north and becomes more slender as it passes from Calhoun into Jackson County. The shoreline continues north and passes several oil wells to Boca Chica POA Community, where a few piers are scattered along the shore. Just north of the Boca Chica POA Community, a small inlet is formed, at the base of which, the Fivemile Draw is found. To the north of Fivemile Draw is Carancahua Community, where several docks line the shore and continue until the bay winds to the west to a large wetland. Past the wetland, the width of the bay shrinks and continues southward along the shore of the Cape Carancahua POA Community, surrounded by water on three sides. Past the cape, the bay turns to the north and is crossed by Texas State Highway 35. It then heads west and north again, while gradually becoming narrower until it reaches the marsh at the mouth of Carancahua Creek. The East and West Carancahua Creeks, which merge before their confluence, feed the bay. West Carancahua Creek runs 28 miles (45 km) south from its source near White Hall Community, near Ganado, Texas to meet with East Carancahua Creek, which runs southwest for 32 miles (51 km) from its source in southern Wharton County. Both streams are intermittent in their upper reaches. The western shore mimics the shape of the east. As it moves south of the Carancahua Creek mouth, Weedhaven is formed, south of which, the shore counters Cape Carancahua and heads northeast past several oil wells to a sharp point. The shoreline continues directly south until it reaches a large swamp. Past the swamp is the town of Port Alto, where several docks and piers are located.

== Ecosystem ==
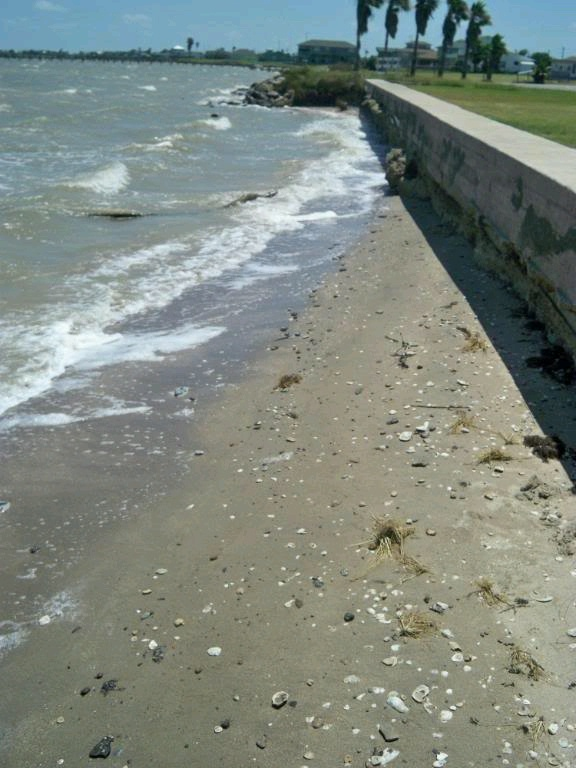
Beach of sand and shell on the shore of Carancahua Bay

Carancahua Bay is protected by the State of Texas and locally by the 300-member Carancahua Bay Protection Association. It is a nursery bay for shrimp, and is a habitat for shellfish including oysters. Finfish such as the redfish and black drum are commonly caught from the bay by recreational fishermen. Birds common to the bay include the wood ibis, roseate spoonbill, snowy egret, great-tailed grackle, Louisiana heron, willet, black-necked stilt, crested caracara and the black vulture.

During a 2004 assessment of Texas waterways, the Texas Commission on Environmental Quality found higher than normal levels of bacteria at the mouth of Carancahua Creek and alkaline pH levels, symptomatic of algal bloom. The issues discovered by the commission were common in the water bodies examined for the study, and they noted that such issues would be addressed.

== Industry ==
The bay is off limits to shrimping due to its legal status as a nursery, however shrimp farms have been established and approved along its shores. The harvest of shellfish, particularly oysters, is heavily regulated, but allowed at certain times and places. Whereas the main Matagorda Bay is an approved area for shellfish production, Carancahua Bay is divided between restricted and conditionally approved areas. The Texas Department of State Health Services described the areas conditionally approved as being from the mouth of the bay to a "beige house" on the eastern shore and cutoff across to a "grey barn" on the western shore, save for a small sliver of water that includes most of the shoreline of Port Alto, which is restricted. All areas north of the diagonal line are restricted as well.

Several oil and natural gas wells are scattered throughout the shoreline and a few are included in the waters of Carancahua Bay. The most notable include the wells of the Appling Field segment, a mile offshore from Port Alto, which is believed to contain 33 billion cubic feet (0.93 billion cubic meters) of natural gas. The field was first discovered in the 1950s, but later abandoned. Brigham Exploration is working with Royale Energy to develop ten reserves in the area, spotted during a seismic survey.
