= Matagorda Ship Channel =

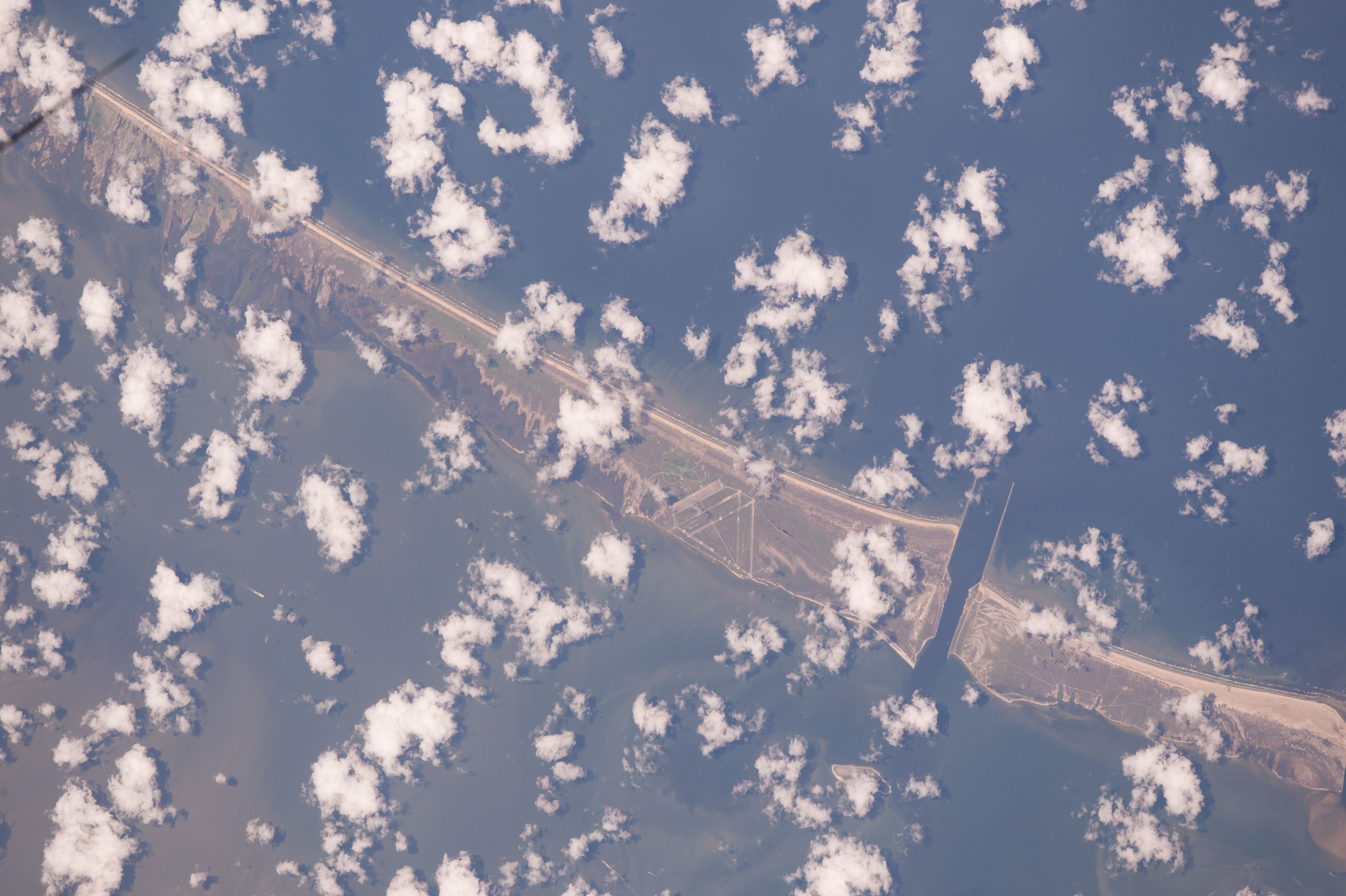
- Satellite image of Matagorda Ship Channel

- Location of Matagorda Ship Channel Matagorda Ship Channel (the United States)
- Location: Matagorda Peninsula; Matagorda Bay, Texas
- Country: United States
- Coordinates: 28.430°N 96.332°W

Specifications
- Length: 3.22 km (2.00 miles)
- Maximum boat length: 810 ft (250 m)
- Maximum boat beam: 42.06 m (138 ft 0 in)
- Maximum boat draft: 50 ft (15 m)
- Navigation authority: Calhoun Port Authority
- Topo Map: Matagorda Ship Channel (Map).

History
- Construction began: 1962
- Date completed: 1966

Geography
- Direction: North
- Start point: Texas Gulf Coast
- End point: Matagorda Bay
- Connects to: Lavaca Bay
- GNIS feature ID: 1381067

The Matagorda Ship Channel is a channel constructed between 1962 and 1966 that allows ocean-going vessels to travel between the Gulf of Mexico and Matagorda Bay. The channel is part of the Port of Port Lavaca – Point Comfort, a major sea port in the U.S. state of Texas.

== See also ==
Aframax
Cargo Ship Capacity
List of Panamax ports
Panamax
