= East Matagorda Bay =

Estuary bay in Matagorda County, Texas

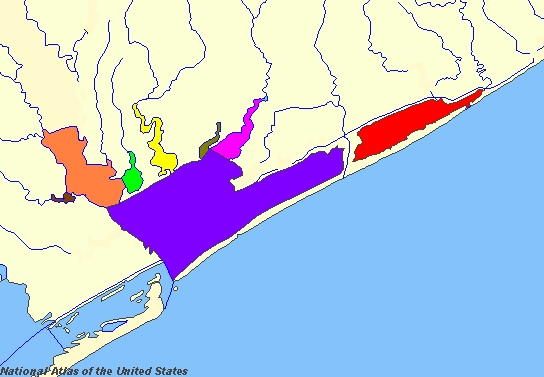
- Carancahua Bay (yellow), Chocolate Bay (brown), East Matagorda Bay (red), Keller Bay (lime), Lavaca Bay (orange), Matagorda Bay (purple), Tres Palacios Bay (magenta), Turtle Bay (olive)

- Location within Texas
- Location: Texas Gulf Coast
- Coordinates: 28°43′N 95°49′W
- Ocean/sea sources: Gulf of Mexico
- Basin countries: United States
- Surface area: 37,810 acres (15,300 ha)

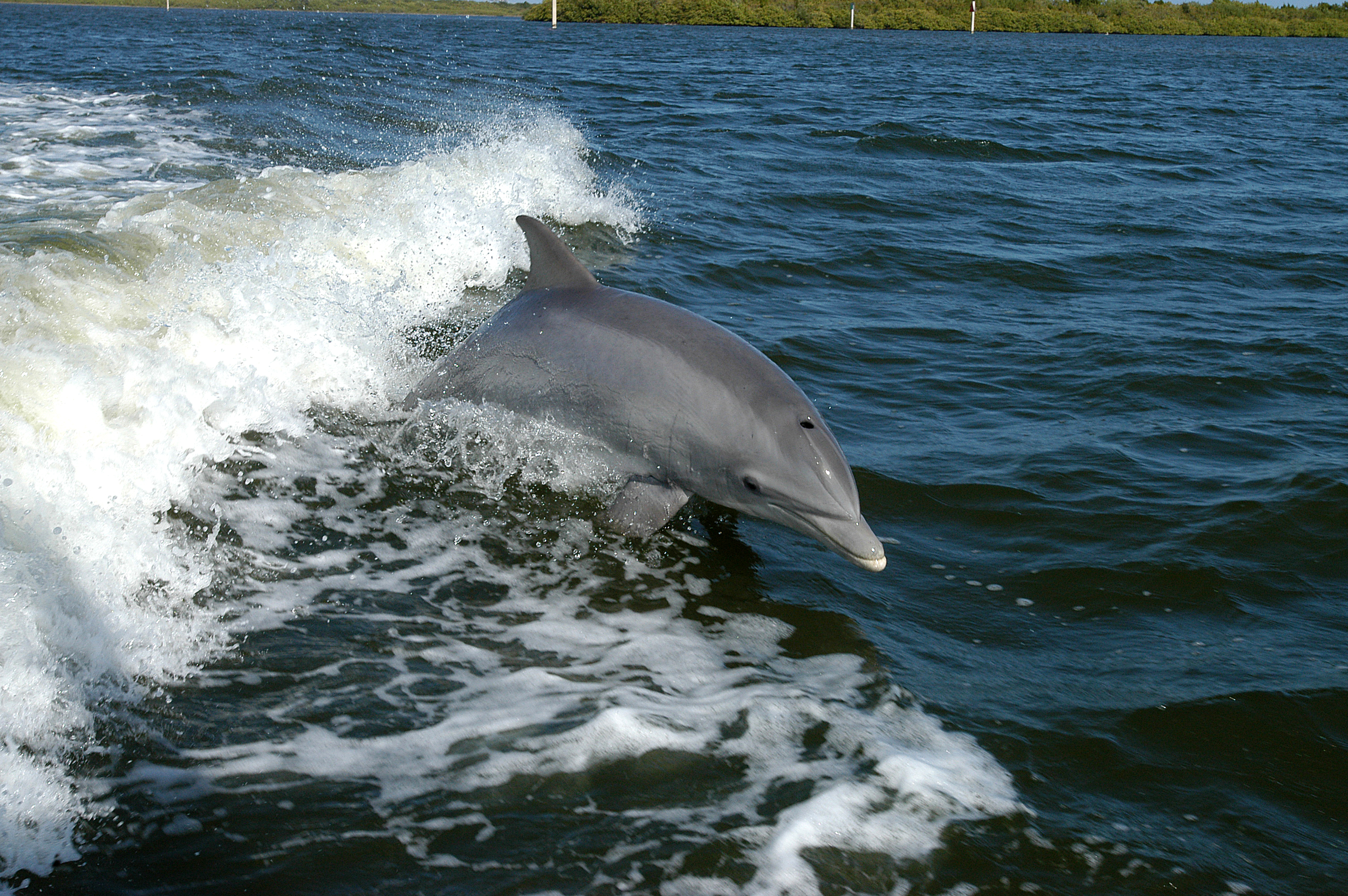
Common Bottlenose Dolphin riding the wake of a boat's waves.

East Matagorda Bay is located off Matagorda County on the Texas Gulf Coast (at 28°43' N, 95°49' W), enclosed by the Matagorda Peninsula and the tidal flats at the mouth of the Colorado River. It is a minor estuary, one of a series of estuaries along the Gulf Coast of Texas, but it has no significant river sources, receiving only the runoff from the adjacent coastal watershed. Its only true opening to the Gulf of Mexico is through Brown Cedar Cut, near the north end of the peninsula. East Matagorda Bay was devastated by the 1942 Matagorda Hurricane, the most devastating hurricane of the 1942 Atlantic hurricane season.

It is part of the Matagorda Bay system, the third largest estuarine system in the state of Texas.

== Ecosystem ==
East Matagorda Bay's ecosystem is home to many different species of marine and freshwater fish. Freshwater species of fish include black bass, temperate bass, catfish, crappie, redbreast sunfish, carp, minnows, gar, and buffalo fish. Marine fish may be in different areas of the bay that include open water of the Gulf of Mexico or shallow water or estuaries closer to shore. These species include Catfish, Atlantic Croaker, southern flounder, pinfish, mullet, eel, drum, sea trout, tarpon, amberjack, pompano, common snook, jack crevalle, Tripletail, cobia, and snapper species. Other species of animals that reside in the bay include Eastern Brown Pelican, Crab species, American Alligator, and different turtle species.

Texas's East Matagorda Bay also includes a wide variety of plant species and vegetation either in the coastal wetlands or on solid land. East Matagorda Bay also is considered a coastal marshland as there is a large absence of trees in bay. Some submerged salt water grasses that appear off the coast of the bay include shoal grass, widgeon grass, and turtle grass. Some mainland plants include the common sunflower, many different rose species, milkweed, many fern species, maple saplings and trees, and many other different flower and tall grass species. Close to the coast, there are many different types of grasses and shrubs that grow in the salty environment. Panicgrass, ryegrass, Gulf coast Yucca plants, and cutgrass are some of the most common plant life species that are apparent in the East Matagorda Bay area.

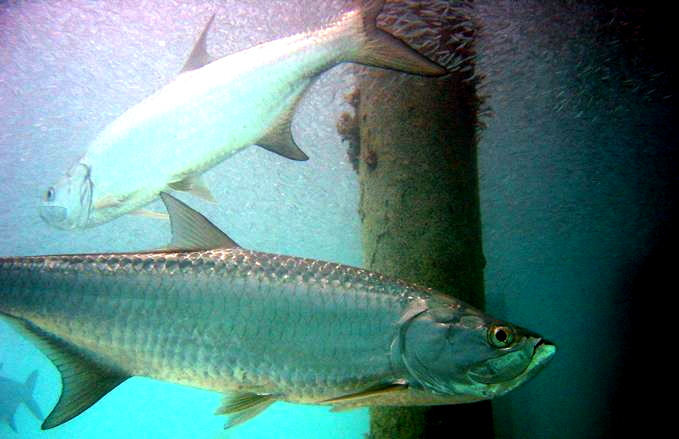
Atlantic Tarpon reside in the Gulf of Mexico off the coast of East Matagorda Bay near shallow water structure.

== Controversy ==
In early January 1990, the carcasses of twenty-three Tursiops truncatus (Common Bottlenose Dolphin) were discovered off the inland coastline of East Matagorda Bay, TX. There were few cases that reported dead or live Common Bottlenose Dolphins in East Matagorda Bay, before and after the mass die-off. Natural causes and weather patterns prior to the findings of the dolphins were the most probable cause. In December 1989, Texas went through a number of arctic outbreaks, reaching lows of two degrees Fahrenheit. Additionally, engineering programs such as the dredging of Mitchell's Cut, meant to provide flood relief at the time, ended up altering points of access between East Matagorda Bay and the Gulf of Mexico. The effects of these programs could have been a factor to the deaths.
