= Ashby, Texas =

Unincorporated community in Texas, US

Ashby
- Unincorporated community
- Location in Texas
- Coordinates: 28.8291519°N 96.1241303°W
- Country: United States
- State: Texas
- County: Matagorda
- Elevation: 30 ft (9 m)

Ashby is an unincorporated community in Matagorda County, Texas, United States.

== History ==
Situated near Farm to Market Road 1095 and by Tres Palacios River, the area was originally a resting place for the Karankawa. The area was settled by colonists by c. mid-1800s, with a church dated to 1869. In 1890, Captain W. W. Moore—an American Civil War veteran in Terry's Texas Rangers—established a store, and a post office opened in the community the same year. Moore named it Ashby, for a military officer he served under.

A popular docking site for freighters, Ashby continued growing through the rest of the 19th century. It was primarily agricultural and its main crop was grain. By 1914, 150 people lived in Ashby. Ashby's post office operated until 1919, before being rerouted to nearby Blessing. During the 1970s, a subdivision called Tres Palacios Oaks saw development across the Tres Palacios, and as of 2000, sixty people lived in the town.
