= Lavaca Bay =

Body of water in Calhoun County, Texas, United States

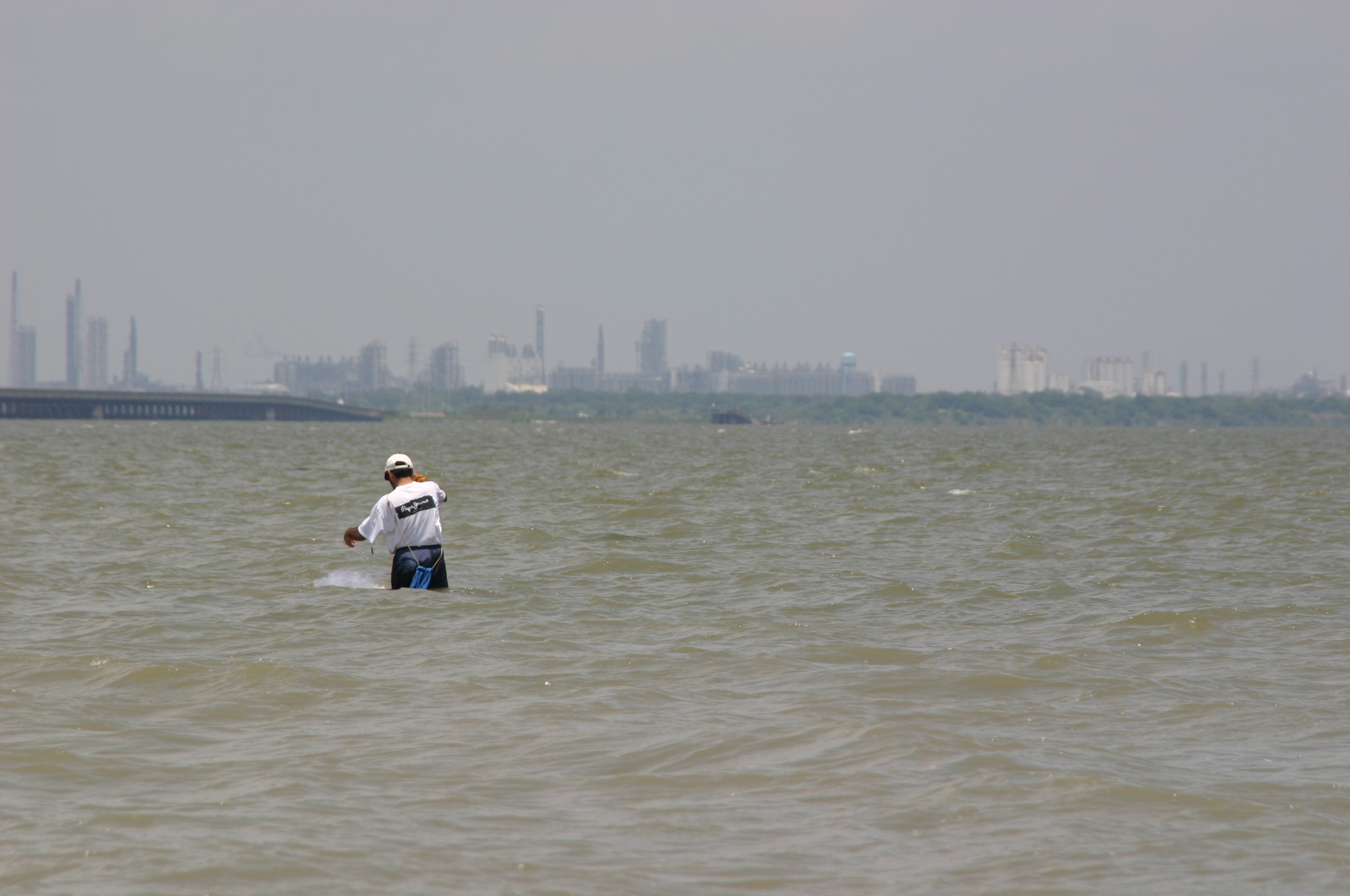
- Lavaca Bay toward Point Comfort

- Location within Texas
- Location: Texas Gulf Coast
- Coordinates: 28.624761°N 96.584759°W
- River sources: Lavaca River, Garcitas Creek
- Ocean/sea sources: Gulf of Mexico
- Basin countries: United States
- Settlements: Port Lavaca, Point Comfort

Lavaca Bay (/ləvˈɑːkə/) is a northwestern extension of the Matagorda Bay system found mostly in Calhoun County, Texas, United States. The ports of Port Lavaca and Point Comfort have been established on the bay, and are the main areas of human habitation. Linnville was located on the bay until its abandonment after the Great Raid of 1840, and the major port of Indianola was found near the confluence with the main Matagorda Bay, until the town's final destruction following the massive hurricane of 1886. Smaller communities include Olivia, Alamo Beach and Magnolia Beach. Lavaca Bay is approximately 82 miles (130 km) northeast of Corpus Christi, about 121 miles (190 km) southwest of Houston, and 145 miles (230 km) southeast of San Antonio.

In the late 1680s, French explorer René-Robert Cavelier, Sieur de La Salle built a colony dubbed Fort St. Louis in this area. A June 1996 dig at the site that was believed to be the correct location revealed eight French cannon. This led archeologists to excavate the Keeran Ranch site in the area, during 1996–2002; they concluded that the Spanish Presidio La Bahía fort "was built on the La Salle settlement". Some 10 percent of the artifacts recovered are believed to have originated in France.

The bay is noted for its superfund site, caused by mercury pollution from the heavy industry in Point Comfort (specifically Alcoa), across the bay from the largest settlement of Port Lavaca. Although fishing has declined in recent years due to fears of contamination, the bay supports a large finfish population, and the efforts of environmental organizations and the federal government have pressured Alcoa to reduce the polluted areas.

== History ==
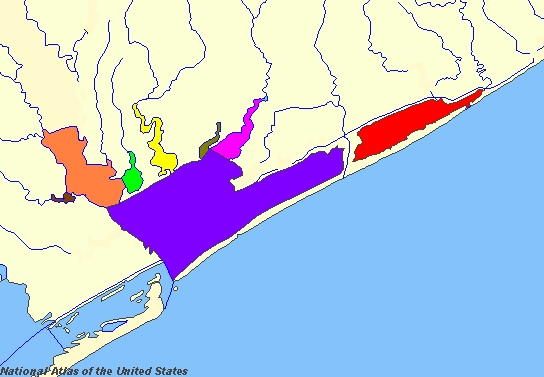
Carancahua Bay (yellow), Chocolate Bay (brown), East Matagorda Bay (red), Keller Bay (lime), Lavaca Bay (orange), Matagorda Bay (purple), Tres Palacios Bay (magenta), Turtle Bay (olive)

Lavaca Bay was formed when the sea level rose following the last ice age, flooding the Lavaca River-Garcitas Creek basin. The name comes from the Spanish adaptation of the French vache or cow, given to the area by French explorer René-Robert Cavelier, Sieur de La Salle for the sightings of Plains Bison, which were once common near the bay and the creeks that feed it. It is believed La Salle established his Fort St. Louis colony near the bay on Garcitas Creek. The first sizable human settlement on the bay shore was at the town of New Port, established in 1831 by Irish merchant John J. Linn as part of De León's colony. The site was later renamed Linnville, and grew to a population of 200 by 1839. It was described as "a place of considerable business" in Sketches of Texas in 1840, and was used extensively during the early years of the Republic of Texas. Future San Antonio Mayor Samuel Maverick owned a warehouse in the town, along with many other prominent Texans. The town was destroyed during the Great Raid of 1840, orchestrated by the Comanche Indians, and was later abandoned.

Port Lavaca or Lavaca, developed after the abandonment of Linnville. It grew substantially following the destruction of Indianola, and became a prominent shipping location and national leader in shrimp production. Across the bay and currently connected by Texas State Highway 35, the town of Point Comfort is found. It was incorporated in 1953 at a citywide vote and is known for its large aluminium and petrochemical plants built in the 1960s. The small town of Olivia, which was founded in 1892 as a Swedish Lutheran community, is located on the shores of Keller Bay. The unincorporated towns of Alamo Beach, established around 1900, and Magnolia Beach, founded sometime thereafter, and named for the Magnolia figs produced in the area, are found north of the remains of the ghost town of Indianola.

== Features ==
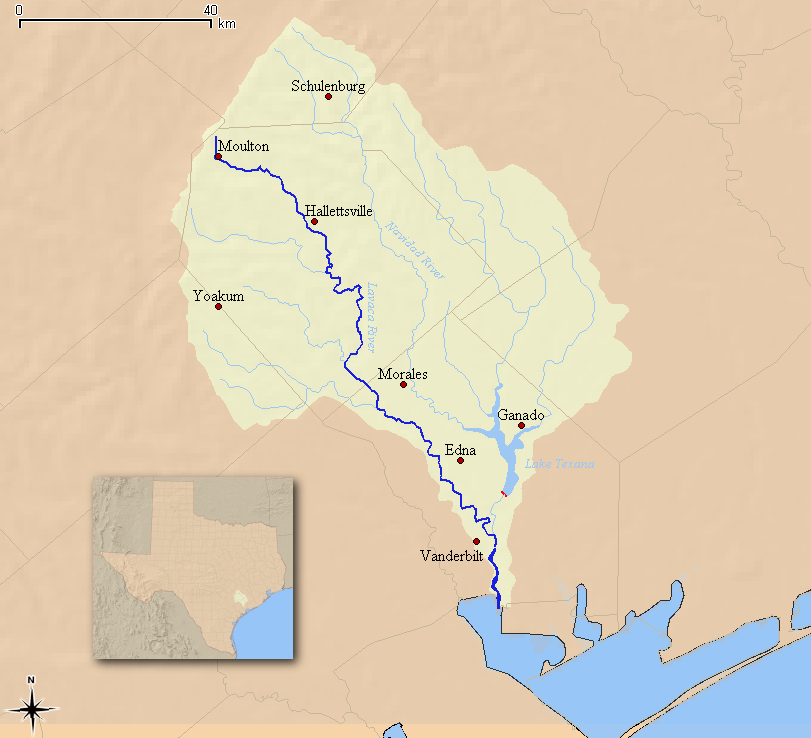
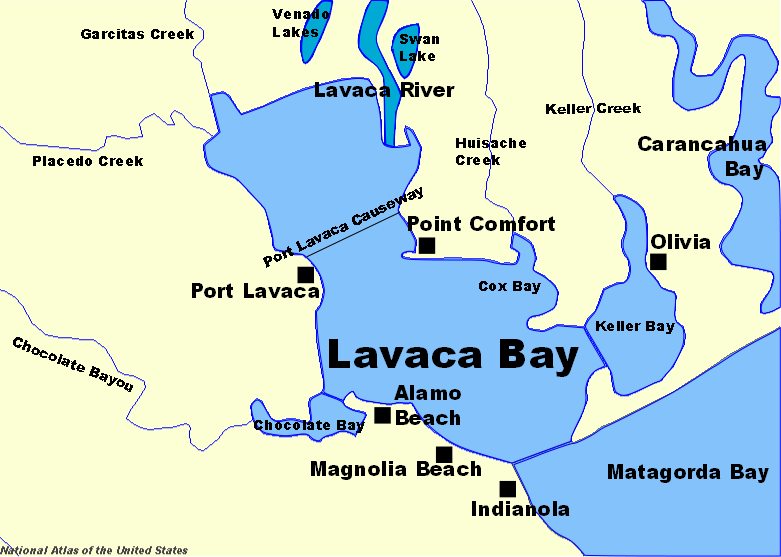
Watershed of the Lavaca River (left) into Lavaca Bay (right)

Lavaca Bay is the largest extension of the Matagorda Bay system and includes its own extensions of Chocolate Bay to the southwest, Cox Bay to the east, and Keller Bay to the southeast. The Lavaca River as well as Garcitas Creek and Venado Creek supply the bay with fresh water from the north. Channels have been dredged to connect the bay to the Intracoastal Waterway, which runs to the south. On average, the bay is about 4 feet (1 m) in depth.

Unlike most of the Matagorda Bay system, Lavaca Bay has a mostly muddy bottom with large amounts of oyster reefs and spoils islands formed by the dredging of several canals. The shores are lined with grassy bluffs and a thick cover of trees. The Lavaca River enters near the Port Lavaca Causeway as it traverses Lavaca Bay from Port Lavaca to Point Comfort at the center of the bay, which is also its narrowest width. The river flows 115 miles (190 km) southeast from its source in northeast Gonzales County, draining approximately 2,280 square miles (5,900 km^{2}) into Lavaca Bay. South of the Port Lavaca Causeway in Point Comfort, on the bay's eastern shore, a heavy industrial sector is located, which lines the coast to Cox Bay, which extends to the east. South of Cox Bay is the larger Keller Bay extension, which extends the bay to its easternmost point near Olivia. Below the extension, is a narrow peninsula, bounded by Matagorda Bay to the south, which extends west to the mouth of Lavaca Bay. Across the mouth on the western shore, past the Matagorda Ship Channel, which runs through the middle of the bay to Point Comfort, the town of Magnolia Beach is found. To the northwest is the town of Alamo Beach, located on Gailinipper Point, from which a major oyster reef begins across the bay to Point Comfort. The point is located on the northeastern extreme of a headland that juts to the north, forming Chocolate Bay to the west. Port Lavaca is found north of Chocolate Bay, back at the Port Lavaca Causeway. North of the causeway is a large circular extension, forming the northern boundary of the Lavaca Bay. The northwestern extreme is formed by Garcitas Cove, fed by Garcitas Creek, which flows 48 miles (77 km) from its source in DeWitt County. To the east is Venado Creek, which converges with the bay, northwest of the mouth of the Lavaca River.

== Ecosystem ==
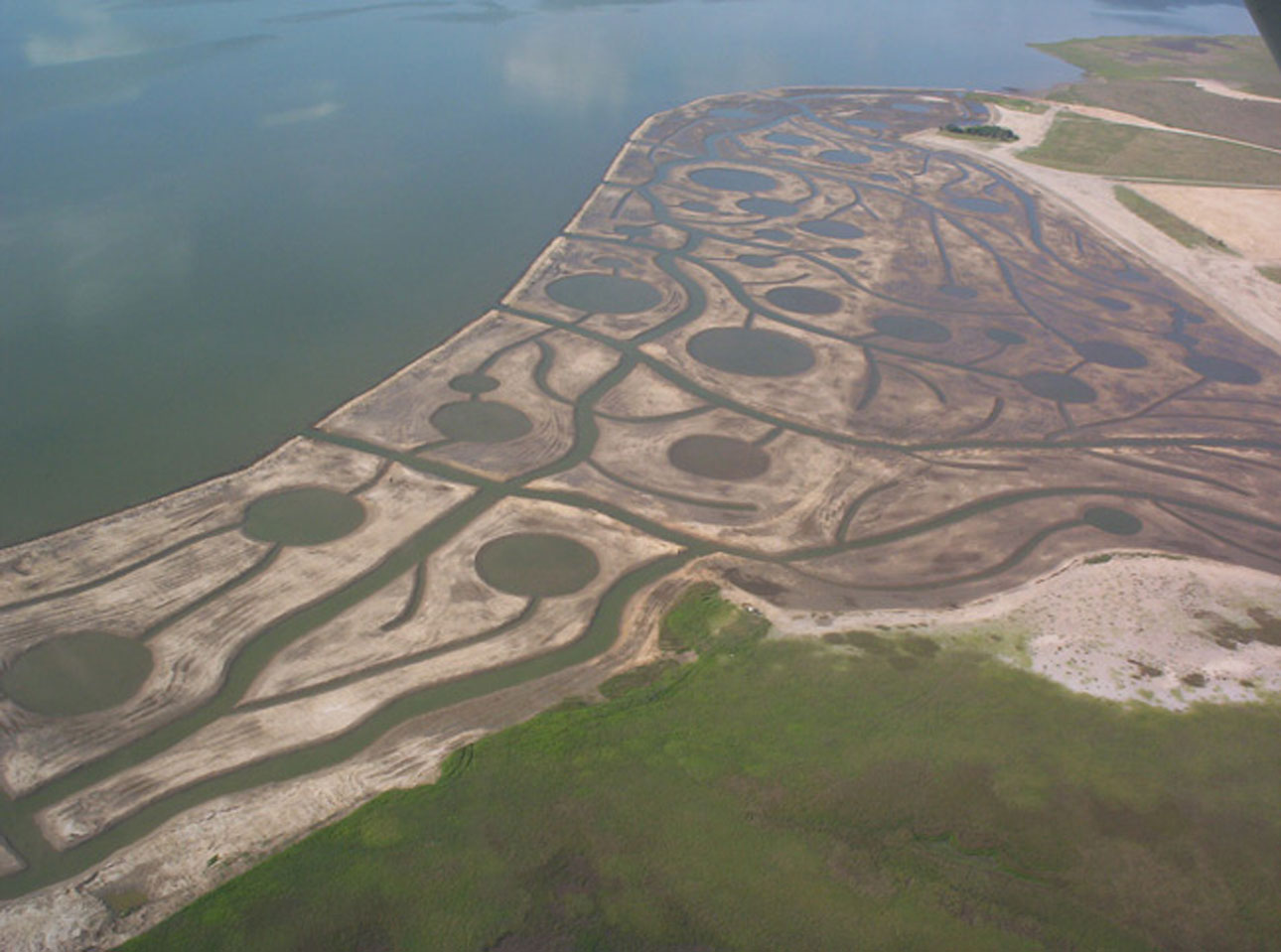
Additional salt marsh added to the bay

Lavaca Bay hosts a wide range of finfish including Black drum, Flounder, Redfish, Sheepshead and Speckled trout, however it suffers from mercury pollution. An Alcoa plant in Point Comfort dumped an estimated 67 pounds (30 kg) of mercury into the bay per day in the 1960s, affecting 64 square miles (170 km^{2}). A mercury superfund was established at the site, and the processing of oysters and blue crab in certain locations was prohibited. A study revealed that the bay's detritus is more than ten times as contaminated as nearby Keller Bay.

The pollution issue is a main concern of citizens of Calhoun County, and has attracted demonstrations against industry in Point Comfort. However, Alcoa has worked with state and federal officials, spending $110 million to reduce the size of the superfund site, as part of a 2005 settlement. Cooperation aims to create 70 additional acres of salt marsh and 11 acres of oyster reef habitat.

Locals have estimated that the only area still affected by contamination is just offshore from the Alcoa plant. Signs warning boaters of the water's toxicity are found at the site. The stigma attached to the bay due to reports of pollution has discouraged fishing, enabling a healthy population to develop.

== Industry ==
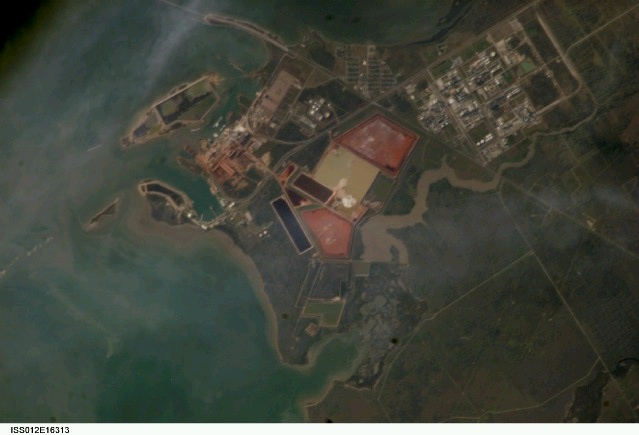
Industry in Point Comfort

Industry is heavy along the bay, with an abundance of natural gas and oil wells at all corners. Natural gas was discovered at the site in 1934, and oil was discovered the next year. Point Comfort is home to several industrial plants along the shore, including Alcoa, Union Carbide, DuPont, and Formosa Plastics Corp. Despite the restrictions on the bay that prevent the production of fish and shellfish along the superfund site, seafood harvesting is a major industry. However, it is not as prominent as it was in the 1920s, when Port Lavaca led the nation in shrimp production, leading to the construction of a quick-freezing plant. Today, shrimping is only allowed south of the Port Lavaca Causeway, due to the north's classification as a nursery location. Shellfish production is allowed in Keller Bay and Lavaca Bay south of Point Comfort, but is restricted along the eastern and northern coast and Chocolate Bay, and is conditionally approved in the remaining locations, including along the shore of Port Lavaca. A small tourism industry also fuels economic growth, spurred by the Port Lavaca State Fishing Pier found alongside the Port Lavaca Causeway. The pier once served as the causeway across the bay but was replaced in the 1960s and converted into a fishing pier of 3,200 feet (980 m), billed as the longest in the world. However this pier is now memorialized by its remains, posts, and small platforms no longer accessible from the shore stand alongside the modern causeway.
