= Caney Creek (Matagorda Bay) =

River in Texas, US

Coordinates: 28.7631°N 95.6452°W

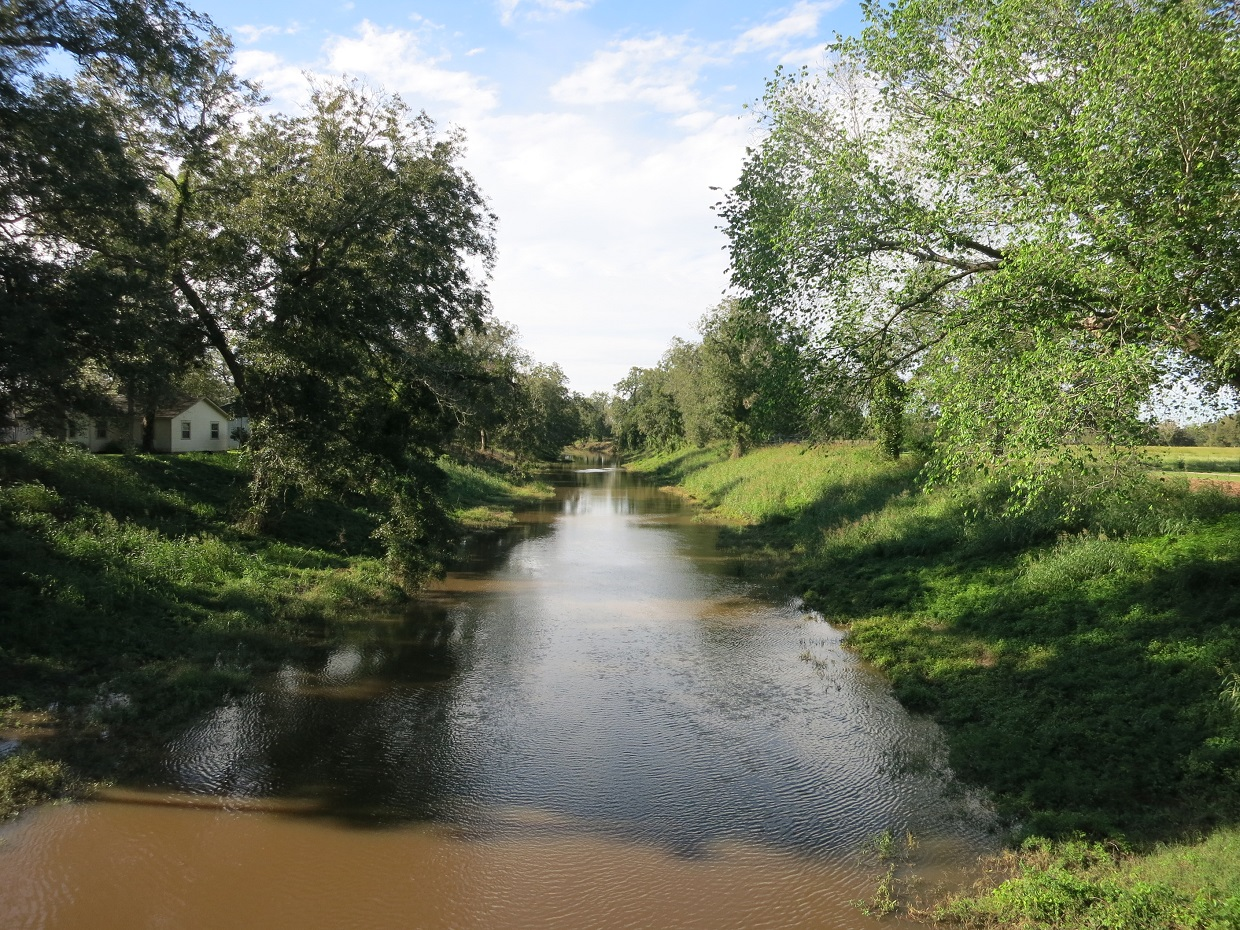
- Caney Creek at the FM 457 bridge near Caney
- Map

Location
- Country: United States

Physical characteristics
- Source
  - location: Matthews, Texas
- Mouth
  - location: Sargent, Texas
- Length: 155 mi (249 km)

Caney Creek (Matagorda Bay) is a river in Texas that begins northwest of Wharton, flows generally southeast, and empties into the Gulf of Mexico near Sargent. The major waterway to the west is the Colorado River and to the east is the San Bernard River.

== Geography ==
Caney Creek rises 1 mile south of Matthews in Colorado County "within the maze of irrigation canals, dead-water sloughs, and old stream channels" at the northern edge of Wharton County. From there, Caney Creek flows 155 miles (249 km) southeast before discharging into the Intracoastal Waterway a distance of 5.5 miles (8.9 km) southeast of Sargent. Thousands of years ago, the Colorado River flowed through the Caney Creek channel before diverting into its present course. In fact, Caney Creek merges with the Colorado River about 1.0 mile (1.6 km) above Glen Flora and leaves the Colorado just below the town. The creek's wide meanders identify it as a very old stream. Caney Creek is intermittent until the Matagorda County line when other streams empty into it, making it a continuously flowing waterway. The land along the stream is farmed for rice and cotton or used for cattle ranching.

After passing through Wharton, Caney Creek runs east and southeast on the south side of FM 1301. The stream runs through Boling-Iago then goes south along FM 1301 to Pledger. From there, Caney Creek flows in a southerly direction on the west side of FM 1728 and passes to the east of Van Vleck. The creek runs south through Allenhurst and passes east of Caney. From there to its mouth, the stream follows FM 457. Caney Creek flows southeast past Cedar Lane where Linnville Bayou joins it just below the FM 521 bridge. The creek turns south and passes through Hawkinsville and Sargent on its way to the Gulf of Mexico. It first intersects the Intracoastal Waterway before emptying into the Gulf and East Matagorda Bay.

Caney Creek Tidal, Caney Creek above Tidal, San Bernard River, Linnville Bayou, Hardeman Slough, and Live Oak Bayou are streams within the Brazos-Colorado Coastal Basin. The Texas Commission on Environmental Quality and the Environmental Institute of Houston (part of University of Houston–Clear Lake) maintain water quality monitoring stations on the Caney Creek and Linnville Bayou watersheds.

== Gallery ==
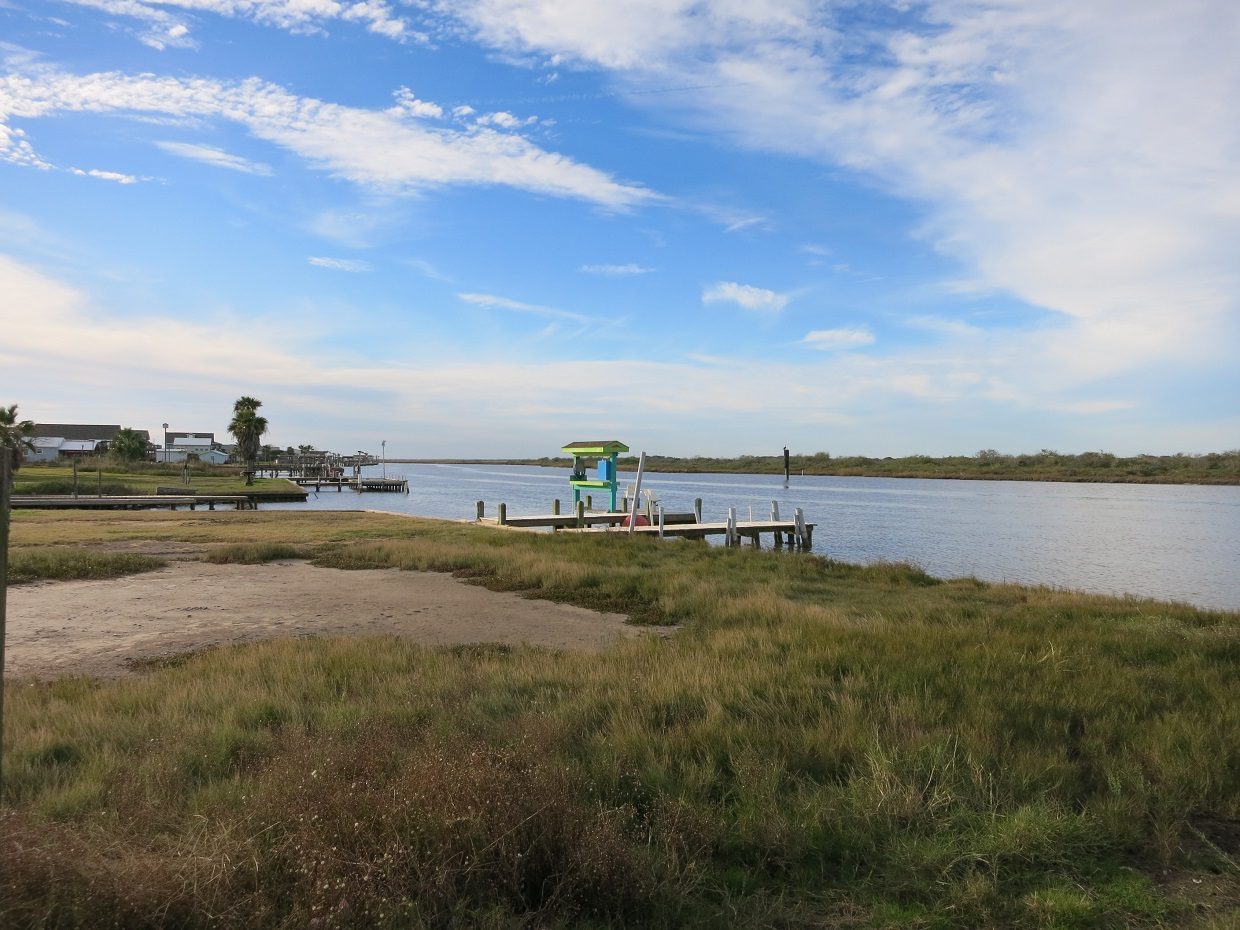
Caney Creek in Sargent, not far above where it empties into the Intracoastal Waterway

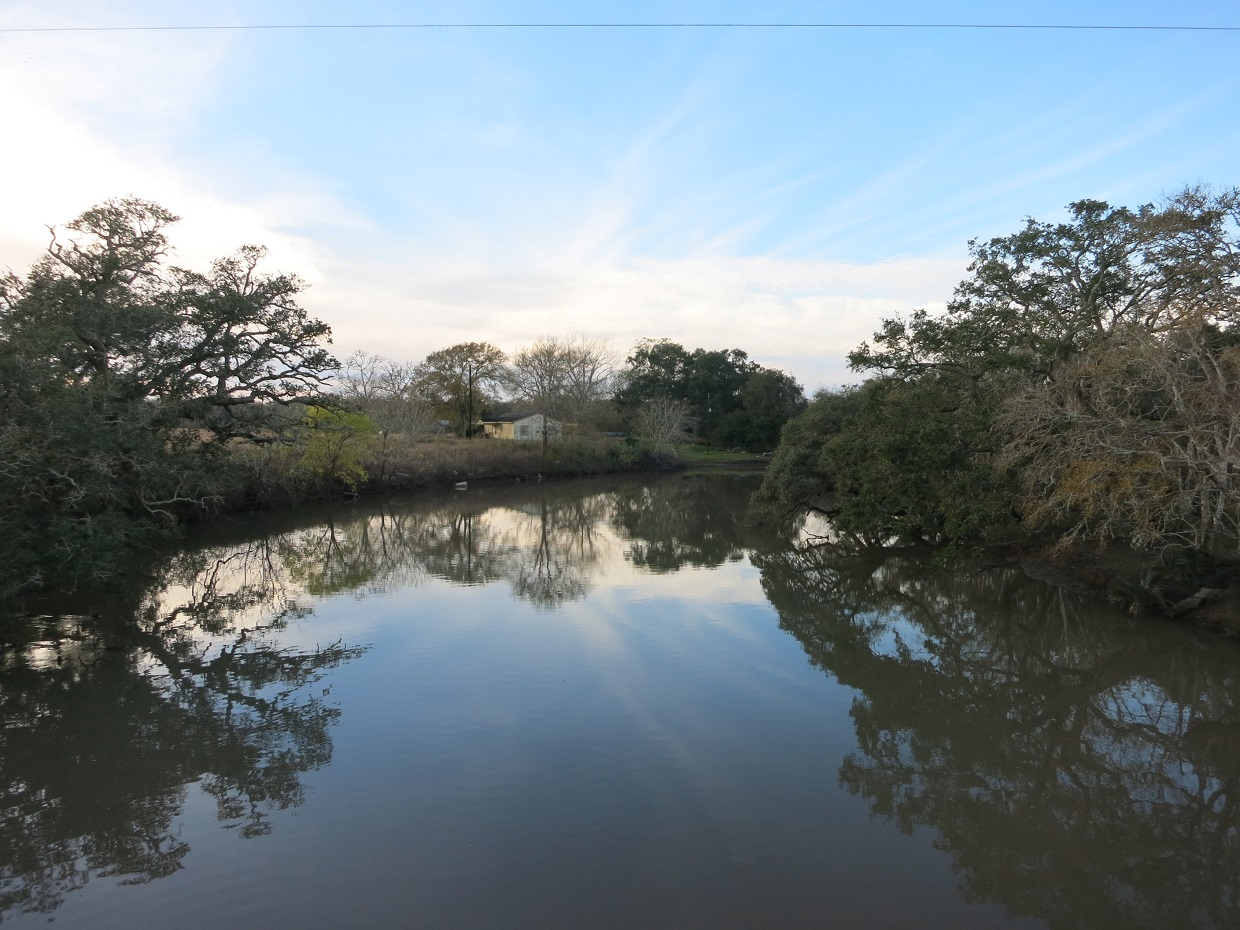
Caney Creek, Sargent Texas

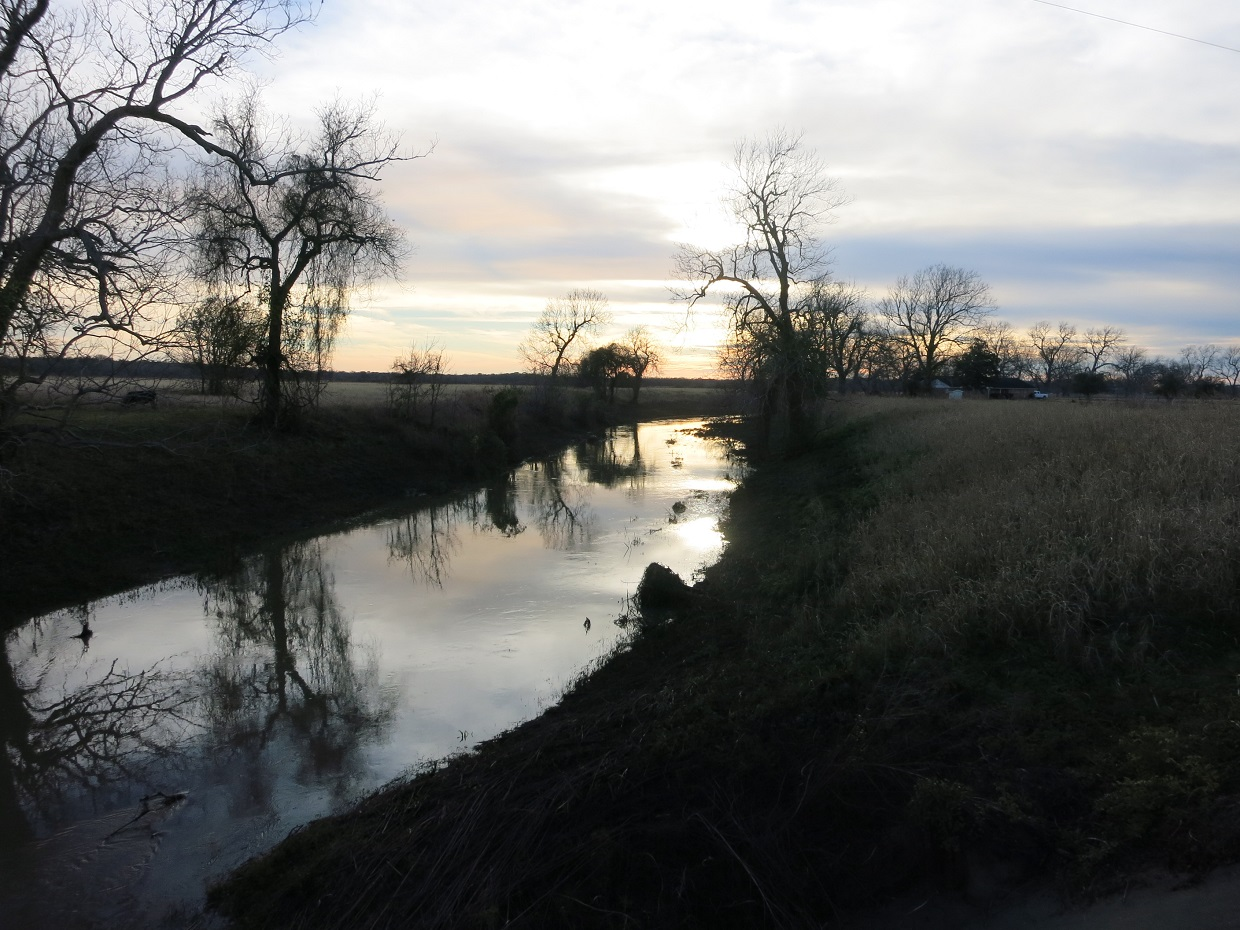
Caney Creek looking upstream at the FM 457 bridge in Cedar Lane

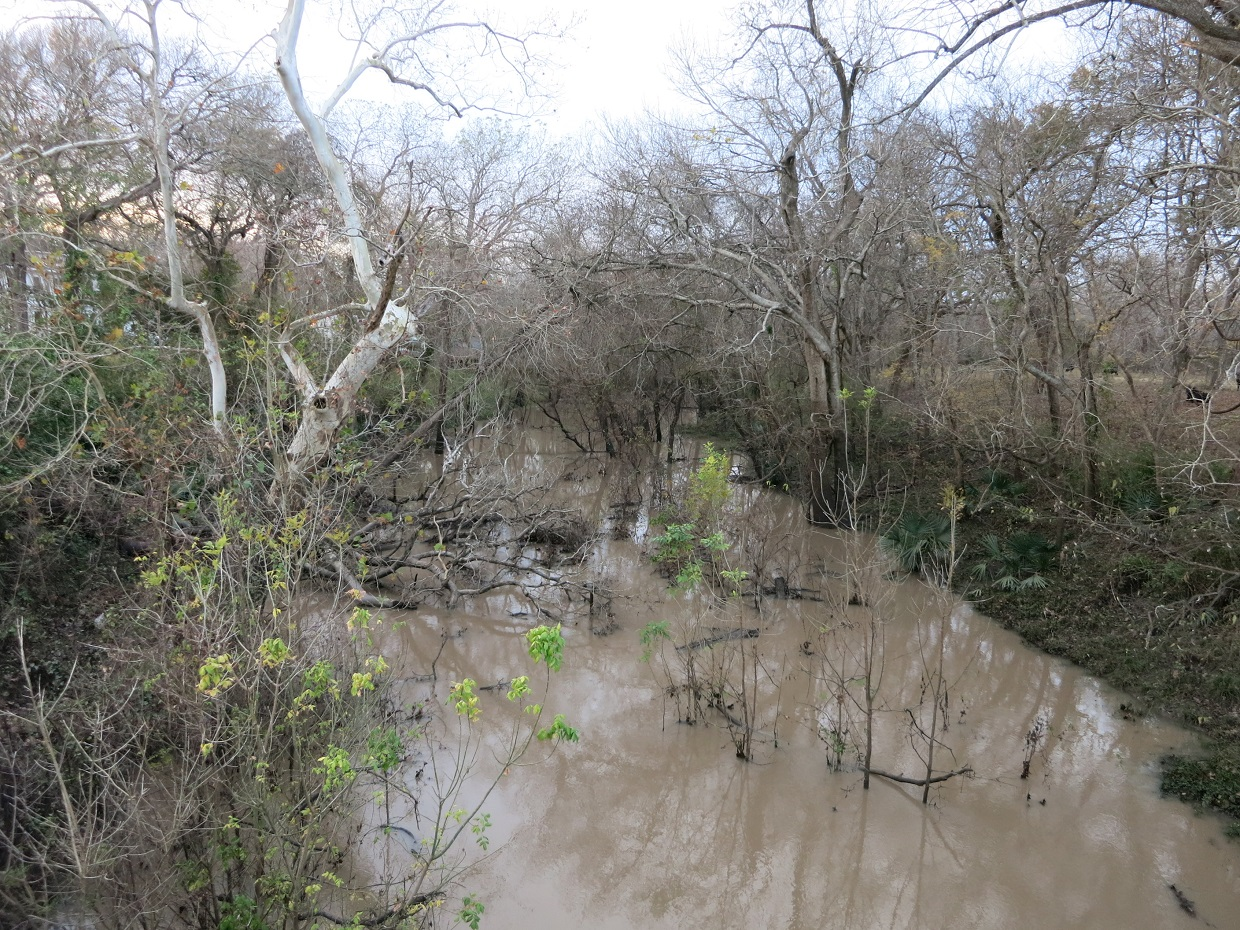
Caney Creek looking upstream at the County Road 112 bridge in Ashwood

== History ==
Caney Creek was first called Canebrake Creek because it had thick cane growth along its banks in the days before Anglo settlers cleared it away. The rich alluvial soil along the creek was noted by surveyor Elias R. Wightman who was one of the Old Three Hundred. His report attracted Anglo-American settlers in the 1820s. Typically, Stephen F. Austin's colonists burned the canebrake to help enrich the soil. Sugar production became so successful that soon large homes were built so that one area was known as Plantation Row. In 1825, Robert Harris Williams was supposed to have built the first cotton gin in Texas along the banks of Caney Creek. During the American Civil War the local Confederate commander John B. Magruder fortified the mouth of Caney Creek, and in January and February 1864 these defenses repelled a Federal naval attack. When no Union soldiers appeared, the 4,000–6,000 Confederate defenders were moved to other locations.

== See also ==
- List of rivers of Texas
- USGS Hydrologic Unit Map - State of Texas (1974)
- "1304 Caney Creek Tidal" (PDF). Houston Galveston Area Council (H-GAC). 2016.
- "Brazos-Colorado Coastal Basin Watersheds: Protecting Recreational Uses". Texas Commission on Environmental Quality (TCEQ). 2018.
