= Ashwood, Texas =

- Unincorporated community
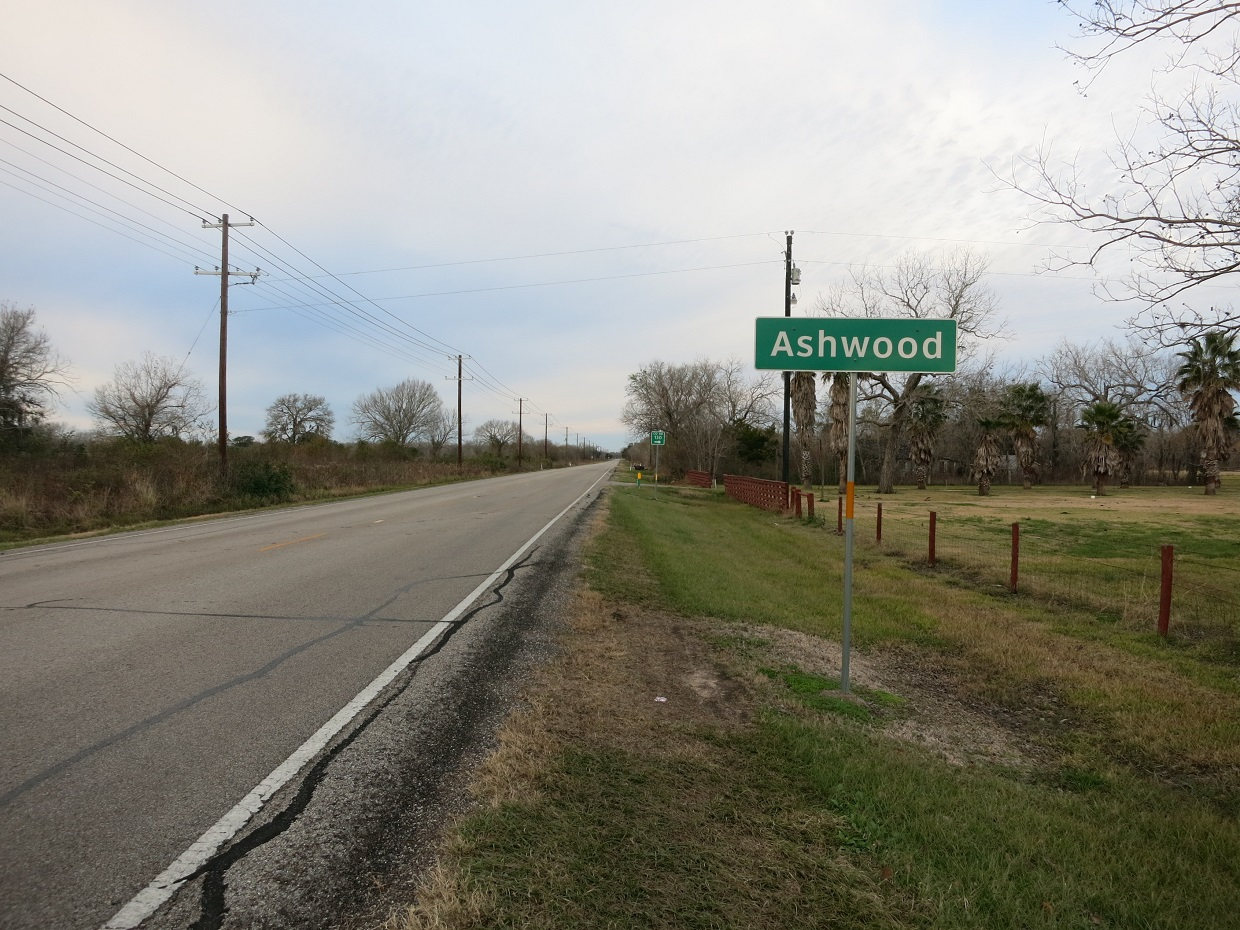
- Ashwood sign on FM 1728

- Location within the state of Texas Ashwood (the United States)
- Coordinates: 29°06′15″N 95°52′17″W
- Country: United States
- State: Texas
- County: Matagorda
- Elevation: 56 ft (17 m)
- Time zone: UTC-6 (Central (CST))
  - Summer (DST): UTC-5 (CDT)
- ZIP code: 77482
- Area code: 979
- GNIS feature ID: 1379368

Ashwood is a small unincorporated community in Matagorda County, Texas, United States. It is located at the intersection of FM 1728 and County Road 112. The community was established when a railroad was built through the area around 1900. It had a post office between 1910 and 1952 when it closed.

== History ==
The New York, Texas and Mexican Railway reached Ashwood about 1899–1900 when a branch was built from Wharton to Van Vleck. In its early days, ash logs were shipped from the settlement. In 1910, a post office opened and Mittie D. Hanson was postmaster. In 1914 there were 87 residents and the community had a general store and a mill. Annie M. Smith became the postmaster in 1916 and continued to hold the position until the post office was closed in 1952. Smith also operated the express office and the J. Fisher Smith Mercantile Store. In 1917 Ashwood had a one-room schoolhouse with four grades. In 1925 the population had grown to 200. By the mid-1930s there were two schools, a church, and one business in the community. In 1938 there was a school for African-American children with two teachers. Ashwood's population dropped to 100 in 1942 and to 20 by 1950. By 1967 there were 30 residents and by 2000 there were about 100.

== Geography ==
Ashwood is along FM 1728 about 13 miles (21 km) north of Bay City in northeastern Matagorda County. Caney Creek flows south on the west side of the community.
