= Schicke Point, Texas =

- Unincorporated community
- Location within Texas Location within the United States
- Coordinates: 28°38′28″N 96°21′21″W
- Country: United States
- State: Texas
- County: Calhoun
- Elevation: 0 ft (0 m)
- Time zone: UTC-6 (Central (CST))
  - Summer (DST): UTC-5 (CDT)
- Area code: 361
- GNIS feature ID: 1377707

Schicke Point is an unincorporated community in Calhoun County, Texas, United States. According to the Handbook of Texas, the community had a population of 70 in 2000. It is part of the Victoria, Texas Metropolitan Statistical Area.

== History ==
Little history of Schicke Point is known, but the community was shown on county highway maps in the 1960s. Its population was 70 as of 2000.

== Geography ==
Schicke Point is located off of County Road 473 on Carancahua Bay and Carancahua Pass in the eastern corner of Calhoun County. It is 9.5 mi (15.3 km) southwest of Palacios.

== Education ==
Schicke Point is served by the Calhoun County Independent School District.
