= Port of Port Lavaca – Point Comfort =

Port of Port Lavaca - Point Comfort
- Click on the map for a fullscreen view

Location
- Country: United States
- Location: Matagorda Bay, Texas
- Coordinates: 28°37′N 96°37′W
- UN/LOCODE: USPLV

Details
- Operated by: Calhoun Port Authority

Statistics
- Website http://www.calhounport.com/

The Port of Port Lavaca – Point Comfort, or simply the Port of Port Lavaca, is a seaport along the shores of Matagorda Bay, Texas (United States). It includes terminals at both Port Lavaca and Point Comfort, Texas. These terminals are connected to the Gulf of Mexico through the Matagorda Ship Channel (a conduit dredged through Matagorda Bay) and by rail via the Point Comfort and Northern Railway which connects to the Union Pacific Railroad.

The Port operates at a depth of 36 feet and a width of 200 feet. In November 2010, the U.S. Army Corps of Engineers authorized the Port to expand to a 44-foot depth and a 400-foot width; there are no current plans to do so.

The Calhoun Port Authority, formerly called the Calhoun County Navigation District, manages the public port. A six-member Port Board—each elected from different districts within Calhoun County oversees the authority. Day-to-day operations and overall port management are handled by a Port Director and a dedicated professional team. The Port Authority functions as a political subdivision of the State of Texas.

Negative coverage was generated when former Representative Blake Farenthold announced on 14 May 2018 that he would be serving as the legislative liaison for the Calhoun Port Authority at a salary of $160,000.10 after resigning his Congressional seat. Farenthold's appointment was questioned since his resignation was provoked by disclosure that he had paid $84,000 to settle sexual harassment allegations from a former aide and because "Revolving Door" laws generally prohibit former representatives from immediately lobbying their recent colleagues.
