= Elias R. Wightman =

Texan colonist and surveyor

- Born: 1792; Herkimer County, New York, U.S.
- Died: October 26, 1841 (aged 48–49); Covington, Kentucky, U.S.
- Known for: Colonist and surveyor
- Spouse: Mary Sherwood
- Parent(s): Benjamin and Esther Wightman

Elias R. Wightman or Elias D. Wightman (early 1792 – October 26, 1841) was one of the Old Three Hundred Texas colonists, having moved there in 1824. He was often employed as a surveyor for Stephen F. Austin's colony.

== Texian settler ==
Wightman was born early in 1792 in Herkimer County, New York to parents Benjamin and Esther (née Randall) Wightman. His father was a Baptist preacher and father to 11 children. Elias taught school in New York and then traveled to Texas in 1824. Stephen F. Austin named him in July 1825 to appraise cargo damaged aboard the schooner Lady of the Lake. In August 1826, Wightman joined others to petition Austin to charter a town at Matagorda. Wightman also petitioned Austin for a league of land and on May 25, 1827 he accepted title to a sitio (or league) in Matagorda County. The sitio was located at the mouth of the Colorado River on the east bank of the river.

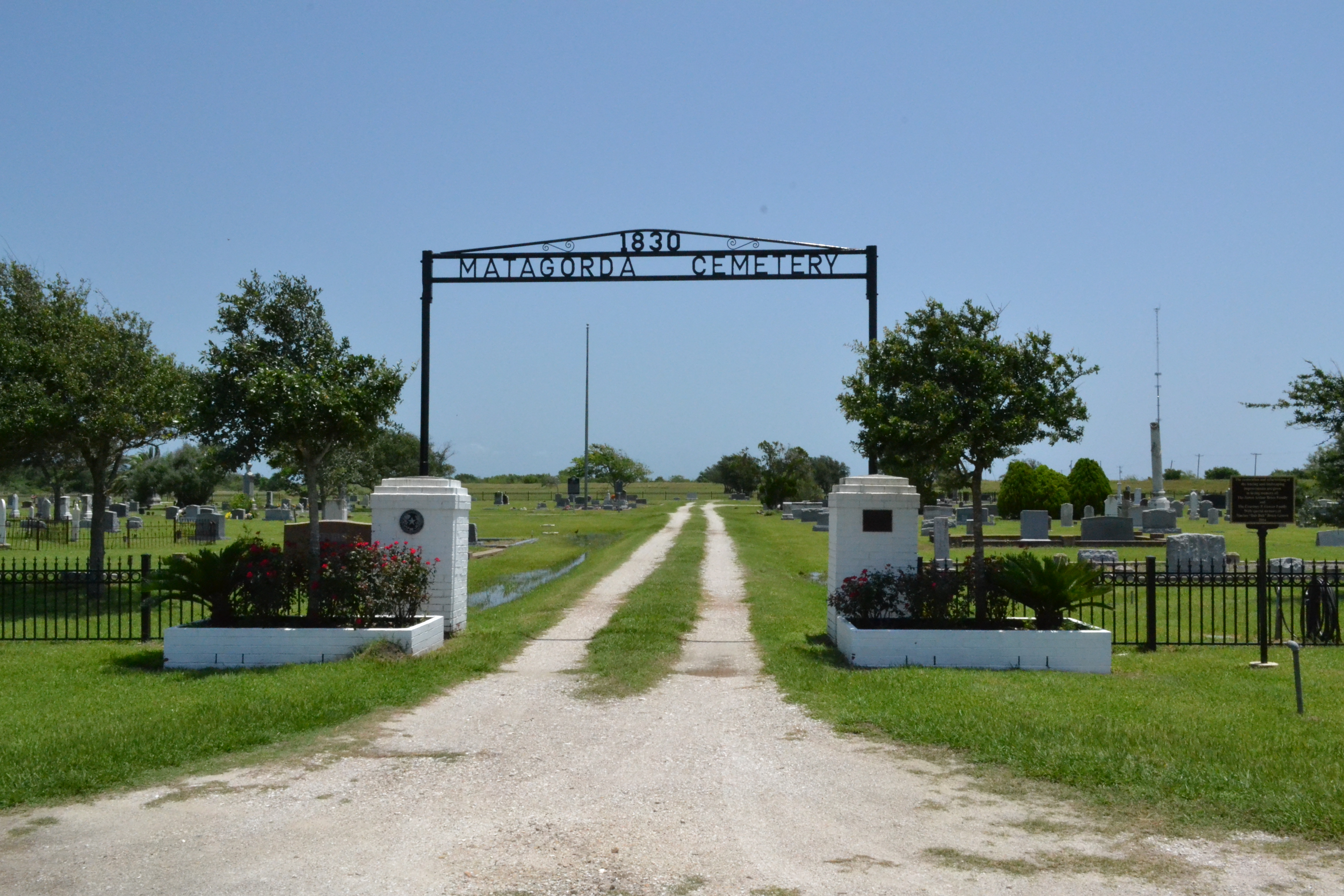
Matagorda Cemetery - 1830

In 1828, Austin sent Wightman and David G. Burnet to the United States to recruit new settlers. While in New York, Wightman married Mary Sherwood, a former student, on October 26, 1828. The couple began their return journey on November 2, 1828 with 50–60 colonists, mostly New Yorkers. They went by wagon to the Allegheny River where they transferred to boat for the trip down the Ohio and Mississippi Rivers. From New Orleans they sailed west on the schooner Little Zoe, beginning on December 26. Bad weather and the tricky passage of the river channel kept them from landing in Matagorda until January 27, 1829. They lived in the small fort for several months until they could get lumber to build a simple cabin. Mary taught school and Sunday school in a log school house from 1829 to 1832. His parents, who made the trip from New York, both died in 1830 and are the earliest burials in the Matagorda Cemetery.

Wightman probably attended an 1829 meeting with Austin at San Felipe to discuss founding a masonic lodge. He was elected surveyor for Matagorda in August 1829. That October, he surveyed the town of Marion. In 1830, he frequently corresponded with frequently Austin while working for him as a surveyor. He promised to teach school for one year and discussed starting a salt works. He and his wife obtained land along Caney Creek which they farmed with several slaves. During the Runaway Scrape in 1836, Mary, her sister, an orphan girl, the family's slaves, and several neighbors fled the Mexican army by sea and were stranded at Galveston. They only returned to Caney Creek with difficulty.

In 1837 Wightman was elected Justice of the Peace in Matagorda County. The next year he joined a company exploring the possibility of clearing Caney Creek for navigation. In 1840 he wrote a letter to Mirabeau B. Lamar suggesting that John Delap succeed Silas Dinsmore as county judge. In 1841, Wightman sold his Texas lands and moved to Covington, Kentucky, looking for a more healthy climate. He died there on October 26, 1841. In the 1980s some of Wightman's surveyor notes were placed in the Matagorda County Museum in Bay City, Texas. His compass, which he shared with William Selkirk, can be seen there as well.
