= Tres Palacios River =

Location
- Country: United States

Physical characteristics
- Source
  - location: El Campo, Texas
  - coordinates: 29°11′17″N 96°16′49″W
- Mouth
  - location: Matagorda Bay
  - coordinates: 28°45′27″N 96°10′21″W

Tres Palacios River is a river in Texas that rises near El Campo, flows in a southerly direction, and empties into Tres Palacios Bay, an arm of Matagorda Bay.

== See also ==
- List of rivers of Texas
