= Matagorda Bay =

Bay on the Texas coast, United States of America

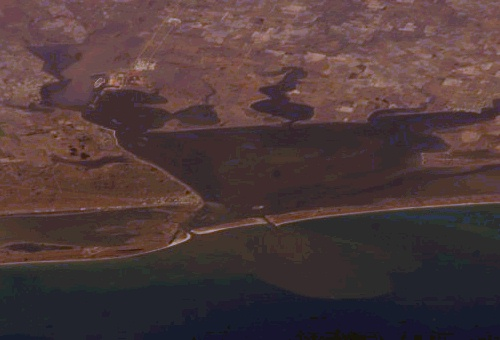

- Location within Texas

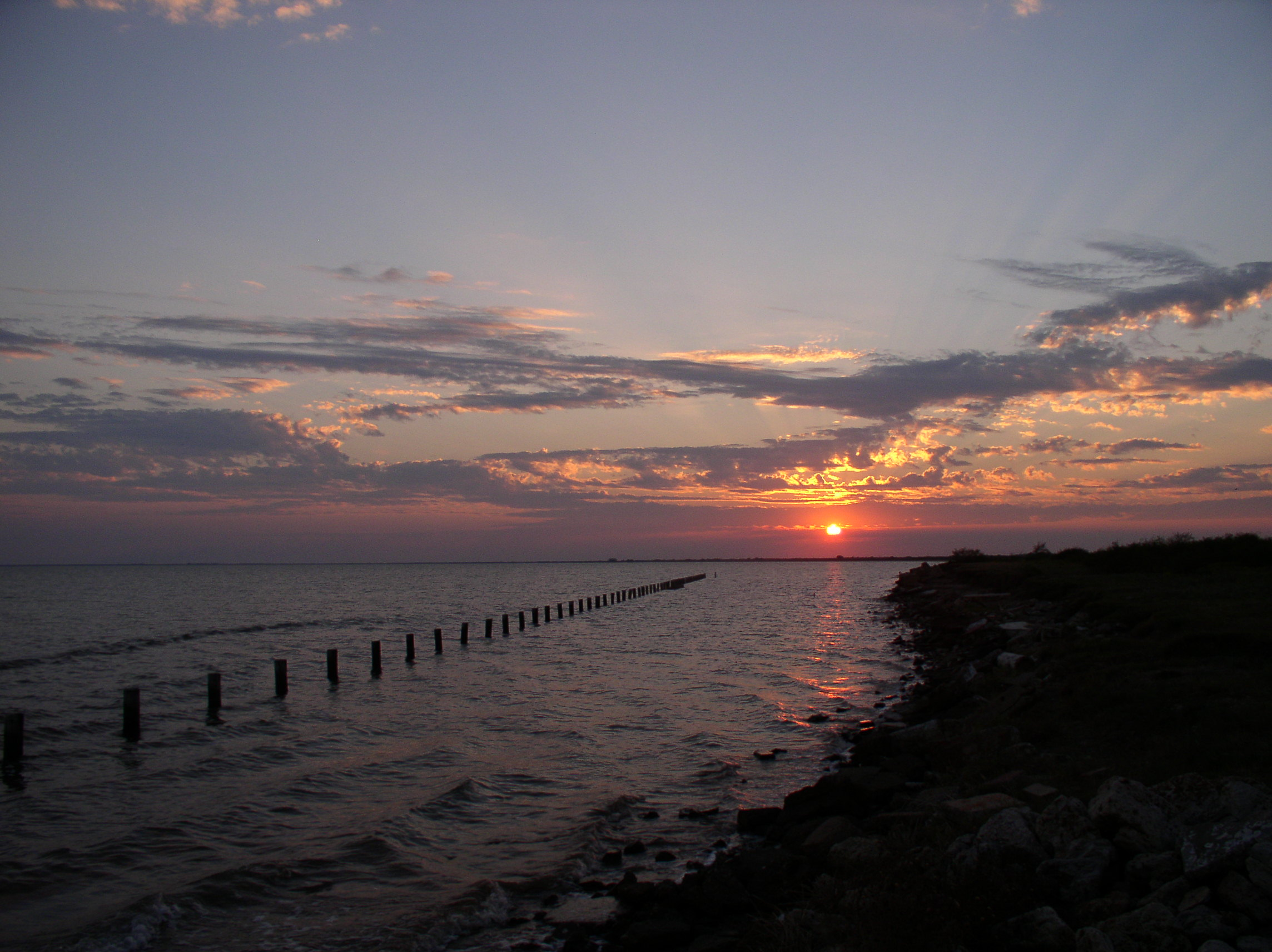
- Matagorda Bay at Jensen Point
- Location: Central Texas Gulf Coast
- Coordinates: 28°33′56″N 96°12′36″W
- River sources: Colorado River (Texas), Lavaca River
- Ocean/sea sources: Gulf of Mexico
- Basin countries: United States
- Surface area: 244,490 acres (98,940 ha)
- Settlements: Port Lavaca, Texas

Matagorda Bay (/ˌmætəˈɡɔːrdə/) is a large Gulf of Mexico bay on the Texas coast, lying in Calhoun and Matagorda counties and located approximately 80 miles (130 km) northeast of Corpus Christi, 143 miles (230 km) east-southeast of San Antonio, 108 miles (174 km) south-southwest of Houston, and 167 miles (269 km) south-southeast of Austin. It is one of seven major estuaries along the Gulf Coast of Texas and serves as the mouth of numerous streams, most notably the Lavaca and Colorado Rivers. The Texas seaport of Port Lavaca is located on the system's northwestern extension of Lavaca Bay. The city of Palacios is found on northeastern extension of Tres Palacios Bay, and Port O'Connor is located on the southwestern tip of the main bay's shore. The ghost town of Indianola, which was a major port before it was destroyed by two hurricanes in the late 19th century, is also found on the bay.

The bay is separated from the Gulf of Mexico by Matagorda Peninsula. Its shore, especially near the Colorado River delta, provides a habitat for a wide variety of wildlife. The wildlife serves as a basis for the birding and fishing tourism, and is an essential component of the production of seafood, specifically shrimp and blue crab, which are the specialties of the area. The fertile land near the bay is ideal for farming, especially for the propagation of rice.

== History ==
Early European records suggest that the bay and the surrounding area went by the names Espíritu Santo and Costa y Bahía de San Bernardo. Spanish explorer Alonso Álvarez de Pineda's map from the late 1510s appears to be the first documentation of the bay. In 1685, French explorer René-Robert Cavelier, Sieur de La Salle established the colony of Fort St. Louis along the bay's shore after missing the entrance to the Mississippi River. Half of the colonists were killed by disease, and the other half, save for five children, were killed by Karankawa Indians. It was afterward referred to as a "lost colony." The Indians kept the children until they were rescued by the Spanish during the Alonso De León and Domingo Terán de los Ríos expeditions near the bay. In 1722 Spanish built a fort, Presidio La Bahia, and Mission Nuestra Señora del Espíritu Santo de Zúñiga on the site of Fort Saint Louis.

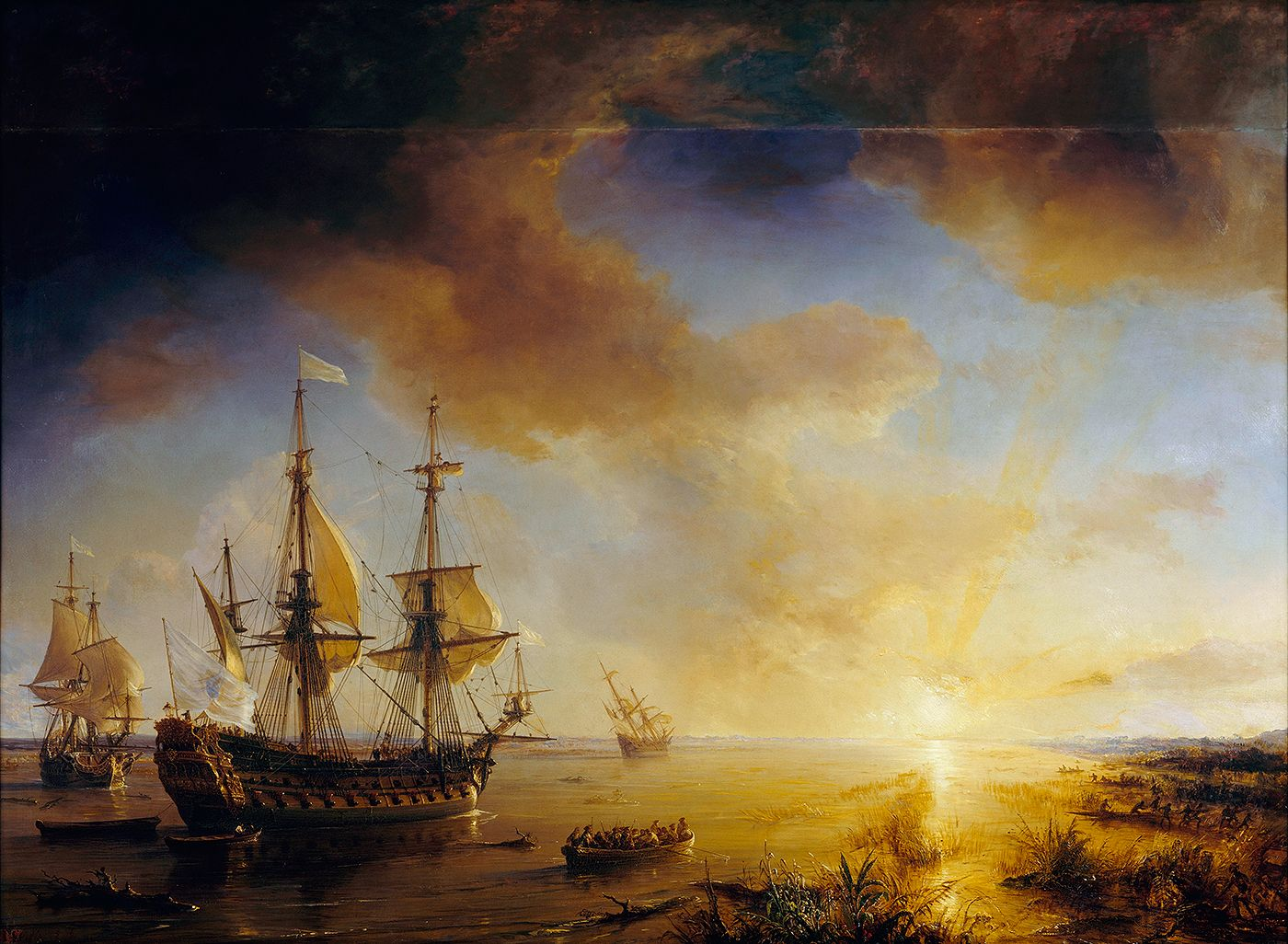
Theodore Gudin's painting of La Salle's entrance into Matagorda Bay, 1684

The port of Linnville was established on Matagorda Bay in 1831, and served as a main port for the Republic of Texas. The Great Comanche Raid of 1840 destroyed the town and forced the inhabitants to flee to the nearby Labbacca, which would later become known as Port Lavaca. Lavaca or la vaca, Spanish for cow, was founded in the wake of the Comanche Raid in 1841. It replaced Linnville as the main port on Matagorda Bay. However, the sandbar-heavy Lavaca Bay caused some navigational problems for ships. As a result, Lavaca was surpassed by Indianola as the main port on Matagorda Bay in the 1850s, even though the sandbars were dredged later in the decade. Indianola had been founded in 1846 as a landing place for German immigrants. It rapidly developed into a major seaport, and became the second largest in the state (after Galveston) by the 1860s.

=== Civil War ===
The two ports, and strategic control of Matagorda Bay in particular, became important during the American Civil War. Control of the bay shifted between the Union and Confederate forces several times. The Union presence in the area ended in June 1864. In the early days of the Civil War, Matagorda Bay was the site of a notable Confederate action. On April 17, 1861, General Earl Van Dorn led the capture of the Star of the West, a Union supply vessel anchored in the bay. Using the steamer General Rusk, Van Dorn and his forces boarded the ship under the cover of night, avoiding bloodshed. The Union captain, recognizing his disadvantage, surrendered. The ship and its cargo were seized for the Confederacy, and President Abraham Lincoln responded by declaring Van Dorn a pirate under U.S. law.

After the war, Indianola continued its growth, and had a population of 5,000 in the 1870s. A hurricane in 1875 caused massive damage to the city. It was rebuilt on a smaller scale shortly thereafter, but a second and more intense hurricane made landfall in 1886 (the fifth most intense in U.S. history), causing even greater destruction. The following year, Indianola was completely abandoned. Although Lavaca was also significantly affected by the hurricanes, it survived as a port, and again became the largest on the bay. It continues to hold this distinction today. It was renamed Port Lavaca in the late 19th century. Palacios was established around 1901, and Port O'Connor was founded on the bay in 1909.

Before 1900, East Matagorda Bay was a free flowing extension, which formed the eastern segment of Matagorda Bay. Flooding and drainage issues caused by the Colorado River, which at the time emptied into the bay, precipitated a massive dredging campaign in the 1920s. Flooding was not remedied by the dredging, as sediment deposited in the bay and formed a tidal marsh that grew at 500 acres (2.0 km^{2}) a year. As a result, local citizens decided to change the course of the Colorado River in 1934 to bypass Matagorda Bay into the Gulf of Mexico, the dredging from this project causing the split and forming the isolated East Matagorda Bay. In 1992, the river was diverted back to the bay.

== Features ==
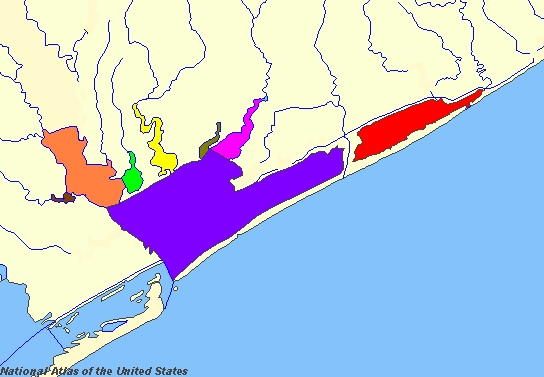
Carancahua Bay (yellow), Chocolate Bay (brown), East Matagorda Bay (red), Keller Bay (lime), Lavaca Bay (orange), Matagorda Bay (purple), Tres Palacios Bay (magenta), Turtle Bay (olive)

The shoreline of the bay is included in the Texas Coastal Plain. At the eastern end, near the Colorado River delta, there is a swampy terrain, with an abundance of wetlands and tidal marshes. Extended coastal prairies supporting native grasses, can be found throughout the area. On average, the Matagorda Bay system is 2 meters (6.6 ft) deep, and covers approximately 1,093 square kilometers (422 sq mi). The main extensions include: Lavaca Bay, which extends westward to the mouth of the Lavaca River; Tres Palacios Bay, which extends northeast to the mouth of the Tres Palacios River and East Matagorda Bay, which is nearly isolated from the system by the Colorado River delta. Other inlets include Turtle Bay, Carancahua Bay, Keller Bay, and Cox Bay.

Together with its extensions, Matagorda Bay forms one of seven major estuaries along the Gulf Coast of Texas, and the third largest estuarine system in Texas behind Galveston Bay and Laguna Madre. It receives the discharge from the Colorado River and the Lavaca River, as well as numerous smaller creeks. Every second, approximately 150 cubic meters (40,000 U.S. gal) of water flows into the bay. Water exchange with the Gulf of Mexico occurs at Pass Cavallo, Matagorda Ship Channel, Greens Bayou, the Colorado River Delta Complex and Brown Cedar Cut. As a result of the seawater exchange, the bay's salinity is 19 parts per thousand (ppt), which is lower than the seawater average of 35 ppt.

== Ecosystem ==
A wide variety of wildlife can be found in and around Matagorda Bay. The Mad Island-Oyster Lake conservation area, located on the eastern shore of Matagorda Bay, is a habitat for over 300 species of birds including songbirds, shorebirds and waterfowl. More species of birds were found in the area than any other in the nation during the National Audubon Society's annual Christmas Bird Count from 2000 to 2002. Other fauna located along the bay include bobcats, white-tailed deer, river otters, Texas horned lizards, reddish egret, white-tailed hawk, peregrine falcon, the piping plover and alligators.

According to Texas Parks and Wildlife, the following fish have been caught in the bay: striped bass, gafftopsail catfish, Atlantic croaker, black drum, red drum, southern flounder, barred grunt, hake, skipjack herring, crevalle jack, ladyfish, Gulf menhaden, pigfish, smooth puffer, sand seatrout, spotted seatrout, blacktip shark, gray snapper, southern stingray, Gulf toadfish and tripletail. The bay serves as a nursery for finfish, shrimp and crabs.

== Industry ==
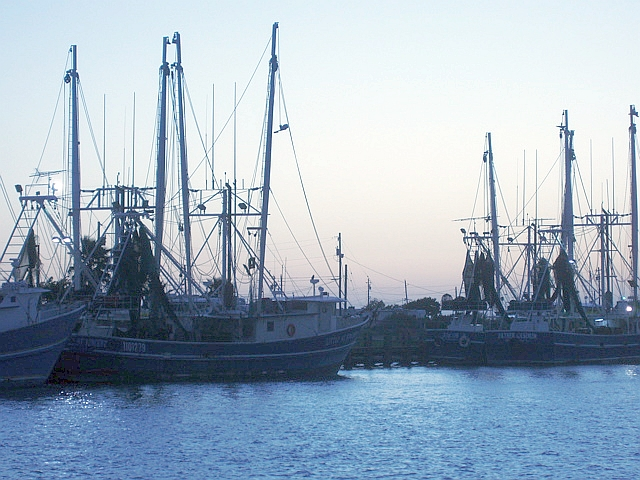
Shrimping boats in Palacios

The Matagorda Bay system is a renowned fishing location in the region, due to its status as a nutrient-rich estuary. The mainstays of the settlements on the bay include seafood processing, manufacturing, agriculture and tourism. Commercial fishermen specialize in oyster, blue crab, and shrimp. Port Lavaca is the national leader in the processing of shrimp, and passed four million tons of seafood through its port in 1985 alone. Palacios houses the largest blue crab processing plant in the United States, and is home to the only individually quick frozen shrimp plant in Texas. Recreational fishing also contributes to the local economies via tourism. Tourists often flock to the Port Lavaca State Fishing Pier, which is a major point of interest for fishermen. Other activities for visitors include hunting, oyster roasts, beach combing and birding.

Several manufacturing complexes have been erected along the bay, which employ local residents. The Aluminum Company of America, Union Carbide, Du Pont, and Formosa Plastics all established plants in Point Comfort. The South Texas Nuclear Generating Station is found in nearby Bay City. Petroleum and natural gas were discovered in the bay in the 1930s. Maize, cotton, soybeans, turf, and rice grow well around the bay, especially in the fertile delta region.
