= Matagorda Peninsula =

Barrier peninsula in Texas

Coordinates: 28°35′06″N 96°01′06″W

The Matagorda Peninsula (/ˈmætəˈɡɔːrdə/) is a narrow spit of land on the southeastern coast of Texas in the United States.

The peninsula is in Matagorda County, Texas. The barrier island lies between Matagorda Bay, an estuary, and the Gulf of Mexico. The Texas Gulf Coast island has a water exchange of two to five tidal inlets suspending the tides in marginal sea. The Matagorda Ship Channel located on the peninsula produces a substantial tidal range of seawater bearing north-south of the barrier island.
