= Tres Palacios Bay =

Coordinates: 28.706699°N 96.196289°W

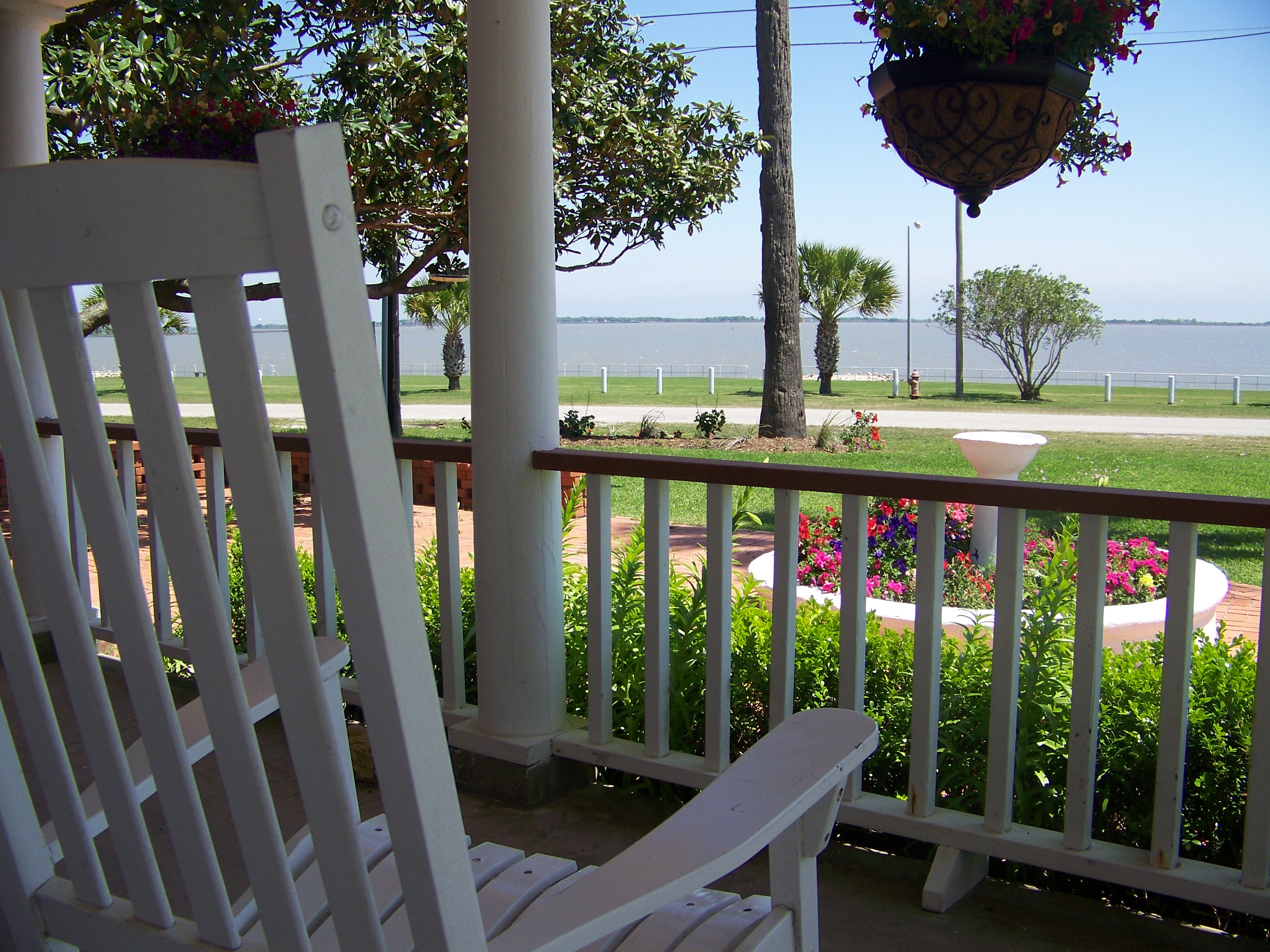
Tres Palacios Bay as viewed from a porch in Palacios.

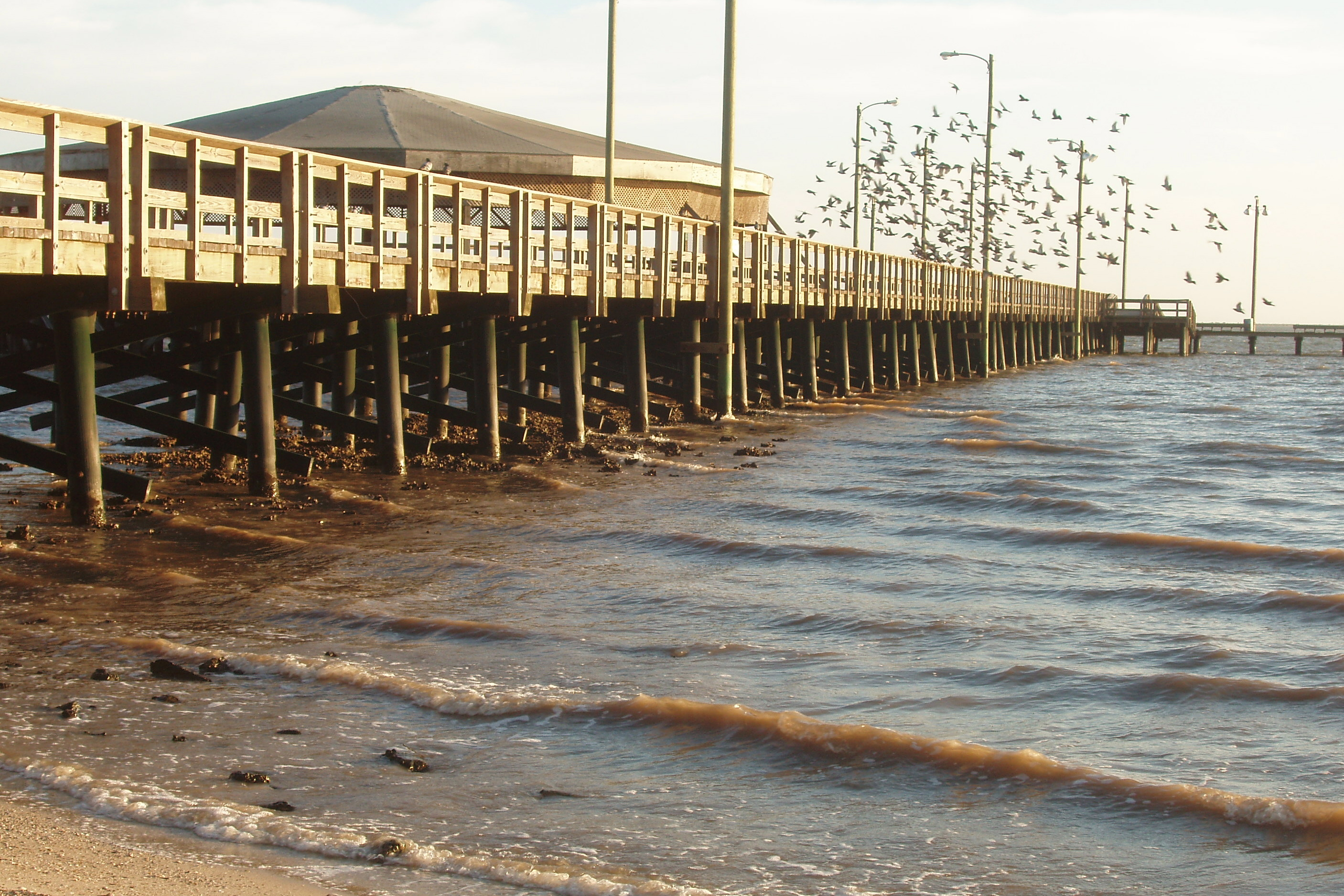
A pier on Tres Palacios Bay.

Tres Palacios Bay is a northeastern extension of Matagorda Bay on the Texas coast in Matagorda County. It is fed by the Tres Palacios River. The city of Palacios is located on its shores. A channel that connects Palacios to the Intracoastal Waterway has been dredged through the bay.

== History ==
Two conflicting stories explain the name of the bay Tres Palacios, which is Spanish for "Three Palaces". One account describes the aftermath of a Spanish shipwreck on Matagorda Bay. As the survivors approached present-day Palacios, they saw three palaces on the shore. However, when they reached land, the palaces mysteriously disappeared. Another account explains that the bay was named for José Félix Trespalacios, who briefly served as Governor of Texas in the 1820s.

Before Palacios was founded in the early 20th century, several settlements were established on the bay. Tres Palacios was founded in the 1830s, and was widely known as Tidehaven due to its location on the outer tidal reaches of the bay. A blacksmith shop, two hotels, and a market were constructed in the town by the 1850s, and a post office was established in 1856. Palacios Point was founded in 1838 at the confluence of the Matagorda and Tres Palacios Bays. Along with houses, a few wharves and warehouses were constructed before the American Civil War. However, most of these buildings were torn down or abandoned in the 1880s due to storms and legal conflicts. Portsmouth was established in the same area following the arrival of the railroad in 1902, but it never developed into a substantial settlement.

Shortly after the founding of Palacios, Collegeport was established on the opposite end of the bay. The town's name derived from the Gulf Coast University of Industrial Arts, which had been erected in the area by the Hurd Land Company. The town prospered in cattle, until the late 1910s, when a farming shortage, followed by an ice storm caused many residents to leave. The university was closed in 1952. Collegeport still exists, and had a population of 85 people during the 2000 U.S. census.

== Ecosystem ==
The bay is a popular fishing destination, specializing in shrimp and blue crab production. It is also recognized as an ideal birding locale; over 300 species of birds have been spotted near the bay, and it led the nation during the National Audubon Society's Annual Christmas bird count from 2000 to 2002.
