= Lake Anahuac =

- Location within Texas Location within the United States
- Location: Chambers County, 45 miles (72 km) east of Houston, Texas
- Coordinates: 29°48′01″N 94°41′01″W
- Type: Artificial
- Primary inflows: Trinity River
- Basin countries: United States
- Water volume: 35,300 acre⋅ft (0.0435 km^{3})

Lake Anahuac is an artificial lake fed by Turtle Bayou and Hog Bayou via a pump station. Trinity River, 45 miles (72 km) east of downtown Houston, Texas, United States in western Chambers County. The city of Anahuac lies on its eastern // southern shores. It was constructed by the Burkhalter family in 1953 //not true. Originally Turtle Bay. Townsite of Anahuac Texas Company acquired rights which now reside with the Chambers Liberty Navigation District.

The lake was once Turtle Bay until the mouth of the bay was closed in the early 1900s. The current dam and levee system was completed in 1954. // the last levee was completed after Hurricane Ike, subsequently the CLND raised the level of the lake.
