= East Texas =

Geographic and cultural region of the U.S. state of Texas

Coordinates: 31°52′N 94°55′W

- Region
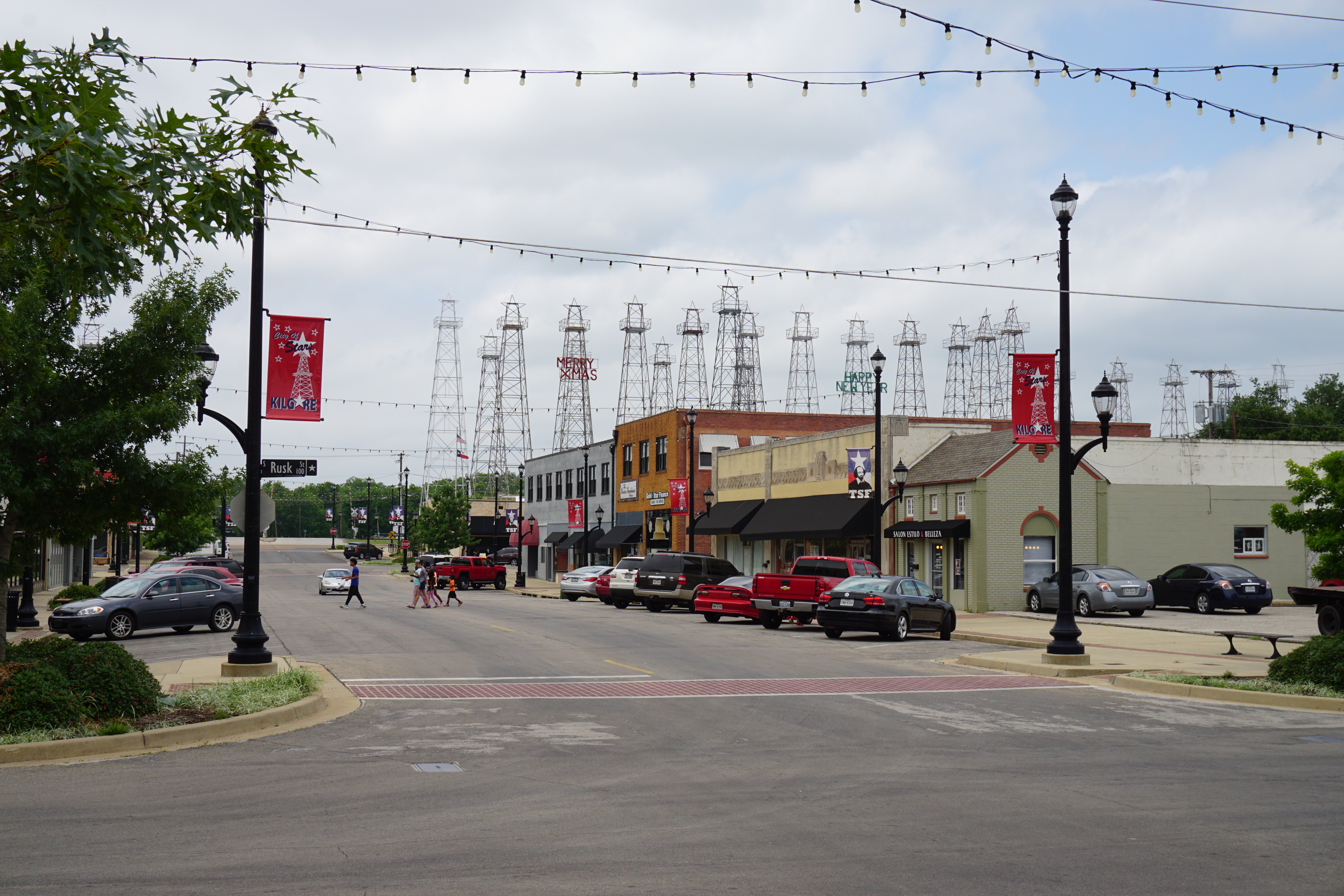
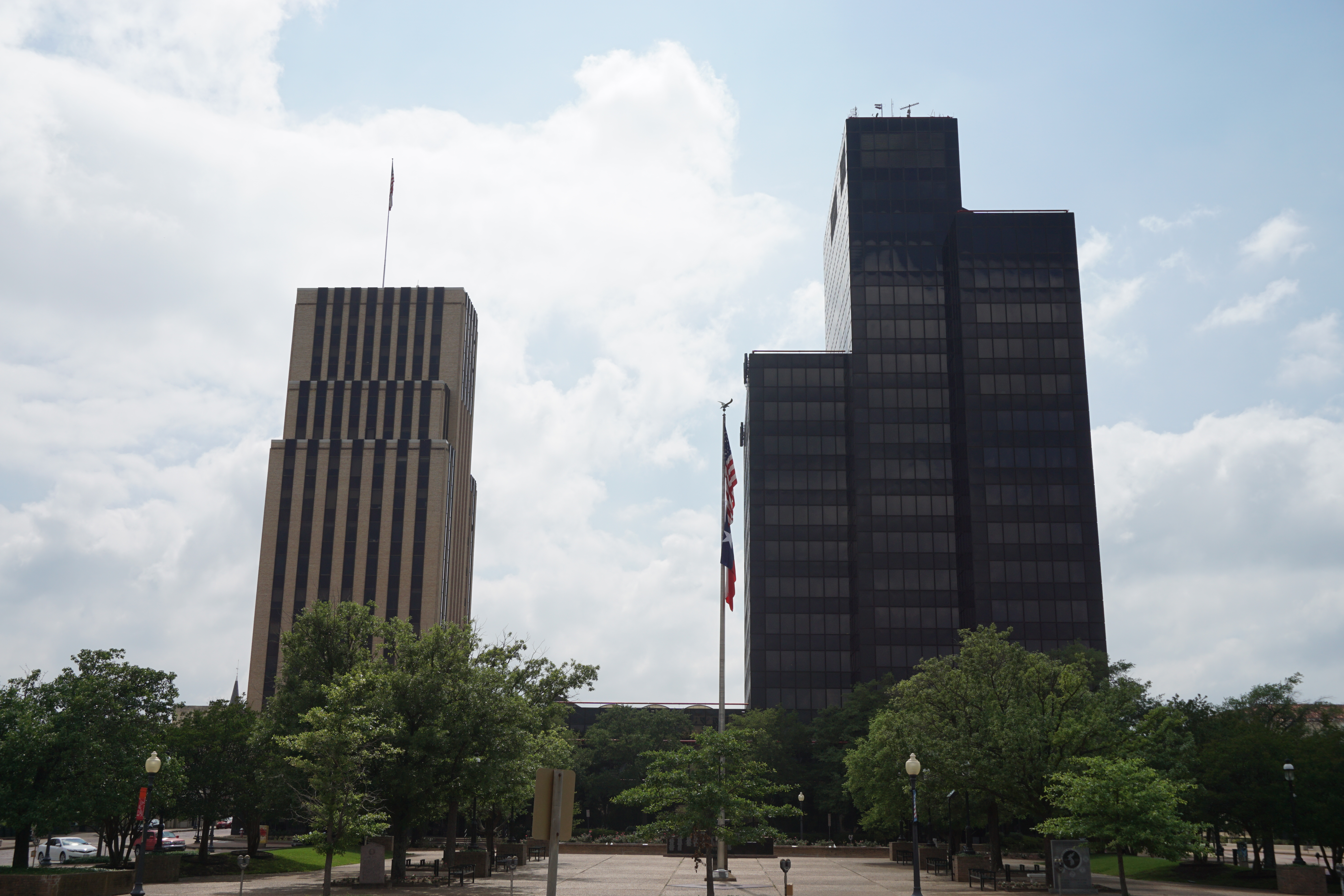
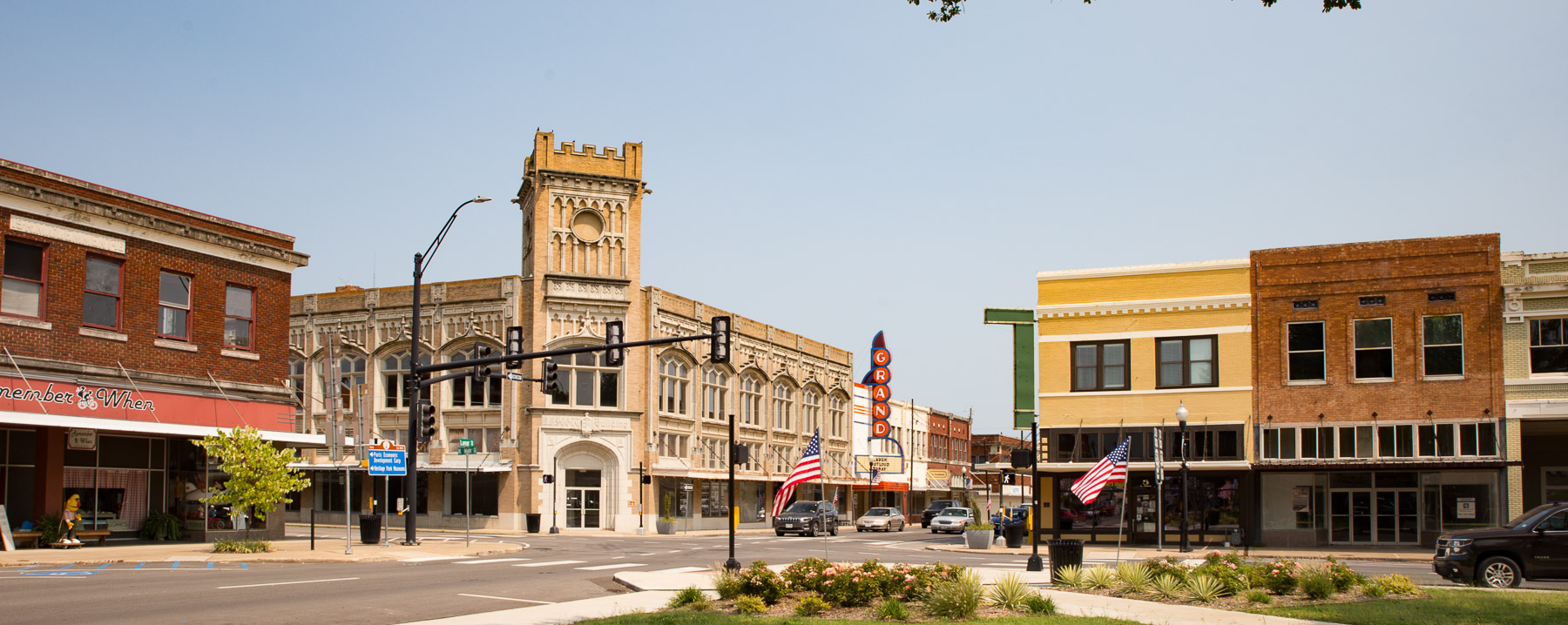
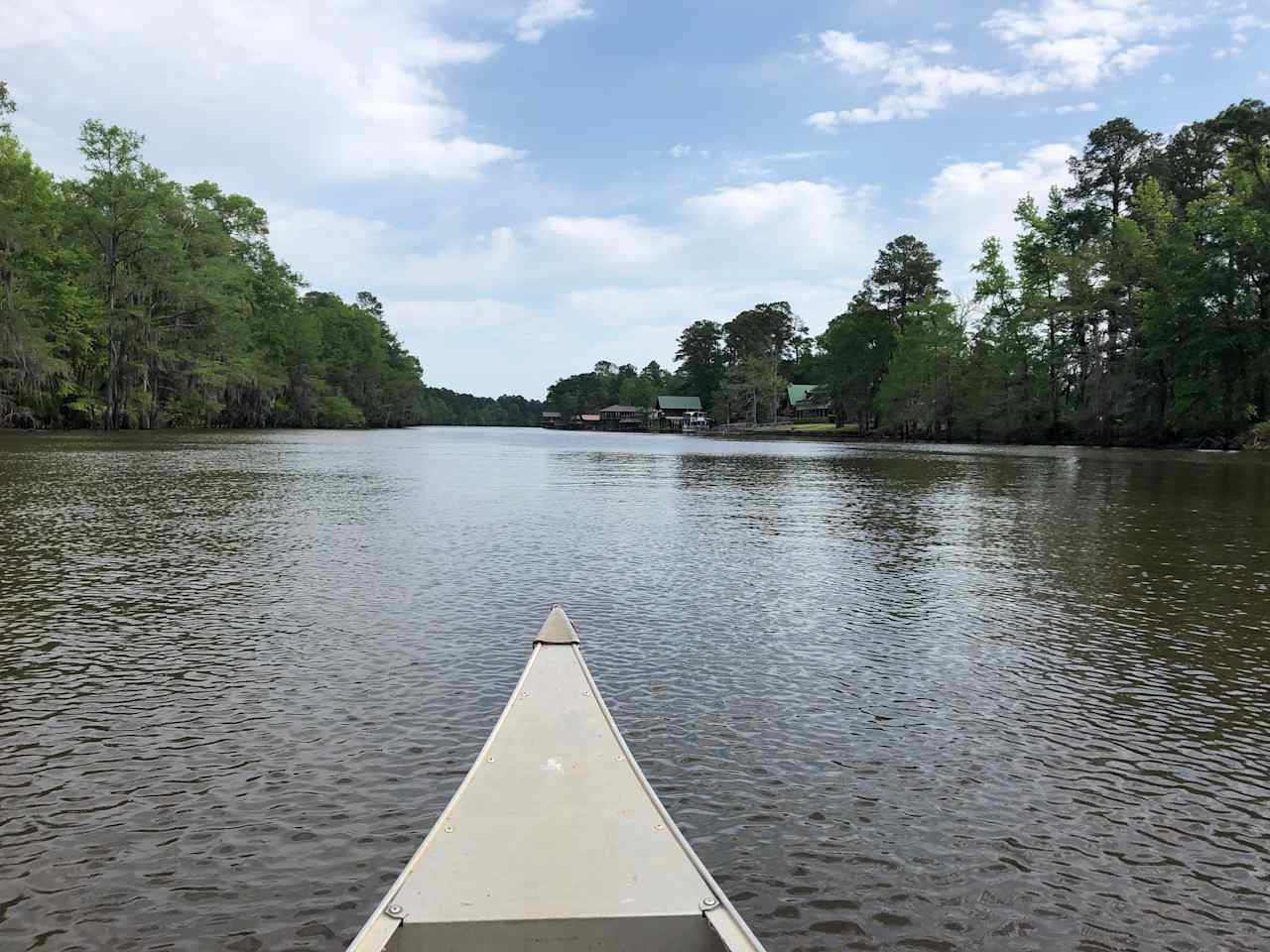
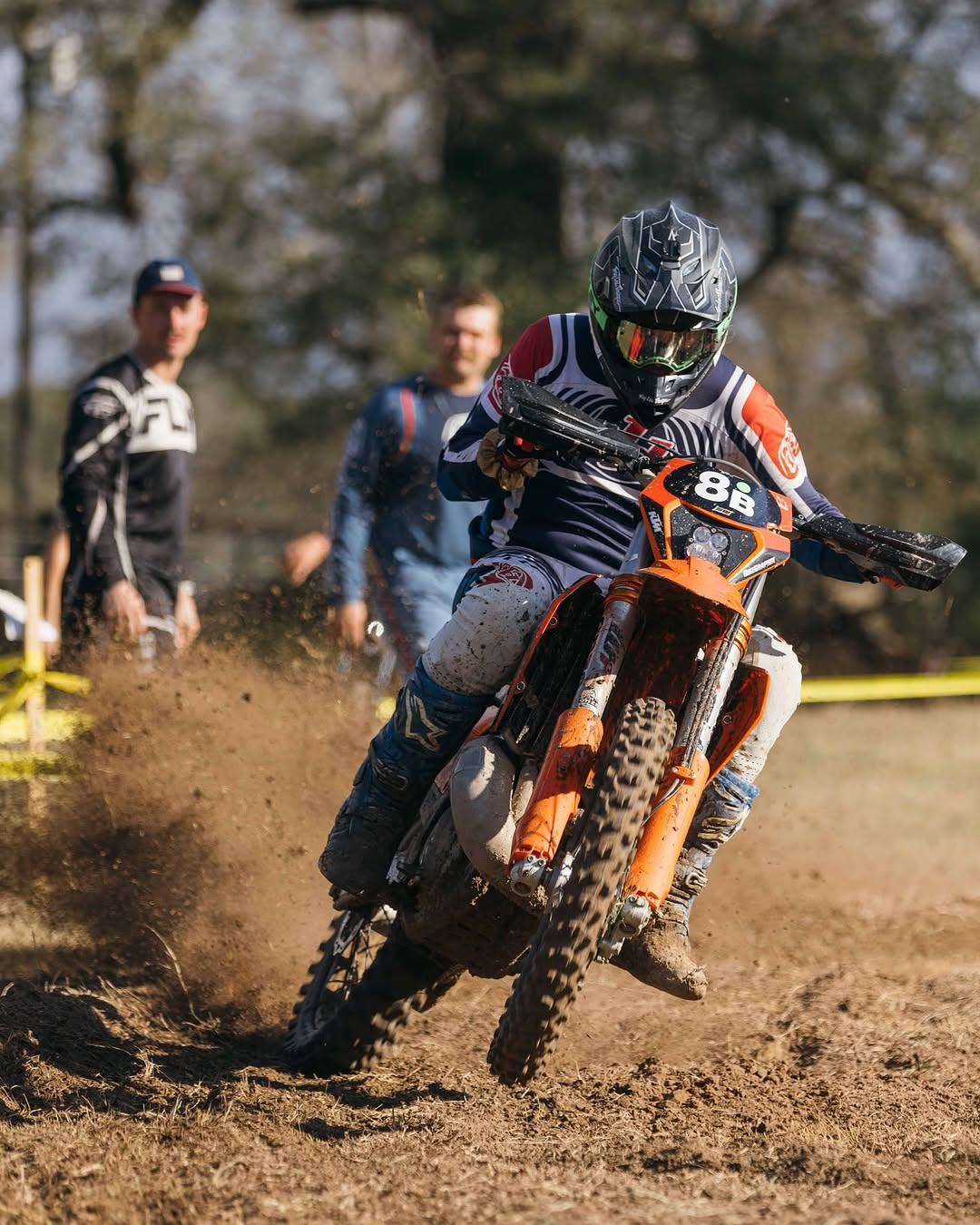
- From top to bottom, left to right: Downtown Kilgore, Downtown Tyler; Paris; Kayaking in Caddo Lake; Dirt biking in the Piney Woods; Commercial Historic District and Downtown Beaumont
- Nickname: "ETX"
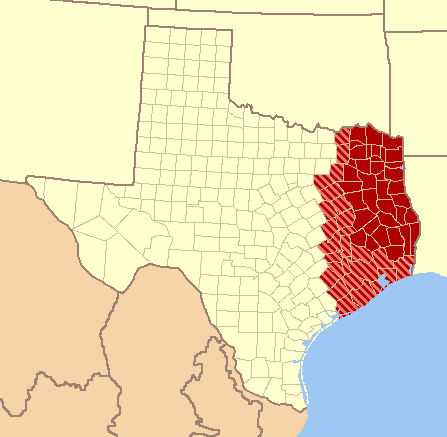
- East Texas counties in red; the inclusion of pink and red counties varies from source to source, thus may or may not be included in East Texas
- Country: United States
- State: Texas
- Counties: Anderson; Angelina; Bowie; Camp; Cass; Cherokee; Delta; Franklin; Gregg; Grimes; Hardin; Harrison; Henderson; Hopkins; Houston; Hunt; Jasper; Jefferson; Lamar; Marion; Morris; Nacogdoches; Newton; Orange; Panola; Polk; Rains; Red River; Rusk; Sabine; San Augustine; San Jacinto; Shelby; Smith; Titus; Trinity; Tyler; Upshur; Van Zandt; Wood
- Largest city: Tyler

Population (2020)
  - Total: 1,918,628

East Texas is a broadly defined cultural, geographic, and ecological region in the eastern part of the U.S. state of Texas that consists of approximately 38 counties. It is roughly divided into Northeast, Southeast, and Deep East Texas. Most of the region consists of the Piney Woods ecoregion. East Texas can sometimes be defined only as the Piney Woods. At the fringes, towards Central Texas, the forests expand outward toward sparser trees and eventually into open plains.

According to the Handbook of Texas, the East Texas area "may be separated from the rest of Texas roughly by a line extending from the Red River in north-central Lamar County southwestward to east-central Limestone County and then southeastward towards eastern Galveston Bay." Most sources separate the Gulf Coast area into a separate region.

The East Texas region includes Tyler, Kilgore, Longview, Texarkana, Lufkin, Marshall, Palestine, Henderson, Jacksonville, Mount Pleasant, and Nacogdoches as principal cities in addition to, in its expanded definition, Greenville, and the metropolitan statistical areas of Houston and Beaumont.

== Geography ==
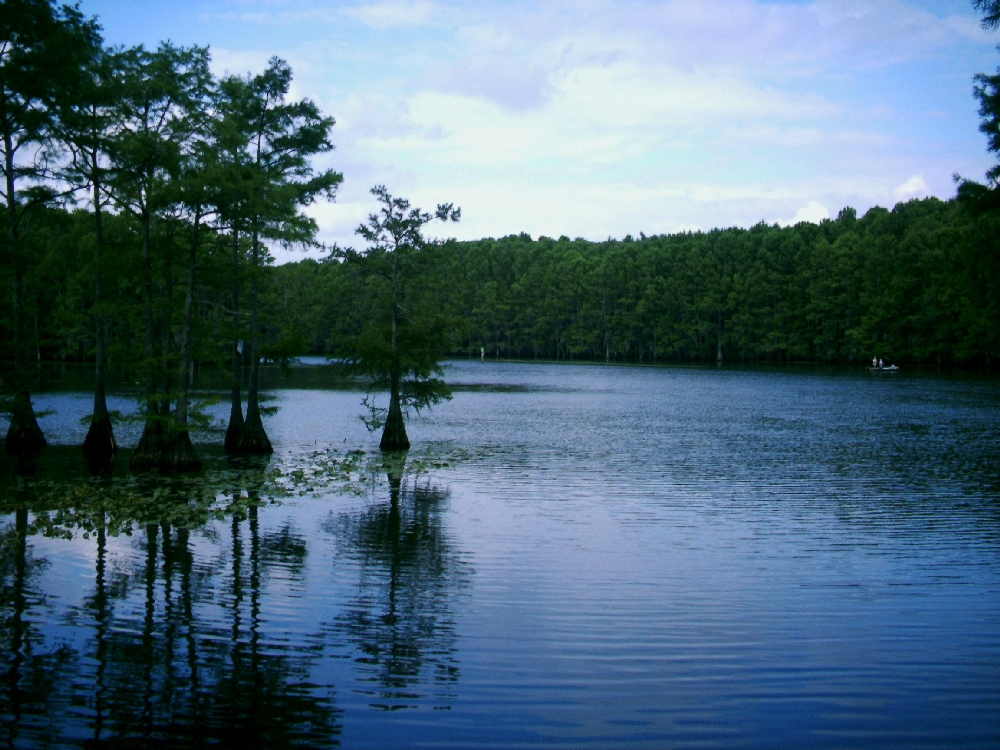
Caddo Lake

Climate is the unifying factor in the region's geography; all of East Texas has the humid subtropical climate typical of the Southeast, occasionally interrupted by intrusions of cold air from the north. East Texas receives more rainfall, 35 to 60 inches (890 to 1,520 mm), than the rest of Texas. In Houston, the average January temperature is 50.4 °F (10.2 °C) and the average July temperature is 82.6 °F (28.1 °C). However, Houston has slightly warmer winters than most of East Texas due to its lower latitude and proximity to the coast.

All of East Texas lies within the Gulf Coastal Plain. It has less uniformity of climate than the rolling hills in the north and flat coastal plains in the south. Local vegetation varies from north to south, with the lower third consisting of the temperate grassland extending from South Texas to South Louisiana and the northern two-thirds of the region dominated by the temperate forest known as the Piney Woods. These extend more than 23,500 square miles (61,000 km^{2}). The Piney Woods are part of a much larger region of pine-hardwood forest that extends into Louisiana, Arkansas, and Oklahoma. The Piney Woods area thins out as it nears the Gulf of Mexico. West of the Piney Woods are the ranchlands and remnant oak forests of the East Central Texas forests ecoregion.

The Sabine, Trinity, Neches, Angelina and Sulphur rivers are the major rivers in East Texas, but the Brazos and Red rivers also flow through the region. The Brazos cuts through the southwest portion of the region, while the Red River forms its northern border with Oklahoma and a portion of Arkansas. In East Texas and the rest of the South, small rivers and creeks collect into swamps called bayous and merge with the surrounding forest. Bald cypress and Spanish moss are the dominant plants in bayous. The most famous of these bayous are Cypress Bayou and Buffalo Bayou. Cypress Bayou surrounds the Big, Little, and Black Cypress rivers around Jefferson. They flow east into Caddo Lake, and the adjoining wetlands cover the rim and islands of the lake.

=== Deep East Texas ===
Deep East Texas is a subregion of East Texas, alongside Northeast and Southeast Texas. According to the Deep East Texas Council of Governments, the region consists of the following twelve counties: Angelina, Houston, Jasper, Nacogdoches, Newton, Polk, Sabine, San Augustine, San Jacinto, Shelby, Trinity, and Tyler.

The "Deep" designation comes from the similarity to East Texas (it is similar in culture and topography, being highly forested), but with a location "deeper" (i.e., farther south and towards the Gulf Coast) than the rest of East Texas.

"Deep" also refers to the cultural and social characteristics of the area. This is considered synonymous to the "Big Thicket", an allusion to the dense growth of underbrush in the Piney Woods. It was the earliest area of Texas to be settled by Anglo-Americans from the United States (and one of the last areas to submit to law enforcement—by the governments of New Spain, Mexico, the Republic of Texas, the state of Texas, or the United States). Well into the first quarter of the 20th century, renegade clans controlled local governments, especially in Shelby County.

The area contains two of the oldest towns in Texas; Nacogdoches, the oldest town in Texas, dating from the 18th century, and San Augustine, the oldest "British-American" settlement in Texas, dating from the 1820s. People of English, Scottish, Scots-Irish, and to a lesser extent Welsh ancestry predominate in this region, because of the history of settlement. This is in contrast to West Texas and South Central Texas, where people of Hispanic and German ancestry predominate, respectively. Hispanic settlers are descended from colonists of New Spain, dating from the 16th and 17th centuries. Most of the German immigrant ancestors in Central Texas arrived after the Revolutions of 1848.

The Spanish and later Mexican governments did not want settlers from the United States until after Mexico had gained independence. East Texas had been barely settled by Spanish and Mexican colonists, and the government decided to allow immigration from the US to bolster defenses against raiding by the Apache and Comanche. Neither government was able to exert much control or law enforcement in the area. As a consequence, the "Big Thicket" became a refuge for criminals fleeing the United States and hiding out in a "no man's land" in the pine tree thickets.

=== The Pine Curtain ===
The early isolation of the region and its links to the Deep South have resulted in the piney woods being described as a 'curtain' that demarcates a certain cultural enclave or bubble that distinguishes East Texas from the rest of the state. Former residents describe living behind the 'Pine Curtain' as a form of escape. The phrase is often used to describe the area; it appeared in a newspaper column in the Palestine Herald-Press, and in a late 20th-century tourist guide by Mike Dougan.

== Demography ==
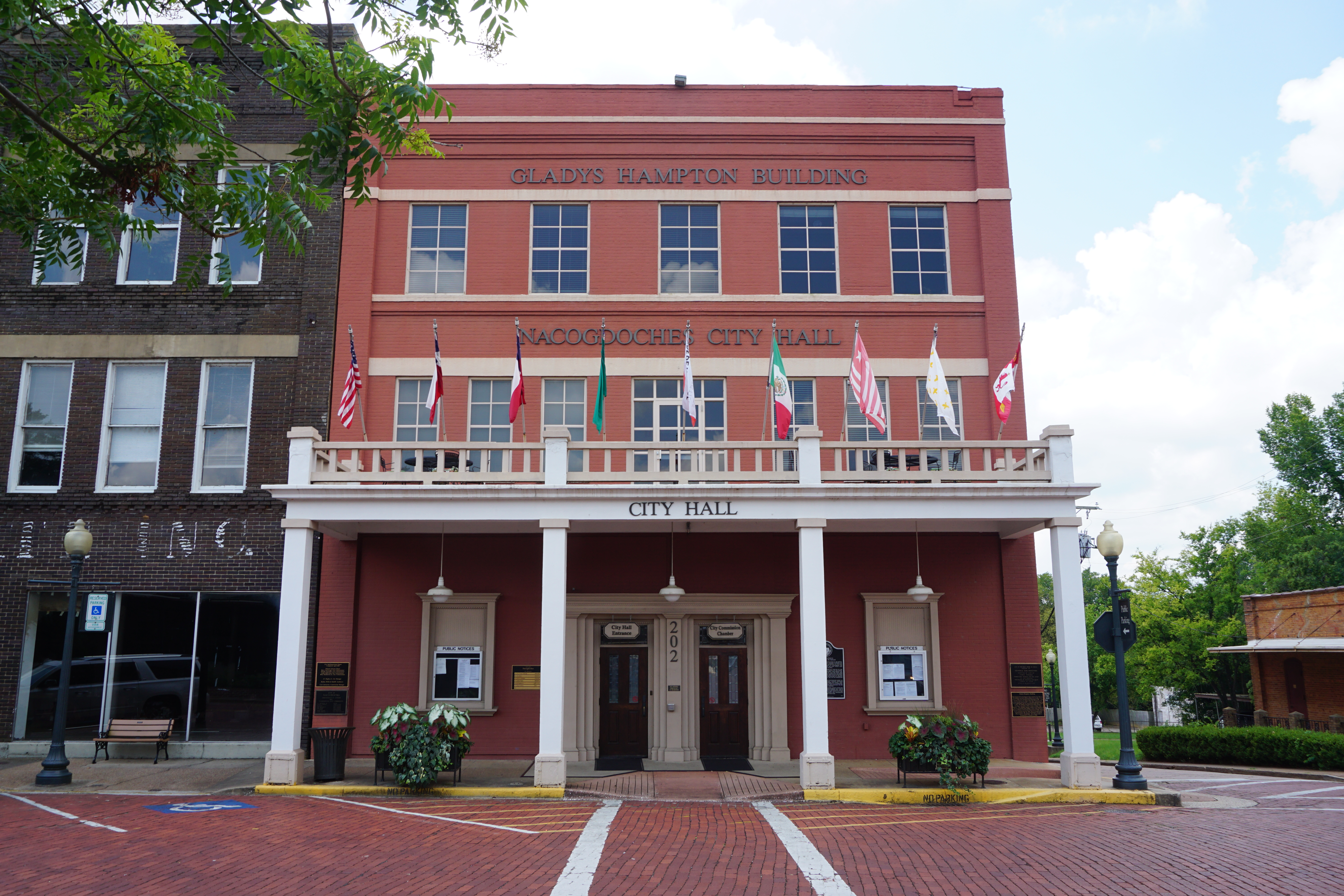
Nacogdoches City Hall

East Texas consists of approximately 38 counties which collaborate in sub-regional Ark-Tex Council of Governments, the East Texas Council of Governments, the Deep East Texas Council of Governments, and the South East Texas Regional Planning Commission, with other counties sometimes included in varying sources.

Counties generally included are Anderson, Angelina, Bowie, Camp, Cass, Cherokee, Delta, Franklin, Gregg, Hardin, Harrison, Henderson, Hopkins, Houston, Jasper, Jefferson, Lamar, Marion, Morris, Nacogdoches, Newton, Orange, Panola, Polk, Rains, Red River, Rusk, Sabine, San Augustine, San Jacinto, Shelby, Smith, Titus, Trinity, Tyler, Upshur, Van Zandt, and Wood County, Texas.

Hunt and Fannin counties, in proximity to Dallas, are sometimes included as part of East Texas in varying sources as part of Northeast Texas, while Chambers, Liberty, and Walker counties, in proximity to the city of Houston, are sometimes included as part of Southeast Texas.

According to the 2020 U.S. census, these 38 East Texas counties had a total population of 1,918,628 residents. Of the 38 counties, the average population density is around 69.6 people per mi^{2}, with the population density near the Big Thicket dropping below 18 people per mi^{2}. Southeast Texas's population is centered around the Golden Triangle of Beaumont/Port Arthur/Orange. Moving north from the coast, Lufkin and Nacogdoches anchor the population center of Deep East Texas. Continuing north from Deep East Texas, Tyler, Longview, and Marshall in Northeast Texas, along with Texarkana on the far northeastern border with Arkansas, represent the major population centers in the northern section of East Texas. Eight miles from the Texas border, Shreveport, Louisiana, is considered the economic and cultural center for the Ark-La-Tex, the area where Arkansas, Louisiana, and East Texas meet.

Per the 2023 census estimates, the five most populous counties were:

1. Jefferson County (251,496)
2. Smith County (245,209)
3. Gregg County (126,243)
4. Bowie County (91,687)
5. Angelina County (87,319)

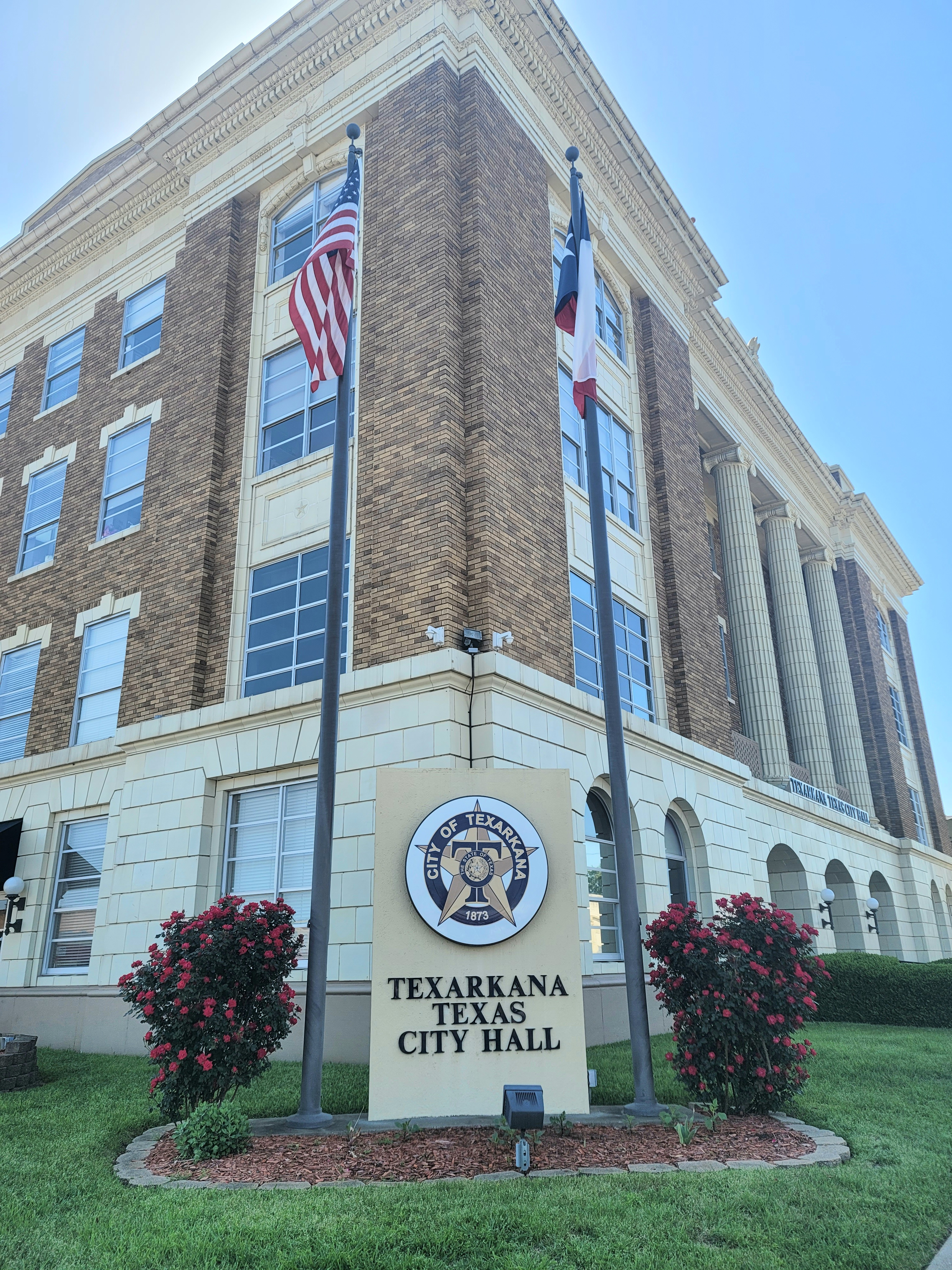
Texarkana, Texas City Hall

Per the 2022 census estimates, the ten most populous East Texas cities outside of Houston's metro area were:

1. Beaumont (112,089)
2. Tyler (109,286)
3. Longview (82,531)
4. Port Arthur (55,479)
5. Huntsville (47,351) (Huntsville, Walker County, Texas is not always included as part of East Texas.)
6. Texarkana (35,778) (TX side only, 65,084 when combined with Texarkana, AR)
7. Lufkin (34,152)
8. Nacogdoches (31,990)
9. Paris (24,695)
10. Marshall (23,641)

In 2020, the population of East Texas counties was 61.8% non-Hispanic white, 16.4% Hispanic or Latino American, 16.3% African American, and 4.2% other (including Native American and Asian). East Texas's most ethnically and racially diverse county was Jefferson County, its largest county.

East Texas is within the Black Belt region, the fertile area that was the center of cotton culture and enslaved African-American labor. Relative to other regions of Texas, East Texas formerly had the highest percentage of Black population in the state.

In contrast to the demography of Texas as a whole, only two counties in East Texas outside of Greater Houston's sphere had a majority-minority population. In 2020, Jefferson County in the Golden Triangle had a non-Hispanic white plurality of 37.44% and Titus County had a 43.78% Hispanic or Latino plurality. East Texas and Southeast Texas in particular, which had been areas with cotton plantations before the Civil War, have a significant African-American population, ranging to nearly 20% in some counties.

== Transportation ==
East Texas is home to East Texas Regional Airport and Tyler Pounds Regional Airport.

== Politics ==
East Texas Presidential election results
Year	Democratic	Republican	Third parties
2024	23.4% 196,703	75.8% 636,994	0.8% 6,651
2020	26.1% 218,265'	72.8% 608,479	1.1% 9,410
2016	25.2% 182,891	72.0% 522,891	2.8% 20,413
2012	28.9% 199,204	71.1% 490,905	0% 0
2008	31.9% 226,287	67.1% 476,238	1.0% 7,008
2004	34.1% 236,860	65.9% 457,323	0% 0
2000	37.4% 231,128	62.6% 387,258	0% 0
1996	45.0% 261,012	46.8% 271,859	8.2% 47,565
1992	40.44% 250,170	37.23% 230,323	22.13% 136,897
1988	48.0% 275,079	51.38% 294,424	0.61% 3,522
1984	40.39% 235,418	59.29% 345,598	0.32% 1,840
1980	48.25% 240,468	49.99% 249,146	1.16% 5,767
1976	56.64% 249,578	42.82% 188,686	0.54% 2,373

== Culture ==
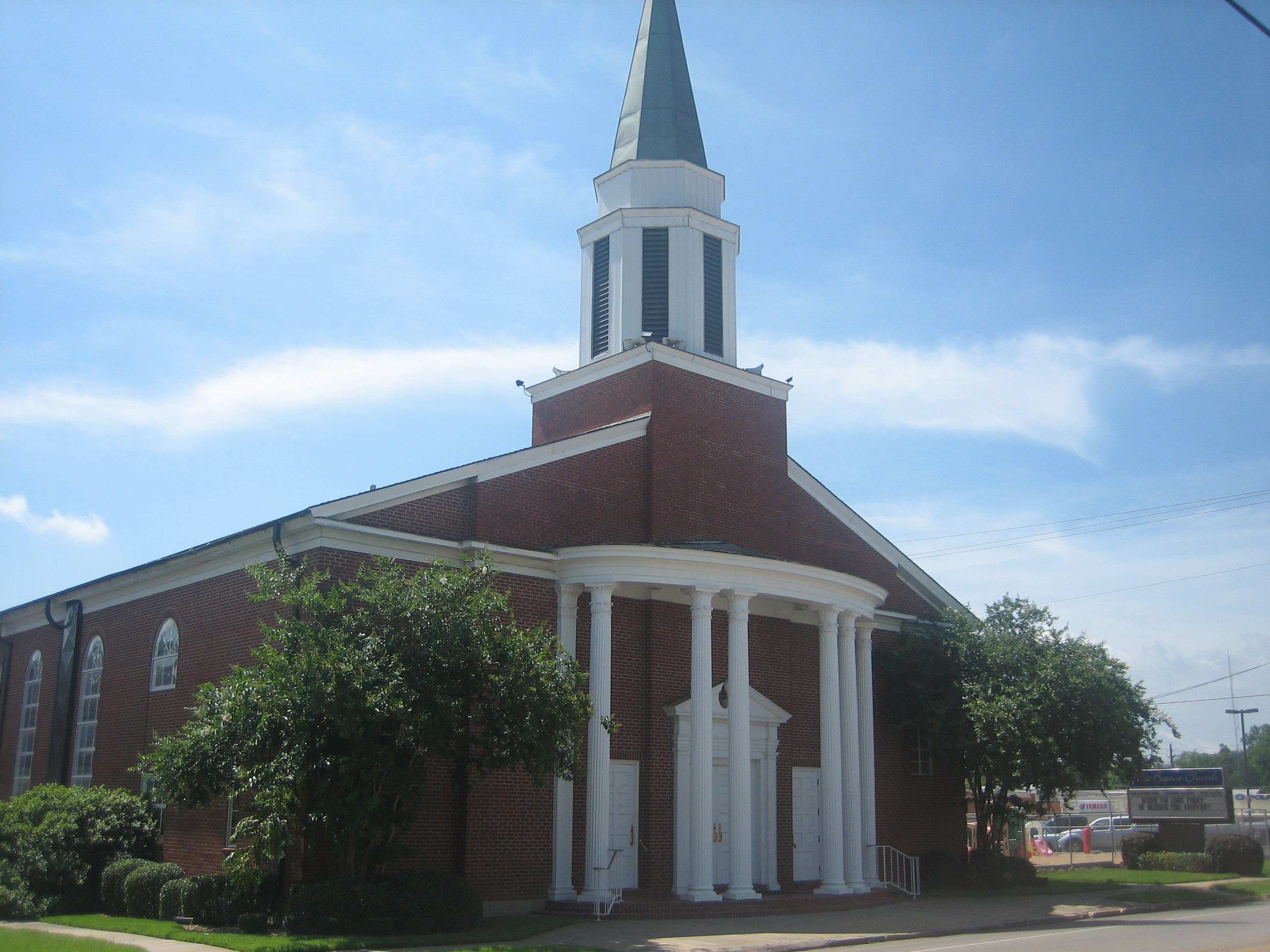
First Baptist Church at 117 Cora Street in Center, Texas, is located next to the downtown section.

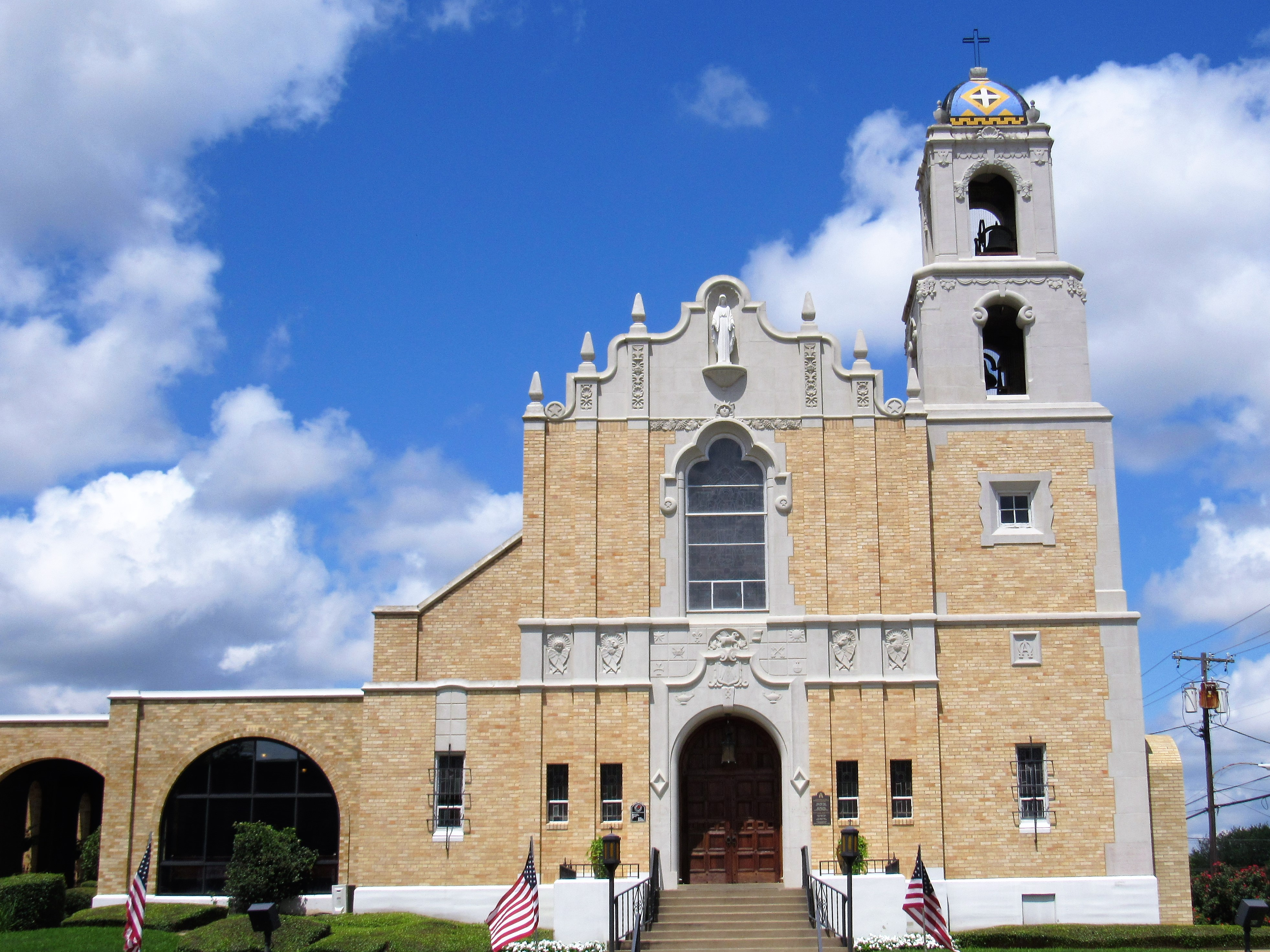
Cathedral of the Immaculate Conception in Tyler, Texas

East Texas is often considered the westernmost extension of the Deep South. The predominant cultural influence comes from customs and traditions passed down from European American and African American Southerners who settled the region during the mid-to-late 19th century. African Americans were first brought to the area as enslaved workers to develop and cultivate commodity crops on plantations. Harrison County had the most plantations and highest number of slaves in the antebellum period. Deep South accent influences are noticeable in the subdialect of Texan English that is spoken throughout the region. According to the most recent linguistic studies, East Texans tend to pronounce Southern English with the drawl typical of the Lower South. Other parts of Texas are more apt to use the "twang" of the Upper South, or—depending upon demographic influences of the particular area—with some Hispanic and Midwestern traits.

East Texas lacks the strong influence of late 19th-and early 20th-century European immigrants from Germany and central Europe. Similarly, the new waves of immigrants since the late 20th century, primarily from India, other Asian nations, and Latin America, and their influences, have been less prevalent in East Texas compared to other Texas regions.

East Texans are predominantly Protestant Christians. They are members of many denominations as part of the Bible Belt. The most numerous Christian adherents have included the Baptists, particularly the Southern Baptist Convention (majority white) and National Baptist Convention USA (majority black, formed after the Civil War); Methodists and Presbyterians; Lutherans and classical Pentecostals; and others.

Roman Catholicism continues to have influence, particularly given the increased Hispanic or Latino American population in recent decades. The largest Catholic jurisdictions in the region has been the Roman Catholic Archdiocese of Galveston-Houston in Southeast Texas, and the Roman Catholic Diocese of Tyler in the northeastern subregion.

Other religious faiths with smaller numbers, but with adherents in East Texas, include Mormonism and Judaism.

Significant numbers of people of Cajun and Creole descent have migrated from Louisiana, although most are assimilated partially or completely into East Texas culture (adopting the local culture, and losing to varying degrees, their original culture). This assimilation pattern has often historically included conversion from Roman Catholicism, associated with French and Spanish traditions, to Protestant denominations.

United States settlers from the Protestant Southeast practiced some discrimination against Cajun and Creole migrants, a cultural attitude that persisted until quite recently. Despite the tendency toward assimilation, Cajun and Creole cuisine (for example, jambalaya and catfish gumbo), are popular in the region. Many East Texans, including those without Louisiana roots, are known to be expert at preparing at least some well-known Louisiana dishes.

While some East Texans associate with cowboy culture, most identify more with smaller scale farming of the Southern U.S., than with the expansive cattle ranching of the plains regions of Texas. But East Texans commonly own and trade cattle. Several "sale barns" exist across East Texas, with weekly and monthly trades, as is common in other parts of the Deep South.

In the northern part of East Texas, awareness of the native and historical Caddo Mississippian culture remains. Cherokee County is home to the Caddo Mounds State Historic Site. Patrons can also view the "Caddo Indian Collection" at the Gregg County Historical Museum in Longview. In the mid-1800s, East Texas cities such as Marshall and Jefferson constituted a sphere of influence that led the entire state into the Confederacy. East Texas had powerful planters and the most significant numbers of slaveholders.

Before that, during the Mexican and Republic periods, Nacogdoches and San Augustine were the most developed and influential cities in East Texas. Many East Texans have a mixture of European and Native American ancestry, as seen in East Texan country artist Miranda Lambert. The Museum of East Texas opened in Lufkin in 1976 under the name Lufkin Historical and Creative Arts Center.

=== Music ===
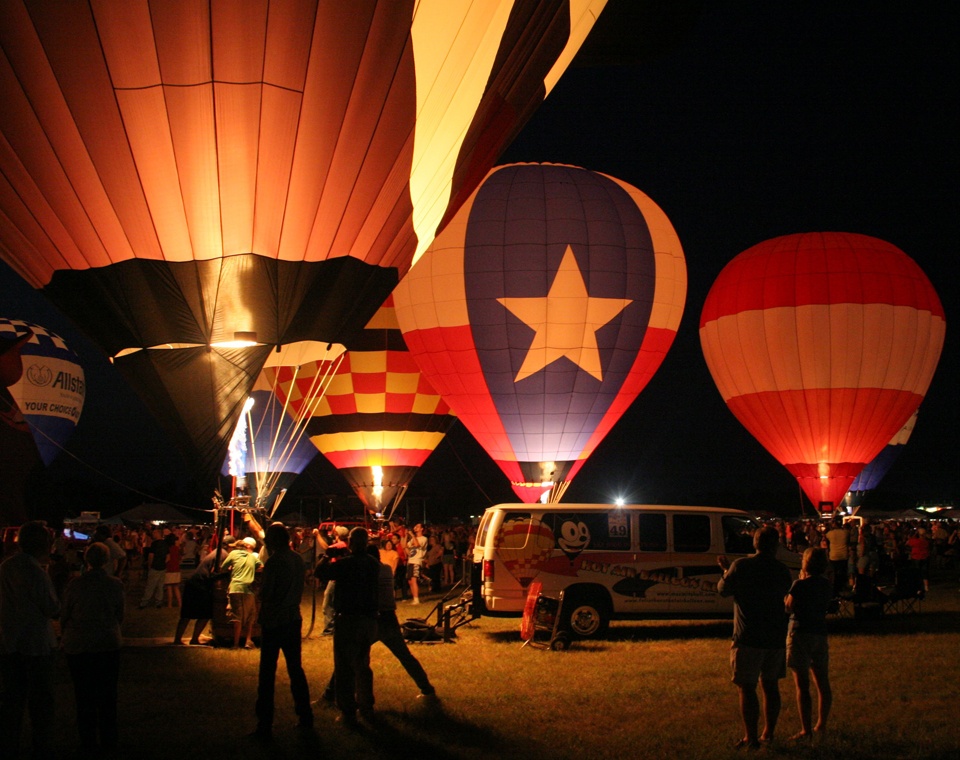
The Balloon Glow was first performed at the Great Texas Balloon Race.

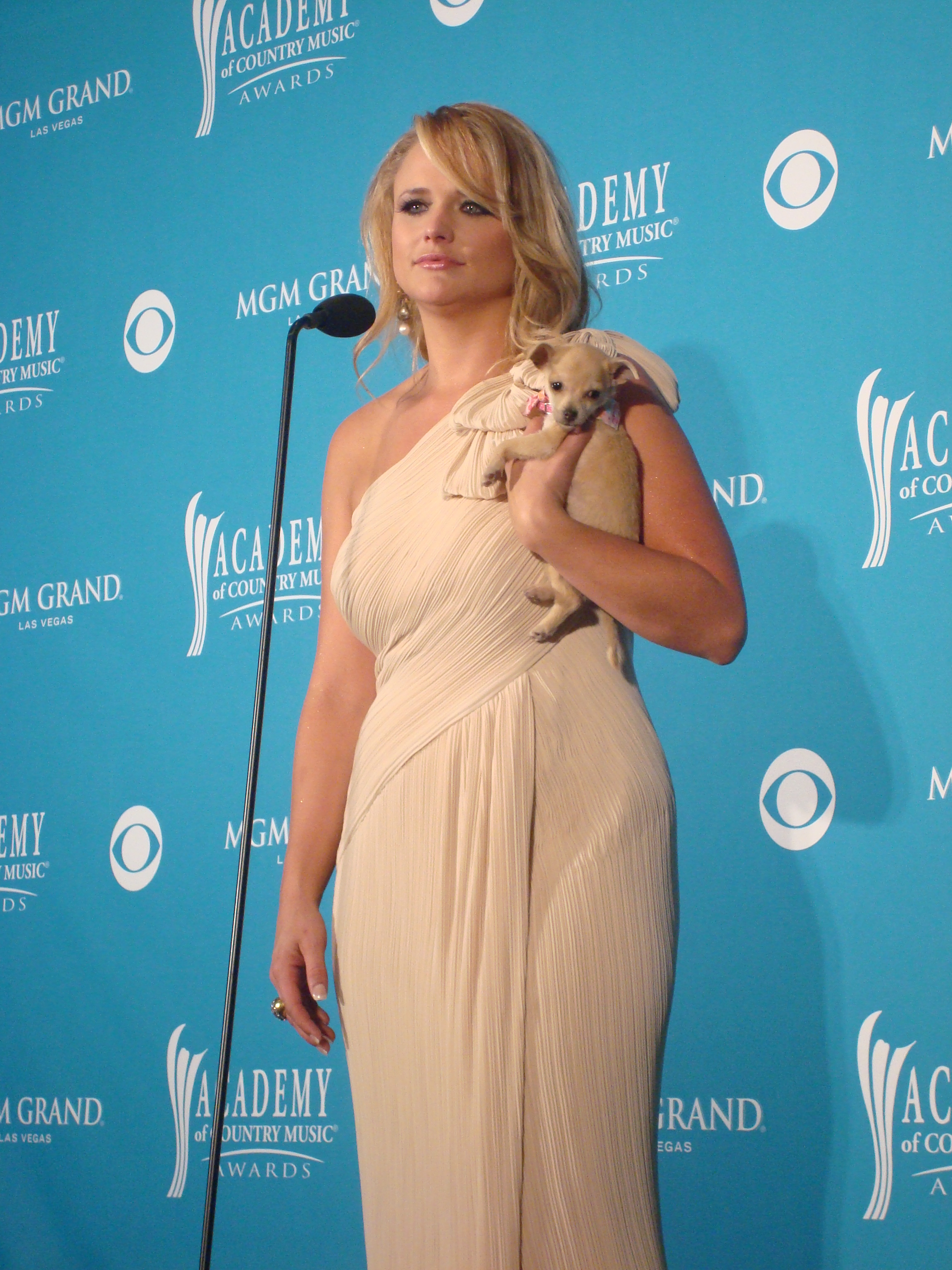
Miranda Lambert in the press room at the 2010 Academy of Country Music Awards

East Texas is home to the Texas Country Music Hall of Fame, located in Carthage. East Texans enjoy a range of music that is influenced by gospel, bluegrass, blues, rock, country, soul, rhythm and blues, and Cajun. Texas blues originated in East Texas, with many legends having been born in the region, including Lightnin' Hopkins and T-Bone Walker. East Texans enjoy live music at many of the region's fairs and festivals, including the Texas Rose Festival in Tyler, the East Texas Yamboree in Gilmer, and Longview's Great Texas Balloon Race.

East Texas also has many venues included in what is commonly referred to as the Texas country music circuit, although the majority of such venues are located in Central/South/West Texas and the metropolitan areas of the state.

Many notable music artists have East Texas roots, including: George Jones (Saratoga), Miranda Lambert (Lindale), Kacey Musgraves (Mineola), Jamie Foxx, (Terrell), Neal McCoy (Longview and Jacksonville), Lee Ann Womack (Jacksonville), Janis Joplin (Port Arthur), UGK (Port Arthur), Don Henley (Linden), Ray Price (Perryville), Johnny Horton (Rusk), Johnny Mathis (Gilmer), Tex Ritter (Panola County), Jim Reeves (Panola County), Mark Chesnutt (Beaumont), Tracy Byrd (Vidor), Clay Walker (Beaumont), T-Bone Walker (Linden), Chris Tomlin (Grand Saline), and Michelle Shocked (Gilmer), among many others.

Worldwide-acclaimed pianist Van Cliburn, a native of nearby Shreveport, Louisiana, was raised in Kilgore. Kilgore College houses the Van Cliburn Auditorium on its home campus.

Many high-school bands in East Texas continue the tradition of military-style marching, unlike other parts of the state. These bands compete in the National Association of Military Marching Bands.

=== Sports and outdoors ===
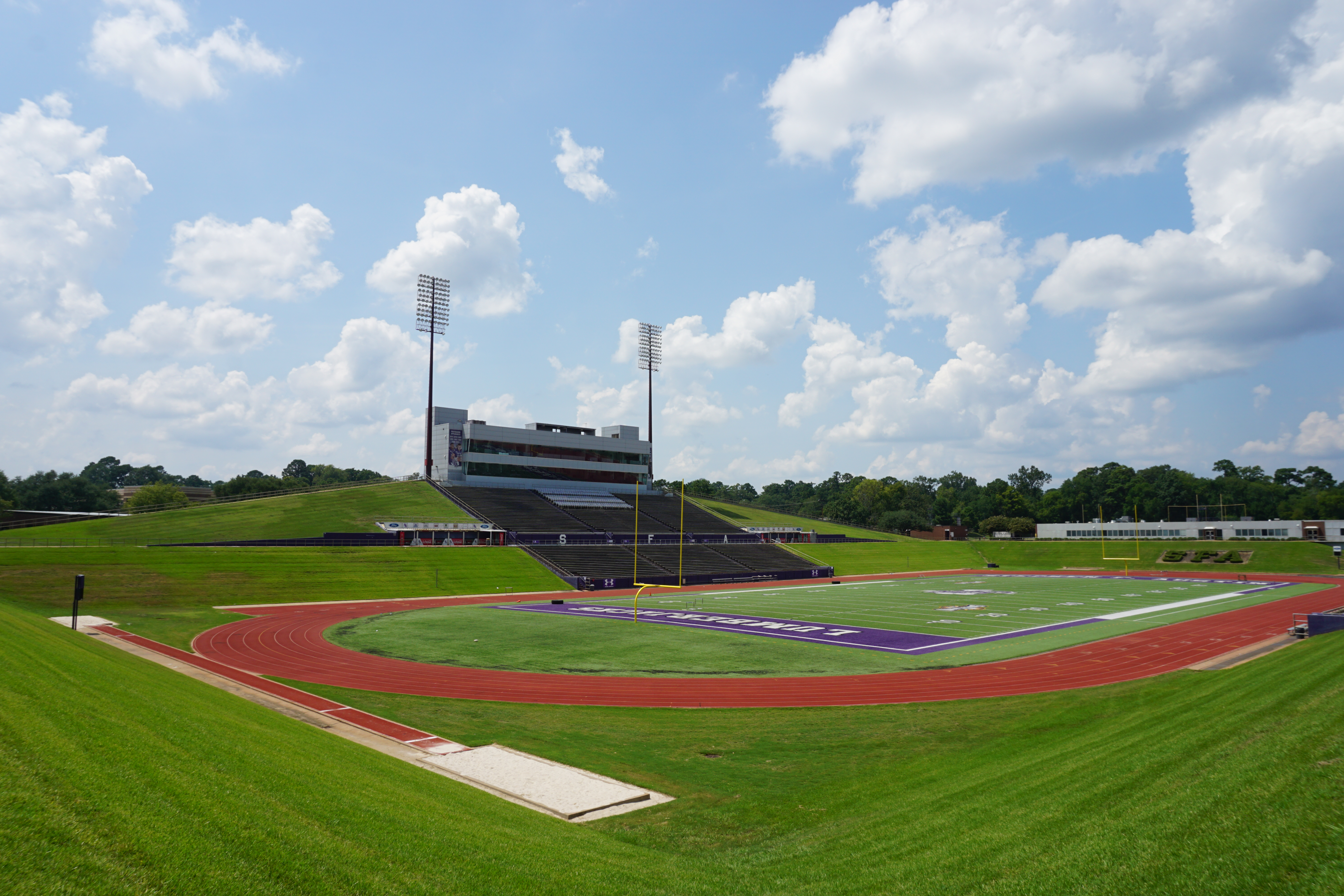
SFA: Homer Bryce Stadium

As with other parts of Texas, high school football is the most popular local sport venue in East Texas. Residents of East Texas towns and rural communities fill high-school stadiums in support of their local teams, cheerleaders, and bands. Many East Texas high-school teams have won Texas state championships, along with producing many collegiate and professional football players.

Earl Campbell, the "Tyler Rose", played football for John Tyler High in Tyler before playing for the Texas Longhorns and the Houston Oilers. Don Meredith, who famously played for the Dallas Cowboys, played at Mt. Vernon. Dez Bryant, a football player from Lufkin, formerly played wide receiver for the Dallas Cowboys before signing with the New Orleans Saints (then getting injured three days afterwards). Adrian Peterson, a star running back for the Minnesota Vikings, played high-school football in Palestine. Many other high-school sports are popular in East Texas, including basketball, baseball, volleyball, softball, and track.

A significant number of East Texan youths participate in Little League Baseball, soccer, and softball. Church leagues are quite common in providing opportunities for basketball and softball for youth and adults alike. In recent years, cowboy churches have grown in number and offer rodeo events for their youth.

East Texans also enjoy collegiate athletic competition. Most residents support collegiate teams located in other regions of the state, such as the Texas A&M Aggies, Texas Longhorns, Texas Tech Red Raiders, Baylor Bears, TCU Horned Frogs, and Houston Cougars. Due to proximity to neighboring states, East Texas has a substantial number of fans of the LSU Tigers, Arkansas Razorbacks, Oklahoma State Cowboys, and Oklahoma Sooners. The Battle of the Piney Woods has historically been a fiercely contested sports rivalry between the Bearkats of Sam Houston State University in Huntsville and the Lumberjacks of Stephen F. Austin State University (SFA) in Nacogdoches. Both schools long competed as members of the NCAA Division I Southland Conference (SLC), which plays football at the FCS level, but they moved to the Western Athletic Conference (WAC) in 2021, while Sam Houston moved to FBS and joined Conference USA in July 2023. The Cardinals of Lamar University in Beaumont left the SLC for the WAC alongside Sam Houston and SFA, but rejoined the SLC a year later. East Texas A&M University joined the SLC in 2022.

Other universities and colleges that field athletic teams in East Texas include East Texas Baptist University Tigers in Marshall; University of Texas at Tyler Patriots in Tyler; LeTourneau University Yellowjackets in Longview; and several junior colleges throughout the region, which participate in the Southwest Junior College Conference in Region XIV of the NJCAA. East Texas is also home to the Kilgore College Rangerettes, a world-famous dance team that debuted in 1939.

A few professional sports teams are located in the traditionally defined East Texas. The East Texas Pump Jacks, located in Kilgore, play baseball in the Texas Collegiate League. Additionally, the East Texas Storm, a semiprofessional football team located in Tyler, competes in the Lone Star Minor League. Typically, northern parts of East Texas tend to support the professional teams from the Dallas/Fort Worth area in North Texas (Dallas Cowboys, Dallas Mavericks, Texas Rangers, Dallas Stars, FC Dallas), while southern parts of East Texas tend to support professional teams from the Houston area in Southeast Texas (Houston Texans, Houston Rockets, Houston Astros, Houston Dynamo FC).

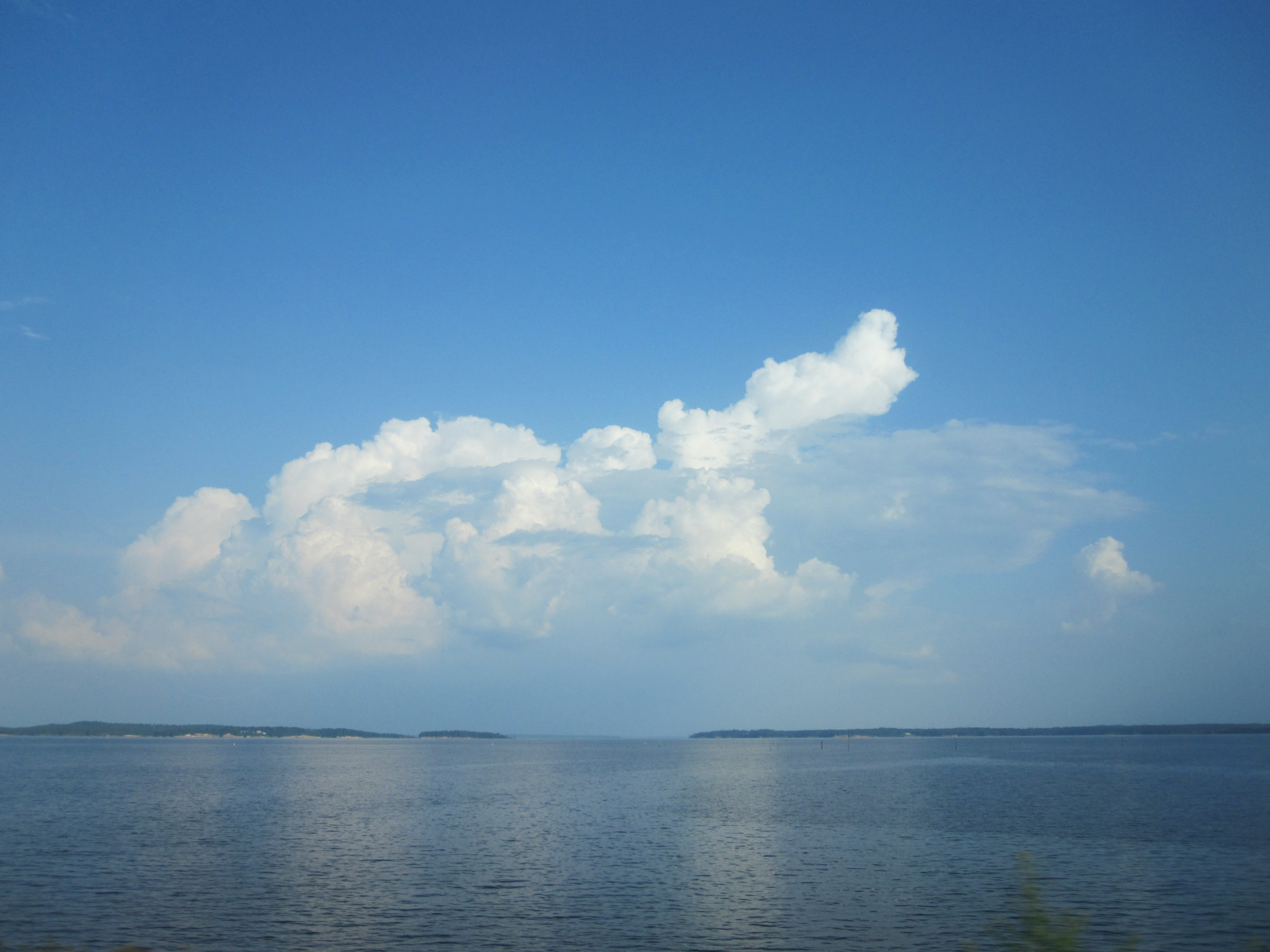
Toledo Bend Reservoir on the Louisiana and Texas border

As with other parts of Texas and/or the Southern U.S., other popular sporting activities in East Texas include rodeo (including PRCA), hunting, and fishing. Prominent rodeos in East Texas are held in Beaumont, Nacogdoches, Paris, Longview, Gladewater, Huntsville, Lufkin, Athens, Palestine, and Lindale. East Texas contains several award-winning lakes for sport fishing, including Toledo Bend Reservoir, Lake Sam Rayburn, Lake Livingston, Lake Fork Reservoir, and Lake Tawakoni.

East Texas also contains numerous golf courses and avid golfers, as well as NASCAR fans. However, the region does not host professional events in either of those sports. The nearest NASCAR track to East Texas is Texas Motor Speedway in Fort Worth.

East Texans enjoy many Texas state parks, including Caddo Lake, Atlanta, Daingerfield, Lake Bob Sandlin, Tyler, Mission Tejas in Grapeland, Cooper Lake, Lake Tawakoni, Martin Creek, Huntsville, Lake Sam Rayburn, Lake Livingston and Sea Rim among others. East Texas is also home to the Angelina National Forest, Davy Crockett National Forest, Sam Houston National Forest, Sabine National Forest, Big Thicket National Preserve, Trinity River National Wildlife Refuge, Jocelyn Nungaray National Wildlife Refuge, and McFaddin National Wildlife Refuge.

== Economy ==
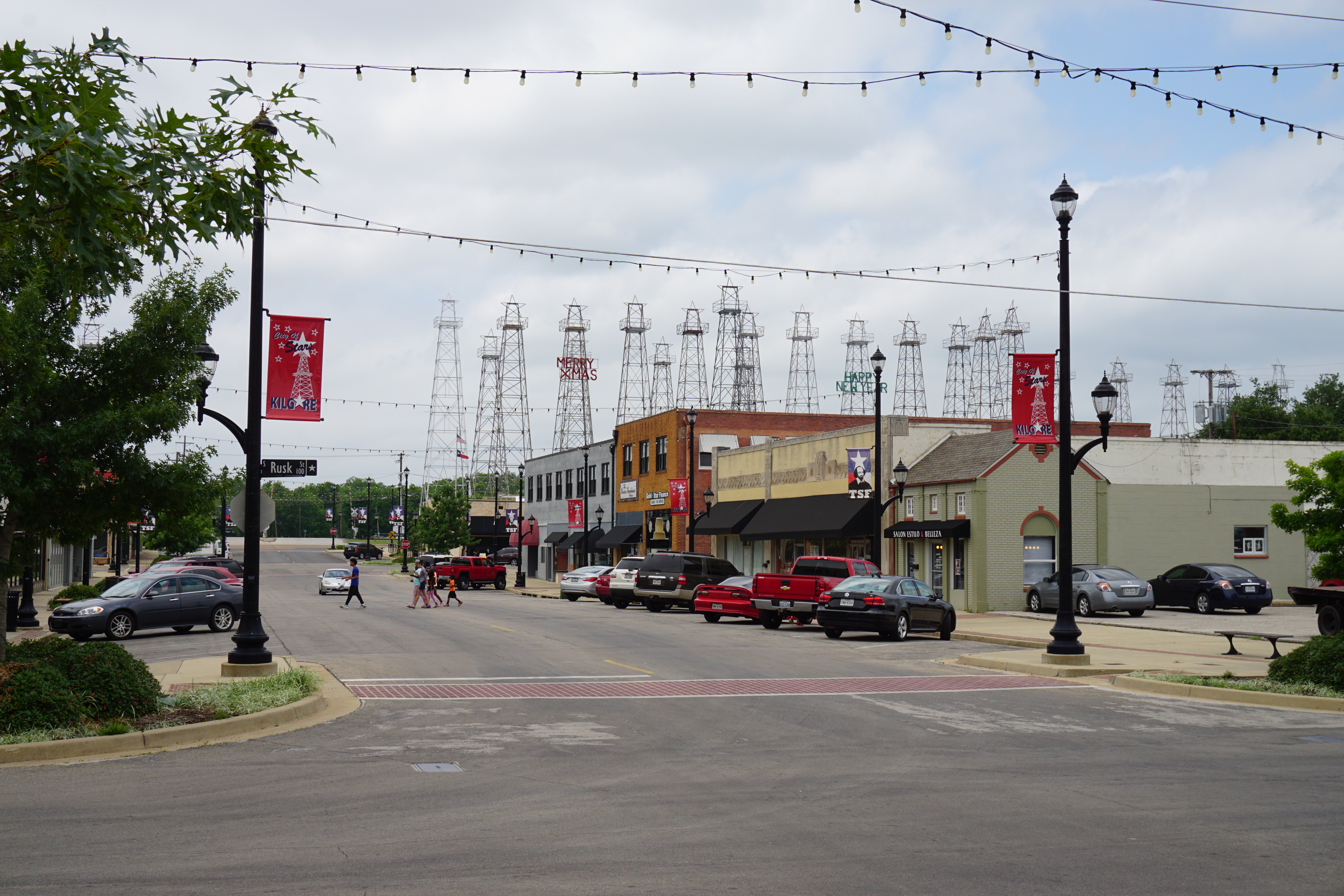
Ornamental oil derricks in Kilgore

=== Industry ===
Historically, the East Texas economy has been led by lumber, cotton, cattle, and oil. Prior to the discovery of the East Texas Oil Field, cotton, lumber and cattle were the predominant source of economic growth and stability. The needs of local farmers contributed greatly to the establishment of local towns and trading posts. As with many parts of the nation, the chosen paths of railroads often determined the continuation of many towns. At the beginning of the 20th century, the oil fields were discovered and oil became accessible, changing the future of the region.

In the decades leading to the new millennium, crude oil production in the East Texas Oil Field, the largest oil field in the United States, somewhat decreased. In turn, the number of high-paying jobs for uneducated workers also decreased. During the 20th century, local groceries, general stores, and cafes were replaced with franchise department stores, retail chains, and fast-food restaurants. Due to the decline of oil production, many small towns closed cafés and gas stations, some of which were replaced with cash loan shops and pawn shops. In 2022, East Texas was highlighted for its diversifying economy penetrating Deep East Texas with the decline in crude oil. Additionally, the region has become home to many patent-holding companies, due to its legal system being particularly friendly to patent holders and hostile to out-of-state tech defendants. In 2009, Paul Knight of the Houston Press stated in an article, "some say natural gas has surpassed crude as king in East Texas."

Tourism has not been a highly significant source of economic activity in the majority of East Texas, although several high-traffic corridors pass through East Texas, which have aided economic development along those routes. These include: Interstate 30 (from Dallas through Texarkana), Interstate 20 (through Dallas and on through Shreveport), Interstate 10 (through Houston and Beaumont into Louisiana), Interstate 45 (through Houston and Dallas), and U.S. Highway 59 (through Houston and north past Texarkana; in process of being upgraded along most of the route to Interstate 69).

=== Poverty ===
East Texas is one of the most economically disadvantaged regions in the state. In 2021 the poverty rate in the greater northeast Texas area (Anderson, Bowie, Camp, Cass, Cherokee, Delta, Franklin, Gregg, Harrison, Henderson, Hopkins, Lamar, Marion, Morris, Panola, Rains, Red River, Rusk, Smith, Titus, Upshur, Van Zandt, and Wood counties) was 16%, higher than both the state rate, 14.7%, and the national rate at 13.4%. In the same year 13.4% of households received Food Stamps or SNAP compared to 11.8% across Texas, and 11.7% nationwide. As of January 2022. The average wage in the region was also lower than the state and national average at $45,027, which were $62,289 and $64,555 respectively.

== Notable people ==
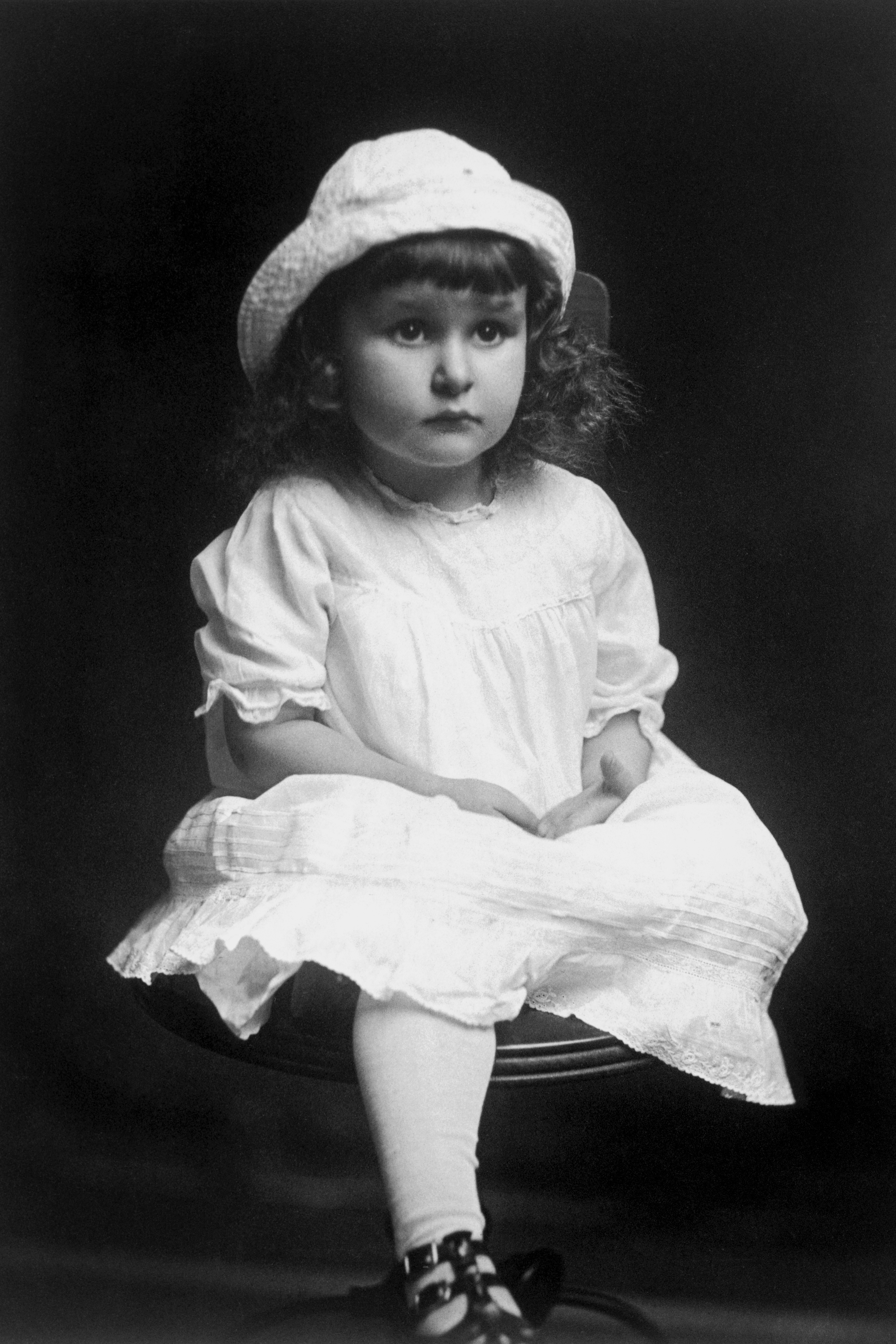
Lady Bird Taylor Johnson around age three in East Texas

- Bobbie R. Allen, naval aviator and aviation safety pioneer, Winnsboro, Wood County
- Sandy Duncan, actor, Henderson, Rusk County and Tyler, Smith County
- George Foreman, former professional boxer, Marshall, Harrison County
- Jamie Foxx, actor and comedian, Terrell, Kaufman County
- Sam Houston, former president of the Republic of Texas, former governor of Texas, retired in Huntsville, Walker County
- Lady Bird Johnson, former first lady of the United States, born in Karnack, Harrison County
- George Jones, country music singer born in Saratoga, Hardin County
- Mary Karr, poet and memoirist, Groves, Jefferson County
- Joe R. Lansdale, author and martial arts expert, born in Gladewater, Gregg County
- Richard Linklater, film-maker, Huntsville, Walker County
- Margo Martindale, actor, Jacksonville, Cherokee County
- Matthew McConaughey, actor, Longview, Gregg County
- Neal McCoy, musician, Longview, Gregg County
- Ross Perot, businessman and former U.S. presidential candidate, born in Texarkana, Bowie County
- Adrian Peterson, former NFL running back, Palestine, Anderson County
- Lonnie "Bo" Pilgrim, founder of Pilgrim's Pride Chicken, Pittsburg, Camp County
- Jim Reeves, musician and pioneer of Countrypolitan, Galloway, Panola County
- Tex Ritter, musician and actor, Carthage, Panola County
- Carroll Shelby, racer and car developer known for Shelby Cobra and numerous Ford and Chrysler products, Leesburg, Camp County
- Tye Sheridan, actor, Elkhart, Anderson County
- Sissy Spacek, actor, Quitman, Wood County
- Hank Thompson, musician and pioneer of honky tonk, Waco, McLennan County
- William B. Travis, commander at the Alamo, settled in Anahuac, Chambers County
- Forest Whitaker, actor, Longview, Gregg County
- Former United States senators:
  - Horace Chilton, born near Tyler, Smith County
  - Charles Allen Culberson, settled in Gilmer, Upshur County and Jefferson, Marion County
  - James W. Flanagan, settled in Henderson, Rusk County
  - Samuel B. Maxey, settled in and practiced law in Paris, Lamar County
  - John Henninger Reagan, practiced law in Palestine and Henderson County
  - Thomas Jefferson Rusk, settled in Nacogdoches, Nacogdoches County, and was also a chief justice of the Supreme Court of the Republic of Texas
  - Morris Sheppard, born in Morris County
  - Matthias Ward, settled in Clarksville, Red River County and Jefferson, Marion County
  - Louis Wigfall, lived in Nacogdoches, Nacogdoches County and Marshall, Harrison County
  - Ralph Yarborough, born in Chandler, Henderson County
- Other former governors of Texas:
  - Thomas Mitchell Campbell, born in Rusk, Cherokee County
  - Oscar Branch Colquitt, newspaper owner in Pittsburg, Camp County and Morris County
  - Price Daniel, born in Dayton, Liberty County
  - James Pinckney Henderson, first governor of Texas, practiced law in San Augustine, San Augustine County
  - William P. Hobby, born in Moscow, Polk County
  - Jim Hogg, born in Rusk, Cherokee County
  - Richard B. Hubbard, lived in Tyler, Smith County and Lindale, Smith County
  - Allan Shivers, born in Lufkin, Angelina County
  - Ross S. Sterling, born in Anahuac, Chambers County
  - Mark White, born in Henderson, Rusk County
  - George Tyler Wood, second governor of Texas, settled near Point Blank in Liberty County and San Jacinto County

== See also ==
- List of geographical regions in Texas
- List of Texas regions
- List of museums in East Texas
- East Texas Oil Field
- Greater Houston
- Texas Country Music Hall of Fame
- Texas State Railroad
- Battle of the Piney Woods
- Southwest Junior College Conference
- First Monday Trade Days of Canton, Texas
- Golden Triangle (Texas)
- United States District Court for the Eastern District of Texas
