= Northeast Texas =

- Region
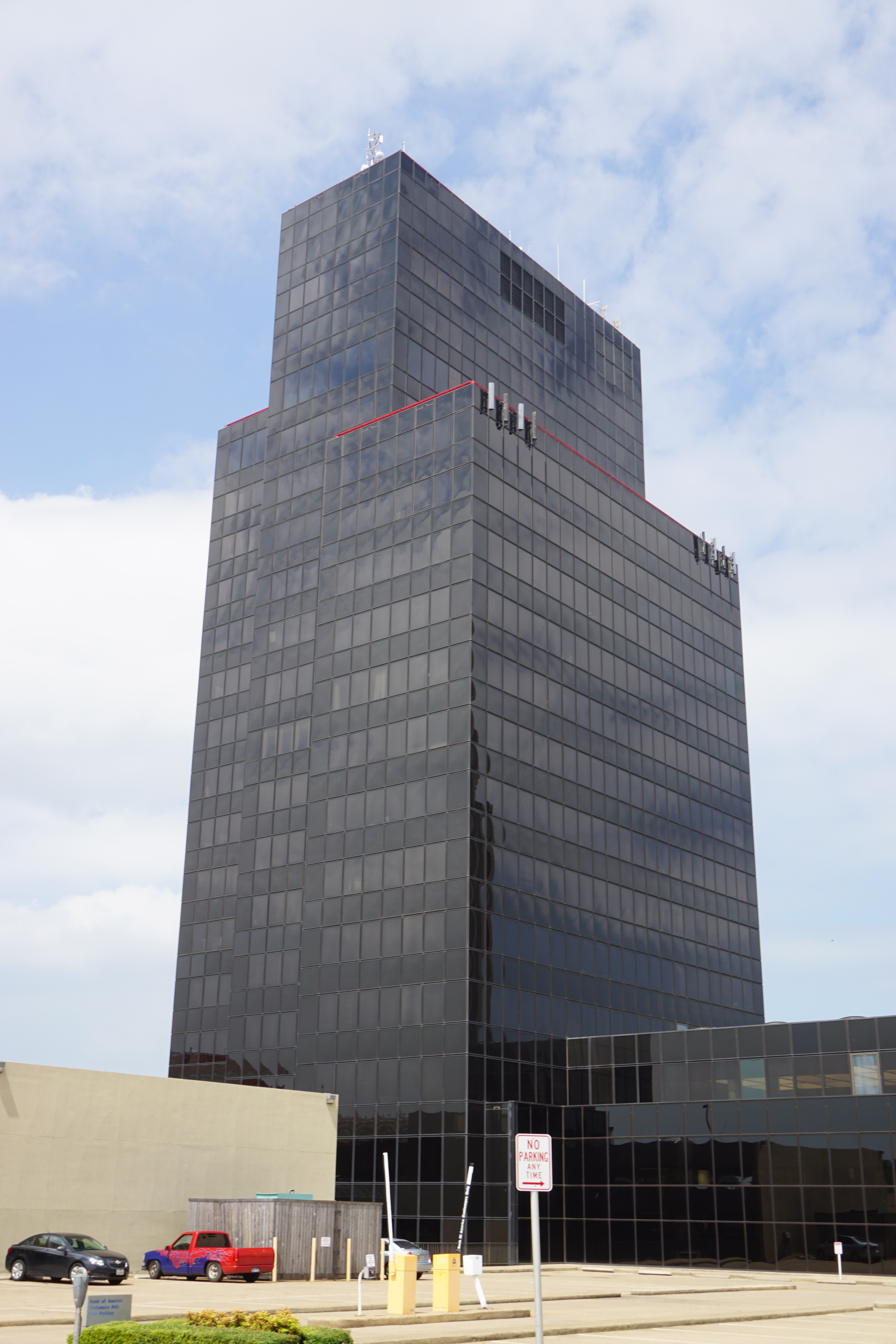
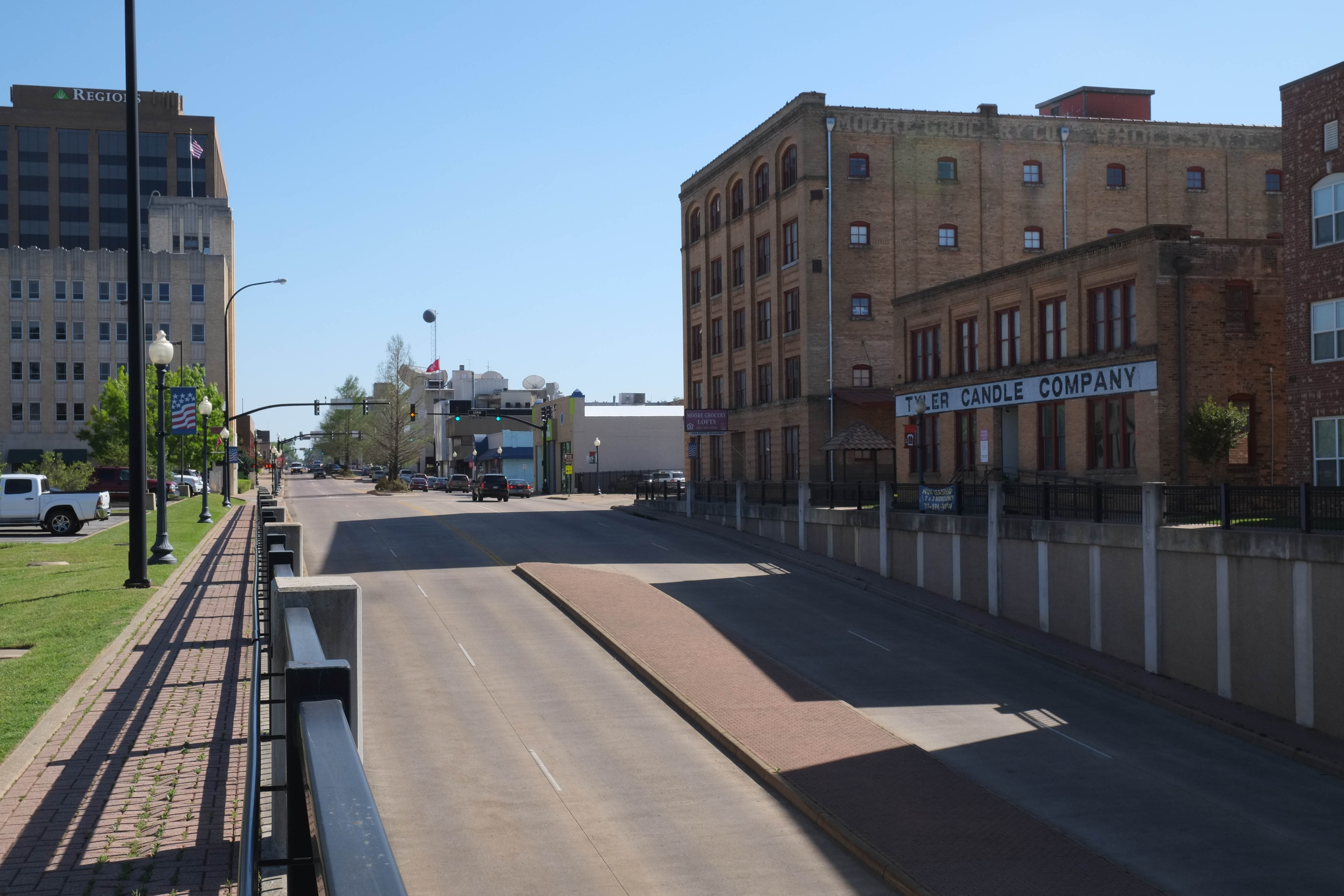
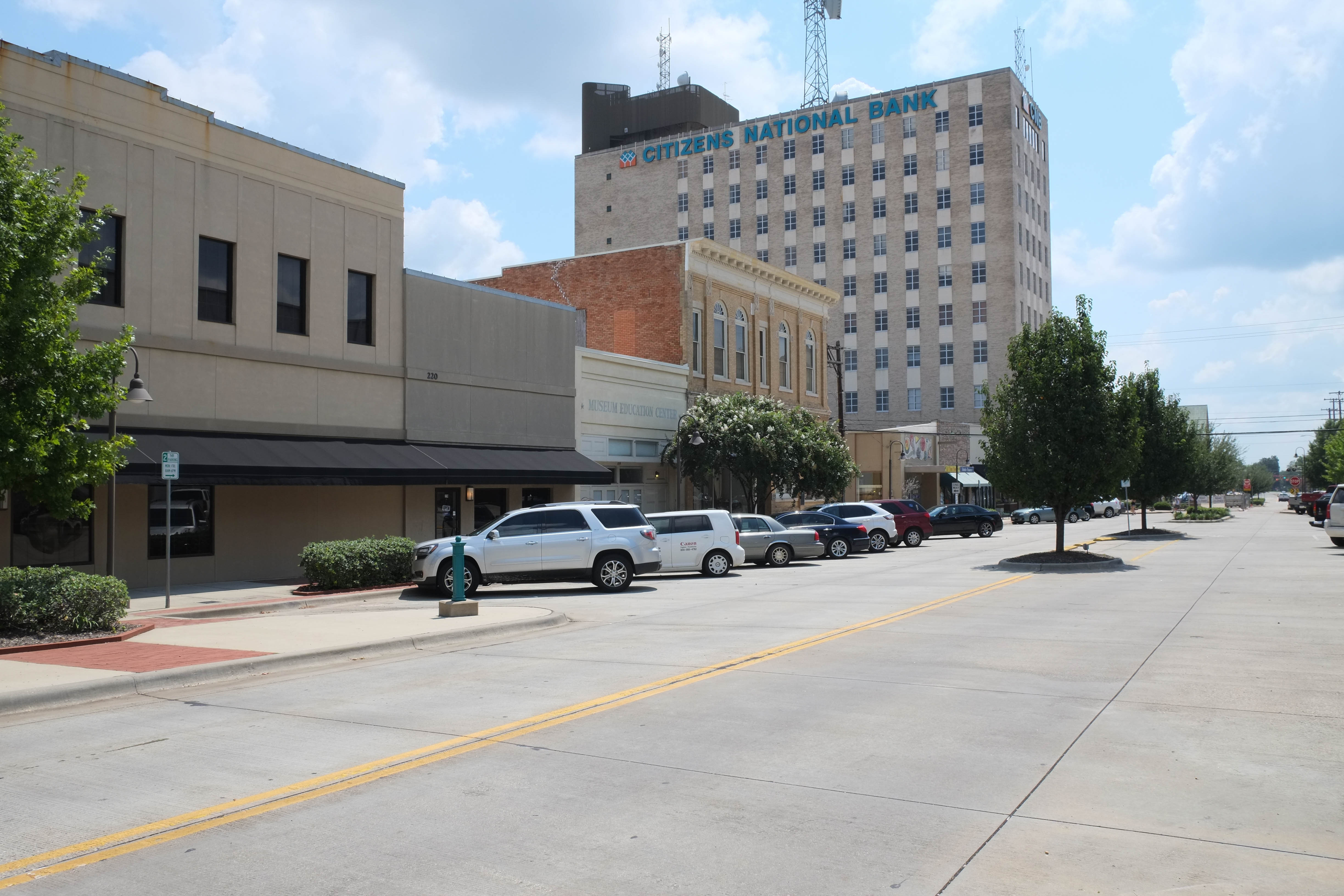
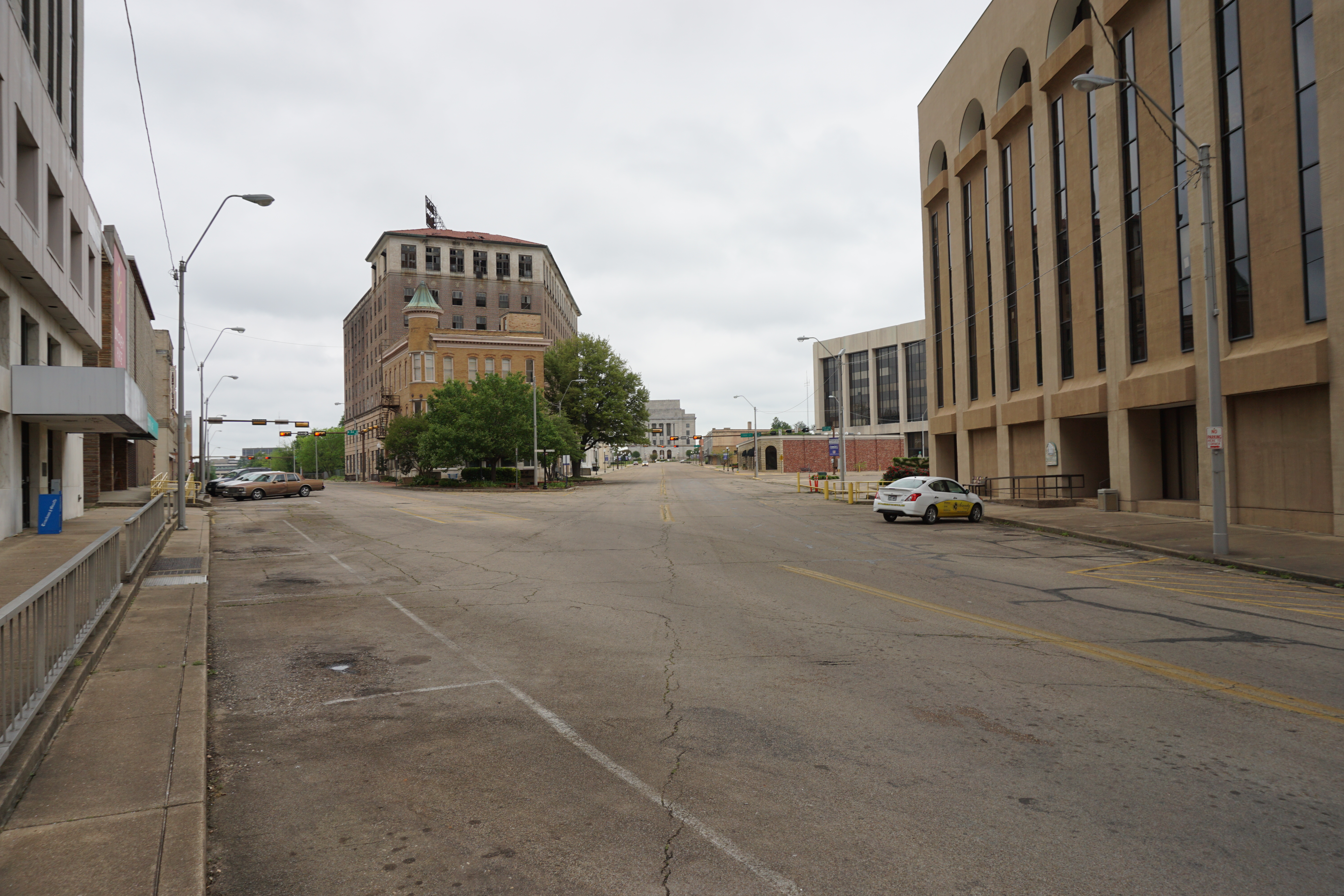
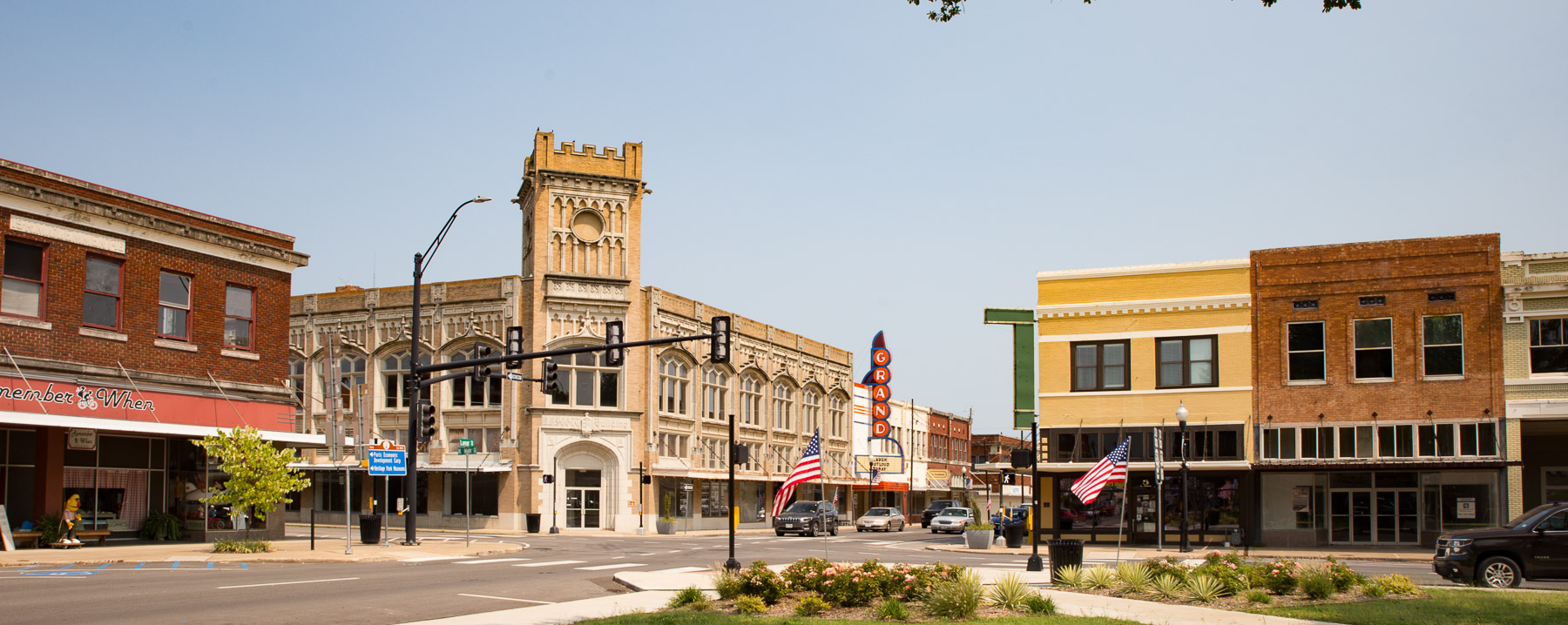
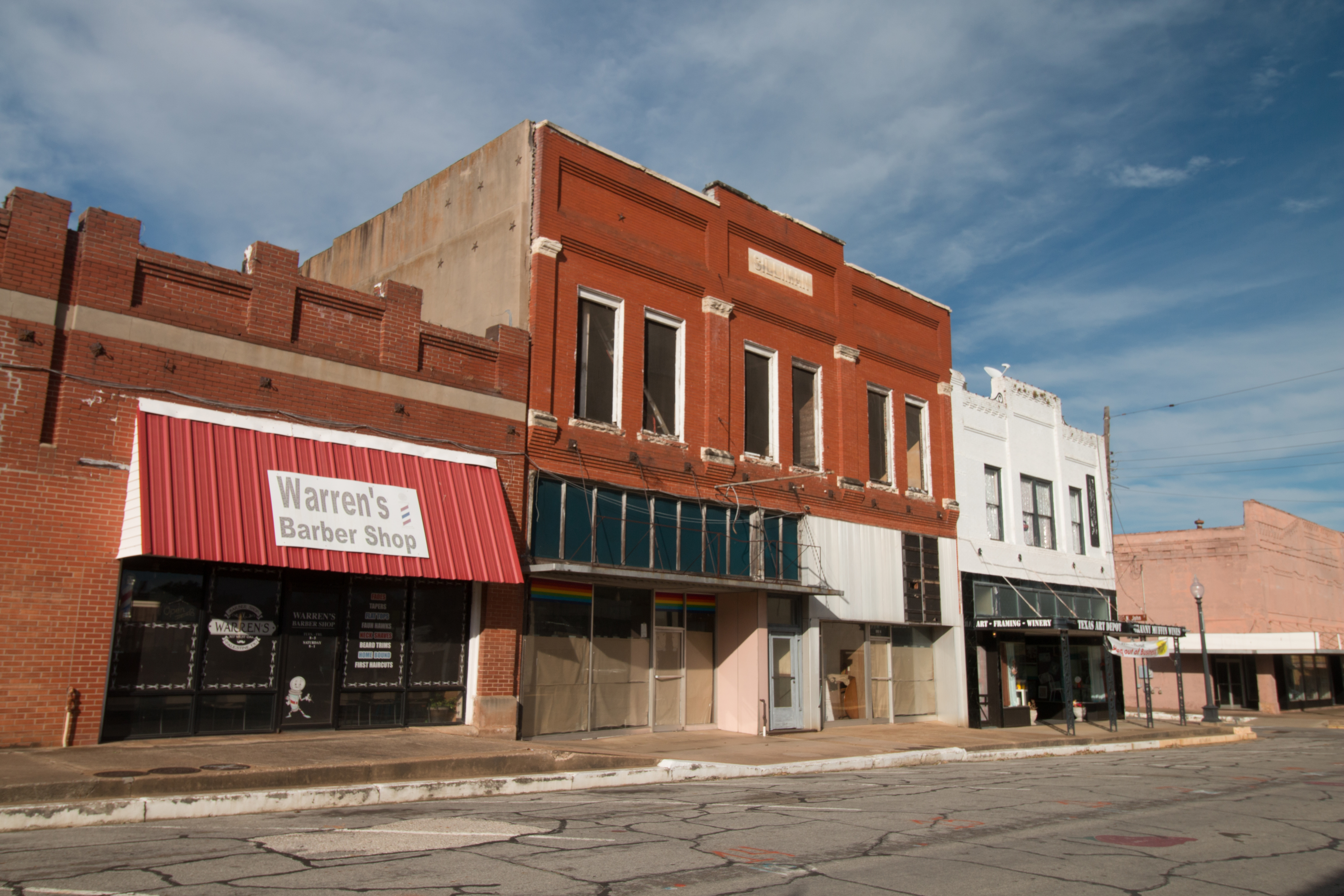
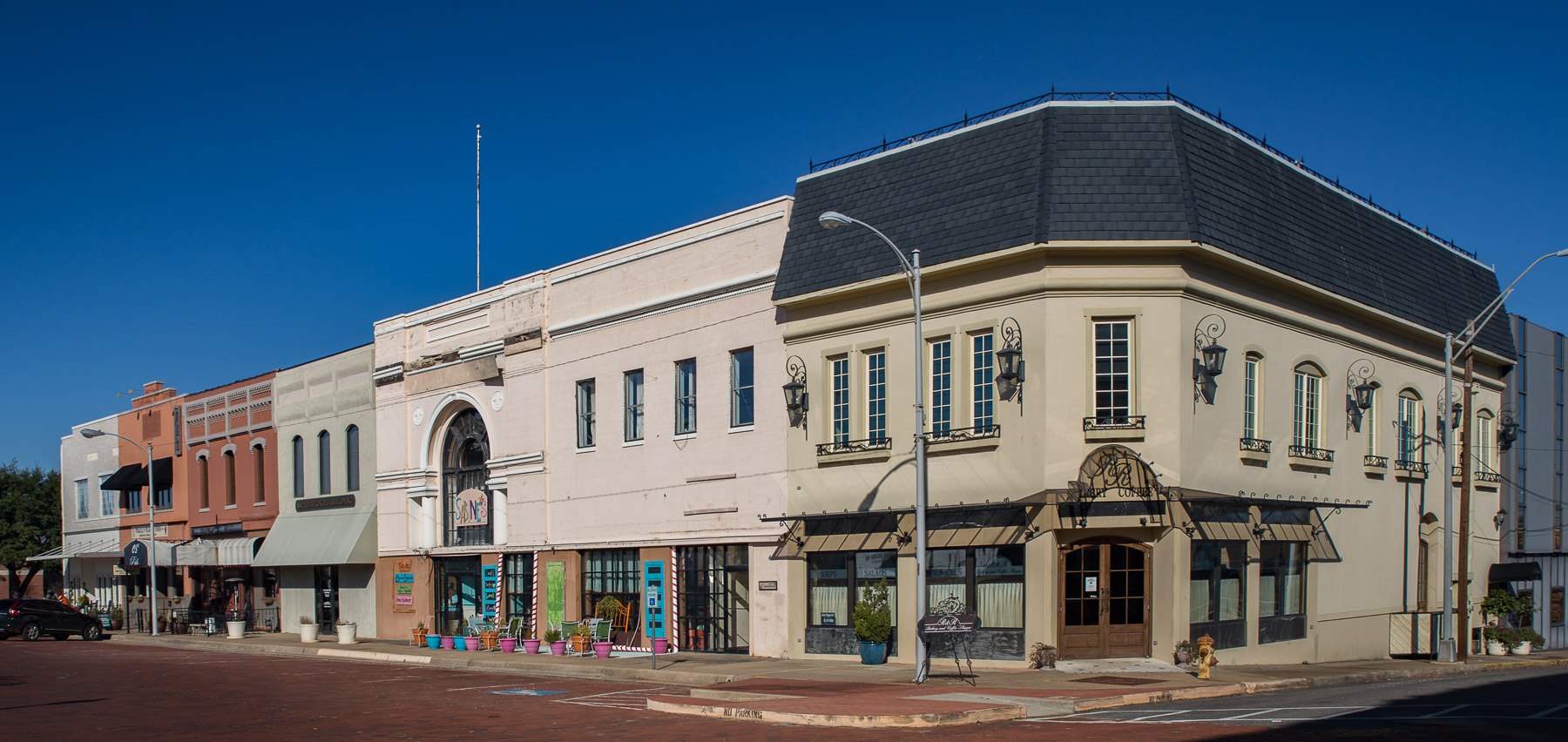
- From top, left to right: Plaza Tower in Tyler; North Broadway Avenue in Tyler; Downtown Longview; State Line Avenue in Texarkana; Paris Commercial Historic District; Downtown Palestine; Downtown Marshall; and Downtown Kilgore

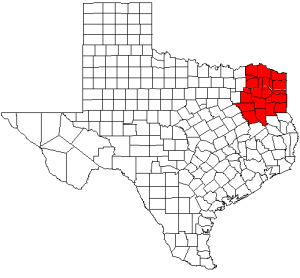
- Northeast Texas counties in red
- Country: United States
- State: Texas
- Largest city: Tyler

Population (2020)
  - Total: 1,152,223

Northeast Texas is a cultural and geographic region in the northeast corner of the U.S. state of Texas. Geographically centered on two metropolitan areas strung along Interstate 20—Tyler in the west and Kilgore, Longview, Marshall to the east, the areas of Greenville, Mount Pleasant, Sulphur Springs, Paris, and Texarkana in the north primarily along Interstate 30, and Jacksonville and Palestine to the south are also major cities within the region. Most of Northeast Texas is included in the interstate region of the Ark-La-Tex.

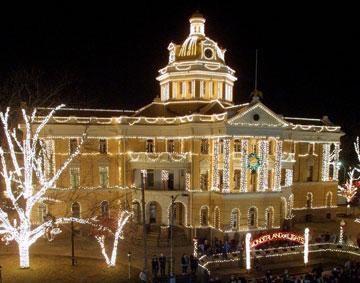
The Old Courthouse in Marshall during the Wonderland of Lights, the largest light festival in Northeast Texas: Tourism is one of Northeast Texas's most important industries.

The region is unique in that it is the only portion of East Texas that is not within the direct sphere of influence of either Dallas/Fort Worth or Houston. This generally weakens the area's visibility as areas in the far south ally themselves with Houston and areas to the west ally themselves with Dallas. These areas are on the fringe of those cities' spheres of influence, so are not as visible as smaller cities such as Grapevine or Deer Park, which are closer to the respective centers of power.

In the mid-19th century, Marshall and Jefferson constituted a sphere of influence that led the entire state into the Confederate States of America, and during the Mexican and Republic periods, Nacogdoches and San Augustine were the most developed and influential cities in Northeast Texas. Nacogdoches rebelled against Mexican rule in the Fredonian Rebellion and had one of the first newspapers to run the phrase Remember the Alamo!; while none of these three cities is a major population center in its own right on the state level any longer, all four are still major cultural centers, with Nacogdoches and Tyler being well-established centers of higher learning. Many of the largest cities in Northeast Texas still follow a rural Southern way of life, especially in dialect, mannerisms, religion, and cuisine.

== Geography ==
The geography of Northeast Texas is composed mainly of the Piney Woods, a mixed forest of deciduous and conifer flora. The Piney Woods cover 23,500 sq mi (61,000 km^{2}) of gently rolling or hilly forested land. These woods are part of a much larger region of pine-hardwood forest that extends into Louisiana, Arkansas, and Oklahoma. Northeast Texas lies within the Gulf Coastal Plain and receives more rainfall, 35 to 50 in (890 to 1270 mm), than the rest of Texas.

The Sabine River is the major river in Northeast Texas, and flows through Longview and several other cities. The Red River also flows through the region and forms the northern border with Oklahoma and a portion of Arkansas. In Northeast Texas and the rest of South, small rivers and creeks collect into swamps called "bayous" and merge with the surrounding forest. Bald cypress and Spanish moss are the dominant plants in bayous. The most famous of these bayous in Northeast Texas is the Cypress Bayou surrounding the Big, Little, and Black Cypress Rivers around Jefferson. They flow east into Caddo Lake and the adjoining wetlands cover the rim and islands of the lake.

Some of the major lakes in the area include: Jim Chapman Lake, Lake Tawakoni, Lake Fork, Cedar Creek Reservoir, Pat Mayse Lake, Lake Palestine, Caddo Lake, Lake O' the Pines, and Wright Patman Lake.

The climate of the region is warmer and wetter than most of Texas and its geography is more hilly and forested. Its culture is similar to that of Southeast Texas, but does not have as much of a Cajun influence.

=== Counties ===
According to Visit Northeast Texas, the following counties are considered to be part of Northeast Texas:

- Anderson
- Bowie
- Camp
- Cass
- Cherokee
- Delta
- Fannin
- Franklin
- Gregg
- Harrison
- Henderson
- Hopkins
- Hunt
- Lamar
- Marion
- Morris
- Panola
- Rains
- Red River
- Rusk
- Smith
- Titus
- Upshur
- Van Zandt
- Wood

=== Largest cities ===
City	Population (2020)
Tyler	105,995
Longview	81,638
Texarkana	36,193
Greenville	28,164
Paris	24,476
Marshall	23,392
Palestine	18,544
Mount Pleasant	16,047
Sulphur Springs	15,941
Jacksonville	13,997
Kilgore	13,376
Henderson	13,271
Athens	12,857

== Culture ==
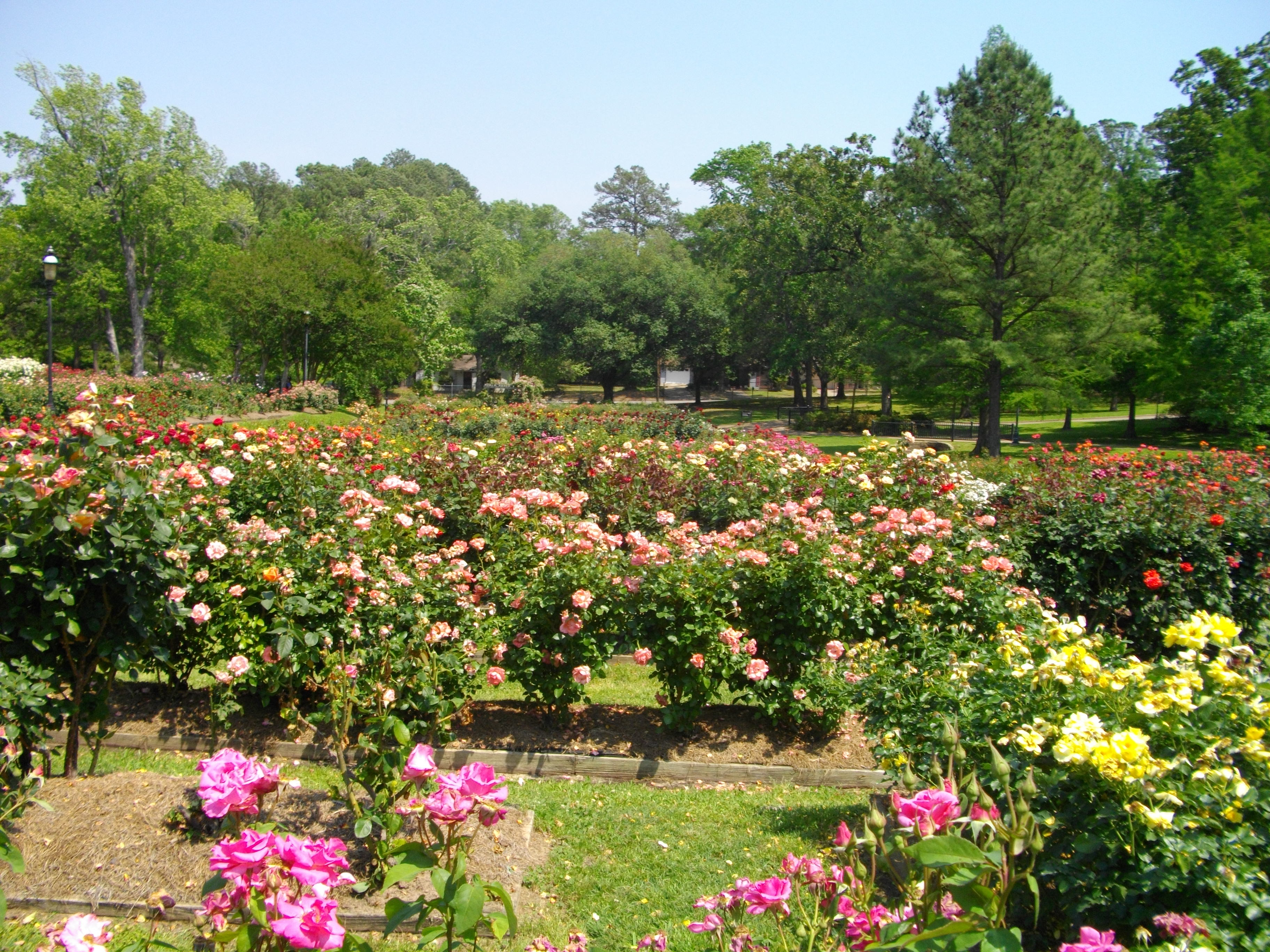
Rose garden in Tyler, Texas

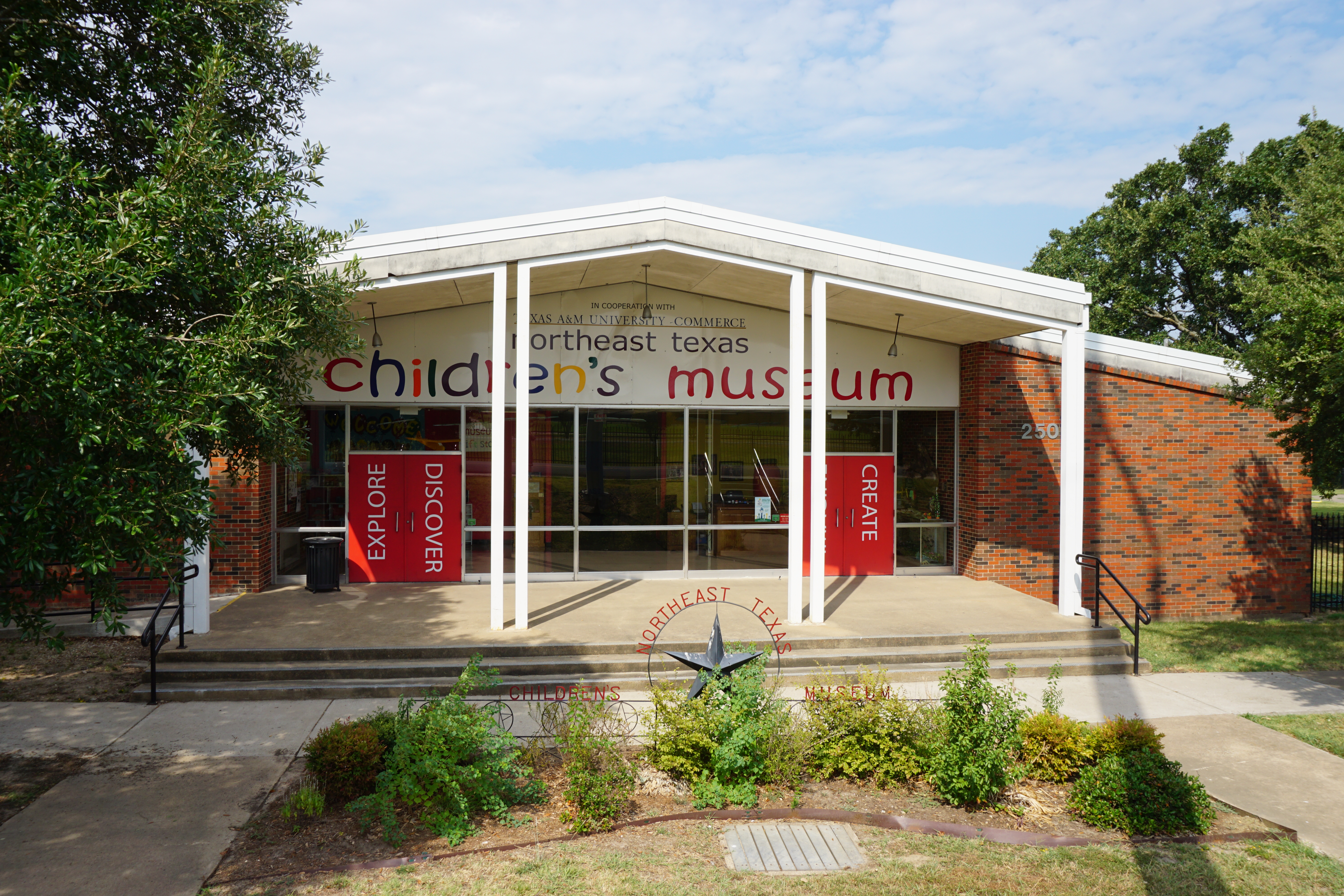
The Northeast Texas Children's Museum in Commerce

Culturally, Northeast Texas is more closely akin to Arkansas, Northern Louisiana, and even Mississippi than it is to West Texas. Northeast Texas is in the Bible Belt creating a strong Fundamentalist Christian sentiment. During the Civil Rights movement several communities clashed over integration. In presidential elections since 1950, both Smith County (county seat Tyler) and Gregg County (county seat Longview) have been reliably Republican.

Much of modern Northeast Texas culture has its roots in traditions that go back for generations. First Monday Trade Days is a monthly flea market held in Canton, Texas. The market is actually held on the Thursday through Sunday preceding the first Monday of each month. It purports to be the largest and oldest continually operated flea market in the United States, and is a popular event in the area.

The East Texas Oil Museum, located on the campus of Kilgore College in Kilgore, Texas, houses the authentic recreation of oil discovery and production in the early 1930s from the largest oil field inside U.S. boundaries.

Tyler has a rich culture and has been nicknamed the "Rose Capital of America" because of its large role in the rose-growing industry; about 20% of commercial rose bushes produced in the U.S. are grown in Tyler and Smith counties and more than half of the rose bushes are packaged and shipped from the area. It boasts the nation's largest municipal rose garden and hosts the Texas Rose Festival each October, which draws more than 100,000 spectators annually and has garnered nationwide attention.

The Northeast Texas Children's Museum is located in Commerce. The museum provides playful and creative learning experiences for children in the Northeast Texas area. Many school districts from the Dallas/Fort Worth Metroplex and the Northeast Texas area take field trips to the museum.

The Audie Murphy American Cotton Museum, located in Greenville, is dedicated to military veterans and showcases various exhibits and displays. Medal of Honor recipient Audie Murphy, born in Hunt County and worked in Greenville before entering the military, is honored at the museum. The museum also showcases cotton, as cotton was Hunt County's largest cash crop in the early 20th century, and the museum features a "History of Cotton" exhibit.

== Economy ==
The economy of Northeast Texas is primarily centered within the Tyler and Longview metropolitan statistical areas, the latter within the Ark-La-Tex region alongside the Texarkana metropolitan area. Within the Tyler and Longview conurbation, Brookshire Grocery Company operates as a multistate conglomerate owning Brookshire's and Super1Foods; other major corporations with a presence in the area include Synthesizers.com, Eastman Chemical, AAON Coil Products, AT&T, and Walmart.

== Higher education ==
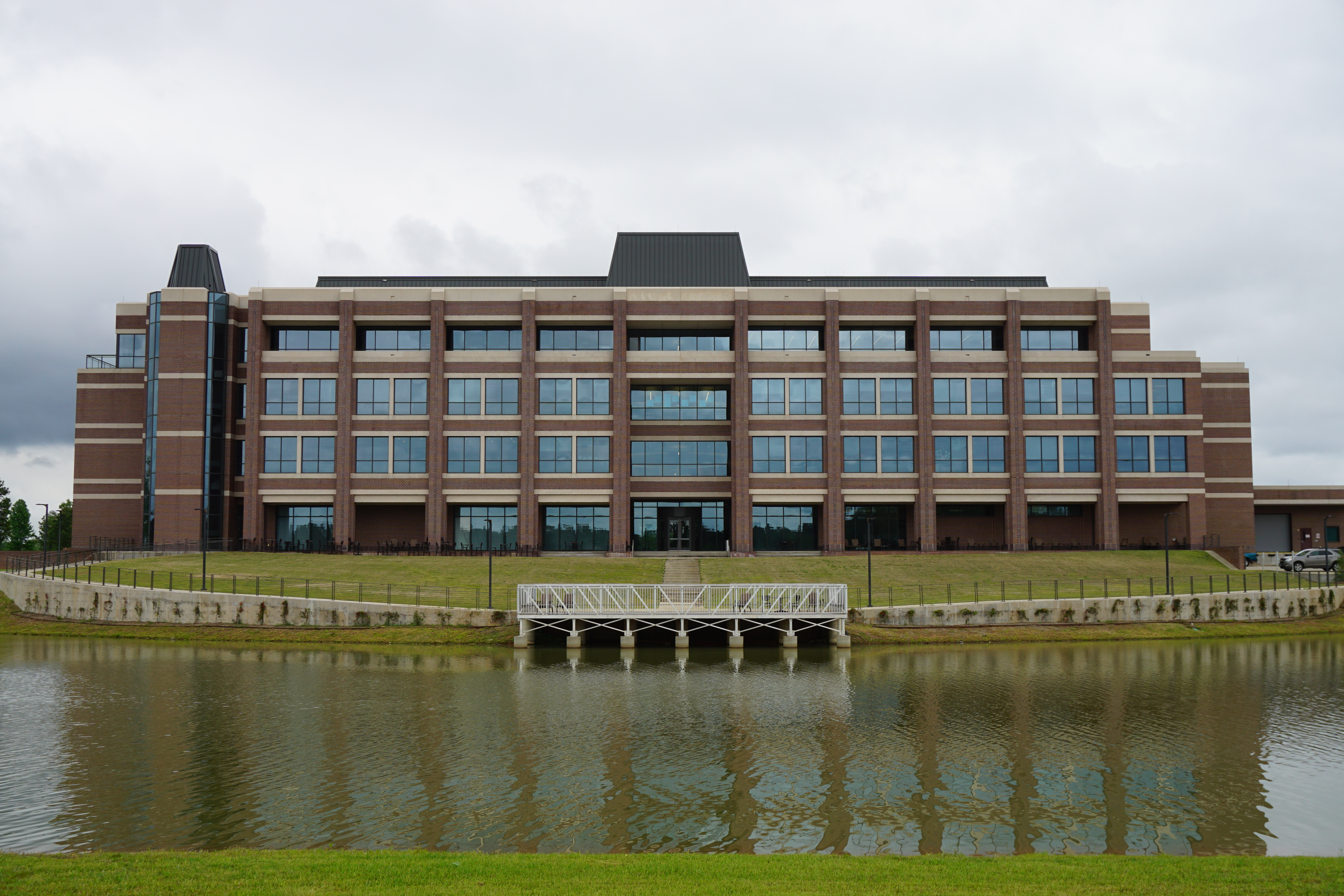
Texas A&M University–Texarkana

Northeast Texas has a number of higher-education institutions, including The University of Texas at Tyler, East Texas A&M University, Texas A&M University at Texarkana, Stephen F. Austin State University located in Nacogdoches, East Texas Baptist University, LeTourneau University, eight public and two private community colleges, a branch of the Texas State Technical College at Marshall, three historically black colleges, and a number of church-affiliated private institutions. The public colleges and universities of the region also collaboratively provide degree and course opportunities through the Northeast Texas Consortium of Colleges and Universities.

The community colleges of Northeast Texas share a history of emerging from the "junior college" movement of schools focused on providing the first two years of the college degree. Although most added technical programs with associate of applied science degrees following the community college movement of the 1960s, the schools still place a strong emphasis on liberal arts and the academic associate of arts and associate of science degree programs. They often include the full range of college sports, including football, and host dormitories, and are known for their "high kicking" drill teams. Community colleges in the region include Kilgore College, Paris Junior College, Northeast Texas Community College near Mt. Pleasant, Texarkana College, Panola College in Carthage, Tyler Junior College, Trinity Valley Community College in Athens and with campuses in Terrell and Palestine, and Angelina College in Lufkin. Jacksonville hosts the two smaller private two-year colleges of the region, Jacksonville College (Baptist) and Lon Morris College.

== Transportation ==
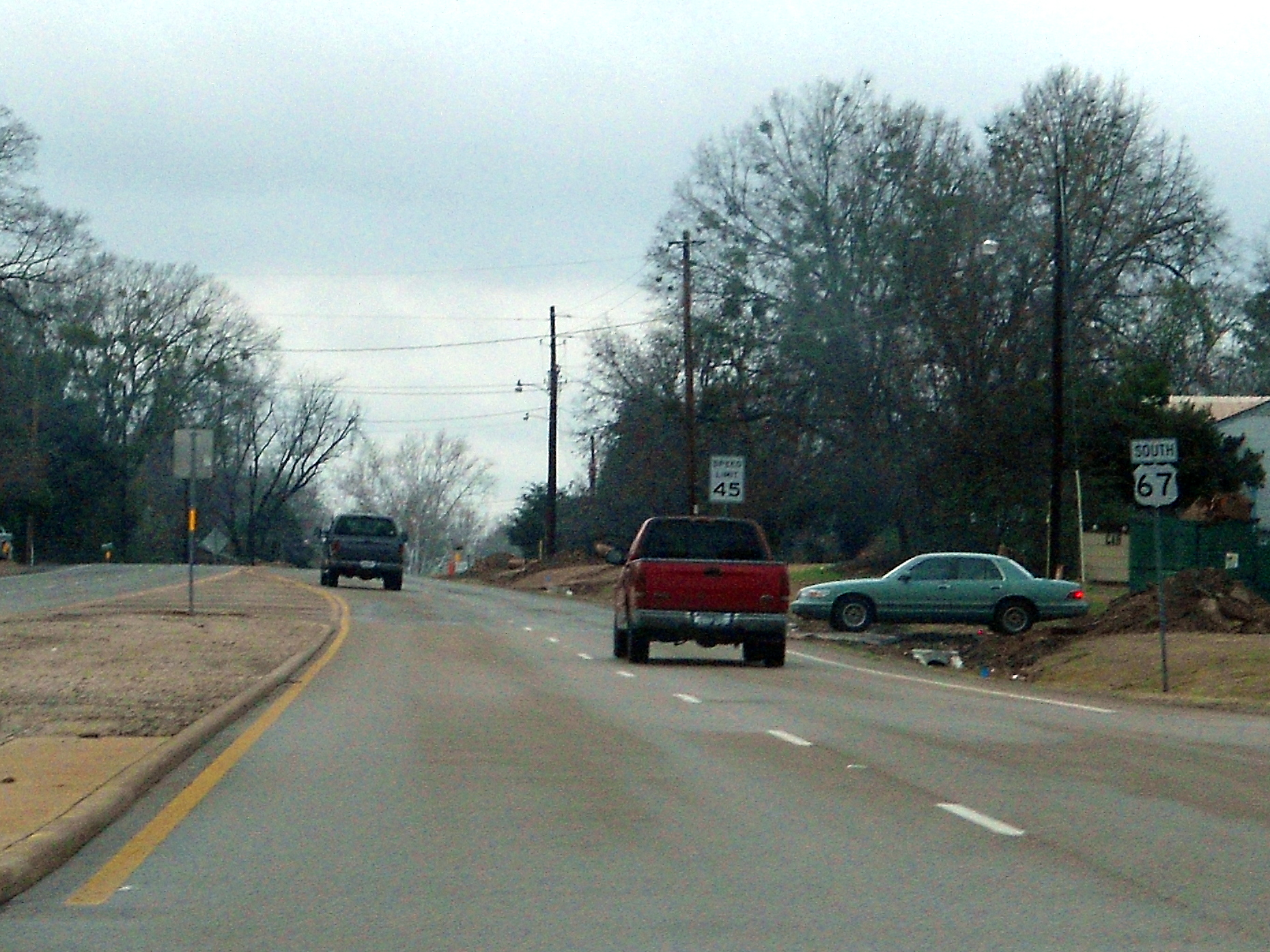
U.S. Highway 67 in Omaha

- Interstate 20
- Interstate 30
- Interstate 369
- U.S. Highway 59
- U.S. Highway 67
- U.S. Highway 69
- U.S. Highway 79
- U.S. Highway 80
- U.S. Highway 82
- U.S. Highway 84
- U.S. Highway 175
- U.S. Highway 259
- U.S. Highway 271
- U.S. Highway 287

== See also ==
- East Texas Council of Governments
- Ark-Tex Council of Governments
