= Daingerfield State Park =

State park in Texas, United States

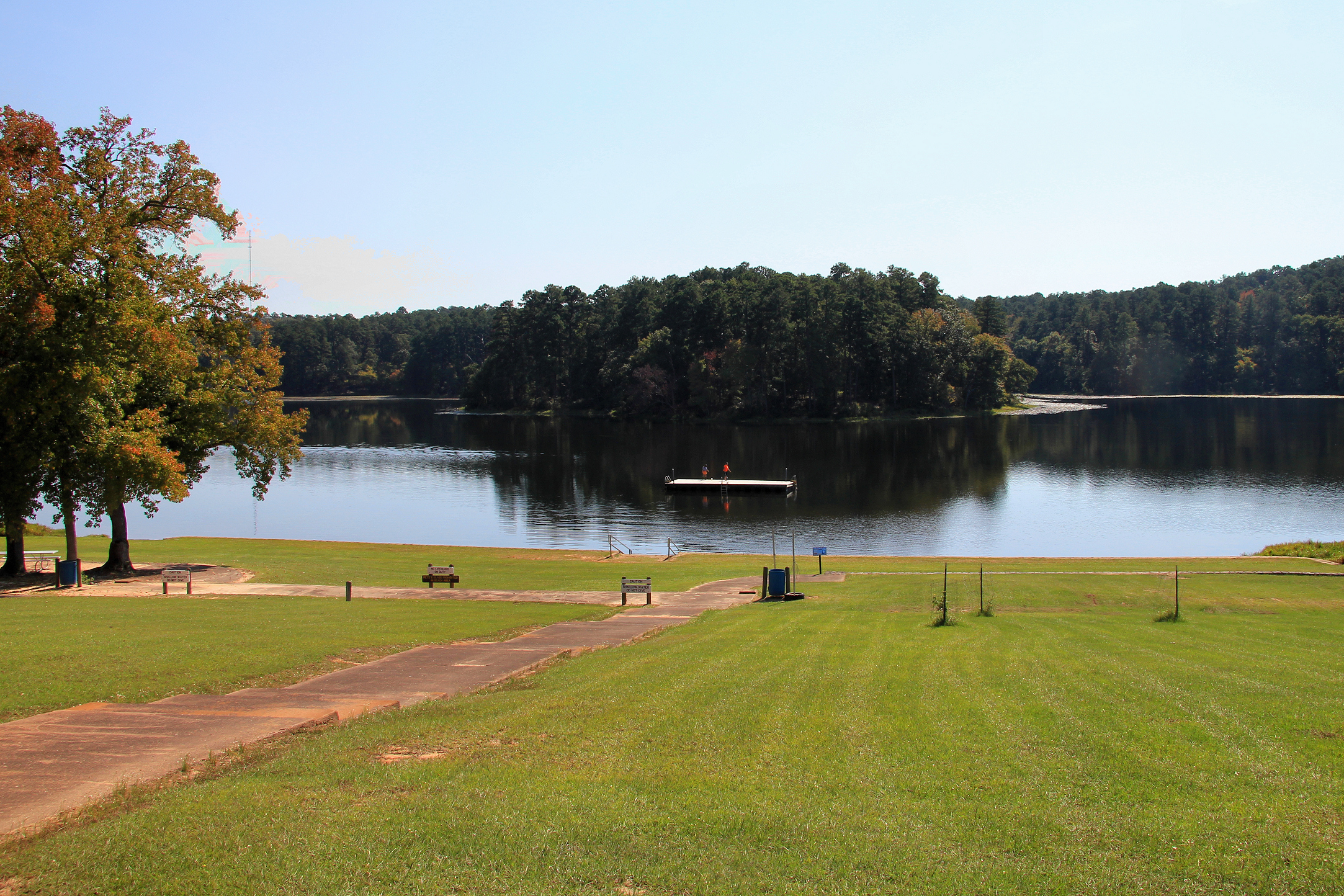
- Lake Daingerfield

- Location within Texas Location within the United States
- Location: Morris County, Texas
- Nearest city: Daingerfield
- Coordinates: 33°00′31″N 94°41′56″W
- Area: 507 acres (205 ha)
- Established: 1938
- Visitors: 84,187 (in 2025)
- Governing body: Texas Parks and Wildlife Department
- Website: Official site

Daingerfield State Park is a 506.913-acre (2.05140 km^{2}) state park in Morris County, Texas, southwest of Texarkana, including 80-acre (320,000 m^{2}) Lake Daingerfield. The park opened in 1938 and is managed by the Texas Parks and Wildlife Department.

== History ==
Private landowners deeded the property to the State of Texas in 1935 and planning for the park began. Company 2891 of the Civilian Conservation Corps (CCC) began work on the park in 1935 and built the dam and the lake. Company 1801 replaced Company 2891 in 1938 and completed the park, which opened the same year. The CCC also replanted the forest which was decimated by the early timber industry in the state.

The Texas Parks and Wildlife Department closed the park for a year in 2011 for a major remodel. Improvements included three new campground restrooms and an upgrade to full hookup campsites for the Big Pine, Dogwood and Mountain View camping areas.

== Nature ==
=== Animals ===
Daingerfield State Park is home to a variety of animals. Fish in the lake include largemouth bass, crappie, perch, channel and blue catfish, and chain pickerel. Rainbow trout are occasionally stocked. Mammals such as white-tailed deer, Mexican long-nosed armadillo, common raccoon, American beaver eastern gray squirrel and swamp rabbit are found in the park. Bird species include pileated woodpecker, yellow-bellied sapsucker red-shouldered hawk, barn swallows, purple martin, Canada geese and painted buntings. There are also many different reptile species such as the red-eared slider and green anole.

=== Plants ===
Daingerfield State Park is located in the piney Woods of East Texas with loblolly and shortleaf pine being the dominant species. Oak trees native to the park include southern red oak, white oak, cherrybark oak, post oak, blackjack oak willow oak, and water oak. American sweetgum, red maple, Chinese wisteria, Japanese honeysuckle, flowering dogwood and eastern redbud are also in the park. Little bluestem can be found in patches.

== Activities ==
The park offers picnicking; camping; boating (5 MPH speed limit); fishing; swimming in an unsupervised swimming area; hiking; and nature study. A seasonal concession (March–October) rents pedal boats and canoes. Tours may be arranged by special request. Year-round boat rentals are available.

== Facilities ==
Facilities include restrooms with and without showers; picnic sites including a group picnic area with tables (not covered); campsites with water; campsites with water and electricity; campsites with water, electricity, and sewer; a group lodge (Bass Lodge - capacity 20 persons: five bedrooms and two baths)(weekend reservation for Friday or Saturday requires reserving both nights); an overflow camping area; an amphitheater on the lake side; a launching ramp; a boat dock; a fishing pier; and a fish-cleaning facility; 2 1/2 miles of hiking trails; a playground with slides and swings; cabins with heating and air-conditioning, and kitchen facilities (linens and towels are furnished; but utensils, dishes, and silverware are not); Year-round boat rentals are available (also sell drinks, snacks, fishing supplies, and bait); and a Texas State Park Store is at the park.

== Area attractions ==
Nearby attractions are Lake Bob Sandlin State Park, Atlanta State Park, Caddo Lake State Park, Starr Family Home State Historic Site and the Morris County Museum. Area events include Wildflower Trails on the 3rd weekend in April, Jefferson Historical Pilgrimage and Mardi Gras Jefferson in February, and the Daingerfield Fall Fest in Daingerfield on the 2nd weekend in October.

== See also ==
- List of Texas state parks
