= East Texas Council of Governments =

- Logo

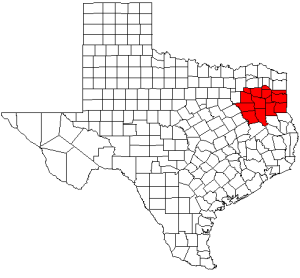
- Map of Texas highlighting counties served by the East Texas Council of Governments
- Formation: 1970
- Type: Voluntary association of governments
- Region served: 10,021 sq mi (25,950 km^{2})
- Members: 14 counties

Historical population
| Year | Pop. | ±% |
|---|---|---|
| 2000 | 745,180 | — |
| 2010 | 829,649 | +11.3% |
| 2020 | 871,375 | +5.0% |

The East Texas Council of Governments is a voluntary association of cities, counties and special districts in East Texas.

Based in Kilgore, the East Texas Council of Governments is a member of the Texas Association of Regional Councils.

== Counties served ==
- Anderson
- Camp
- Cherokee
- Gregg
- Harrison
- Henderson
- Marion
- Panola
- Rains
- Rusk
- Smith
- Upshur
- Van Zandt
- Wood

== Largest cities in the region ==
| City | 2000 Population | 2007-08 Revenue | 2007-08 Total Assets |
|---|---|---|---|
| Tyler | 83,650 | $87.7 million | $49.2 million |
| Longview | 73,344 | $75.9 million | $47.6 million |
| Marshall | 23,935 | not available | not available |
| Palestine | 17,985 | $12.6 million | $6.2 million |
| Jacksonville | 13,868 | $14.9 million | not available |
| Athens | 11,297 | $8.0 million | $4.2 million |
| Henderson | 11,273 | $10.3 million | not available |
| Kilgore | 11,301 | $15.7 million | not available |

== Other member agencies ==
- Cherokee County Soil and Water Conservation District
- Harrison County Soil and Water Conservation District
- Upshur-Gregg Soil and Water Conservation District
- Wood County Soil and Water Conservation District
- Upper Neches River Municipal Water Authority
- Sabine River Authority
- Trinity River Authority
- East Cedar Creek Fresh Water Supply District
- 9-1-1 Network of East Texas
- Trinity Valley Community College
- Kilgore College
- Tyler Junior College
- Trinity-Neces Soil and Water Conservation District
- Panola College
