= Ark-Tex Council of Governments =

- Logo

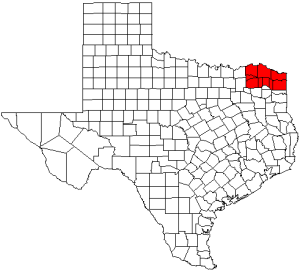
- Map of Texas highlighting counties served by the Ark-Tex Council of Governments
- Formation: December 1968
- Type: Voluntary association of governments
- Region served: 6,900 sq mi (18,000 km^{2})
- Members: 10 (9 in Texas, 1 in Arkansas) counties

Historical population
Year	Pop.	±%
2000	310,911	—
2010	321,409	+3.4%
2020	321,218	−0.1%

The Ark-Tex Council of Governments (ARK-TEX) is a voluntary association of cities, counties and special districts in Northeast Texas and Miller County, Arkansas.

Based in Texarkana, the Ark-Tex Council of Governments is a member of the Texas Association of Regional Councils.

== Counties served ==
- Bowie
- Cass
- Delta
- Franklin
- Hopkins
- Lamar
- Morris
- Red River
- Titus
- Miller County, Arkansas

== Largest cities in the region ==
- Texarkana, Texas
- Texarkana, Arkansas
- Paris
- Sulphur Springs
- Mount Pleasant
- Atlanta
