= South East Texas Regional Planning Commission =

- Logo

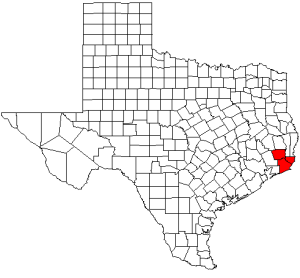
- Map of Texas highlighting counties served by the South East Texas Regional Planning Commission
- Formation: June 1970
- Type: Voluntary association of governments
- Headquarters: 2210 Eastex Freeway, Beaumont, TX 77703
- Coordinates: 30°05′56″N 94°08′5.8″W
- Region served: 2,196 sq mi (5,690 km^{2})
- Members: 4 counties
- Website: http://www.setrpc.org/

Historical population
Year	Pop.	±%
2000	385,090	—
2010	388,745	+0.9%
2012	392,697	+1.0%
2013	393,703	+0.3%

The South East Texas Regional Planning Commission (SETRPC) is a voluntary association of cities, counties and special districts in Southeast Texas. It provides support to its members in several areas including grant and budget administration, aging assistance, community development, disaster recovery, emergency communications, children at risk, Homeland Security initiatives, public safety liaison services, substance abuse prevention coordination, transportation, and environmental services.

Based in Beaumont, the South East Texas Regional Planning Commission is a member of the Texas Association of Regional Councils.

== Counties served ==
- Jefferson
- Orange
- Jasper

== Largest cities in the region ==
- Beaumont
- Port Arthur
- Orange
- Nederland
- Groves
- Port Neches
- Vidor
- Lumberton
