= Hurricane Debra (1959) =

Category 1 Atlantic hurricane in 1959

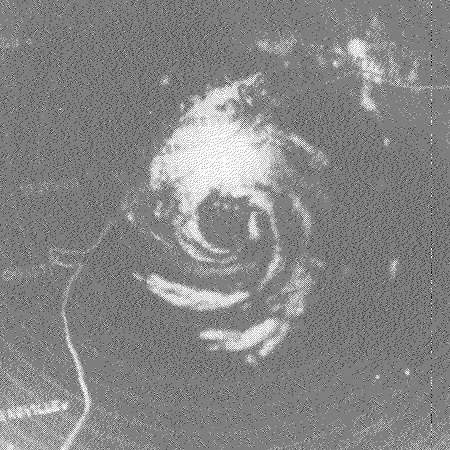
- Radar imagery of Debra shortly before landfall

Meteorological history
- Formed: July 23, 1959
- Dissipated: July 28, 1959

Category 1 hurricane
- 1-minute sustained (SSHWS/NWS)
- Highest winds: 85 mph (140 km/h)
- Lowest pressure: 980 mbar (hPa); 28.94 inHg

Overall effects
- Fatalities: None
- Damage: $7 million (1959 USD)
- Areas affected: Gulf Coast of the United States, South Central United States, Midwestern United States
- IBTrACS
- Part of the 1959 Atlantic hurricane season

Hurricane Debra was a destructive tropical cyclone that developed during the 1959 Atlantic hurricane season. The fifth tropical storm and third hurricane of the season, Debra originated from the interaction of a cold-core low and a tropical wave on July 15. The system was designated a tropical depression on July 23 when it was south of Louisiana and meandered westward while it swiftly intensified into a tropical storm along the Gulf Coast of the United States. A turn towards the northwest became evident as it attained Category 1 hurricane status on the Saffir–Simpson Hurricane Scale the following day while it organized into a developed storm. As the hurricane curved northward at a slow forward speed, strength was maintained as it approached the coast of Texas as a minimal hurricane. It came ashore during the evening of July 24 local time (0000 UTC on July 25) between Freeport and Galveston, Texas. It rapidly weakened into a tropical storm and later a depression as it moved inland, and dissipated on July 28 while it turned northwestward. The remnant moisture later sparked upper-level thunderstorms in late July and early August.

Prior to Debra's arrival in Texas, numerous hurricane warnings were issued and at least 8,600 individuals evacuated. Torrential rains were produced in southeastern Texas, which led to widespread flooding on highways. Sea vessels took the brunt of the storm, with many having become stranded or damaged. Forms of transportation such as air, rail, and road were significantly interrupted or even shut down. High winds from the storm caused expansive damage to buildings, windows, signs, and roofs. The hurricane resulted in 11 injuries but no deaths, and approximately 90 cattle drowned. Damage in Texas' Brazoria, Galveston, and Harris counties surmounted $6.685 million, (Note: All damage figures in the article are in 1959 United States dollars (USD) unless otherwise stated.) and total damage from the storm reached $7 million. In the aftermath, the Weather Bureau was criticized for the lack of warning; the bureau's chief, Stephen Lichtblau, maintained that it was fortunate that any warnings were issued, and those that were had been delivered in a timely manner.

== Meteorological history ==
Track of Hurricane Debra Map key Saffir–Simpson scale Tropical depression (≤38 mph, ≤62 km/h) Tropical storm (39–73 mph, 63–118 km/h) Category 1 (74–95 mph, 119–153 km/h) Category 2 (96–110 mph, 154–177 km/h) Category 3 (111–129 mph, 178–208 km/h) Category 4 (130–156 mph, 209–251 km/h) Category 5 (≥157 mph, ≥252 km/h) Unknown Storm type Tropical cyclone Subtropical cyclone Extratropical cyclone, remnant low, tropical disturbance, or monsoon depression

Debra's origins were from an area of convection over the western Bahamas and Florida related to an upper-tropospheric cold-core low and a tropical wave on July 15. Whilst under the influence of a subtropical ridge–or a belt of high pressure–it slowly meandered southwestward and arrived into the Gulf of Mexico on July 20. A weak surface circulation was observed near 1900 EST (0100 UTC on July 21) which was affected by an inverted trough as they turned westward. The system's circulation remained indistinct until July 23 as winds of 22–30 knots consorted with squalls adjacent to the coasts of Louisiana and Texas.

The storm attained tropical characteristics near 0000 UTC while situated south of Louisiana and was subsequently designated a tropical depression. Ship communications off the coast on July 24 relayed winds of 23–50 knots and a barometric pressure of 1007.5 mbar (29.75 inHg), which indicated it was a tropical storm on the Saffir–Simpson Hurricane Scale. Radar imagery taken near 0733 CST (1333 UTC) from a Dow Chemical plant in Freeport, Texas evidenced that Debra was a full-fledged Category 1 hurricane on the scale, with a prominent spiral appearance that was not perceived by the radar the previous afternoon.

As the result of a polar trough aloft in the central United States, Debra curved northward though its winds shifted southward, defying the earlier prediction of a bend west-northwest to northwest. A reconnaissance flight determined the location of its center during the mid-morning, and the hurricane made landfall near its peak intensity between Freeport and Galveston, Texas during the evening of July 24 local time (0000 UTC on July 25). It rapidly weakened on July 26 while it arched west-northwest, though it maintained tropical characteristics until its dissipation on July 28 over central Oklahoma while the system progressed north-northwestward. As it moved inland, moisture along its eastern fringe converged with a front to its northeast, causing heavy rains that were confined to limited areas in northeast Louisiana and southern Arkansas; they eventually traversed east-northeastward over northern Mississippi, Tennessee, and Kentucky. Moisture and instability from Debra led to high-level thunderstorms in Montana and northern Idaho on July 31 and August 1.

Hurricane Debra's development near the coast was unusual, complicating forecasting in addition to its rapid intensification and abnormal direction. The lack of ship reports and incorrect information received from those that were received further complicated Debra's forecasts. However, due to its formation close to the coast, Debra had inadequate time to cause a greater storm surge. Debra's floods accounted for most of the month's rainfall.

== Preparations ==
The Weather Bureau in New Orleans, Louisiana issued small craft warnings at 1230 UTC on July 24 stretching from Port O'Connor to High Island, Texas, while "whole gale warnings" were posted from Port O'Connor to Matagorda, Texas with regular gale warnings extending north to Freeport, Texas at 1500 UTC. A hurricane warning was later declared for areas between Matagorda to High Island at 2130 UTC, which was published at 2200 UTC. Warnings were widely distributed through radio services (including KGBC, KILE, KTLW, WBRZ, and KIOX), newspapers, bulletin boards, telegraph via the Western Union, regional teleprinters, the Chamber of Commerce's storm board, and storm warning displays. Several thousand citizens sought shelter at public facilities, including schools and courthouses. Approximately 1,000 inhabitants of Surfside Beach evacuated amid the threat of Debra. Between two and three thousand fled to Angleton, and another 1,000 fled to Freeport. An estimate said that at least 2,500 people left the Galveston Bay area; another 1,100 stayed in the Brazoria County Courthouse and 1,000 residents took shelter in public buildings in Galveston. Numerous others moved from resort towns into other areas.

== Impact ==
=== Texas ===
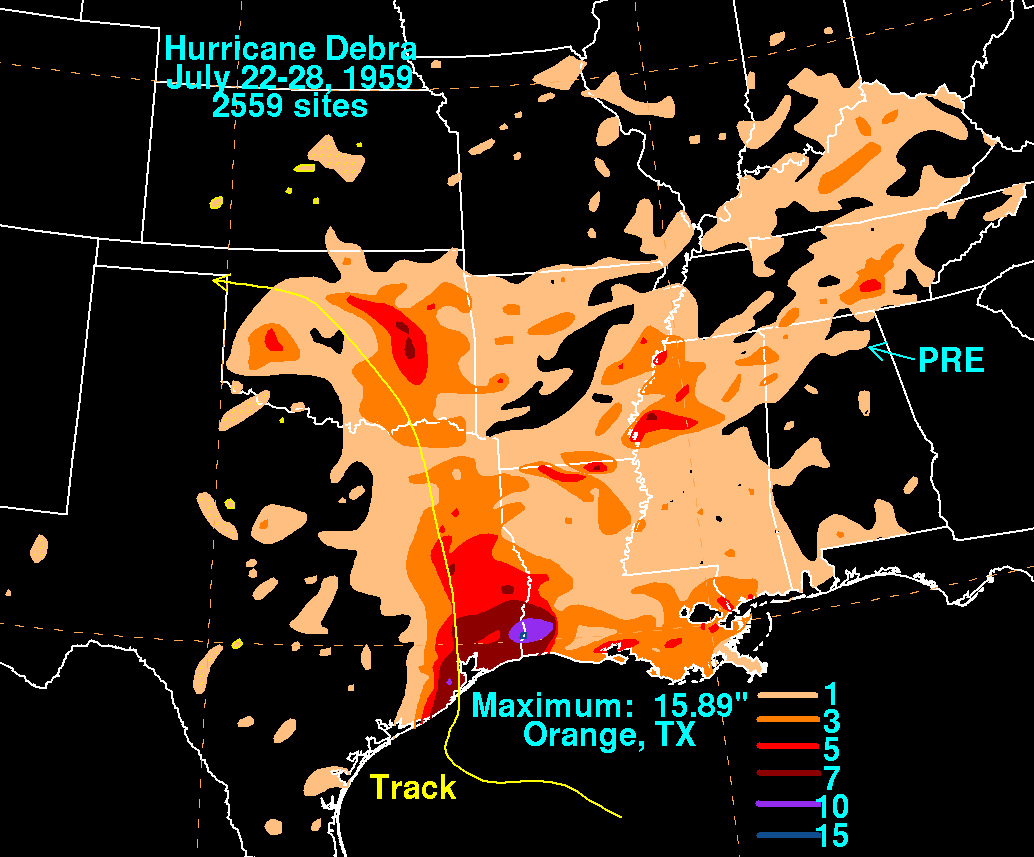
Rainfall produced by Hurricane Debra

The highest reported winds were estimated at 80–90 mph (130–140 km/h), with gusts up to 105 mph (169 km/h) at the Brazos River floodgates near Freeport. Tides were 3 to 5 feet (0.91 to 1.52 m) at Galveston Bay; Morgan Point measured the highest tides, at 7.9 feet (2.4 m) above normal. Overall, the storm surge was about 7 feet (2.1 m) high; near Harrisburg, Houston, its height was approximately 9.6 feet (2.9 m); around the Kemah-Seabrook area, the storm surge was 7 feet (2.1 m), while along the Dickinson Bayou they were 7 to 9 feet (2.1 to 2.7 m) above average. Alongside the Gulf Coast, especially in Texas, there were widespread measurements of heavy rainfall, which included a total of 15.89 inches (404 mm) at Orange, Texas, which led to the inundation low-lying streets; this total was the highest attributed to Debra. A daily rainfall record of 3.62 inches (92 mm) was achieved at Beaumont, and hurricane-force winds stretched 100 miles (160 km) inland.

The simultaneous occurrence of a storm surge and heavy rainfall wrought by Debra led to widespread flooding on highways, including that on Highway 75 northwest of Galveston on July 25 which caused the detachment of Galveston Island from the mainland for several hours. Other major roadways flooded were Highway 6 between Hitchcock and Galveston; Highway 146 from Kemah to Seabrook; and Farm to Market Road 518 extending from Kemah through League City. An unconfirmed report indicated that a funnel cloud briefly touched down roughly 40 miles (64 km) northwest of Brownsville/South Padre Island International Airport at approximately 0027 UTC, though no damage occurred.

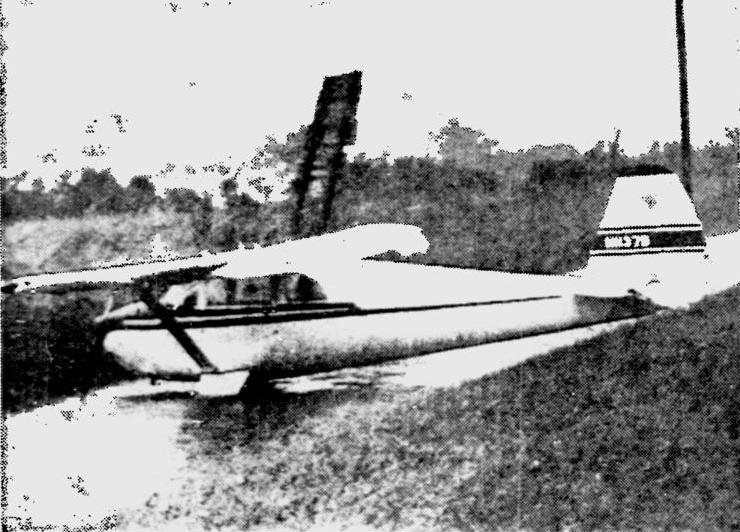
A plane thrown into a ditch by the hurricane

The majority of private piers situated upon the western and northern ends of Galveston Bay were destroyed as a result of Debra's storm surge. Damage primarily constituted to roofs, glass, sign boards, antennas, and certain sea vessels; abundant damage was caused by rising waters due to torrential rains. Approximately 90 cattle were killed on the western edge of Galveston Island. Furniture was thrown from the luxury Buccaneer Hotel into its swimming pool, shattering a large window. In Fort Worth, the entrance to the Tabernacle Baptist Church was completely destroyed, with its remnants littering the adjacent road. The largest quantity of damage to sea vessels was consolidated near the Kemah-Baytown area. Widespread damage from winds and tides was evident in the Hitchcock area, where three men were rescued after attempting to endure the hurricane at a fishing camp. In the Houston area, damage was limited to power lines and downed trees. At the former Houston International Airport, air transport was terminated, and water transportation was impeded as vast ships remained in ports. Onlookers were advised not to touch downed power lines, and electricity was knocked out at a hospital and roads were immersed in floodwaters. Most rail and road traffic in Houston was significantly interrupted.

One person went missing in Texas City, and several others were unaccounted for at other areas. There, damage to houses and other structures totaled several hundreds of thousands of dollars. Although 16 shops were damaged, no homes suffered any damage. Crop damage in Brazoria County also reached hundreds of thousands of dollars. A boat captain was hurt when his vessel crashed into a rock jetty under waves of 15 feet (4.6 m). A tower 75 feet (23 m) tall utilized for the purpose of hoisting storm warning flags in Freeport was demolished, and damage within the city involved broken windows and roof shingles, in addition to the power outages that occurred. Automobiles were blown onto the city's roads, and Second Street, the city's primary street, was below 3.5 feet (1.1 m) of floodwaters; the costs of the overall effects from Debra in Freeport were estimated at $300,000, although then-mayor Jim Russell claimed that damage could reach $1.5 million. Damage at La Marque (then known as Lamarque) totaled to as much as $1 million. Reports asserted that one person was engulfed and died offshore the Freeport area, but they were unconfirmed; another individual and their daughter previously listed as missing in the city were discovered at Houston. Several other individuals were reported as missing, including four on a vessel offshore Freeport and one in Texas City. Another two were unaccounted for in Green Lake. A night club at Clute burst into flames during the hurricane and winds created the possibility of the blaze spreading, although it was dealt with after several firemen came to the location. Debra destroyed approximately 1,000 piers of a small size at La Porte.

A shrimp boat and two other watercraft were known to be in difficult situations, while another sent out a distress call claiming that the boat's fuel tank had dismantled from it and its crew was anticipating an explosion. A Coast Guard aircraft searched for the shrimping boat Rosina after it had begun to dismantle while a Coast Guard buoy identified as the Blackthorn probed for the Cain Hoy, although the three on board the Rosina were later recovered. All vessels reported as missing were recovered by the Coast Guard on July 25. A ship known as Hope with a crew of three was thrown ashore 35 miles (56 km) southeast of Freeport, but the United States Coast Guard was incapable of rescuing the craft and its shipmembers. Tornadoes touched down near the then-Jefferson County Airport, Sebastian, and Kenedy, with the first associated with the precursor to Debra.

In all, damage in Brazoria, Galveston, and the eastern part of Harris counties totaled $6.7 million, while damage elsewhere increased the total to $7 million. 10 people suffered minor injuries in Brazoria County, in addition to one off the coast.

=== Elsewhere ===
In Oklahoma, torrential rainfall produced floods in small areas of the state, especially the southeast, east-, north-, and north-central portions of the state. Two tornadoes touched down in Kiowa and Caddo counties, with the prior tracking 20 miles (32 km), resulting in minimal damage. In Stillwater, three consecutive hours of torrential rains led to an inundation of 8 inches (200 mm) as observed by the Oklahoma Highway Patrol. Heavy rainfall also occurred in Louisiana, Mississippi, Arkansas, Alabama, Missouri, Illinois, Indiana, Kentucky, and Ohio. Debra sparked high-level thunderstorms in Montana and northern Idaho, eventually leading to wildfires.

== Aftermath ==
An editorial published in the Houston Chronicle criticized the lack of warnings prior to Hurricane Debra's arrival in Texas, alleging that with radar, aircraft, and communication systems, the Weather Bureau should have been able to give a warning well in advance of the storm. The article remarked that the Bureau "seemed almost as uninformed as the ordinary citizen" in regards to the forecasting. The chief of the Weather Bureau, Stephen Lichtblau, fired back, saying that "we were fortunate to get a warning." He continued "had [the Weather Bureau] not had...[such] equipment they are complaining about, we could have [released] nothing," and maintained that warnings were issued promptly. When repairs in Calhoun County, Texas were completed in 1961, Hurricane Carla struck shortly thereafter in September.

== See also ==
- List of Texas hurricanes (1950–79)
- List of United States hurricanes
- Other storms with the same name
