= KKHA =

- Markham, Texas; United States
- Broadcast area: Bay City, Texas; El Campo, Texas; Danevang, Texas; Palacios, Texas; Matagorda, Texas; Wadsworth, Texas
- Frequency: 92.5 MHz
- Branding: Happy Radio 92.5

Programming
- Format: Classic hits

Ownership
- Owner: David Rowell; (Bay and Beyond Broadcasting LLC)
- Sister stations: KIOX, KBBB

History
- First air date: 2000
- Former call signs: KGFJ (1997–1999; CP); KZRC (1999–2008)
- Call sign meaning: Happy

Technical information
- Licensing authority: FCC
- Facility ID: 87439
- Class: C3
- ERP: 18,000 watts
- HAAT: 100 meters (330 ft)
- Transmitter coordinates: 28°52′25″N 96°08′22″W

Links
- Public license information: Public file; LMS
- Website: kkha925.com

KKHA (92.5 FM) is a radio station licensed to Markham, Texas. The station broadcasts a classic hits format and is owned by David Rowell, through licensee Bay and Beyond Broadcasting LLC.

== History ==
Michael Augustus requested and was issued a construction permit to build a Class A facility on 92.5 MHz @ 3.6 kilowatts, with 130 meters elevation, on December 15, 1997. The facility was licensed to Markham, with a tower site located 1 mile north of Elmaton, Texas. Originally given the call sign KGFJ under the construction permit, the KGFJ license was then transferred to LBR Enterprises, Inc. on July 12, 1999, with the call being changed to KZRC on October 21, 1999. The facility was constructed and received a License to Cover on December 11, 2000. KZRC featured a rock format under the branding of "92.5 The Cat".

KZRC changed call sign to KKHA on August 29, 2008, becoming "Happy Radio 92.5" and re-formatted to the current classic hits.

On June 24, 2014, KKHA was granted an upgrade to Class C3, with a power increase to 18 kilowatts from a height of 100 meters elevation. The transmission site was also moved to a parcel of land off of Farm to Market Road 1095, approximately 2 miles south of Elmaton, which is the current specifications and tower site for the facility.

An application was filed with the FCC dated July 9, 2015, which requested the transfer of KKHA's license from Edwards Broadcasting to Tomlinson-Leis Broadcasting resulting from the sale of the facility for $257,860. The sale to Tomlinson-Leis Broadcasting was consummated on December 29, 2015.

On July 3, 2018, Tomlinson-Leis filed to sell the facility to GlobeCom Media LLC, owner of 96.1 KIOX. The sale was consummated on October 30, 2018, at a purchase price of $150,000. In June 2022 the station was purchased, together with Globecom's other station KIOX, by Bay and Beyond Broadcasting LLC.

The station moved from premises on the city square in Bay City to Globecom's El Campo studios with that purchase in 2018. In 2022, with the change of ownership to Bay and Beyond Broadcasting, it now operates from facilities in both cities, shared with Bay and Beyond's other two stations (KIOX and KBBB) - 107 E Monseratte St, El Campo TX 77437 and 3000 Wyatt Ave, Bay City TX 77414.
