= List of Texas hurricanes (1950–1979) =

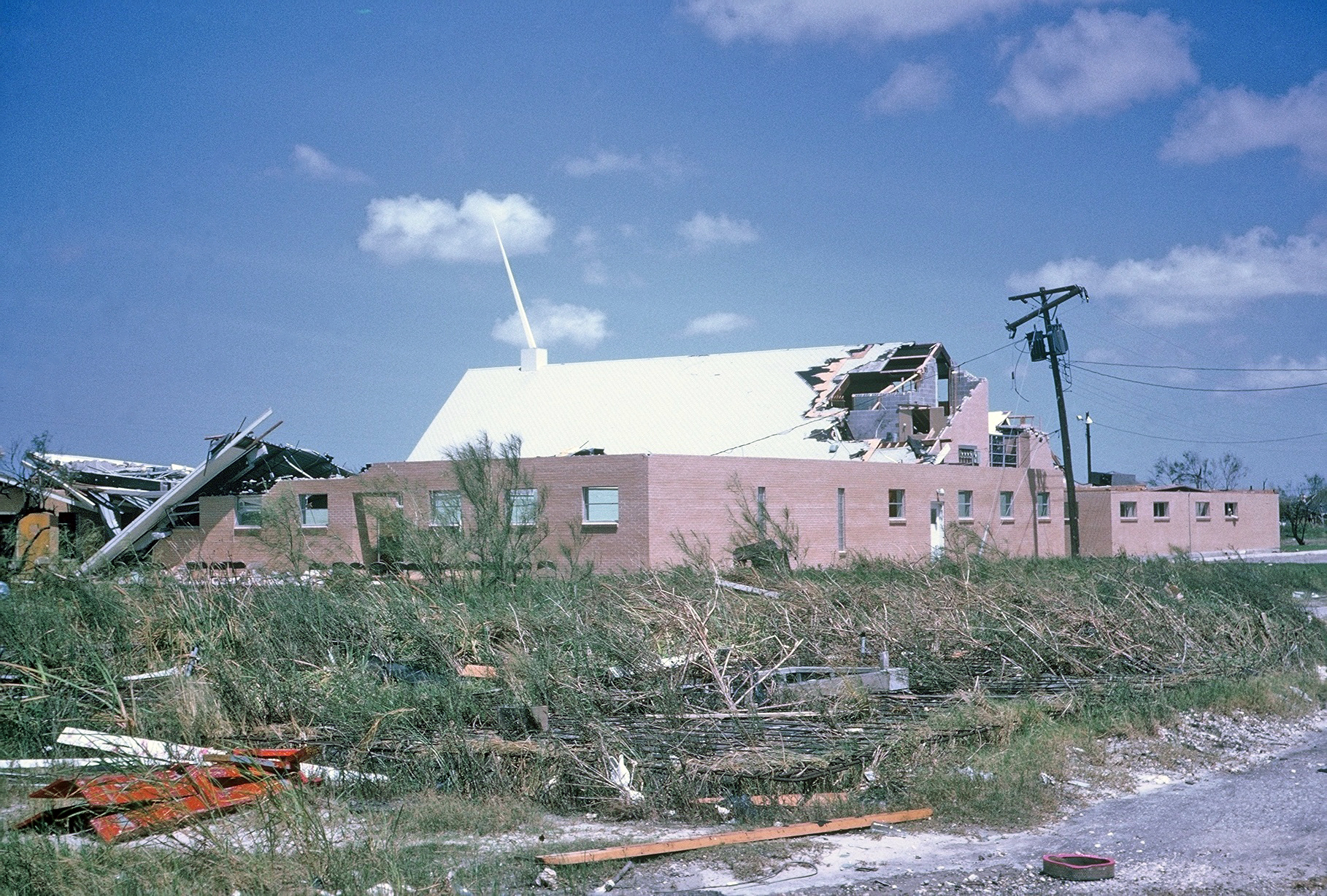
Structural damage caused by Hurricane Celia

From 1950 to 1979, at least 34 tropical or subtropical cyclones affected the U.S. state of Texas. According to David Roth of the Hydrometeorological Prediction Center, a tropical cyclone makes landfall along the coastline about three times every four years. On any 50 mi (80 km) segment of the coastline, a hurricane makes landfall about once every six years.

During this period, the most active month for storms affecting Texas is September, with twelve total storms, while no recorded storms have affected Texas during the months of November through May. The most intense storm in terms of both barometric pressure and maximum sustained winds was Hurricane Carla in 1961, which also caused the most fatalities, with 46 deaths. (Note: All damage totals are in the value of the USD during the storm's year of existence.) The first storm to impact the state during the period was Tropical Storm How in October 1950, with the latest being Tropical Depression Twenty in September 1979.

In the 1950s, five tropical cyclones made landfall on Texas as hurricanes. Starting in 1955, hurricanes that caused substantial damage to any country could have their name retired from the list of names for the Atlantic basin. Hurricane Audrey, the most destructive Texas hurricane during the 1950s, was the first hurricane to impact Texas to have its name retired. While the 1960s only featured six tropical cyclones making landfall on Texas, Hurricane Carla and Hurricane Beulah made landfall as major hurricanes during the decade. Both hurricanes were subsequently retired. In the 1970s, five hurricanes affected Texas. Hurricane Celia made landfall as a major hurricane in 1970, causing $930 million in damages making it the costliest storm to occur during this time period.

== 1950–1954 ==
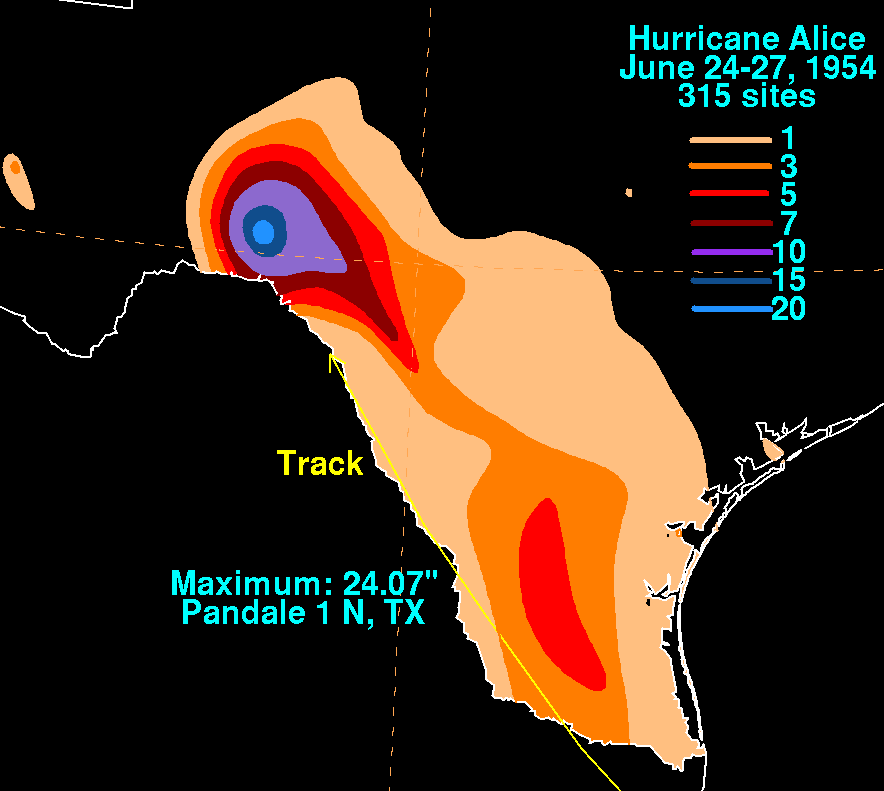
Rainfall totals of Hurricane Alice

- October 4, 1950 – Tropical Storm How hits the Mexican coast 150 miles (240 km) south of Brownsville. Damage is reported as far north as Port Aransas. Tides rise to 4 feet (1,200 mm) at Padre Island. Sections of highway on North Padre Island are washed away.
- June 25, 1954 – The first Hurricane Alice of 1954 makes landfall south of Brownsville as a hurricane. Damage on the coast close to where Alice made landfall remained minimal. However, the resulting flood caused by the remnants of Alice were considered a 1 in 2000 year event. The storm caused high rainfall totals, peaking at 24 inches (610 mm) northwest of Del Rio. A bridge on the Pecos River collapsed due to the heavy rains. In the town of Ozona alone, the floods caused $2 million in damages.
- July 29, 1954 – Tropical Storm Barbara makes landfall on Vermilion Bay before moving into Texas as a tropical depression, bringing rain and gusty winds.
- October 3, 1954 – An unnumbered tropical depression makes landfall in the Brownsville area, bringing rough seas. The storm causes 6.09 inches (155 mm) of rain in Brownsville. Notably, on October 5, when the system was centered over the Big Bend region, a rocket launched by the United States Navy in White Sands, New Mexico, took an unintended photograph of the depression from an altitude of about 100 miles (160 km), which became the first such large-scale image of a tropical cyclone.

== 1955–1959 ==
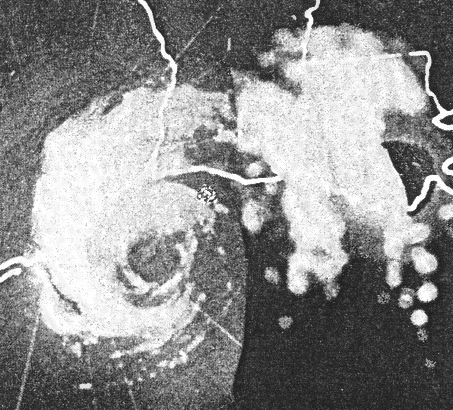
Radar image of Hurricane Audrey

- August 2, 1955 – Tropical Storm Brenda makes landfall near New Orleans, Louisiana and moves westward into eastern portions of Texas in early August. Prior to the storm, storm warnings are issued for the entire Gulf Coast from Galveston to the Mississippi River. Small craft advisories are issued for coastal areas extending down to Brownsville.
- September 6, 1955 – Hurricane Gladys makes landfall 140 mi (230 km) south of Brownsville as a Category 1 hurricane with winds of 85 mph (137 km/h). Vacationers evacuate Padre Island in preparation for the storm. Rainfall peaks at 17.02 in (43.2 cm) in Flour Bluff. In Oso Bay, storm surge is reported to have reached 4.5 ft (1.4 m) in height. Two ships off the Texas coast are feared to have been damaged during the storm. The shrimp boat Mary Ellen was thought to have been beached on Padre Island, and the Don II went missing off Port Aransas. The United States Coast Guard patrols the coast to rescue stranded people and respond to emergency calls, as well as search for the missing ships. A secondary low-pressure area formed on September 7 near Gladys. The circulation area was known as Glasscock, after an offshore oil platform that reported 83 mph (134 km/h) winds during the storm. It was later speculated that the system was a separate tropical storm. Gladys causes $400,000 in damages across South Texas.
- June 13, 1956 – An unnamed tropical storm makes landfall in southeastern Louisiana, resulting in heavy rains in eastern Texas. Rainfall peaks at 3.34 in (8.5 cm) in Huntsville.
- June 27, 1957 – Hurricane Audrey makes landfall near Sabine Pass, as a Category 3 hurricane with maximum sustained wind speeds of 125 mph (200 km/h) and a minimum pressure of 946 mbar (27.9 inHg). While most of the storm's impact occurs in Louisiana, Audrey still brings strong winds to far eastern Texas. Port Arthur records a gust of 85 mph (137 km/h) due to the hurricane. Winds also knock down power lines and communication lines. Many trees are also uprooted due to the strong winds. Rainfall from Audrey peaks at 7.57 in (19.2 cm) in Port Arthur. Heavy rains also set a daily rainfall record at Jefferson County Airport, recording 7.35 in (18.7 cm) in a 24-hour period. Hurricane Audrey also brings a storm surge of 6 ft (1.8 m) across the coast, resulting in tides 4 ft (1.2 m) above average in Corpus Christi. The strong waves wash out areas of Mustang Island and Packery Channel. Multiple ships, including a tanker, become beached off of Corpus Christi as a result of the wave action associated with the hurricane. Nine deaths in Texas result from Audrey, seven of which are attributed to the sinking of a fishing boat offshore of Galveston. Damages from Hurricane Audrey in Texas amount to $8 million.
- August 10, 1957 – Tropical Storm Bertha makes landfall near the Texas–Louisiana border as a strong tropical storm with winds of 70 mph (110 km/h). Tides reach 4.7 ft (1.4 m) above normal in Vermillion Bay. As it moves into Texas, Bertha drops heavy rain, especially in the Piney Woods, where rain peaks at 10.87 in (276 mm) of rain in Long Lake. In Livingston, the rains are considered the worst since 1929. Two highways near the city are closed due to high water, and the town suffers from subsequent water damage. In other areas of East Texas, cotton and sorghum crops benefit from the rain.
- June 15, 1958 – Tropical Storm Alma makes landfall on northeastern Mexico 70 mi (110 km) south of Brownsville, Texas. At South Padre Island tides reach 2.9 ft (0.88 m). Rainfall peaks in McNeely Ranch in South Texas at 9.50 in (241 mm). Much of the damage from Alma is due to heavy rains, which cause substantial crop and structural damage. One person drowns off Galveston due to Alma.
- September 6, 1958 – Hurricane Ella makes landfall in southern Texas near Corpus Christi with winds of 45 mph (72 km/h). In preparation for the storm 117 aircraft at Moore Air Base are moved to the James Connally Air Force Base. In addition the aircraft carrier USS Antietam is evacuated out of Corpus Christi. Just before the storm, three small communities, including Port Aransas, are evacuated. As Ella makes landfall, tides were reported to be at least 3 ft (0.91 m) above mean sea level. Texas State Highway 44 is rendered nearly impassable due to the rains. Rainfall peaks at 13.06 in (332 mm) in Scholes International Airport. Only one death occurs due to Ella offshore.
- July 24, 1959 – Hurricane Debra makes landfall between Galveston and Freeport with winds of 85 miles per hour (137 km/h) and a minimum pressure of 984 mbar (29.1 inHg). Rainfall peaks at 15.89 in (40.4 cm) in Orange. No deaths are reported, but a person reportedly goes missing in Texas City. The shrimp boat Hope, with a crew of three, is beached on a sand bar, but the coast guard was unable to reach the ship and its occupants. Tides peak at 7.9 ft (2.4 m) above normal in Morgan Point. A daily rainfall record is set by Debra in Beaumont, where 3.62 in (9.2 cm) of rain was reported in a day. In Texas City, residences and buildings are damaged by the storm. In Brazoria County, crop damage totals to at least $100,000 in the county alone. Damages from Debra are estimated to have reached $6.7 million.

== 1960–1964 ==
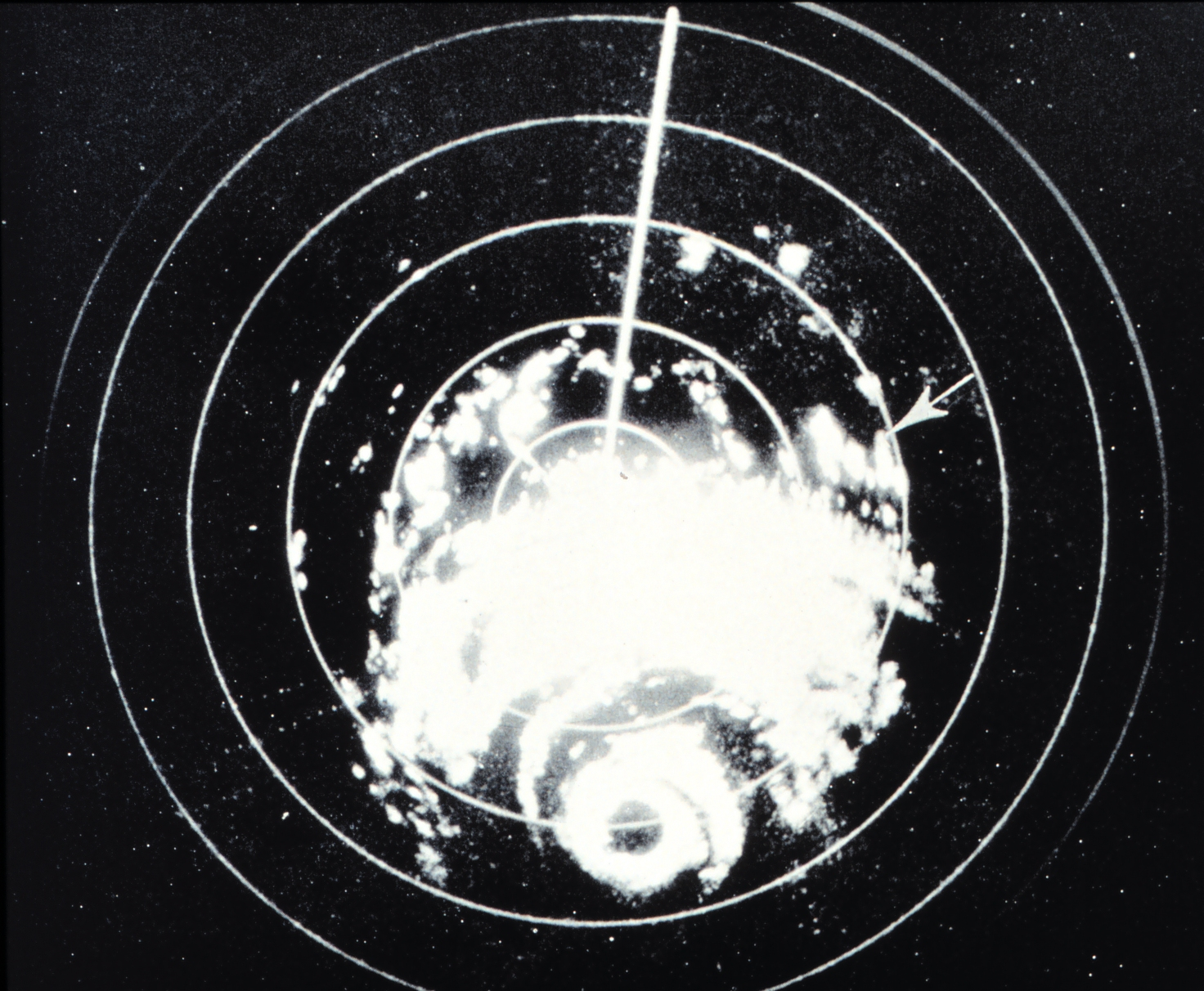
Radar image of Hurricane Carla

- June 23, 1960 – Tropical Storm One of 1960 hit 30 miles (48 km) south of Corpus Christi, Texas as a 45 mph (72 km/h) storm. The storm looped over southern Texas, dumping heavy rain over the area. It moved slowly northward, and eventually dissipated over Illinois. Though weak, the storm caused $3.6 million in damage (1960 dollars) and 15 deaths.
- September 11, 1961 – Hurricane Carla made landfall near Port Lavaca as a Category 4 hurricane. With an estimated central pressure of 931 mb at landfall, Carla was one of the largest and most intense hurricanes to strike the United States, and the strongest ever to hit Texas. Gusts as high as 170 mph (270 km/h) were estimated at Port Lavaca. Carla killed 31 people in Texas. The low death toll is credited to what was then the largest peacetime evacuation in United States history up until that time. One half million residents headed inland from exposed coastal areas. Carla caused a total of $325 million in damage.
- September 17, 1963 – Tropical Storm Cindy in 1963 made landfall on High Island, Texas. Cindy brought heavy rain to southeast Texas as it drifted southwestward over the state. The hurricane dissipated after causing $12.5 million in damage and three deaths.
- August 7, 1964 – Tropical Storm Abby the very next year hit Matagorda, Texas as a 65 mph (105 km/h) tropical storm, dissipating the following day. Abby was a small system; its complete circulation at the surface was less than 100 miles (160 km) in diameter. Because of this, Abby caused only $750,000 in damage, most of it from crop damage.

== 1965–1969 ==
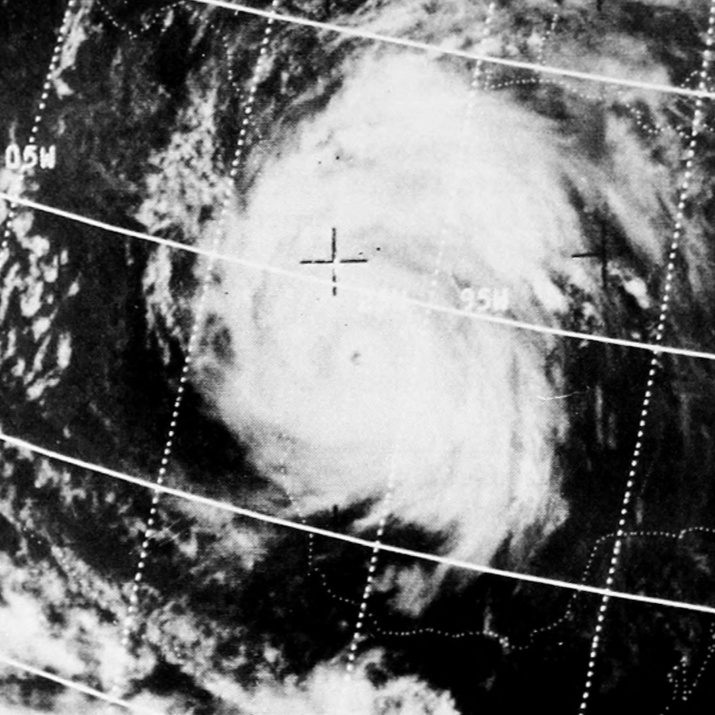
Satellite image of Hurricane Beulah

- September 20, 1967 – In 1967, Hurricane Beulah made landfall in Mexico near the mouth of the Rio Grande and moved into Texas as a Category 3 storm. The highest reported winds were 136 MPH, recorded in South Padre Island, about 20 miles (32 km) north of Port Isabel. The lower Rio Grande Valley, the four county region that comprises deep south Texas, was inundated with torrential rains and strong winds. Gusts of over 100 MPH were recorded as far inland as the towns of McAllen, Edinburg, Mission, and Pharr, some fifty miles from the gulf coast. Beulah was a record tornado-producer (a record that would stand until 2004) that destroyed homes, commercial property, and inflicted serious damage on the region's agricultural industry. The Rio Grande Valley's citrus industry, based on cultivation of the famous "Ruby Red" grapefruit, was particularly hard hit. Padre Island, just off the Texas gulf coast, suffered significant devastation, and the island's sensitive ecosystem was altered by the storm. Within a 36-hour period it dropped almost 30 inches of rain in Beeville, Texas. Hurricane Beulah caused an estimated $1.1 billion (in 2000 dollars) in damage. Sources report 58–59 deaths from the storm.
- July 23, 1968 – In 1968, Tropical Storm Candy moved inland over southeast Texas, causing heavy flooding, crop damage, and tornadoes.

== 1970–1974 ==
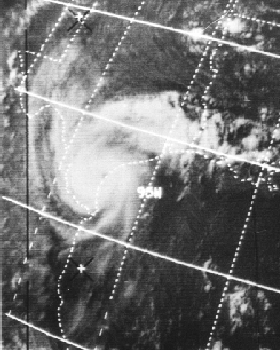
Satellite image of Hurricane Celia

- August 3, 1970 – Hurricane Celia of 1970 made landfall as a category 4 in Texas near Port Aransas. Celia killed 20 due to extreme gusts, and caused hundreds of millions of dollars in damage. The storm produced microbursts, which are rare in a tropical cyclone. The windbursts caused heavy damage across the city. In Corpus Christi, Texas, one person was reported dead with over 460 others injured. Total damage was about $930 million. In Port O'Connor, Texas, the storm broke several wind gauges and killed four people. Along the coast, boats were pushed ashore.
- September 16, 1970 – Later that year, Tropical Storm Felice made landfall in Texas.
- September 15, 1971 – Hurricane Edith caused tides up to 6' in Sabine Pass in 1971; soon afterwards, Hurricane Fern made landfall between Freeport, Texas and Matagorda, Texas as a tropical storm. Damage was minimal.
- September 4, 1973 – Tropical Storm Delia in 1973 made its first landfall on the Southeast Texas coast near Freeport, and after a loop it hit Freeport again a few days later. Six days later, Tropical Depression Six stalled over the Freeport, Texas area from the 10th to the 12th, bringing more rain to coastal areas that had already been saturated by Tropical Storm Delia. The depression caused $15 million more in crop damages.
- September 9, 1974 – In 1974, Hurricane Carmen made landfall in Louisiana producing heavy rainfall throughout Eastern Texas.

== 1975–1979 ==
Satellite image of Tropical Storm Amelia

- August 31, 1975 – Hurricane Caroline of 1975 made landfall 100 miles (160 km) south of Brownsville, Texas.
- September 22, 1977 – Hurricane Anita of 1977 made medium rainfall throughout the eastern Texas coast.
- August 1, 1978 – Tropical Storm Amelia (1978), with flooding rains, led to the deaths of 30 people in Texas in late July 1978. Later that year, Tropical Storm Debra made landfall halfway between Lake Charles, Louisiana and Beaumont, Texas, causing minimal damage.
- July 24, 1979 – From July 24 to 27, 1979, Tropical Storm Claudette produced torrential rains in both Texas and Louisiana when it made landfall. The highest total was reported in Alvin, Texas where 54 inches (1,400 mm) of rain fell. This remains the twenty-four-hour rainfall record for any location in the United States.
- September 1, 1979 – Later in 1979, Tropical Storm Elena made landfall near Sargent, Texas as a weak tropical storm, rapidly deteriorating as it moved inland. It caused less than $10 million in damage but managed to kill two people in floods.
- September 20, 1979 – Again in 1979, Tropical Depression Twenty produced rainfall in Louisiana and Texas after hitting Brownsville.

== Monthly statistics ==
Number of recorded storms affecting Texas
Month	Number of storms
June	5
July	8
August	2
September	12
October	1

== Deadly storms ==
The following is a list of hurricanes, tropical storms, and tropical depressions with known deaths in the state.

Hurricanes causing known deaths in Texas
Name	Year	Number of deaths	Notes
Carla	1961	46	
Alice	1954	17	
Beulah	1967	15	
Celia	1970	11	
Audrey	1957	9	
Cindy	1963	3	
Fern	1971	2	

== See also ==
- List of Texas hurricanes (pre-1900)
- List of Texas hurricanes (1980–present)
- List of wettest known tropical cyclones affecting Texas
