= KIOX-FM =

- Edna, Texas; United States
- Broadcast area: El Campo, Texas; Wharton, Texas
- Frequency: 96.1 MHz
- Branding: 96 Country

Programming
- Format: country

Ownership
- Owner: David Rowell; (Bay and Beyond Broadcasting LLC)
- Sister stations: KKHA, KBBB

History
- First air date: January 14, 1999 (as KGUL)
- Former call signs: KGUL (1998–2006); KEZB (2006–2008)

Technical information
- Licensing authority: FCC
- Facility ID: 27226
- Class: C3
- ERP: 13,000 watts
- HAAT: 139 meters
- Transmitter coordinates: 29°06′05″N 96°27′19″W

Links
- Public license information: Public file; LMS
- Webcast: Listen Live
- Website: www.96country.com

KIOX-FM (96.1 FM) is a radio station licensed to Edna, Texas. The station also serves the El Campo, Wharton County, Texas, Jackson County, Texas and Matagorda Country, Texas areas. Since June 2022, it has been owned by David Rowell, through licensee Bay and Beyond Broadcasting, LLC. KIOX-FM airs a Classic Country music format.

== History ==
The 96.1 facility in Edna was applied for and granted in 1996. It received the call sign of KGUL in 1998, prior to its January 1999 launch. The facility was originally owned by Hill Country Radio, and has since been owned by La Grange Broadcasting, Buckalew Media, & Fort Bend Broadcasting. Globecom Media purchased KIOX-FM in January 2014, and then sold the station together with their other station, KKHA, on to Bay and Beyond Broadcasting in June 2022.

The station was granted the KIOX-FM call sign by the Federal Communications Commission on January 4, 2008, effectively returning the longtime heritage call sign to El Campo and the rest of Wharton County where it had resided on 96.9 FM since 1990 and at 1270 AM since 1957.

KIOX-FM maintains local studios at 3600-C in Bay City, TX 77414, and has a satellite studio at 3000 Wyatt Ave in Bay City, TX 77414. Both facilities are shared with their two sister stations, KKHA and KBBB.
