= List of storms named Debra =

The name Debra has been used for three tropical cyclones in the Atlantic Ocean:

- Hurricane Debra (1959) – a weak Category 1 hurricane that made its landfall in Texas
- Hurricane Debra (1963) – a Category 1 hurricane that never affected land
- Tropical Storm Debra (1978) – a short-lived tropical storm that caused minimal damages in Louisiana

== See also ==
- Storm Deborah (2026) – a European windstorm with a similar name
