= Hurricane Celia =

Category 4 Atlantic hurricane in 1970

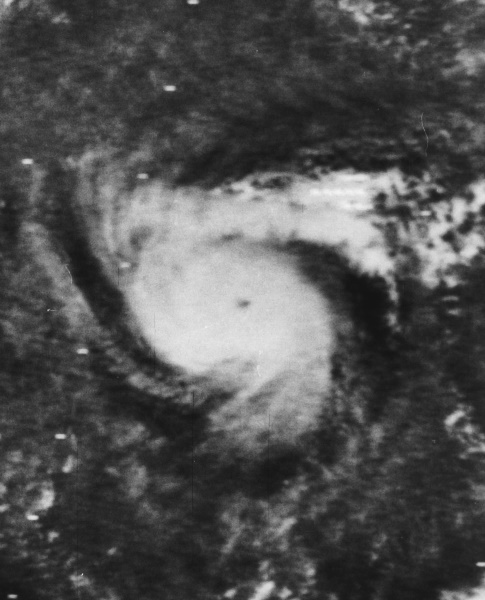
- Celia approaching Texas near peak intensity on August 3

Meteorological history
- Formed: July 31, 1970
- Dissipated: August 5, 1970

Category 4 major hurricane
- 1-minute sustained (SSHWS/NWS)
- Highest winds: 140 mph (220 km/h)
- Lowest pressure: 944 mbar (hPa); 27.88 inHg

Overall effects
- Fatalities: 28
- Damage: $930 million (1970 USD)
- Areas affected: Western Cuba, Coastal Florida and Texas
- IBTrACS
- Part of the 1970 Atlantic hurricane season

Hurricane Celia was the costliest tropical cyclone in Texas history until Hurricane Alicia in 1983. The third named storm, second hurricane, and first major hurricane of the 1970 Atlantic hurricane season, Celia developed from a tropical wave in the western Caribbean Sea on July 31. Initially, the depression tracked north-northwestward, crossing over western Cuba on August 1 and becoming Tropical Storm Celia. Heavy rains on the island caused severe flooding, leading to five fatalities. The storm entered the Gulf of Mexico, and due to the warm sea surface temperatures, Celia intensified into a hurricane later that day. Storm surge and swells lashed the west coast of Florida, especially the Panhandle, causing eight people to drown. On August 2 and early on August 3, Celia slightly weakened, however, the storm underwent rapid intensification and deepening, and peaked as a Category 4 hurricane at landfall with winds of 140 mph (220 km/h) later on August 3.

In Louisiana, tides caused minor coastal flooding. Minor erosion damage was reported along Highway 82 in Cameron Parish. Late afternoon on August 3, Celia made landfall near Corpus Christi, Texas. Throughout the state, 8,950 homes were destroyed and damaged about 55,650 others. About 252 small businesses, 331 boats, and 310 farm buildings were either damaged or destroyed. Impact was the worst in Nueces County, which observed gusts as high as 180 mph (290 km/h). In Corpus Christi, about one-third of houses suffered severe damage or were destroyed. Additionally, about 90% of the buildings in downtown were damaged to some degree. Celia weakened as it continued further inland and dissipated over New Mexico on August 6. The remnants of Celia brought up to 2 inches (51 mm) of rainfall to the state. Overall, this storm caused 28 deaths and $930 million (1970 USD) in damage.

== Meteorological history ==
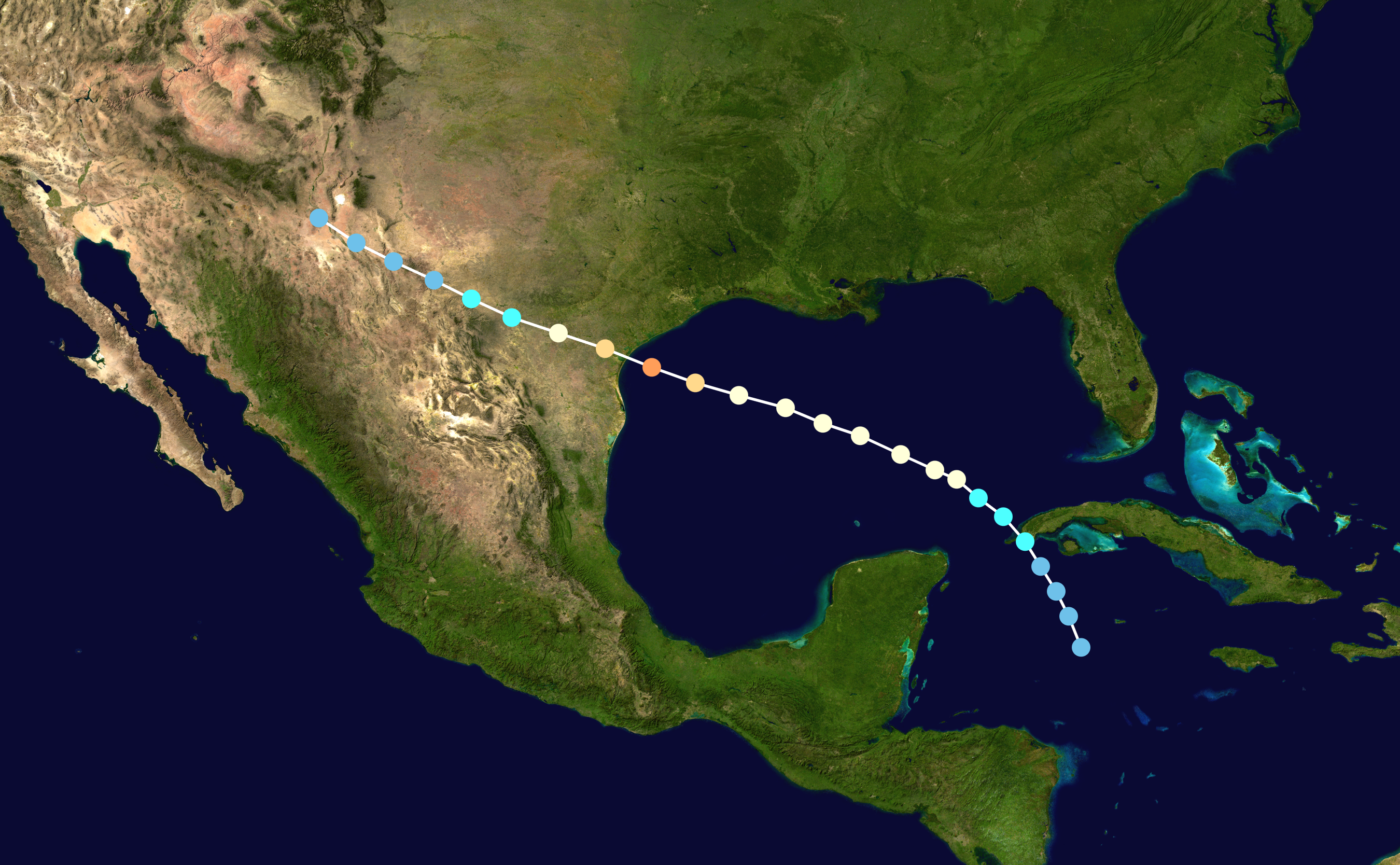
Map plotting the storm's track and intensity, according to the Saffir–Simpson scale (Note: The position of Celia's Category 4 peak is not depicted in this graphic as it is an asynoptic point (i.e. not at the 6-hour intervals of all other points) occurring at 21:00 UTC August 3, the time of Texas landfall.) Map key Saffir–Simpson scale Tropical depression (≤38 mph, ≤62 km/h) Tropical storm (39–73 mph, 63–118 km/h) Category 1 (74–95 mph, 119–153 km/h) Category 2 (96–110 mph, 154–177 km/h) Category 3 (111–129 mph, 178–208 km/h) Category 4 (130–156 mph, 209–251 km/h) Category 5 (≥157 mph, ≥252 km/h) Unknown Storm type Tropical cyclone Subtropical cyclone Extratropical cyclone, remnant low, tropical disturbance, or monsoon depression

A tropical wave emerged into the Atlantic Ocean from the west coast of Africa in late July; a weather station in Dakar, Senegal observed a wind shift on July 23. The system moved quickly across the Atlantic at 20 and 25 mph (32 and 40 km/h) and reached the Lesser Antilles by July 28. The wave then continued moving rapidly westward across the Caribbean Sea. However, falling atmospheric pressures over the Southern United States eroded a subtropical ridge, causing the system to decelerate by July 30. Around that time, a closed circulation began to organize in the northwestern Caribbean between the Cayman Islands and Swan Island. At 0000 UTC on July 31, a tropical depression developed about 90 mi (145 km) west-southwest of Grand Cayman. The depression strengthened while heading north-northwestward, though a reconnaissance aircraft could not complete its mission on July 31 due to the depression's proximity to Cuba.

On August 1, at 0000 UTC, the depression reached tropical storm intensity as it made landfall in western Pinar del Río Province, Cuba. A weather station in Cape San Antonio recorded a minimum barometric pressure of 1,007 mbar (29.7 inHg). After reaching the southeastern Gulf of Mexico on August 1, warm sea surface temperatures caused the storm to undergo rapid deepening. Later that day, the storm was named "Celia", based on a reconnaissance flight observing tropical storm force winds. Satellite imagery indicated that Celia was becoming significantly more organized, and at 1800 UTC, the storm became a hurricane with 75 miles per hour (121 km/h) winds. The storm reached an initial peak intensity with winds of 90 miles per hour (140 km/h) from 0000 UTC to 1200 UTC on August 2, before slightly weakening. Celia's pressure continued to drop, however, as its wind speeds remained steady, reaching a minimum of 983 mbar (29.0 inHg). Due to Celia's steady west-northwestward motion across the Gulf of Mexico, the National Hurricane Center marked that the storm "aimed at the Corpus Christi area like a wild beast stalking its prey." Early on August 3, it weakened slightly further, with winds of 80 miles per hour (130 km/h) and a pressure of 988 mbar (29.2 inHg).

As it turned towards the coast, Celia began to intensify very rapidly later on August 3, including a 44 mbar (1.3 inHg) decrease in pressure in only 15 hours, and strengthened quickly right up to landfall along the Texas coast. At the time of landfall, which took place at 2100 UTC on August 3, Celia attained its peak intensity with maximum sustained winds of 140 mph (220 km/h) and a minimum barometric pressure of 944 mbar (27.9 inHg). Celia "maintained strength for an unusually long time" after moving inland, weakening to a tropical storm at 1200 UTC on August 4. Early on the following day, the storm further weakened to a tropical depression. Celia dissipated over western Texas at 1800 UTC on August 5, though the remnants persisted until reaching New Mexico.

== Preparations ==
In the Gulf of Mexico, oil rig crew workers began leaving and headed for land. Residents of Texas coastal towns of High Island, Port Bolivar, and Gilchrist were evacuated further inland. The National Hurricane Center also issued tropical cyclone warnings and watches along the coast of Texas in anticipation of the storm. At 1600 UTC on August 2, a hurricane warning was posted from Palacios to Port Arthur. About six hours later, the warning was extended southward to Rockport. The hurricane warning was expanded further southward to Corpus Christi at 1000 UTC on August 3.

Celia was initially forecast to stay well north of Corpus Christi. However, on August 3, the forecast depicted a direct hit on the city. With little warning, many residents did not have enough time to make correct preparations.

== Impact ==
Celia caused 27 fatalities, four in Cuba, eight in Florida and 15 in Texas and left $930 million in damages. Corpus Christi, Texas suffered the worst impact, with at least 85% of all the structures in the city damaged, with 90% of downtown buildings were damaged or destroyed. Additionally, about one-third of houses were severely damaged or flattened.

=== Cuba and Florida ===
As a tropical depression, Celia dropped heavy rains over western Cuba, resulting in major flooding. Four people drowned and another man was electrocuted in the water when he tried to retrieve a downed power line. While over the central Gulf of Mexico, strong rip currents and large swells affected Florida, measuring up to 10 feet (3.0 m) in the Panhandle. In Escambia County alone, at least 12 lifeguard rescues occurred. Pensacola Beach was closed to the public on September 3, after several rescues on the previous day. Eight people drowned due to adverse water conditions in the Florida Panhandle.

=== Texas ===
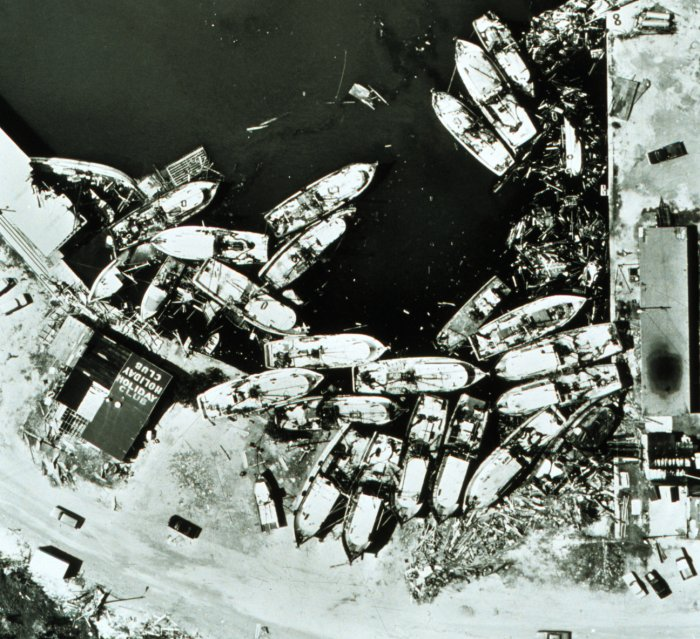
Boats blown ashore by Celia at Aransas Pass

The most severe damage was in Corpus Christi and Aransas Pass. Throughout the state, 8,950 homes were destroyed and it damaged about 55,650 others. About 252 small businesses, 331 boats, and 310 farm buildings were either damaged or destroyed. Initially, losses were estimated to have reached $434 million. However, due to lower insurance rate of coverage, the original insured losses, $310 million, were tripled, rather than doubled. Thus, the damage toll was revised upward to $930 million in 2011. Damage to crops was slightly more than $8.8 million. In addition, Celia caused 15 fatalities and injured 466 others. The most severe damage occurred in the streaks of damage, not by tornadoes, but a series microbursts and downbursts, most of which occurred in a 15-minute span. Survivors of the storm described the downbursts as "rocket shells" exploding. In the most extreme cases, wind damage reached levels comparable to that of an EF4 tornado. However, areas between the streaks suffered surprisingly little damage, mainly ornamental due to debris from the homes nearby. Celia dropped heavy rains as it made landfall. However, due to the small size and fast movement of the storm, precipitation was not widespread. At the time of landfall, much of Texas was suffering from a drought. Most areas received 3 to 4 in (76 to 102 mm).

In Alvin, a small tornado caused the destruction of a few fences and moved a pickup truck. Downed trees caused slight property damage in Amistad Dam, a municipality in Val Verde County. Gusts between 170 and 180 mph (270 and 290 km/h) were reported within the Aransas County portion of Aransas Pass. In Artesia Wells, minimal damage occurred to property, reaching only $5,000. The storm damage some homes and 15% of crops in Austwell. Losses in that section of the city reached an estimated $20 million. Minor damage was inflicted on weak structures and shingle or metal roofs in Crystal City. Impact on trees and crops were minimal. Thus, the reported wind speeds of 85–90 mph (137–145 km/h) were considered "doubtful".

Property damage in Del Rio was about $1 million, with wind impacts mostly to roofs, mobile homes, signs, boats, windows, trees, and homes under construction, while some businesses and homes were flooded. In Frio County, a tornado spawned in the Dilley area toppled utility poles, destroyed several chicken houses, and blew the roof of a house 600 to 900 feet (180 to 270 m) away. In addition, two farm houses were deroofed and several outhouses were damaged. Another tornado spawned nearby caused "considerable" damage to the Dilley Civic Center, destroyed machine sheds, unroofed outbuildings, and felled many electrical poles. Throughout Dilley, there was $250,000 in property damage and $350,000 in crop losses. An estimated $50,000 was inflected to property in Eagle Pass. Strong winds in George West caused damage to 90% of trees, some houses, and cotton crops. Damage estimates in the city range from $250,000–$500,000. In Gregory, property losses was about $1 million, while there was about $25,000 in damage to crops. Near Lake Corpus Christi, a man died after he was struck by debris from his house, which was hit by a tornado. Two other people were injured by that tornado and several homes were destroyed. The storm spawned at least 2 other tornadoes, those neither caused any known damage.

Damage in Langtry was very minor, reaching only $600. A tornado in Port O'Connor, destroyed a 30 by 230 feet (9.1 by 70.1 m) boat storage shed, which was owned by Cooperative Weather Observed Bill H. Young. In Refugio, a rancher observed wind gusts up to 142 mph (229 km/h). About $707,500 in damage occurred to property, while crop losses reached $425,000. One injury was reported after a person was struck by flying glass. Wind gusts up to 160 mph (260 km/h) in Sandia damaged every house, 90% of cotton crops, and caused 1 fatality. Although wind gusts of 168 mph (270 km/h) were observed in Taft, only $5 million in property and $500,000 in crop damages were reported. In Tilden, the storm brought maximum sustained winds up to 100 mph (160 km/h). As a result, the entire city lost telephone and electrical services and there was "lots of damage" to trees, 80% of houses, and roofs. Property damage reached about $3.4 million, while there was also $25,000 in crop losses. Property losses in Uvalde reached $100,000, while damage to crops was estimated at $250,000. Additionally, a tornado was spawned in Yoakum, though it apparently caused negligible impact.

==== Nueces County ====
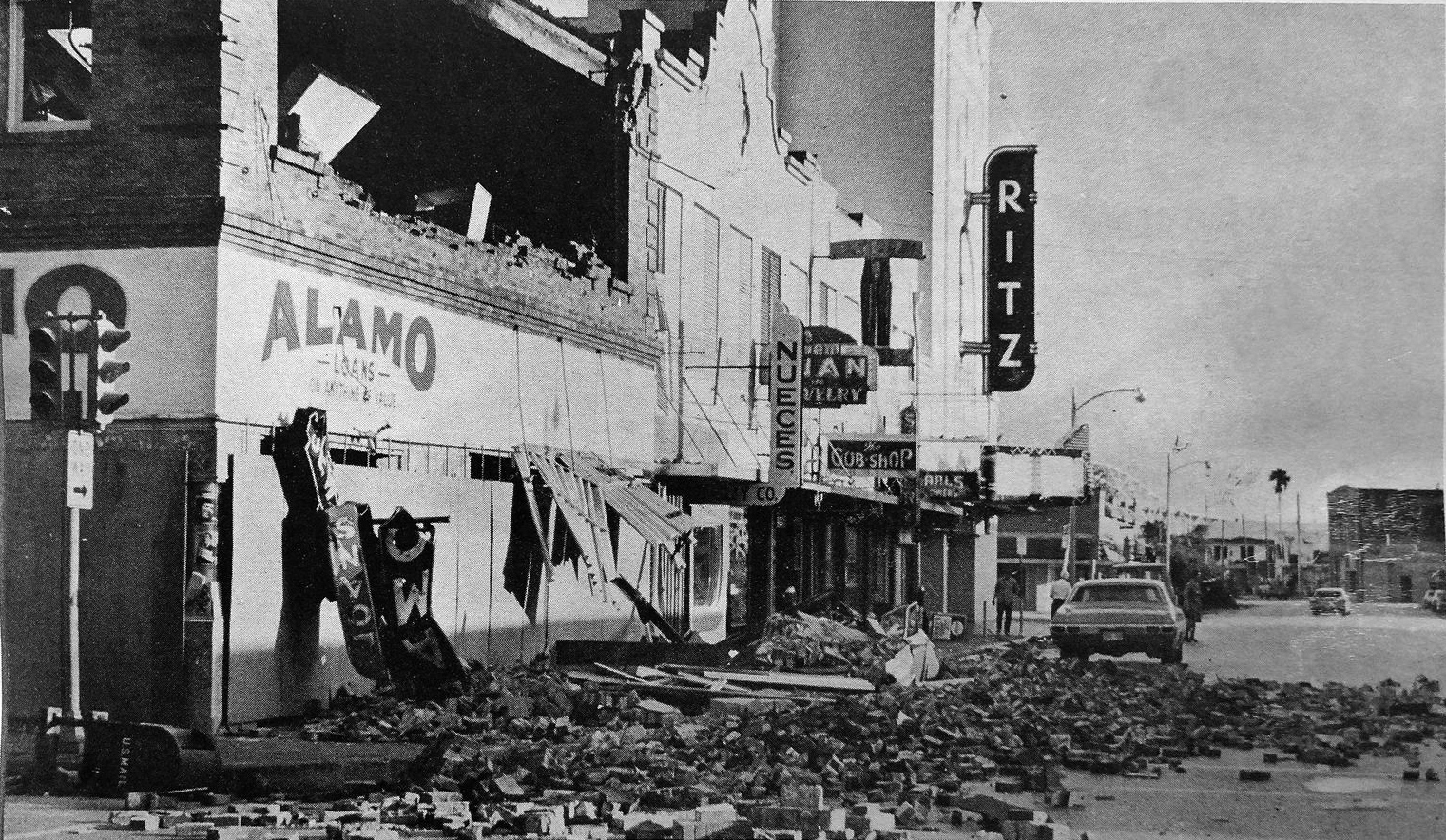
Damaged building in Corpus Christi

The highest tides produced by the storm lashed Nueces County. Tides were 9.2 feet (2.8 m) and 9 feet (2.7 m) mean sea level at Port Aransas Beach and the Port Aransas Jetty, respectively. The heaviest rainfall totals observed from the storm also fell in Nueces County, with 7.26 inches (184 mm) of precipitation reported in Robstown. Because rainfall was relatively light, minor, if any flood damage occurred. Strong winds were reported, with winds gusts measuring as high as 161 mph (259 km/h) and 180 mph (290 km/h) at the Corpus Christi Weather Bureau Office and Aransas Pass, respectively. Further inland, wind gusts were estimated to have reached 180 mph (290 km/h) at Robstown High School, as the oil derricks on the property, built to withstand winds of 175 mph (282 km/h), were knocked down.

Due to high winds, 85% of the total property damage caused by the storm occurred in Corpus Christi, with 90% of the buildings in downtown either damaged or destroyed. About a third of the houses in the city had serious damage or were destroyed. The University of Corpus Christi, a private institution located on Ward Island, suffered so much damage that it could not afford to rebuild, and it was sold to the State in 1973. Just northeast of the Corpus Christi International Airport, several hundred mobile homes were ripped into small fragments, and the remains were scattered for hundreds of yards. Facilities owned by the Southwestern Bell Corporation (which later became AT&T) suffered $10 million in losses. Another telephone company in the area, General Telephone Company, estimated $700,000 in damage occurred to its business. At the United States Army helicopter repair center in Corpus Christi, there were about $5 million in damage. Around 800–900 family housing units at the Naval Air Station Corpus Christi were considered uninhabitable, indicating $35 million in losses at that location.

Two large Sunoco oil tanks and another owned by Humble Oil burned after possibly being struck by lightning. Approximately $17 million in losses occurred to both companies. Heavy property damage was also reported in rural areas, totaling slightly more than $20 million. At least 75% of the buildings in Port Aransas were damaged. Overall, 74% of property losses associated with Celia were in Nueces County.

=== Elsewhere ===
While crossing the Gulf of Mexico, Celia produced tides 1 to 2 feet (0.30 to 0.61 m) above normal on the southwestern coast of Louisiana. As a result, slight erosion of Louisiana Highway 82 occurred in Cameron Parish between Johnson Bayou and Holly Beach. No damage or fatalities were reported in that state. After dissipating, the remnants of Celia produced up to 2 inches (51 mm) of rain in New Mexico, though no other impacts in the state are known.

== Aftermath ==
Following the storm, then-President of the United States Richard Nixon declared seven counties in Texas as disaster areas – Aransas, Bee, Jim Wells, Live Oak, Nueces, Refugio, and San Patricio – allowing affected residents to be eligible for federal relief. Immediately, then-Governor of Texas Preston Smith sent National Guardsmen to the area to patrol and assist with recovery. About a week after the storm, Governor Smith stated that the most urgent need was financial assistance, and designated the American Red Cross as the official relief agency. The American Red Cross chapters in Colbert and Lauderdale counties in Alabama announced that they were accepting donations to send to southern Texas.

In Corpus Christi, officials applied to pollution control officers for permission to burn 1,300,000 cubic yards (990,000 m^{3}) of debris. The University of Corpus Christi (UCC) suffered so much damage that repairs were not affordable. In May 1971, the Texas Legislature passed a bill to establish a Texas A&I campus in Corpus Christi. Two years later, after local residents raised approximately $1.8 million to support the school, the UCC transferred its properties to Texas A&I University (now known as Texas A&M University-Corpus Christi).

In addition, most homeowners insurance policies refused to write insurance for areas considered to be "high risk" along the Texas coast, prompting the state government to form the Texas Catastrophe Property Insurance Association, now known as the Texas Windstorm Insurance Association. Today, TWIA offers coverage to the 14 coastal counties of Texas and a small portion of Harris County near Houston, Texas.

=== Retirement ===
Due to the severity of damage caused by the hurricane, the National Hurricane Center retired the name Celia following the 1970 season, and it will never be used again for another Atlantic tropical cyclone. It was replaced with Carmen for the 1974 season.

== See also ==
- List of Texas hurricanes (1950–1979)
- Hurricane Harvey (2017) – Category 4 hurricane that made landfall in Texas and Louisiana, causing catastrophic flooding and more than 100 deaths
