= Hurricane Carla =

Category 4 Atlantic hurricane in 1961

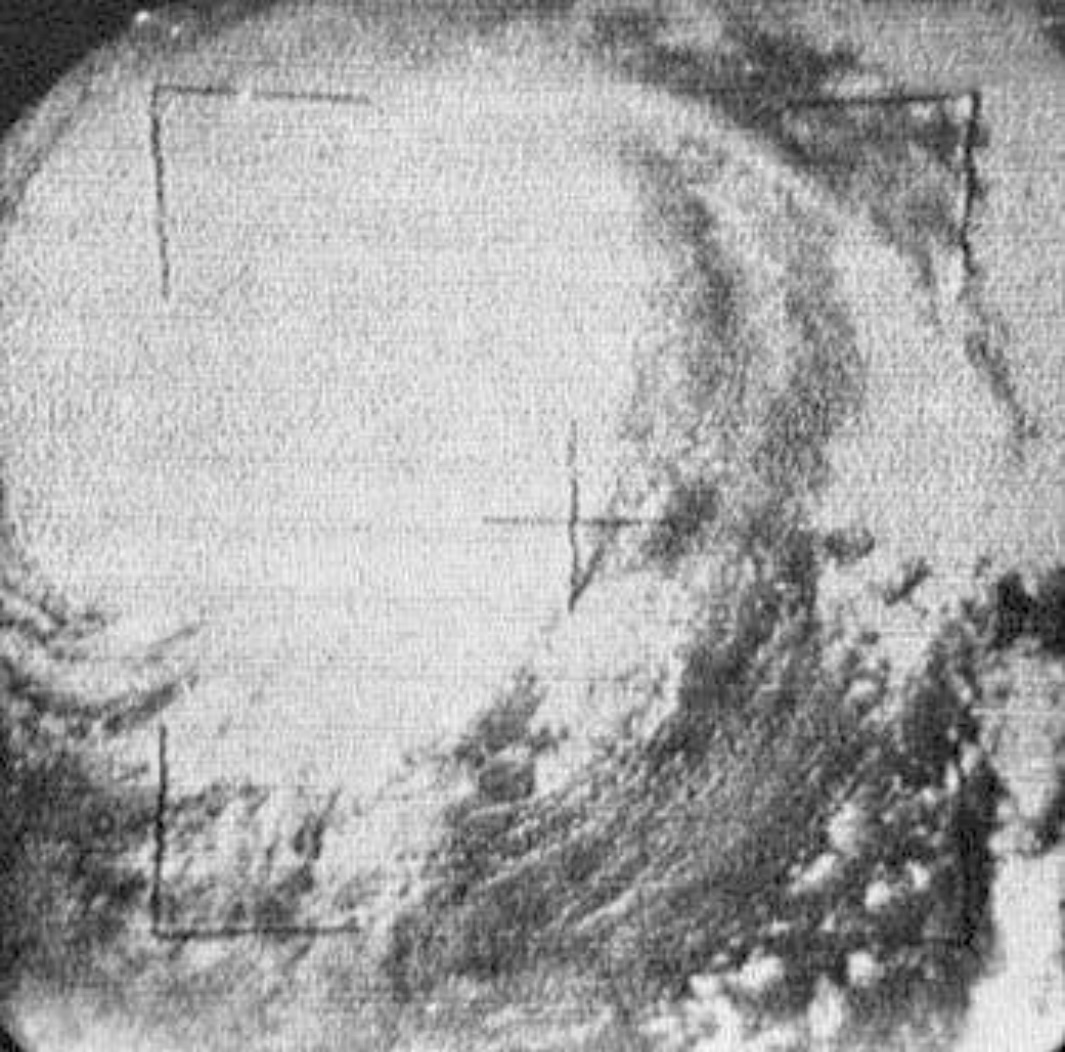
- Satellite image of Hurricane Carla on September 10.

Meteorological history
- Formed: September 3, 1961
- Extratropical: September 13, 1961
- Dissipated: September 18, 1961

Category 4 major hurricane
- 1-minute sustained (SSHWS/NWS)
- Highest winds: 145 mph (230 km/h)
- Lowest pressure: 927 mbar (hPa); 27.37 inHg

Overall effects
- Fatalities: 46
- Damage: $442 million (1961 USD)
- Areas affected: Yucatán Peninsula, Texas, Central United States, Great Lakes region, Canada
- IBTrACS
- Part of the 1961 Atlantic hurricane season

Hurricane Carla was a powerful and destructive tropical cyclone that made landfall in Texas as a Category 4 on the Saffir–Simpson scale. Striking the middle Texas coast in September 1961, Carla was the second most intense hurricane on record in Texas, only behind the 1886 Indianola hurricane. The third named storm of the 1961 Atlantic hurricane season, Carla developed from an area of squally weather in the southwestern Caribbean Sea on September 3. The system was upgraded to a tropical storm on September 5 and reached hurricane intensity the next day. On September 7, Carla entered the Gulf of Mexico, passing northeast of the Yucatán Peninsula. Early on September 10, Carla became a Category 4 hurricane and peaked in intensity a day later with maximum sustained winds of 145 miles per hour (235 kilometres per hour) and a minimum central pressure of 927 millibars (27.4 inches of mercury). The hurricane made landfall in the afternoon of September 11 near Port O'Connor, Texas with the same wind speed and a slightly higher pressure. Traveling inland, Carla weakened to a tropical storm on September 12 and transitioned into an extratropical cyclone on September 13 while centered over southern Oklahoma. Carla's remnants reached the Labrador Sea, Canada and dissipated on September 18, 1961.

While crossing the Yucatán Channel, the outer bands of Carla brought high winds and local flooding in western Cuba and the Yucatán Peninsula. In Texas, Carla brought sustained winds as high as 145 mph (233 km/h) and a storm surge as high as 22 feet (6.7 metres) to a wide stretch of coast. Carla also spawned several tornadoes in the state, including an F4 (Note: Prior to 2007, tornadoes in the United States were rated on the Fujita Scale, which categorizes tornado intensity from F0 to F5. This was replaced by the Enhanced Fujita Scale in 2007.) tornado near Galveston which killed eight people.

Throughout Texas, Carla damaged or destroyed over 60,000 buildings and killed 34 people. Several tornadoes also touched down in Louisiana, killing six people and causing additional damage. Heavy rainfall from Carla impacted other states, especially Kansas and Missouri, where flash flooding severely damaged crops and killed six people. Overall, Carla resulted in over $442 million (Note: All currency totals are unadjusted for inflation.) in losses and 46 fatalities. The name Carla was retired following the season.

== Meteorological history ==
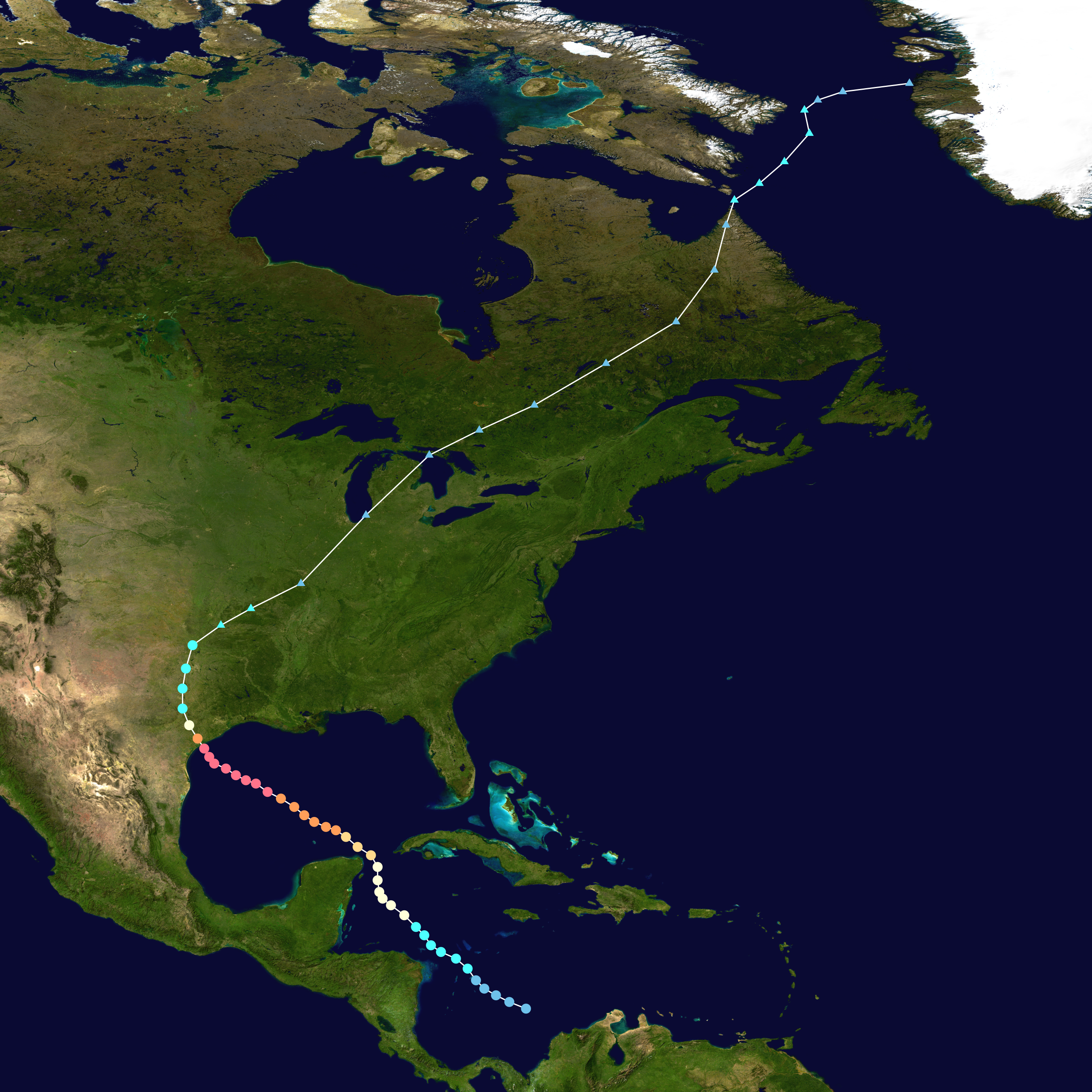
Map plotting the storm's track and intensity, according to the Saffir–Simpson scale Map key Saffir–Simpson scale Tropical depression (≤38 mph, ≤62 km/h) Tropical storm (39–73 mph, 63–118 km/h) Category 1 (74–95 mph, 119–153 km/h) Category 2 (96–110 mph, 154–177 km/h) Category 3 (111–129 mph, 178–208 km/h) Category 4 (130–156 mph, 209–251 km/h) Category 5 (≥157 mph, ≥252 km/h) Unknown Storm type Tropical cyclone Subtropical cyclone Extratropical cyclone, remnant low, tropical disturbance, or monsoon depression

As early as September 1, a tropical disturbance – an area of convective activity – was observed tracking westward across the Caribbean Sea within the Intertropical Convergence Zone (ITCZ). Around that time, an anticyclone was situated over the western Caribbean Sea at the upper-tropospheric levels. Surface analysis indicated that a low-level circulation was developing early on September 3, and this became a tropical depression – a tropical cyclone with sustained winds of less than 39 mph (63 km/h) – about 175 miles (282 km) northwest of Barranquilla, Colombia at 1200 UTC.

The storm strengthened into a 40 mph (64 km/h) tropical storm by late on September 4. Operationally, the system was not considered a tropical storm until midday on the 5th, at which point it was given the name Carla. A reconnaissance aircraft flight on September 5 found that Carla was continuing to intensify, with a central pressure of 998 mbar (29.5 inHg) and winds rising to 50 mph (80 km/h). Radar indicated that the system was an unusually large tropical cyclone, with convective bands extending about 520 miles (840 km) outward from the center. Around midnight on September 6, Carla passed near Swan Island, which reported a barometric pressure of about 995 mbar (29.4 inHg) and wind gusts of 60 mph (97 km/h) from the southwest. Aircraft reconnaissance that day found that the storm had deepened substantially, with the barometric pressure falling to 982 mbar (29.0 inHg), and Carla is estimated to have reached hurricane intensity earlier in the day.

The hurricane remained relatively steady for much of the next day, with the pressure measured by aircraft that morning remaining near 982 mbar (29.0 inHg). However, Carla began strengthening again late in the day, reaching Category 2 strength. Shortly thereafter, the hurricane crossed the Yucatán Channel and entered the Gulf of Mexico, where a strong high-pressure area forced Carla into a northwestern direction.

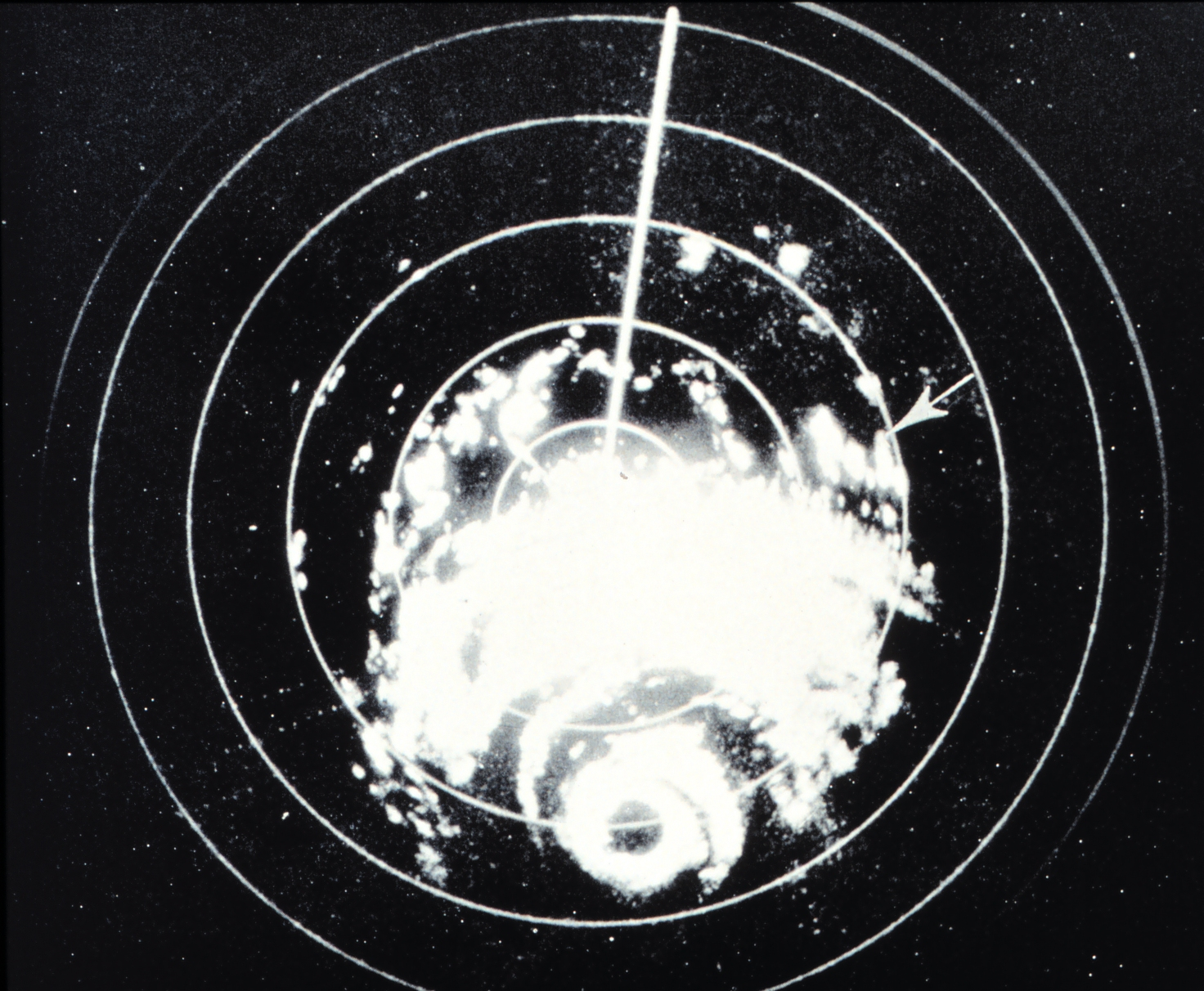
Radar image of Carla from WSR-57 in Galveston, Texas

Carla continued to strengthen, and by midday on September 8 the storm was a Category 3 major hurricane. (Note: A major hurricane is a storm that ranks as Category 3 or higher on the Saffir–Simpson hurricane scale.) Carla was a large hurricane, with a radius of maximum winds 40 miles (64 km) wide. The storm strengthened into a Category 4 hurricane on the morning of September 10, while approaching the Gulf Coast of the United States, and reached its peak intensity early on the 11th, with maximum sustained winds of 145 mph (235 km/h) and a minimum pressure of 927 mbar (27.4 inHg). Operationally, Carla was considered to have had peak winds of 175 mph (280 km/h), making it a Category 5 hurricane on the Saffir-Simpson scale, the highest classification. However, a reanalysis of the storm published in 2018 concluded that Carla never reached Category 5 strength.

Late on September 11, Carla made landfall on the northeastern tip of Matagorda Island, Texas with winds of 145 mph (235 km/h) and a minimum pressure of 931 mbar (27.5 inHg). Modern reanalysis estimated winds at landfall using the pressure-wind relationship for a hurricane of Carla's size and latitude as well as two reports of sustained winds near 140 mph (230 km/h) along the coast. Carla's landfall pressure was the lowest in Texas during the 20th century, and the second lowest on record in the state after the 1886 Indianola hurricane. Carla rapidly weakened inland, and fell below hurricane strength by noon on September 12. Late on that day, the storm curved just east of due north. As Carla moved inland, it spawned an outbreak of tornadoes, all of them occurring to the right of the track. After reaching Oklahoma on September 13, Carla transitioned into an extratropical cyclone while over the east-central portion of the state. The remnants of Carla moved rapidly northeastward and brought heavy rainfall to some areas of the Great Plains and Midwestern United States. By September 14, the remnants moved over Lake Huron as an extratropical depression. On September 16, Carla's remnants briefly regained gale-force winds before dissipating shortly after midnight on September 18.

== Preparations ==
Officials in the Florida Keys took precautions to brace for potential impact from the storm. The United States Navy flew their planes out of Key West, while Coast Guardsmen evacuated Alligator Reef Light, American Shoal Light, and Sombrero Key Light. Ships docked at Key West sailed out to sea to ride out the squalls. On the morning of September 7, a hurricane watch was issued from the entire coast of Louisiana eastward to Apalachicola, Florida. On September 8, a hurricane watch was issued along the southwest coast of the state from Vermilion Bay westward. It was later extended westward to include the entire coast of Texas, and eastward to Apalachicola, Florida. A portion of the hurricane watch from Aransas Pass, Texas to Grand Isle, Louisiana was upgraded to a hurricane warning at 1600 UTC on September 9.

Then little-known newsman Dan Rather reported live from the weather bureau office in Galveston as the storm approached, live on-site storm coverage that would be imitated by later reporters. Rather asked a meteorologist to outline the Gulf of Mexico on a transparent sheet of plastic. He then held the map over the black and white radar screen, which put the size of Carla into perspective. This marked the first live television broadcast of a radar image of a hurricane.

An estimated 500,000 people fled the coasts of Texas and Louisiana, making it the largest evacuation in the history of the United States at the time. In Louisiana, the number of evacuees was estimated to be at least 50,000 by state civil defense officials, and as high as 80,000 by the Red Cross. Coastal parishes in the state, "galvanized... by the memory of [hurricane] Audrey," began ordering evacuations as early as Friday, September 8. Evacuation orders were given out over radio, television, loudspeaker, and by police going door-to-door to warn residents. 95% of Plaquemines Parish evacuated, as did nearly all of Grand Isle. Officials estimated that communities in Cameron Parish had evacuation rates between 99 and 100%, and the parish government relocated to Lake Charles. In small towns along the coast of Texas, 90–100% of the population evacuated, while 20% of people left the larger cities. Many in Galveston stayed due to protection from the Galveston Seawall. Public shelters in both states were administered by the American Red Cross, which opened shelters as far inland as Dallas and Fort Worth. Most official shelters were schools, though other public buildings such as churches and theaters were also used. Many people also sought refuge in "unauthorized shelters" not officially administered by the Red Cross. In Galveston, about 1200 people sought shelter at the courthouse, and some were injured when the building was struck by a tornado. Some shelters, mainly schools, were racially segregated.

As heavy rains began to impact areas of Missouri and Kansas, officials began evacuating low-lying areas. In Kansas City, the Red Cross set up shelters and residents near local lakes and creeks were evacuated. Local businesses began sandbagging in anticipation of further flooding. Missouri Governor John M. Dalton ordered the 110th Engineers combat battalion to assist in the efforts.

== Impact ==
Throughout its path, 46 fatalities and about $442 million in damage were attributed to Carla. Most of the impact occurred in Texas, where the storm made landfall as a large and strong Category 4 hurricane.

=== Caribbean and Gulf of Mexico ===
In Cuba, broadcasts reported severe flooding near Pinar del Río, Los Colomas, and Punta de Cartas. Offshore Honduras on Swan Island, a rainfall amount of 3.89 inches (99 mm) was reported along with wind gusts up to 60 mph (97 km/h). In Mexico, winds may have reached hurricane-force in remote areas on the northeast tip of the Yucatán Peninsula. Damage to offshore Oil platforms in the Gulf of Mexico was estimated at $5 million.

=== United States ===
==== Texas ====
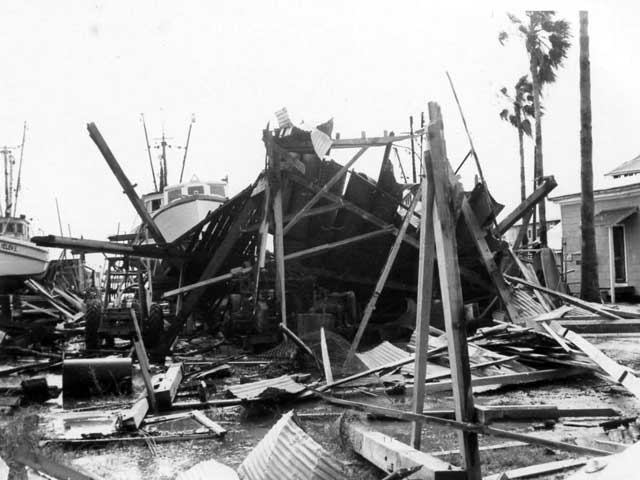
A house destroyed by Hurricane Carla in Port O'Connor, Texas

Abnormally high tides and storm surge occurred along the entire coast of Texas, reaching 10–12 feet (3.0–3.7 m) above mean sea level along a large swath of the coast to the right of Carla's center. The storm flooded over 1,700,000 acres (690,000 ha) of land, with surge reaching 10 miles inland in some areas. The highest storm surge was recorded in Matagorda Bay, where water reached over 20 feet (6.1 m) above sea level. The highest recorded water level was 22 feet (6.7 m) at Port Lavaca, based on a high-water mark left inside of a house on the eastern side of Lavaca Bay. Elsewhere, tides reached 16.3 feet (5.0 m) at Port Houston, 9 feet (2.7 m) at Galveston, and 6.5 feet (2.0 m) at Corpus Christi. Carla also produced powerful winds along its path. The highest sustained wind observations during the storm were two reports of 140 mph (230 km/h) winds at Matagorda and Port Lavaca. (Note: These observations were converted to sustained winds from fastest mile, which was the wind speed corresponding to 1 mi (1.6 km) of air passing through an anemometer.) Gusts in Matagorda reached 160 mph (260 km/h), and the anemometer in Port Lavaca blew away after a gust to 153 mph (246 km/h); wind gusts afterwards were visually estimated to have reached over 175 mph (282 km/h). An Alcoa plant in Point Comfort reported a wind gust over 120 mph (190 km/h) before the instrument failed, and an industrial plant in Victoria recorded a maximum gust of 104 mph (167 km/h). Further inland, the Weather Bureau offices in Houston, Austin, and Dallas reported maximum gusts of 77 mph (124 km/h), 68 mph (109 km/h), and 50 mph (80 km/h), respectively. Carla also produced heavy rainfall in Texas, peaking at 17.48 inches (444 mm) in Bay City, while Galveston, Wharton, Liberty, and Dickinson all reported rainfall totals over 1 foot (300 mm). Carla spawned at least 11 tornadoes in Texas.

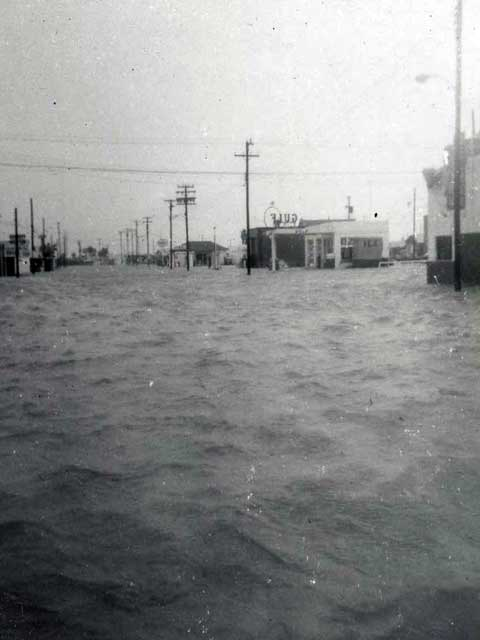
Tidal flooding caused by Hurricane Carla

Throughout Texas, Carla destroyed 1,915 homes and 983 other buildings, and caused damage to another 50,723 homes and 16,107 other buildings. An estimated 1.5 million board-feet of lumber was damaged by the hurricane. Rice and citrus crops in the state were substantially damaged. About 166,000 customers lost telephone service. The US Army Corps of Engineers estimated damage in Texas at more than $408 million dollars, including $60.9 million dollars in agricultural losses, $12.3 million in damage to transportation infrastructure, and nearly $10 million in damage to utilities. It was also estimated that over $30 million in damage was prevented by flood control projects, mainly the Galveston seawall. 34 people were killed in Texas, including 22 who drowned, 8 who were killed by a tornado in Galveston, and 4 who died from electrocution by downed power lines. There were over 460 injuries in Texas, according to the American Red Cross.

The most significant property damage occurred between Port Arthur and Corpus Christi. At least 75% of Port O'Connor was destroyed. Matagorda Island Air Force Base suffered $18 million in damage. Flooding caused $2 million in damage at two Dow Chemical plants near Freeport. High water and wave action washed away highway 87 between Sabine and High Island. The storm was costliest in Galveston county, where damage was estimated to be nearly $84.5 million. Most of the Bolivar peninsula flooded, as well as areas of Galveston below 9 ft (2.7 m) in elevation. Galveston was also struck by multiple tornadoes, including an F4 that damaged over 200 buildings, destroying at least 60, and killed 8 people. Despite being partially protected by levees, most of Texas City was inundated. Further down the coast, storm surge flooded most of Port Aransas as well as the North Beach area of Corpus Christi. Flooding in the Brownsville area was mainly limited to beach fronts.

Carla's winds continued to cause damage as the storm moved inland. In Victoria, high winds destroyed trailers, tore roofs off buildings, and blew out storefront windows. One school was badly damaged by high winds and water intrusion. About 4,260 homes in the city were damaged, with around 500 severely damaged or destroyed. 43 businesses and 26 public buildings were also significantly impacted. Damage in the city reached $10 million. In Edna, winds blew away the roof of a school sheltering 200 people. Further inland, the storm caused an estimated $5,000 in damage to the grounds of the Texas State Capitol. Four buildings were unroofed in San Marcos. The storm brought strong winds and high waves to Lewisville Lake, damaging a barge and causing a boathouse to collapse. A church in Denton suffered severe roof and wall damage. Several tornadoes also touched down as the storm moved inland, including significant tornadoes (Note: A "significant tornado" is a tornado rated F2/EF2 or above on the Fujita scale or the Enhanced Fujita Scale.) in Fulbright, Jacksonville, and Hardin.

==== Louisiana ====
In southeastern Louisiana, abnormally high tides lashed the coast, though no beach erosion was reported. Cameron Parish reported a high tide 7 ft (2.1 m) above normal, causing water to enter some stores. The highest reported wind in the state was a gust to 60 mph (97 km/h) in Cameron. In Lake Charles, sustained winds peaked at 44 mph (71 km/h) and gusts reached 55 mph (89 km/h). The winds caused minor damage, limited to damaged roofs and glass as well as tree limbs. Winds caused a local river to reach 1 foot (0.30 m) above flood stage. Rainfall was heavy, peaking at 13.9 inches (350 mm) in Many. The 11 tornadoes spawned by Carla in Louisiana destroyed 140 homes and 11 other buildings, while causing damage to 979 additional homes and 86 other buildings. Six fatalities and 199 injuries occurred, mostly related to the tornadoes. Damage in Louisiana totaled to about $25 million. A breakdown of losses include $6 million to agriculture, $5 million to buildings, $4 million to boats and beach property, $3 million to roads and bridges, and $2 million in miscellaneous damage.

==== Central US ====
===== Oklahoma =====
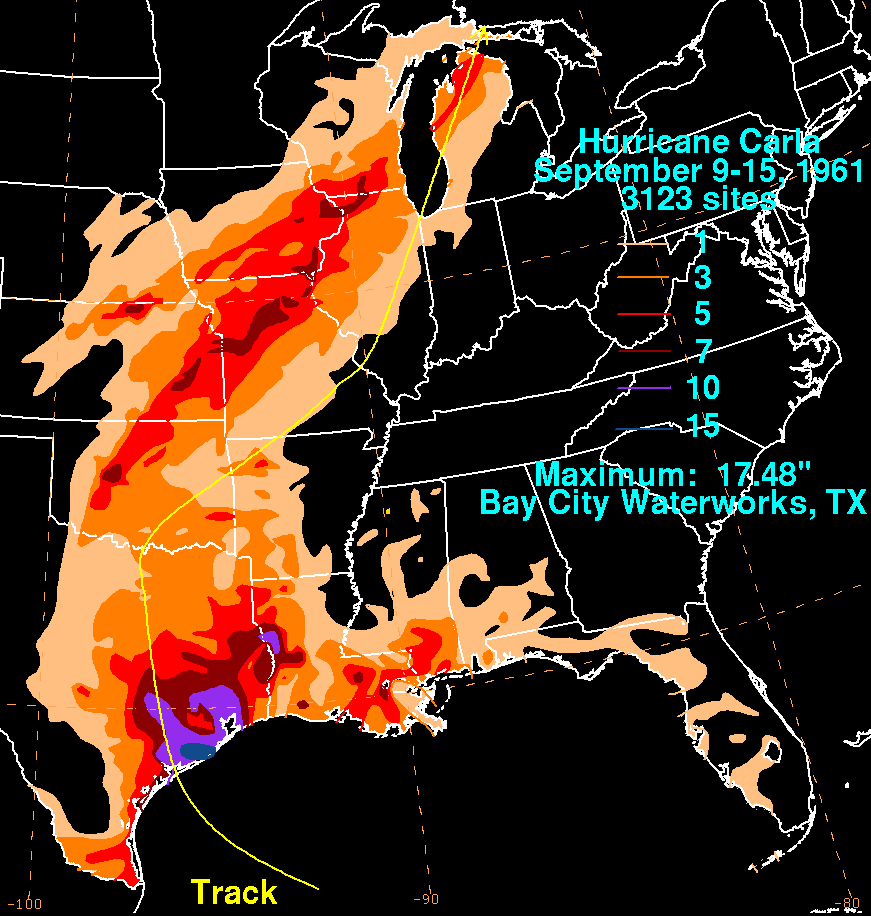
Rainfall from Carla in the United States

Carla's remnants brought heavy rainfall and strong winds to portions of eastern Oklahoma. About 2–8 inches (51–203 mm) of rain fell in Grant, Tillman, Washita Counties. Heavier amounts of at least 5 inches (130 mm) fell in Atoka and Pushmataha counties. Precipitation in the state peaked at 7.68 inches (195 mm) in Kingfisher. More than 140 city blocks were flooded with up to 6 feet (1.8 m) of water in residential areas of Kingfisher and up to 3 feet (0.91 m) in business areas. 225 homes and buildings in the city suffered water damage. Elsewhere in the state, there was damage to 90 homes and buildings in Tulsa, 50 homes each in El Reno and Oklahoma City, and 10 homes in Pawnee. Additionally, water washed out several bridges and highways in northeastern parts of the state, leaving roads impassable. Sustained winds between 30 and 55 mph (48 and 89 km/h) and gusts up to 70 mph (110 km/h) were recorded in Oklahoma, and flying debris injured two people. Winds and rain combined severely disrupted electrical and telephone services and caused $670,000 in damage, with $600,000 to property and $70,000 to crops.

===== Kansas and Missouri =====
In Kansas, rain totals of 4 to 7 inches (100 to 180 mm) over only 6 hours caused flash flooding. With a peak amount of 8.52 inches (216 mm) in Haddam, Carla was the rainiest tropical cyclone in Kansas at the time, though it was later surpassed by Hurricane Paine in 1986 and Tropical Storm Frances in 1998. Severe crop damage occurred, especially in areas of Chautauqua and Shawnee Counties and to the south of the Kansas River. Many highways were left impassable due to water inundation. A family of 4 drowned after their car was swept off a road near Waverly. A fifth fatality occurred after a car with one occupant was swept into a tributary of the Marmaton River near Fort Scott. The storm persistently produced winds of 35 to 50 mph (56 to 80 km/h), causing further agricultural damage. Heavy precipitation also fell in Missouri, especially in Brookfield, Lee's Summit, and Pleasant Hill. The maximum rainfall total in Missouri was 9.34 inches (237 mm) in Concordia. One fatality was reported in Missouri. The Blue River saw record flooding in both states. The Army Corps of Engineers Kansas City District estimated flood damage along the Blue River alone at $8 million.

===== Illinois =====
The storm dropped precipitation amounts of over 7 inches (180 mm) throughout northwestern Illinois, with a peak of 8.18 inches (208 mm) in Mount Carroll. Additionally, up to 6.29 inches (160 mm) fell in 24 hours. Severe local flooding occurred, especially in the northern portions of the state. Heavy property and agricultural damage occurred. Streets and basements were reported to have flooded, while bridge approaches and a few small bridges were washed out. Precipitation of 2.5–3.5 inches (64–89 mm) in Chicago flooded about 60 viaducts and 1,000 basements. After the Chicago River rose 5 feet (1.5 m), the lock gate to Lake Michigan was opened to release excess water. The abrupt onrush of water resulted in about $75,000 in damage to boats at Wilmette Harbor.

==== Elsewhere in the United States ====
Winds in Key West reached 30 mph (48 km/h), while much of Florida reported rainfall from the outer bands of Carla.

Carla set records for rainfall associated with a tropical cyclone in Iowa and Wisconsin. Rainfall in Iowa peaked at 9.03 inches (229 mm) near Chariton, while rainfall in Wisconsin reached 7.58 inches (193 mm) in Brodhead, making Carla the wettest tropical cyclone in both states. Up to 8 inches (200 mm) of rain fell in a 12-hour period in the Lower Peninsula of Michigan, mostly between Cheboygan and Grand Rapids. However, the maximum amount actually recorded was 6.07 inches (154 mm) in Boyne Falls. Despite the rainfall, flooding in Michigan was relatively minor, limited to a washed out dam in Traverse City. Carla also spawned an F2 tornado in the state, which damaged a few homes. Damage in Michigan was estimated to be at least $55,000. Precipitation peaks in other states include 4.44 inches (113 mm) in Alabama, 5.48 inches (139 mm) in Arkansas, 6.37 inches (162 mm) in Mississippi, 5.68 inches (144 mm) in Nebraska, and 3.6 inches (91 mm) in Indiana.

=== Elsewhere ===
The remnants of Carla brought tropical storm force winds to some areas of Canada. In Ontario, gusty winds caused power outages in the Clarkson–Port Credit area. Winds up to 80 mph (130 km/h) disrupted electrical service in Saint John, New Brunswick. Winds of 57 mph (92 km/h) lashed Halifax in Nova Scotia and the Halifax Public Gardens closed for threat of falling trees and branches.

=== Tornado Outbreak ===
Carla and its remnants caused a significant tornado outbreak, spawning at least 21 tornadoes in Alabama, Louisiana, Arkansas, Texas, and Michigan. The outbreak featured 14 significant tornadoes, including an F4, one of only two violent tornadoes to be spawned by a tropical cyclone.

Confirmed tornadoes by Fujita rating
FU	F0	F1	F2	F3	F4	F5	Total
0	1	6	6	7	1	0	21

==== September 10 event ====
List of confirmed tornadoes – Sunday, September 10, 1961 (Note: Prior to 1994, damage estimates in Storm Data were given in ranges separated by powers of 10. NCEI event summaries taken from Storm Data in this period list the midpoints of those ranges, the tables below list the lower ends of those ranges.) (Note: Prior to 1994, only the average widths of tornado paths were officially listed.)
F#	Location	County / Parish	State	Start Coord.	Time (UTC)	Path length	Max width
F1	Alabama Port	Mobile	AL	35.15°N 89.92°W	20:55–?	0.5 mi (0.80 km)	10 yd (9.1 m)
F1	A waterspout moved northwestward over Mobile Bay before moving ashore, damaging two homes and a store. Losses were at least $500.						
F3	Kaplan to Cossinade	Vermilion	LA	30.00°N 92.30°W	22:50–?	5.7 mi (9.2 km)	283 yd (259 m)
F3	1 death – This intense tornado touched down just outside of Kaplan and caused heavy damage as it moved over 21 blocks of the town. A total of 21 homes were destroyed while 55 others were damaged. It moved almost due north after that, passing near the town of Cossinade before dissipating. In all, 73 homes were destroyed or extensively damaged, while 175 others received minimal damage. A total of 55 people were injured and damage exceeded $500,000.						
F1	NE of Intracoastal City	Vermilion	LA	29.8°N 92.1°W	00:09–?	2 mi (3.2 km)	100 yd (91 m)
F1	Tornado moved through sparsely populated areas, causing at least $5,000 in damage.						
F1	S of Gueydan	Vermilion	LA	29.70°N 91.20°W	00:12–?	1 mi (1.6 km)	100 yd (91 m)
F1	Tornado moved through sparsely populated areas, causing at least $5,000 in damage.						
F2	Downtown Morgan City	St. Mary	LA	29.70°N 91.20°W	04:20–?	1 mi (1.6 km)	100 yd (91 m)
F2	Approximately 55 homes were unroofed or otherwise damaged. Losses were at least $5,000 and 16 people were injured.						
F1	N of Patterson	St. Mary	LA	29.7°N 91.3°W	04:20–?	0.3 mi (0.48 km)	100 yd (91 m)
F1	Damage was at least $500.						

==== September 11 event ====
List of confirmed tornadoes – Monday, September 11, 1961
F#	Location	County / Parish	State	Start Coord.	Time (UTC)	Path length	Max width
F1	SE of Oldfield	Livingston	LA	30.6°N 90.78°W	17:10–?	3.6 mi (5.8 km)	100 yd (91 m)
F1	Tornado caused heavy tree damage with losses of at least $50,000.						
F2	Alton to N of Colt	St. Tammany	LA	30.33°N 89.77°W	17:30–?	4.3 mi (6.9 km)	100 yd (91 m)
F2	Strong tornado destroyed small homes as it moved west along the north side of Slidell. Two people were injured and damage was estimated to be at least $5,000.						
F2	Van Vleck	Matagorda	TX	29°N 95.9°W	17:47–?	0.4 mi (0.64 km)	50 yd (46 m)
F2	Several buildings were damaged and two radio towers were destroyed northeast of Bay City. No damage estimate was given.						
F0	Springfield	Tangipahoa, Livingston	LA	30.43°N 90.5°W	19:00–?	5.6 mi (9.0 km)	100 yd (91 m)
F0	Tornado moved west, passing south of Rosaryville and Pumpkin Center before crossing the Natalbany River and moving through Springfield. There was at least $5,000 in damage.						
F3	Southern Jacksonville	Cherokee	TX	31.92°N 95.28°W	19:20–?	0.1 mi (0.16 km)	10 yd (9.1 m)
F3	Four homes were damaged, including one that was destroyed. Three people were injured and losses totaled at least $5,000. Grazulis classified the tornado as an F2.						
F3	Channelview	Harris	TX	29.77°N 95.13°W	23:50–?	1 mi (1.6 km)	83 yd (76 m)
F3	Six commercial buildings and approximately 18 homes were destroyed by this intense tornado. At least 40 additional homes were damaged as well. Cars were tossed up to 100 yd (91 m). A total of 22 people were injured and losses totaled $200,000.						

==== September 12 event ====
List of confirmed tornadoes – Tuesday, September 12, 1961
F#	Location	County / Parish	State	Start Coord.	Time (UTC)	Path length	Max width
F4	Galveston (1st tornado)	Galveston	TX	29.32°N 94.78°W	09:15–?	1 mi (1.6 km)	100 yd (91 m)
F4	8 deaths – This rare, violent tornado caused widespread destruction between 19th and 25th Street. 200 buildings suffered severe damage, including 60-75 that were destroyed, although no damage estimate was given. Several homes in the path of the tornado in Galveston were leveled to the ground, but hurricane-force winds may have weakened the structures beforehand. 200 people were injured. This tornado was the first of only two violent F4 tornadoes ever spawned by a tropical cyclone with the other coming from Hurricane Hilda in 1964.						
F3	Galveston (2nd tornado)	Galveston	TX	29.27°N 94.87°W	12:00–?	2 mi (3.2 km)	10 yd (9.1 m)
F3	Strong tornado caused extensive damage to several commercial buildings and other structures and destroyed six homes, although no monetary damage value was given. Grazulis classified the tornado as an F2.						
F3	Hardin	Liberty	TX	30.15°N 94.73°W	16:30–?	0.5 mi (0.80 km)	17 yd (16 m)
F3	Six homes were damaged, although no damage value was given.						
F3	Jonesboro to Hodge	Jackson	LA	32.23°N 92.70°W	19:00–?	2 mi (3.2 km)	400 yd (370 m)
F3	5 deaths – This devastating tornado, which was the largest of the outbreak, impacted Jonesboro before reaching its peak intensity when it moved through Hodge. Approximately 75 homes were severely damaged with 20 of them being destroyed, while 115 others received minimal damage before the tornado quickly dissipated. A total of 37 people were injured and damage was estimated to be at least $50,000.						
F2	S of Taylortown, LA to Blanchard Springs, AR	Union (LA), Union (AR)	LA, AR	32.97°N 92.6°W	21:00–?	7.1 mi (11.4 km)	100 yd (91 m)
F2	Tornado caused some damage in Rum Center, Louisiana before moving into Arkansas east of Junction City, Louisiana and Junction City, Arkansas, where several homes, barns, and other structures were destroyed or otherwise damaged. Losses were estimated at $50,000.						
F3	NW of Fulbright	Red River	TX	33.57°N 95.27°W	21:45–?	0.5 mi (0.80 km)	300 yd (270 m)
F3	Several structures were impacted by this intense tornado, although no damage estimate was given. The tornado destroyed five homes. Grazulis classified the tornado as an F2.						

==== September 13 event ====
List of confirmed tornadoes – Wednesday, September 13, 1961
F#	Location	County / Parish	State	Start Coord.	Time (UTC)	Path length	Max width
F1	E of Roy	Bienville	LA	32.22°N 93.12°W	14:30–?	0.3 mi (0.48 km)	100 yd (91 m)
F1	Weak tornado occurred southeast of Castor, causing at least $50 in damage.						
F2	Acme to Williamsburg to N of Kalkaska	Grand Traverse, Kalkaska	MI	44.77°N 85.50°W	20:12–?	14.4 mi (23.2 km)	10 yd (9.1 m)
F2	Strong tornado touched down on the eastern shore of Grand Traverse Bay east of Traverse City and northeast of Fivemile Corner and moved due east. Multiple homes were damaged and numerous trees uprooted, including several cherry trees. Losses totaled at least $5,000.						
F2	Latex	Harrison	TX	32.37°N 94.10°W	23:05–?	0.1 mi (0.16 km)	10 yd (9.1 m)
F2	Two homes and three garages were damaged. Two people were injured and losses totaled $5,000.						

== Aftermath ==
In the aftermath of the hurricane, there were many injuries due to snakebites, as flooding washed thousands of snakes inland from swamps and bayous. Entomologists in Texas noted a pronounced increase in outbreaks of insects just after the passage of the storm. Infestations of southern pine beetles occurred in areas of Galveston county where trees had been damaged by Carla and other storms. Carla contributed to a small decline in overall industrial output in the United States in September 1961, breaking a 6 month streak of consecutive growth. In Texas alone, total insurance payouts from Carla reached $65 million

Shortly after the hurricane, Vice President Lyndon B. Johnson, a lifelong resident of Texas, toured the devastation in the state and met with officials from 18 different counties, remarking that "as always, Texans are arising to a challenge... We have suffered hurricane, tornado, and floods, but we in Texas are a bold and brave people." On September 16, President John F. Kennedy issued a disaster declaration for Texas, allowing all jurisdictions in the state to apply for public assistance. The president also declared 6 parishes in Louisiana disaster areas. On September 21, President Kennedy requested Congress appropriate $55 million for relief from Carla and other disasters, which was eventually included in a supplemental appropriations bill passed on September 30. This included $15 million in direct disaster relief funds, $30 million for additional loans by the Small Business Administration (SBA), and $5 million each to the Department of Agriculture (USDA) and Army Corps of Engineers for emergency conservation efforts and repairing waterways, respectively. Helicopters deployed 88 United States Marines to Galveston to patrol devastated areas. A United States Navy task force composed of medical and construction work teams was also sent to the area. Members of the United States National Guard assisted refugees in returning to their homes and worked to prevent looting. In Galveston, guardsmen shot one suspected looter and arrested 8 others. The Texas Health Department offered typhoid shots to everyone in Jefferson and Galveston counties and shipped out 400 kits of snakebite antivenom to deal with health concerns in the aftermath of the storm. The Farmers Home Administration offered emergency loans to farmers in 30 counties, with applications for aid exceeding $2.5 million by November 1961. The USDA supplied more than 1,800,000 lb (820,000 kg) of surplus food to Louisiana and Texas. The SBA and Federal Housing Administration offered loans to property owners affected by Carla, with the former approving over $6.27 million in loans by November 1961.

After flooding on the Blue River associated with Carla, the US Army Corps of Engineers studied flood mitigation plans for the Kansas City area. A flood control plan was developed by 1968 and authorized by the Flood Control Act of 1970. However, due to disagreements between the Corps of Engineers and local communities, work on the project did not begin until 1979. The project was completed in 2016.

Owing to the hurricane's intensity and destruction, the name Carla was retired after the season, and will never again be used for an Atlantic hurricane.

== See also ==
- List of Category 4 Atlantic hurricanes
- List of Texas hurricanes (1950–1979)
- Hurricane Harvey (2017) – A Category 4 hurricane that made landfall in a similar part of Texas; tied for the costliest tropical cyclone ever recorded worldwide
