= Danevang, Texas =

- unincorporated community
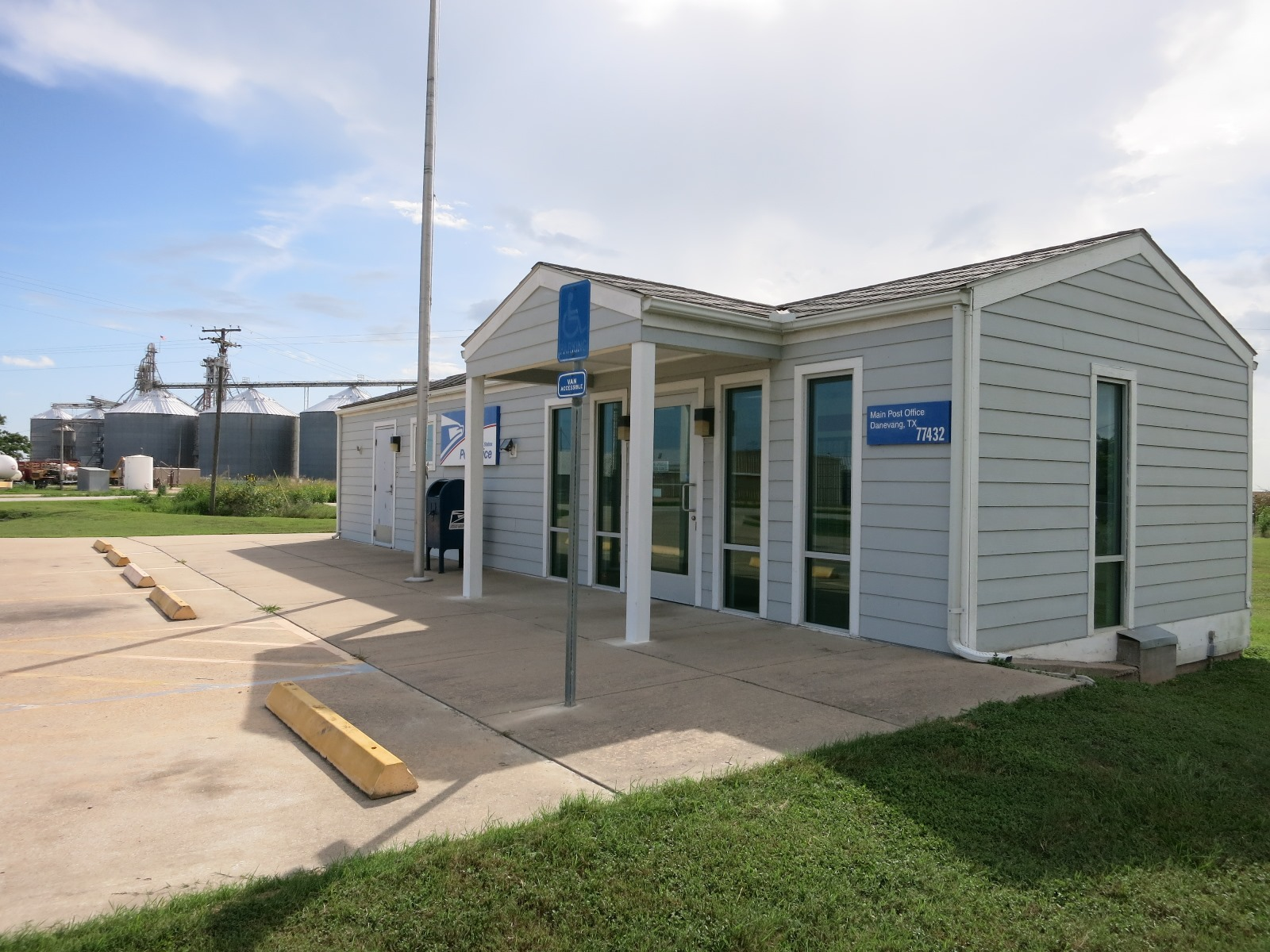
- Post Office

- Location within the state of Texas Danevang, Texas (the United States)
- Coordinates: 29°03′27″N 96°12′27″W
- Country: United States
- State: Texas
- County: Wharton

Government
- Elevation: 69 ft (21 m)
- Time zone: UTC-6 (Central (CST))
  - Summer (DST): UTC-5 (CDT)
- ZIP code: 77432
- Area code: 979
- FIPS code: 48-48481
- GNIS feature ID: 1355629

Danevang is an unincorporated community in southern Wharton County, in the U.S. state of Texas. The rural community is located south of El Campo on State Highway 71 (SH 71). The community's church was still open in 2013.

== History ==
The town was founded in 1894, mostly by Danes who migrated from the American Midwest.

An obelisk stands on the church's lawn, chronicling the community's triumphs and tragedies. Tombstones in the local cemetery are almost entirely Danish.

Danevang has been given the nickname "Danish Capital of Texas".

== Geography ==
Danevang is on SH 71 at County Road 424, a distance of 10.8 miles (17.4 km) south of El Campo and 8.5 miles (13.7 km) north of Midfield in Matagorda County. Near the crossroads are a US post office, several agricultural storage buildings, and several dwellings. The Danish Heritage Museum is 1.0 mile (1.6 km) to the south at the junction of SH 71 and FM 441. The Danevang Lutheran Church is a short distance to the east of the museum on County Road 426. Land under agriculture surrounds the homes and other buildings at the site. Danevang is also located 47 mi (76 km) south of Columbus, and 85 mi (137 km) southwest of Houston.

=== Climate ===
The climate in this area is characterized by hot, humid summers and generally mild to cool winters. According to the Köppen Climate Classification system, Danevang has a humid subtropical climate, abbreviated "Cfa" on climate maps.

Climate data for Danevang, Texas (1991–2020 normals, extremes 1896–present)
Month	Jan	Feb	Mar	Apr	May	Jun	Jul	Aug	Sep	Oct	Nov	Dec	Year
Record high °F (°C)	87 (31)	91 (33)	95 (35)	97 (36)	100 (38)	104 (40)	108 (42)	107 (42)	109 (43)	98 (37)	92 (33)	90 (32)	109 (43)
Mean maximum °F (°C)	77.6 (25.3)	80.0 (26.7)	84.0 (28.9)	88.3 (31.3)	91.5 (33.1)	95.4 (35.2)	97.5 (36.4)	99.7 (37.6)	97.0 (36.1)	92.2 (33.4)	85.6 (29.8)	79.7 (26.5)	100.5 (38.1)
Mean daily maximum °F (°C)	63.0 (17.2)	67.0 (19.4)	73.3 (22.9)	79.6 (26.4)	85.4 (29.7)	90.1 (32.3)	92.6 (33.7)	94.2 (34.6)	90.1 (32.3)	83.1 (28.4)	72.8 (22.7)	65.3 (18.5)	79.7 (26.5)
Daily mean °F (°C)	53.0 (11.7)	56.9 (13.8)	63.3 (17.4)	69.4 (20.8)	76.1 (24.5)	81.4 (27.4)	83.2 (28.4)	84.1 (28.9)	80.3 (26.8)	72.1 (22.3)	62.4 (16.9)	55.4 (13.0)	69.8 (21.0)
Mean daily minimum °F (°C)	43.0 (6.1)	46.7 (8.2)	53.4 (11.9)	59.2 (15.1)	66.8 (19.3)	72.7 (22.6)	73.8 (23.2)	74.0 (23.3)	70.4 (21.3)	61.2 (16.2)	52.0 (11.1)	45.4 (7.4)	59.9 (15.5)
Mean minimum °F (°C)	27.3 (−2.6)	31.4 (−0.3)	34.2 (1.2)	42.8 (6.0)	52.0 (11.1)	64.7 (18.2)	68.8 (20.4)	68.5 (20.3)	58.4 (14.7)	43.6 (6.4)	34.6 (1.4)	29.2 (−1.6)	24.5 (−4.2)
Record low °F (°C)	7 (−14)	3 (−16)	17 (−8)	30 (−1)	39 (4)	50 (10)	62 (17)	60 (16)	41 (5)	25 (−4)	14 (−10)	8 (−13)	3 (−16)
Average precipitation inches (mm)	3.45 (88)	2.67 (68)	3.16 (80)	2.93 (74)	4.70 (119)	4.87 (124)	3.95 (100)	4.08 (104)	5.13 (130)	4.00 (102)	4.11 (104)	3.36 (85)	46.41 (1,179)
Average snowfall inches (cm)	0.0 (0.0)	0.0 (0.0)	0.0 (0.0)	0.0 (0.0)	0.0 (0.0)	0.0 (0.0)	0.0 (0.0)	0.0 (0.0)	0.0 (0.0)	0.0 (0.0)	0.0 (0.0)	0.9 (2.3)	0.9 (2.3)
Average precipitation days (≥ 0.01 in)	8.2	7.5	6.5	5.4	6.8	8.3	7.2	7.6	8.9	6.2	6.8	7.7	87.1
Average snowy days (≥ 0.1 in)	0.0	0.0	0.0	0.0	0.0	0.0	0.0	0.0	0.0	0.0	0.0	0.1	0.1
Source: NOAA

== Education ==
Danevang's first school opened in 1895 and students were taught the Danish language and the country's history. Today, the community is served by the El Campo Independent School District.

== Notable person ==
- Heinie Kirkgard, football player, was born in Danevang.

== Media ==
- KKHA is stationed in Danevang.
