= Heinie Kirkgard =

American football player (1898–1967)

Profile
- Position: Halfback

Personal information
- Born: September 2, 1898; Danevang, Texas, U.S.
- Died: February 26, 1967 (aged 68); Dallas, U.S.
- Listed weight: 165 lb (75 kg)

Career information
- College: Centre

Career history
- Toledo Maroons (1923)

Career statistics
- Games: 5
- Stats at Pro Football Reference

Henry Gotlieb "Dutch" Kirkgard (September 2, 1898 – February 26, 1967) was an American football player. A Texas native, he was the starting left halfback for the 1922 Centre Praying Colonels football team. He also played professional football as a halfback for the Toledo Maroons in the National Football League (NFL). He appeared in five NFL games, three as a starter, during the 1923 season.
