= Oldfield, Louisiana =

Unincorporated community in Louisiana

- Unincorporated community
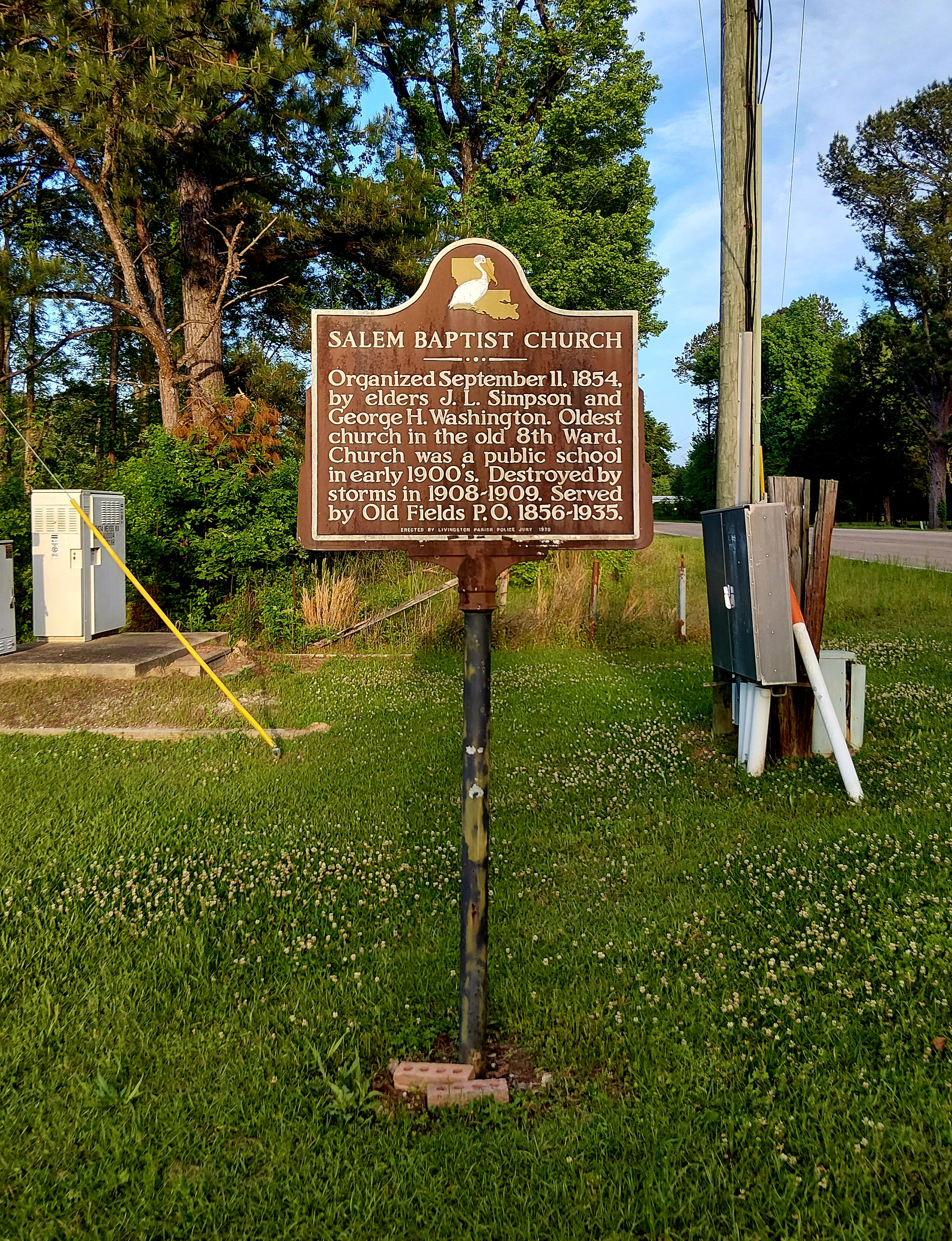
- Salem Baptist Church historical marker

- Location within Louisiana Location within the United States
- Coordinates: 30°37′29″N 90°50′40″W
- Country: United States
- State: Louisiana
- Parish: Livingston
- Elevation: 92 ft (28 m)
- Time zone: UTC-6 (Central (CST))
  - Summer (DST): UTC-5 (CDT)
- ZIP code: 70754
- Area code: 225
- GNIS feature ID: 552052
- FIPS code: 22-57695

Oldfield is an unincorporated community in Livingston Parish, Louisiana, United States. The community is located 9 miles (14 kilometres) north of Walker and 4 miles (6.4 kilometres) southeast of Baywood.

== Salem Baptist Church ==
The historic Salem Baptist Church held the first service here on Sept. 11, 1854. The original building was located near the bank of the Colyell Creek. Then sometime in 1886 a second larger building was erected on what is now the cemetery hill. Then in 1908 a tornado destroyed the church and it was rebuilt in 1909. After additional storm damage the church members decided to move the church. In March 1943, the first services were held in the new building.

== Salem Cemetery ==
The historic Salem cemetery is located here.
