= Morgan Point, Texas =

Coordinates: 29.5493959°N 94.7793642°W

Morgan Point is a cape in Chambers County, Texas.
