= KBBB (FM) =

- Bay City, Texas; United States
- Broadcast area: Central Gulf Coast
- Frequency: 102.5 MHz
- Branding: K-Bay 102.5

Programming
- Format: Adult contemporary

Ownership
- Owner: David Rowell; (Bay and Beyond Broadcasting LLC)

History
- First air date: 27 July 1984 (as KMKS at 92.1)
- Former call signs: KMKS (1984–2022)
- Former frequencies: 92.1 MHz (1984–1990)
- Call sign meaning: K - Bay and Beyond Broadcasting (company and licensee name)

Technical information
- Licensing authority: FCC
- Facility ID: 58979
- Class: C1
- ERP: 100,000 watts
- HAAT: 142 Meters
- Transmitter coordinates: 28°47′50″N 96°9′21″W

Links
- Public license information: Public file; LMS
- Website: kbbb1025.com

KBBB (102.5 FM) serves Bay City, Texas and the region south of Houston. The radio station plays an adult contemporary format interspersed with topics of regional interest, regional news and weather, local personalities, and requests and dedications. Owned by David Rowell, through licensee Bay and Beyond Broadcasting LLC, KBBB is licensed by the Federal Communications Commission to operate on 102.5 FM. The KBBB transmitter is located near Palacios, Texas. The station's call sign is only the facility's second set, having been KMKS since its sign on in 1984 until changing to the current call set in August 2022. KBBB stands for Bay and Beyond Broadcasting, and was specifically requested by the new station owner.

== History ==
Class A: Application for Construction Permit was received by the Federal Communications Commission on June 23, 1982 to operate on the assigned frequency of 92.1 MHz at 3,000 watts. The station signed on at 92.1 FM on July 27, 1984 at 2:57 pm. At that time, KMKS played Adult contemporary music. In 1997, KMKS switched its formats to country music.

Class C2: 50,000 watts: August 13, 1990, KMKS applied for a station license of its newly upgraded facility with its assigned new frequency of 102.5 kHz and 50,000 watts BPH-20030206ACK .

Class C1: 100,000 watts. KMKS filed an Application for an FM Broadcast Station License to operate as C1, 100,000 watts on July 20, 2007 (BLH-20070720ABH), which was accepted for filing by the Federal Communications Commission (FCC) on July 23, 2007. KMKS received its license to cover (BPH-20030206ACK) August 6, 2007. At that time, KMKS 102.5 FM went from 50,000 to 100,000 watts ERP with a country music format.

On August 8, 2022, KMKS changed its format back to adult contemporary as "102.5 K-Bay" under the new callsign KBBB.

== Studio location ==
Studio is located at 2309 5th Street in Bay City Texas. Mailing address is P.O. Box 789, Bay City, Texas 77404-0789
