= Bloomington High School =

Bloomington High School may refer to:

- Bloomington High School (California)
- Bloomington High School (Illinois)
- Old Bloomington High School, the previous high school building in Bloomington, Illinois
- Bloomington High School North, Indiana
- Bloomington High School South, Indiana
- Bloomington High School (Texas)
- Idt-Bloomington, Minnesota
