= Meyersville Independent School District =

School district in Texas, United States

Address
- 1897 Meyersville Road Meyersville, Texas, 77974; United States

District information
- Grades: PK-8
- Schools: 1
- NCES District ID: 4830450

Students and staff
- Students: 155
- Teachers: 11.88 (on an FTE basis)
- Student–teacher ratio: 13.05:1

Other information
- Website: www.meyersvilleisd.org

Meyersville Independent School District is a public school district based in the community of Meyersville, Texas (USA).

Located in DeWitt County, a small portion of the district extends into Victoria County.

Meyersville ISD has one school - Meyersville Elementary - that serves students in grades kindergarten through eight. Ninth through twelfth grade students attend Cuero High School in the Cuero Independent School District.

In 2009, the school district was rated "exemplary" by the Texas Education Agency.
