= Inez, Texas =

- CDP
- Location of Inez, Texas
- Coordinates: 28°52′31″N 96°47′39″W
- Country: United States
- State: Texas
- County: Victoria

Area
  - Total: 59.6 sq mi (154.3 km^{2})
  - Land: 59.5 sq mi (154.2 km^{2})
  - Water: 0.039 sq mi (0.1 km^{2})
- Elevation: 66 ft (20 m)

Population (2020)
  - Total: 2,641
  - Density: 44.36/sq mi (17.13/km^{2})
- Time zone: UTC-6 (Central (CST))
  - Summer (DST): UTC-5 (CDT)
- ZIP code: 77968
- Area code: 361
- FIPS code: 48-35996
- GNIS feature ID: 1360007

Inez (/ˈaɪnɛz/ EYE-nez) is a census-designated place (CDP), on Interstate 69/U.S. Highway 59, fifteen miles northeast of Victoria, near the Jackson County, Texas line in Victoria County, Texas, United States. As of the 2020 census, Inez had a population of 2,641. It is included in the Victoria, Texas, Metropolitan Statistical Area. The name is that of a daughter of a railroad developer.

== History ==
In the late 17th century, a French colony called Fort Saint Louis existed near Inez as part of the French claim to the area. Later the Spanish built a presidio near the former French site.

The community of Inez was originally called "Arenosa" after nearby Arenosa Creek.

In 1882, the community founded by Henry Clay Koontz, was renamed upon the arrival of the New York, Texas and Mexican Railway after the daughter of railway president Joseph Telfener.In 1900 the town had a lumberyard, a railway station, a bank, a hotel, and a Wells Fargo office. By 1920 the population reached 200.

== Geography ==
Inez is located at 28°52′31″N 96°47′39″W (28.875316, -96.794120).

According to the United States Census Bureau, the CDP has a total area of 59.6 square miles (154.3 km^{2}), of which 59.5 square miles (154.2 km^{2}) is land and 0.1 square mile (0.1 km^{2}) (0.08%) is water.

Inez is located northeast of Victoria on US Route 59 at state highway 444.

== Demographics ==
Historical population
Census	Pop.	Note	%±
1990	1,371		—
2000	1,787		30.3%
2010	2,098		17.4%
2020	2,641		25.9%
U.S. Decennial Census; 1850–1900 1910; 1920 1930 1940; 1950 1960 1970; 1980 1990 2000; 2010 2020

Inez first appeared as a census designated place in the 1990 U.S. census.

=== 2020 census ===
Inez CDP, Texas – Racial and ethnic composition Note: the US Census treats Hispanic/Latino as an ethnic category. This table excludes Latinos from the racial categories and assigns them to a separate category. Hispanics/Latinos may be of any race.
Race / Ethnicity (NH = Non-Hispanic)	Pop 2000	Pop 2010	Pop 2020	% 2000	% 2010	% 2020
White alone (NH)	1,527	1,773	2,053	85.45%	84.51%	77.74%
Black or African American alone (NH)	19	22	26	1.06%	1.05%	0.98%
Native American or Alaska Native alone (NH)	5	2	2	0.28%	0.10%	0.08%
Asian alone (NH)	7	4	8	0.39%	0.19%	0.30%
Native Hawaiian or Pacific Islander alone (NH)	0	0	1	0.00%	0.00%	0.04%
Other race alone (NH)	1	0	10	0.06%	0.00%	0.38%
Mixed race or Multiracial (NH)	15	18	88	0.84%	0.86%	3.33%
Hispanic or Latino (any race)	213	279	453	11.92%	13.30%	17.15%
Total	1,787	2,098	2,641	100.00%	100.00%	100.00%

As of the 2020 United States census, there were 2,641 people, 805 households, and 698 families residing in the CDP.

=== 2000 census ===
As of the census of 2000, there were 1,787 people, 628 households, and 503 families residing in the CDP. The population density was 30.0 inhabitants per square mile (11.6/km^{2}). There were 684 housing units at an average density of 11.5/sq mi (4.4/km^{2}). The racial makeup of the CDP was 91.55% White, 1.51% African American, 1.01% Native American, 0.39% Asian, 4.36% from other races, and 1.18% from two or more races. Hispanic or Latino of any race were 11.92% of the population.

There were 628 households, out of which 43.8% had children under the age of 18 living with them, 69.7% were married couples living together, 6.8% had a female householder with no husband present, and 19.9% were non-families. 18.6% of all households were made up of individuals, and 7.8% had someone living alone who was 65 years of age or older. The average household size was 2.85 and the average family size was 3.25.

In the CDP, the population was spread out, with 31.2% under the age of 18, 6.9% from 18 to 24, 30.9% from 25 to 44, 22.0% from 45 to 64, and 9.0% who were 65 years of age or older. The median age was 35 years. For every 100 females, there were 102.8 males. For every 100 females age 18 and over, there were 101.8 males.

The median income for a household in the CDP was $50,000, and the median income for a family was $56,806. Males had a median income of $35,926 versus $22,050 for females. The per capita income for the CDP was $18,487. About 2.6% of families and 4.0% of the population were below the poverty line, including 3.7% of those under age 18 and 10.1% of those age 65 or over.

== Education ==
Most of Inez CDP is within the Industrial Independent School District, home of the Cobras.

Portions are in the Victoria Independent School District.

All of the county is in the service area of Victoria College.
