= Telferner, Texas =

Unincorporated community in Texas, US

Telferner is an unincorporated community in Victoria County, Texas, United States. According to the Handbook of Texas, the community had an estimated population of 700 in 2000. It is part of the Victoria, Texas, Metropolitan Statistical Area.

== Geography ==
Telferner is located at 28°50′56″N 96°53′26″W (28.8488772, -96.8905395). It is situated at the junction of U.S. Highway 59 and FM 1686, approximately eight miles northeast of Victoria.

== History ==
The community was established in 1882, when the New York, Texas and Mexican Railway from Victoria to Rosenberg was completed. The station was located on John N. Keeran's California Ranch. A post office opened at the site in 1895 under the name Keeran. In 1908, the community was renamed Jasmine. Soon after, the name was changed again to Telferner, after Italian count Joseph Telferner, who was the president and one of the builders of the New York, Texas and Mexican Railway. By 1904, Telferner was home to roughly 100 residents, with five stores, a gin, and a lumberyard. Despite the discovery of an oilfield in the area, the population declined substantially over the following years. By 1985, however, it had rebounded to around 300. That figure had risen to 700 by 2000.

Telferner has a post office with the ZIP code 77988.

== Education ==
Public education in the community of Telferner is provided by the Victoria Independent School District.
