= Victoria County, Texas =

County in Texas, United States

- County
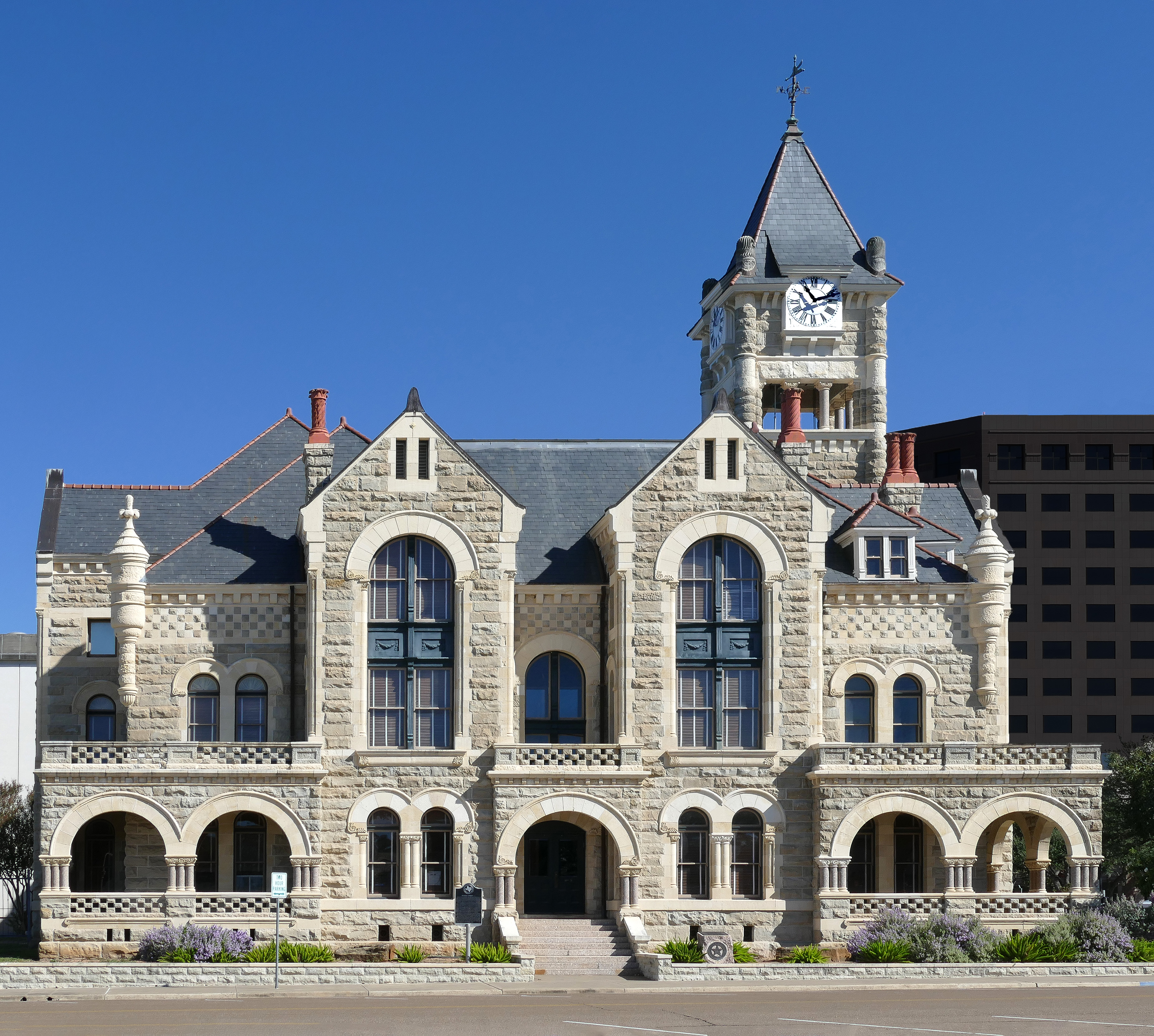
- The Victoria County Courthouse of Romanesque revival design in Victoria

- Location within the U.S. state of Texas
- Coordinates: 28°48′N 96°58′W
- Country: United States
- State: Texas
- Founded: 1836
- Named for: Guadalupe Victoria
- Seat: Victoria
- Largest city: Victoria

Area
  - Total: 889 sq mi (2,300 km^{2})
  - Land: 882 sq mi (2,280 km^{2})
  - Water: 6.7 sq mi (17 km^{2}) 0.8%

Population (2020)
  - Total: 91,319
  - Estimate (2025): 92,656 ▲
  - Density: 104/sq mi (40.0/km^{2})
- Time zone: UTC−6 (Central)
  - Summer (DST): UTC−5 (CDT)
- Congressional district: 27th
- Website: victoriacountytx.gov

Victoria County is a county located in the U.S. state of Texas. As of the 2020 census, its population was 91,319. Its county seat is also named Victoria. Victoria County is included in the Victoria metropolitan statistical area, and comprises the entirety of the Victoria media market in Texas.

== History ==
=== Through colonial times ===
Paleo-Indian hunter-gatherers, and later Tonkawa, Aranamas, Tamiques, and Karankawa, inhabited the area before the time of European contact. Tawakoni, Lipan Apache, and Comanche were later inhabitants of modern-day Victoria County.

In 1685, René-Robert Cavelier, Sieur de La Salle established Fort St. Louis.

In 1689, Alonso de Leon named the Guadalupe River in honor of Our Lady of Guadalupe.

In 1722, Nuestra Señora de Loreto Presidio and Mission Nuestra Señora del Espíritu Santo de Zúñiga became the first Spanish settlement in Victoria County.

In 1824, Nuestra Señora de Guadalupe de Jesús Victoria (the future city of Victoria) was established by Martín De León, who started his colony with 5,000 branded cattle and established the county's claim as the "Cradle of the Texas Cattle Industry." It was the only primarily Mexican colony in Texas.

In 1835, Victoria's settlers supported the revolution against Antonio López de Santa Anna, but were ostracized by new incoming Americans, many of whom were adventurous soldiers or fortune hunters, who wrongly profiled them as Mexican sympathizers and forced them to flee after the revolution in 1836. Anglo-Americans resettled the area.

In 1836, Victory County was formed by the Republic of Texas. It is named after Guadalupe Victoria, the first President of Mexico. About 3000 troops of the Texas Army encamped near Spring Creek, Victoria County, under the command of Gen. Thomas J. Rusk, as the main defense against a threatened attack by Mexican General José de Urrea.

In 1842, Rafael Vásquez and Adrián Woll led Mexican forces in an invasion into the county.

=== After the Revolution through the Civil War ===
In 1850, Coletoville was established by German immigrant Carl Steiner. The next year, Victoria County's first toll bridge was erected across the river, built by Richard Owens and Sylvester Sutton.

As of 1860, 1,413 slaves were in the county. In 1861, county residents voted 318–88 in favor of secession from the Union. Victoria County sent 300 men to fight for the Confederate States Army. Confederate General John B. Magruder destroyed the railroad from Port Lavaca to Victoria in 1863 to keep it out of Union hands. He also sank trees and boats into the Guadalupe River.

From 1867-1869, the county was occupied by federal troops. Mob violence by those same troops resulted in the axing death and corpse mutilation of local official Benjamin F. Hill, who at the time was incarcerated for an alleged self-defense killing of a discharged Union soldier.

The Gulf, Western Texas and Pacific Railway connect Victoria with Cuero and the coast in 1873. The New York, Texas and Mexican Railway provided the first cross-country route to Rosenberg Junction in Fort Bend County in 1882.

That next year, the Texas Continental Meat Company was erected in the county and was the largest meat packing plant in Texas. Bray's Ferry was established in 1886 at the San Antonio River by G. B. Amery and John Bray. Twenty years later, the Guadalupe River Navigation Company was established.

By 1930, when oil was discovered at the McFaddin Oil Field, Victoria County held more cattle than any other county in Texas. Foster Air Force Base was established as Victoria Army Air Field as a training air field in 1941. The Victoria Barge Canal was completed in 1967, connecting Victoria County with the Intracoastal Waterway.

== Demographics ==
Historical population
Census	Pop.	Note	%±
1850	2,019		—
1860	4,171		106.6%
1870	4,860		16.5%
1880	6,289		29.4%
1890	8,737		38.9%
1900	13,678		56.6%
1910	14,990		9.6%
1920	18,271		21.9%
1930	20,048		9.7%
1940	23,741		18.4%
1950	31,241		31.6%
1960	46,475		48.8%
1970	53,766		15.7%
1980	68,807		28.0%
1990	74,361		8.1%
2000	84,088		13.1%
2010	86,793		3.2%
2020	91,319		5.2%
2025 (est.)	92,656	▲	1.5%
U.S. Decennial Census; 1850–2010 2010–2014

=== 2020 census ===
As of the 2020 census, the county had a population of 91,319, 34,451 households, and 22,172 families residing in the county.

The median age was 37.7 years, with 24.7% of residents under the age of 18 and 17.3% of residents 65 years of age or older. For every 100 females there were 95.6 males, and for every 100 females age 18 and over there were 93.0 males.

The racial makeup of the county was 58.1% White, 6.3% Black or African American, 0.8% American Indian and Alaska Native, 1.6% Asian, <0.1% Native Hawaiian and Pacific Islander, 13.0% from some other race, and 20.2% from two or more races. Hispanic or Latino residents of any race comprised 47.0% of the population.

72.3% of residents lived in urban areas, while 27.7% lived in rural areas.

There were 34,451 households in the county, of which 33.3% had children under the age of 18 living in them. Of all households, 47.9% were married-couple households, 18.2% were households with a male householder and no spouse or partner present, and 26.8% were households with a female householder and no spouse or partner present. About 25.7% of all households were made up of individuals and 10.8% had someone living alone who was 65 years of age or older.

There were 38,958 housing units, of which 11.6% were vacant. Among occupied housing units, 64.5% were owner-occupied and 35.5% were renter-occupied. The homeowner vacancy rate was 1.7% and the rental vacancy rate was 13.9%.

=== Racial and ethnic composition ===
Victoria County, Texas – Racial and ethnic composition Note: the US Census treats Hispanic/Latino as an ethnic category. This table excludes Latinos from the racial categories and assigns them to a separate category. Hispanics/Latinos may be of any race.
Race / Ethnicity (NH = Non-Hispanic)	Pop 1980	Pop 1990	Pop 2000	Pop 2010	Pop 2020	% 1980	% 1990	% 2000	% 2010	% 2020
White alone (NH)	42,815	43,835	44,490	41,564	39,330	62.22%	58.95%	52.91%	47.89%	43.07%
Black or African American alone (NH)	4,619	4,638	5,137	5,190	5,230	6.71%	6.24%	6.11%	5.98%	5.73%
Native American or Alaska Native alone (NH)	137	141	197	199	214	0.20%	0.19%	0.23%	0.23%	0.23%
Asian alone (NH)	176	225	635	860	1,391	0.26%	0.30%	0.76%	0.99%	1.52%
Native Hawaiian or Pacific Islander alone (NH)	x	x	9	16	35	x	x	0.01%	0.02%	0.04%
Other race alone (NH)	116	150	39	109	232	0.17%	0.20%	0.05%	0.13%	0.25%
Mixed race or Multiracial (NH)	x	x	622	742	1,956	x	x	0.74%	0.85%	2.14%
Hispanic or Latino (any race)	20,944	25,372	32,959	38,113	42,931	30.44%	34.12%	39.20%	43.91%	47.01%
Total	68,807	74,361	84,088	86,793	91,319	100.00%	100.00%	100.00%	100.00%	100.00%

=== 2000 census ===
As of the 2000 census, 84,088 people, 30,071 households, and 22,192 families lived in the county. The population density was 95 people per square mile (37 people/km^{2}). The 32,945 housing units had an average density of 37 units per square mile (14 units/km^{2}). The racial makeup of the county was 74.22% White, 6.30% Black or African American, 0.53% Native American, 0.77% Asian, 0.04% Pacific Islander, 15.92% from other races, and 2.22% from two or more races. About 39.20% of the population were Hispanic or Latino of any race; 16.2% were of German, 6.2% American, and 5.6% English ancestry according to Census 2000, and 73.3% spoke English and 25.5% Spanish as their first language.

Of the 30,071 households, 37.2% had children under 18 living with them, 56.7% were married couples living together, 12.7% had a female householder with no husband present, and 26.2% were not families. Around 22.4% of all households were made up of individuals, and 9.1% had someone living alone who was 65 or older. The average household size was 2.75 and the average family size was 3.23.

In the county, the age distribution was 29.1% under 18, 9.2% from 18 to 24, 28.1% from 25 to 44, 21.5% from 45 to 64, and 12.0% who were 65 or older. The median age was 34 years. For every 100 females, there were 94.9 males. For every 100 females 18 and over, there were 91.7 males.

The median income for a household in the county was $38,732, and for a family was $44,443. Males had a median income of $35,484 versus $21,231 for females. The per capita income for the county was $18,379. About 10.50% of families and 12.90% of the population were below the poverty line, including 17.20% of those under 18 and 11.70% of those 65 or over.

== Geography ==
According to the U.S. Census Bureau, the county has a total area of 889 square miles (2,300 km^{2}), of which 6.7 square miles (17 km^{2}) (0.8%) are covered by water.

=== Major highways ===
- Future I-69
- Future I-69W
- Future I-69E
- US 59
- US 77
- US 87
- SH 185
- Spur 91
- Loop 463

=== Adjacent counties ===
- Lavaca County (north)
- Jackson County (northeast)
- Calhoun County (southeast)
- Refugio County (south)
- Goliad County (southwest)
- DeWitt County (northwest)

== Politics ==
=== County government ===
==== Victoria County elected officials ====
Position	Name	Party
County Judge	Ben Zeller	Republican
Commissioner, Precinct 1	Danny Garcia	Democratic
Commissioner, Precinct 2	Kevin M. Janak	Republican
Commissioner, Precinct 3	Gary Burns	Republican
Commissioner, Precinct 4	Clint Ives	Republican

United States presidential election results for Victoria County, Texas
Year	Republican		Democratic		Third party(ies)	
Year	No.	%	No.	%	No.	%
1912	100	9.90%	687	68.02%	223	22.08%
1916	476	33.66%	897	63.44%	41	2.90%
1920	782	41.62%	686	36.51%	411	21.87%
1924	459	18.98%	1,653	68.36%	306	12.66%
1928	663	27.94%	1,710	72.06%	0	0.00%
1932	190	6.39%	2,777	93.44%	5	0.17%
1936	352	14.46%	2,081	85.46%	2	0.08%
1940	956	27.70%	2,493	72.24%	2	0.06%
1944	936	25.41%	2,331	63.27%	417	11.32%
1948	1,262	31.22%	2,435	60.24%	345	8.54%
1952	4,306	57.89%	3,128	42.05%	4	0.05%
1956	5,596	62.85%	3,280	36.84%	28	0.31%
1960	4,591	44.16%	5,779	55.58%	27	0.26%
1964	4,201	33.97%	8,141	65.83%	25	0.20%
1968	6,352	43.12%	6,042	41.02%	2,336	15.86%
1972	11,246	72.56%	4,226	27.27%	26	0.17%
1976	9,594	56.34%	7,326	43.02%	108	0.63%
1980	13,392	62.96%	7,382	34.71%	495	2.33%
1984	18,787	72.41%	7,037	27.12%	121	0.47%
1988	15,056	62.08%	8,923	36.79%	274	1.13%
1992	13,086	50.26%	7,604	29.20%	5,347	20.54%
1996	14,457	59.94%	8,238	34.16%	1,424	5.90%
2000	18,787	68.55%	8,176	29.83%	445	1.62%
2004	20,875	70.52%	8,553	28.89%	174	0.59%
2008	19,878	66.22%	9,832	32.75%	310	1.03%
2012	19,692	68.25%	8,802	30.51%	359	1.24%
2016	21,275	67.92%	8,866	28.30%	1,183	3.78%
2020	23,358	68.25%	10,380	30.33%	488	1.43%
2024	25,010	70.82%	9,998	28.31%	307	0.87%

United States Senate election results for Victoria County, Texas1
Year	Republican		Democratic		Third party(ies)	
Year	No.	%	No.	%	No.	%
2024	24,002	68.90%	10,176	29.21%	657	1.89%

United States Senate election results for Victoria County, Texas2
Year	Republican		Democratic		Third party(ies)	
Year	No.	%	No.	%	No.	%
2020	23,144	68.69%	9,834	29.19%	714	2.12%

Texas Gubernatorial election results for Victoria County
Year	Republican		Democratic		Third party(ies)	
Year	No.	%	No.	%	No.	%
2022	18,519	73.23%	6,452	25.51%	317	1.25%

== Communities ==
=== City ===
- Victoria (county seat)

=== Census-designated places ===
- Bloomington
- Inez
- Placedo
- Quail Creek

=== Unincorporated communities ===
- McFaddin
- Moursund
- Nursery
- Telferner
- Wood Hi

== Education ==
School districts include:

- Bloomington Independent School District
- Industrial Independent School District
- Meyersville Independent School District
- Nursery Independent School District
- Refugio Independent School District
- Victoria Independent School District

All of the county is in the service area of Victoria College.

Texas A&M University–Victoria is in Victoria.

== See also ==
- Kentucky Mutt Creek
- List of museums in the Texas Gulf Coast
- National Register of Historic Places listings in Victoria County, Texas
- Recorded Texas Historic Landmarks in Victoria County
