= Meyersville, Texas =

- Unincorporated community
- Location within the state of Texas Meyersville (the United States)
- Coordinates: 28°55′42″N 97°18′45″W
- Country: United States
- State: Texas
- County: DeWitt
- Time zone: UTC-6 (Central (CST))
  - Summer (DST): UTC-5 (CDT)
- ZIP code: 77974
- Area code: 361

Meyersville is an unincorporated community in DeWitt County, Texas, United States.

== History ==
The first settlement at Meyersville was made in 1846 by Adolph Meyer, who gave the town his name. The community was originally built up chiefly by Germans. A post office was established at Meyersville in 1851. The Pakebusch Family Reunion is held annually in Meyersville on the first Saturday in August.

== Education ==
The Meyersville Independent School District serves area students in grades pre-kindergarten through eight. Ninth through twelfth grade students attend Cuero High School in the Cuero Independent School District.
