= Moursund, Texas =

Unincorporated community in Texas, US

Moursund is an unincorporated community in Victoria County, Texas, United States.

== History ==
On early maps of Victoria County, Moursund appears as Craig, Texas.

Moursund is entered in the USGS Geographic Names Information System (GNIS) as a "Populated Place" in Victoria County.

== Geography ==
Moursund is situated north on U.S. Highway 87, approximately 8.5 miles north of downtown Victoria, or approximately 2.5 miles south of Nursery.

Moursund is located at 28°53′11″N 97°03′28″W (28.8863749, -97.0577653).
