= Breeden-Runge Wholesale Grocery Company Building =

- U.S. National Register of Historic Places
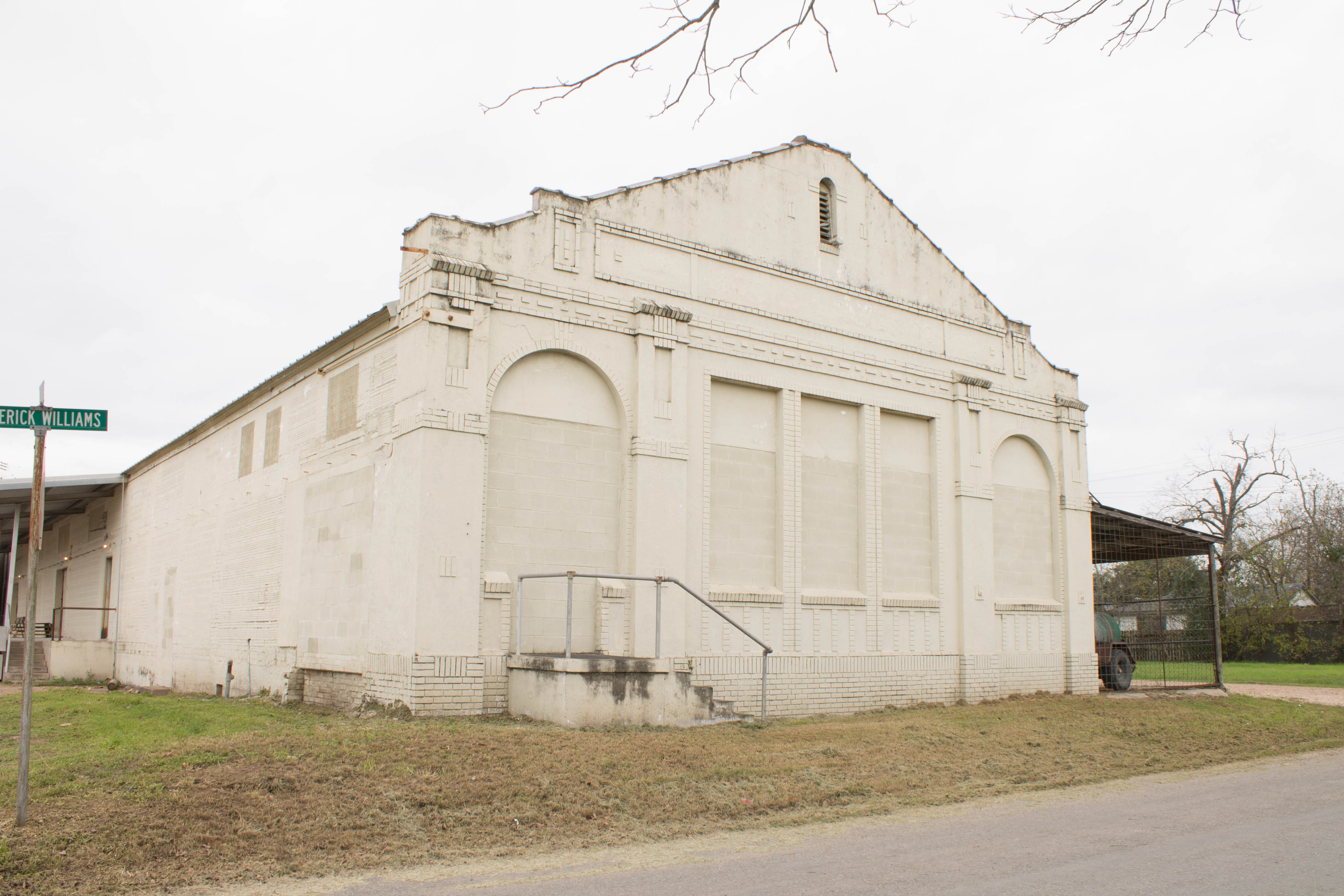
- Breeden-Runge Building in 2015

- Location within Texas Location within the United States
- Location: 108 N. Frederick William; Cuero, Texas
- Coordinates: 29°5′32″N 97°17′43″W
- Area: less than one acre
- Built: 1911
- Architect: Jules Leffland
- MPS: Cuero MRA
- NRHP reference No.: 88001957
- Added to NRHP: October 31, 1988

The Breeden-Runge Wholesale Grocery Company Building at 108 N. Frederick William St. in Cuero, Texas is a brick building that was built in 1911. It served as a warehouse for the firm which was founded in 1911 with a capital stock of $85,000.

It was designed by architect Jules Leffland. The building was listed on the National Register of Historic Places in 1988.

== See also ==
- National Register of Historic Places listings in DeWitt County, Texas
