= Nursery Independent School District =

School district in Texas, United States

Address
- 13254 Nursery Drive Victoria, Texas, 77904; United States

District information
- Grades: PK–5
- Schools: 1
- NCES District ID: 4833270

Students and staff
- Students: 137 (2023–2024)
- Teachers: 12.00 (on an FTE basis)
- Student–teacher ratio: 11.42:1

Other information
- Website: www.nurseryisd.org

Nursery Independent School District is a public school district based in the community of Nursery, Texas (USA).

The district has one school - Nursery Elementary - that serves students in grades kindergarten through five.

Middle and high school students attend the neighboring districts of Cuero ISD and Victoria ISD.

== History ==
Circa 1983 there was a legal case that explored whether a Victoria County commissioner was right in giving assistance to Nursery ISD.

In 2003 the students had Texas Assessment of Knowledge and Skills (TAKS) benchmark test scores above the state average.

In 2009, the school district was rated "recognized" by the Texas Education Agency.

Suzanne Bell, who was both principal and superintendent, stated in 2013 that having fewer benchmark tests helped students normalize testing versus seeing it as stressful.
