= Bloomington, Texas =

Bloomington
- Census-designated place
- Location of Bloomington, Texas
- Coordinates: 28°38′48″N 96°53′48″W
- Country: United States
- State: Texas
- County: Victoria

Area
  - Total: 2.7 sq mi (6.9 km^{2})
  - Land: 2.7 sq mi (6.9 km^{2})
  - Water: 0 sq mi (0.0 km^{2})
- Elevation: 59 ft (18 m)

Population (2020)
  - Total: 2,082
  - Density: 780/sq mi (300/km^{2})
- Time zone: UTC-6 (Central (CST))
  - Summer (DST): UTC-5 (CDT)
- ZIP code: 77951
- Area code: 361
- FIPS code: 48-08800
- GNIS feature ID: 1352429

Bloomington is a census-designated place (CDP) in Victoria County, Texas, United States. As of the 2020 census, Bloomington had a population of 2,082. It is included in the Victoria, Texas Metropolitan Statistical Area.

== Geography ==
Bloomington is located at 28°38′48″N 96°53′48″W (28.646639, -96.896556). According to the United States Census Bureau, the CDP has a total area of 2.7 square miles (6.9 km^{2}), all land.

== Demographics ==
Historical population
Census	Pop.	Note	%±
1960	1,756		—
1970	1,676		−4.6%
1980	1,884		12.4%
1990	1,888		0.2%
2000	2,562		35.7%
2010	2,459		−4.0%
2020	2,082		−15.3%
U.S. Decennial Census; 1850–1900 1910; 1920 1930 1940; 1950 1960 1970; 1980 1990 2000; 2010 2020

Bloomington first appeared as an unincorporated community in the 1960 U.S. census and as a census designated place in the 1980 United States census.

=== 2020 census ===
Bloomington CDP, Texas – Racial and ethnic composition Note: the US Census treats Hispanic/Latino as an ethnic category. This table excludes Latinos from the racial categories and assigns them to a separate category. Hispanics/Latinos may be of any race.
Race / Ethnicity (NH = Non-Hispanic)	Pop 2000	Pop 2010	Pop 2020	% 2000	% 2010	% 2020
White alone (NH)	635	477	343	24.79%	19.40%	16.47%
Black or African American alone (NH)	161	127	95	6.28%	5.16%	4.56%
Native American or Alaska Native alone (NH)	7	9	2	0.27%	0.37%	0.10%
Asian alone (NH)	2	2	3	0.08%	0.08%	0.14%
Native Hawaiian or Pacific Islander alone (NH)	0	0	0	0.00%	0.00%	0.00%
Other race alone (NH)	1	1	7	0.04%	0.04%	0.34%
Mixed race or Multiracial (NH)	25	13	22	0.98%	0.53%	1.06%
Hispanic or Latino (any race)	1,731	1,830	1,610	67.56%	74.42%	77.33%
Total	2,562	2,459	2,082	100.00%	100.00%	100.00%

As of the 2020 United States census, there were 2,082 people, 478 households, and 352 families residing in the CDP.

=== 2000 census ===
As of the census of 2000, 2,562 people, 771 households, and 616 families resided in the CDP. The population density was 961.4 inhabitants per square mile (371.2/km^{2}). There were 921 housing units at an average density of 345.6 per square mile (133.4/km^{2}). The racial makeup of the CDP was 53.08% White, 6.28% African American, 0.66% Native American, 0.08% Asian, 0.20% Pacific Islander, 36.46% from other races, and 3.24% from two or more races. Hispanics or Latinos of any race were 67.56% of the population.

Of the 771 households, 46.6% had children under the age of 18 living with them, 62.8% were married couples living together, 11.4% had a female householder with no husband present, and 20.1% were not families. About 17.4% of all households were made up of individuals, and 6.9% had someone living alone who was 65 years of age or older. The average household size was 3.32 and the average family size was 3.77.

In the CDP, the population was distributed as 37.1% under the age of 18, 10.5% from 18 to 24, 27.2% from 25 to 44, 16.4% from 45 to 64, and 8.9% who were 65 years of age or older. The median age was 27 years. For every 100 females, there were 96.2 males. For every 100 females age 18 and over, there were 92.4 males.

The median income for a household in the CDP was $30,167, and for a family was $34,398. Males had a median income of $36,318 versus $18,500 for females. The per capita income for the CDP was $10,332. About 16.2% of families and 20.4% of the population were below the poverty line, including 19.8% of those under age 18 and 12.8% of those age 65 or over.

== Notable people ==
Gale Storm, singer and actress, whose career was chiefly in the 1940s and 1950s.

== Education ==
Bloomington is served by the Bloomington Independent School District.

All of the county is in the service area of Victoria College.
