= Cuero Commercial Historic District =

Historic district in Texas, United States

- U.S. National Register of Historic Places
- U.S. Historic district
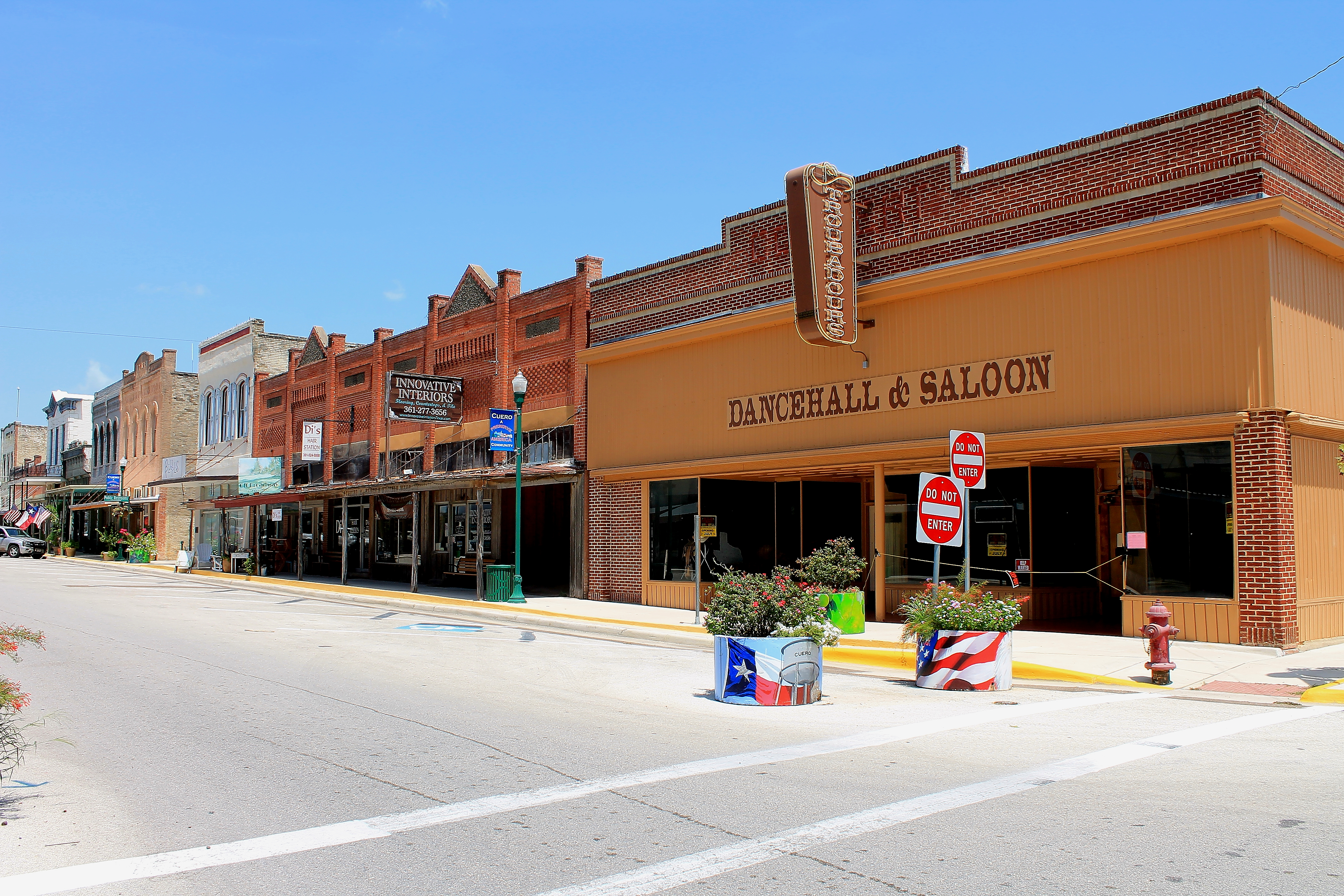
- Historic district street scene

- Location within Texas Location within the United States
- Location: Roughly bounded by Gonzales, Main, Terrell and Courthouse, Cuero, Texas
- Coordinates: 29°5′28″N 97°17′27″W
- Area: 21 acres (8.5 ha)
- Built: 1873
- Architect: Jules Leffland
- Architectural style: Renaissance, Romanesque, Classical Revival
- MPS: Cuero MRA
- NRHP reference No.: 88001996
- Added to NRHP: November 17, 1988

The Cuero Commercial Historic District in Cuero, Texas is a 21-acre (8.5 ha) historic district that was listed on the National Register of Historic Places in 1988. It includes multiple works of architect Jules Leffland. The listing included 59 contributing buildings.

== See also ==
- National Register of Historic Places listings in DeWitt County, Texas
