= First Methodist Church (Cuero, Texas) =

Historic church in Texas, United States

- U.S. National Register of Historic Places
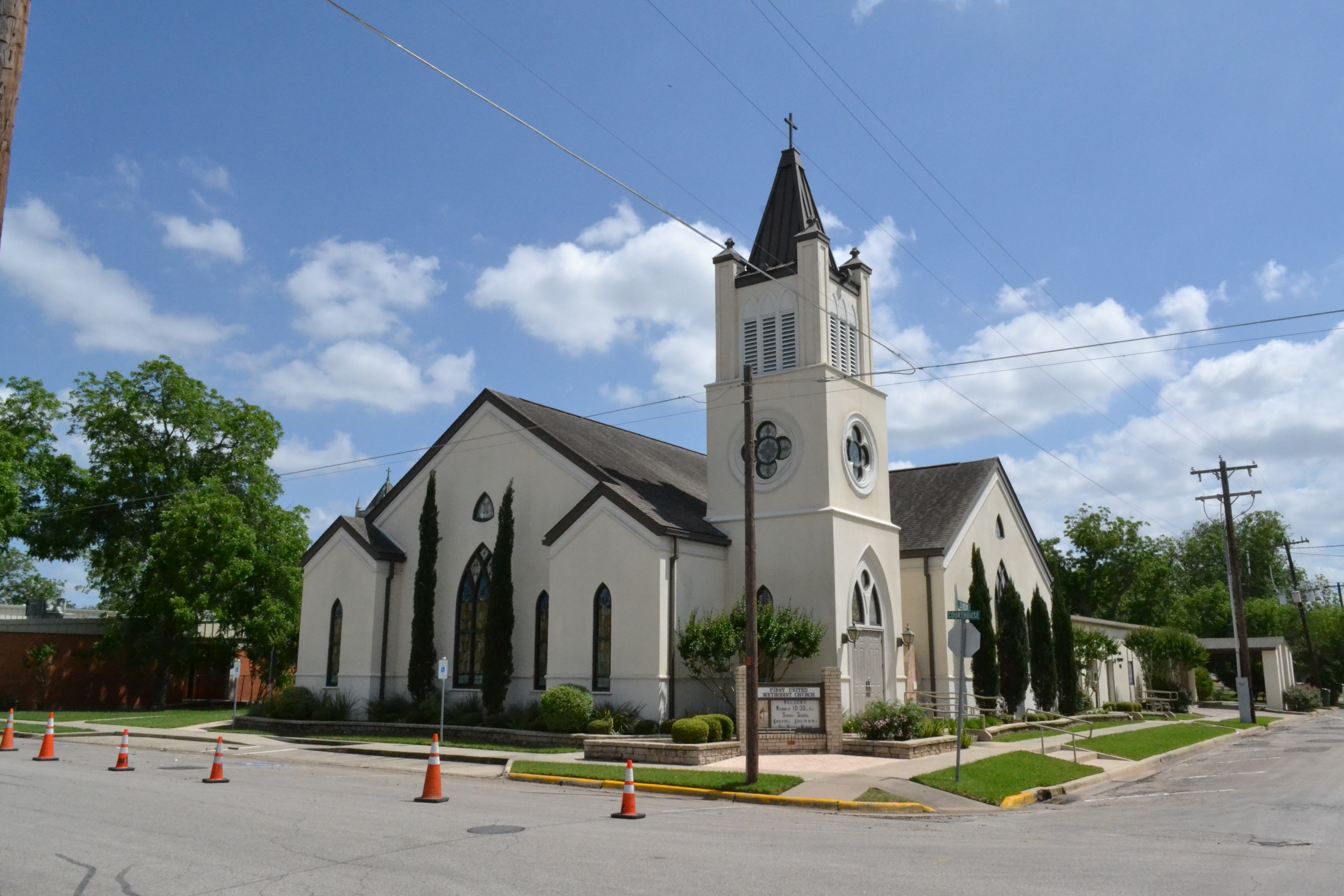
- First Methodist Church in 2014

- Location within Texas Location within the United States
- Location: 301 E. Courthouse, Cuero, Texas
- Coordinates: 29°5′27″N 97°17′17″W
- Area: less than one acre
- Built: 1886
- Architect: Z.A. Finck
- Architectural style: Gothic Revival
- MPS: Cuero MRA
- NRHP reference No.: 88001952
- Added to NRHP: October 31, 1988

First Methodist Church is a historic church at 301 E. Courthouse in Cuero, Texas.

It was built in 1886 and added to the National Register of Historic Places in 1988.

== See also ==
- National Register of Historic Places listings in DeWitt County, Texas
