= Wood Hi, Texas =

Wood Hi
- Unincorporated community
- Interactive map of Wood Hi
- Location within Texas Wood Hi (the United States)
- Coordinates: 28°47′40″N 96°50′30″W
- Country: United States
- State: Texas
- County: Victoria County
- Postal code: 77905

Wood Hi is a populated, unincorporated place in Victoria County, Texas, United States, located on Farm Road 1686, 66 feet (20 meters) above sea level.

== History ==
The community is named after the locally famous rancher William A. Wood, whose land the settlement grew up around in the 20th century. In 1918, a school, now called the William Wood Elementary School, was built upon the land in which William Wood had donated, and by 1963, several amenities had been built in Wood Hi, including a school, a gin, a grocery store, and farm houses. In 1985 through 2000 the population remains stagnant at 35.

== Natural resources ==
The area where the community resides is abundant in livestock, agricultural resources such as cotton, corn, and grains, as well as oil and gas.
