= Macedonia Baptist Church (Cuero, Texas) =

Historic church in Texas, United States

- U.S. National Register of Historic Places
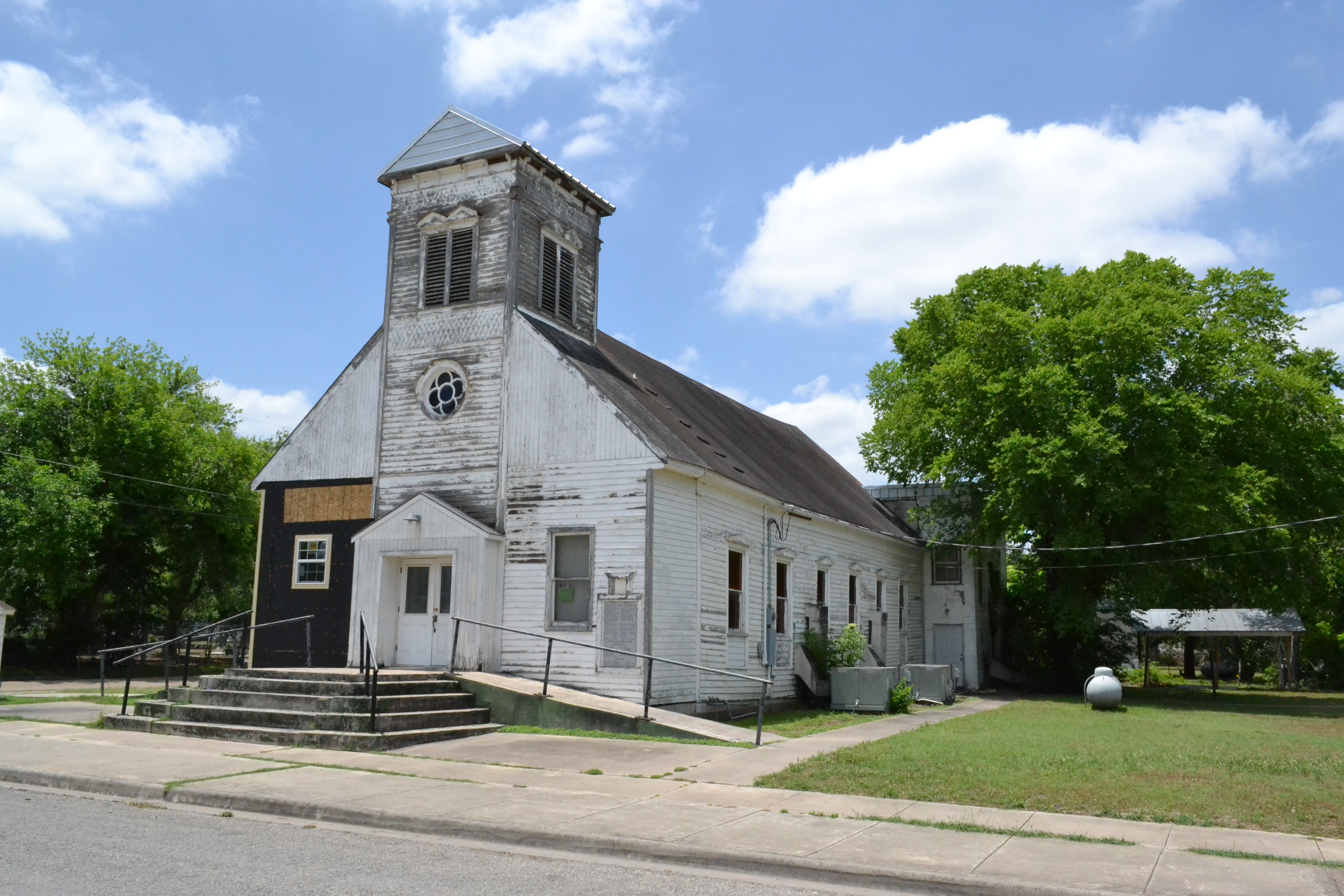
- Macedonia Baptist Church in 2014

- Location within Texas Location within the United States
- Location: 512 S. Indianola, Cuero, Texas
- Coordinates: 29°5′12″N 97°17′54″W
- Area: less than one acre
- Built: 1890
- MPS: Cuero MRA
- NRHP reference No.: 88001967
- Added to NRHP: October 31, 1988

Macedonia Baptist Church is a historic church at 512 S. Indianola in Cuero, Texas.

It was built in 1890 and added to the National Register of Historic Places in 1988.

== See also ==
- National Register of Historic Places listings in DeWitt County, Texas
