= Quail Creek, Texas =

- CDP
- Interactive map of Quail Creek, Texas
- Coordinates: 28°46′38″N 97°5′5″W
- Country: United States
- State: Texas
- County: Victoria

Area
  - Total: 3.1 sq mi (8.0 km^{2})
  - Land: 3.1 sq mi (8.0 km^{2})
  - Water: 0 sq mi (0.0 km^{2})

Population (2010)
  - Total: 1,628
  - Density: 530/sq mi (200/km^{2})
- Time zone: UTC-6 (Central (CST))
  - Summer (DST): UTC-5 (CDT)
- Zip Code: 77905

Quail Creek is a census-designated place (CDP) in Victoria County, Texas, United States. It was first listed as a CDP for the 2010 census. As of the 2020 census, Quail Creek had a population of 1,800.

== Geography ==
Quail Creek is located at 28°46′38″N 97°5′5″W (28.777323, -97.084815). The CDP has a total area of 3.1 square miles (8.0 km^{2}), all land.

== Demographics ==
Historical population
Census	Pop.	Note	%±
2010	1,628		—
2020	1,800		10.6%
U.S. Decennial Census; 1850–1900 1910; 1920 1930 1940; 1950 1960 1970; 1980 1990 2000; 2010

Quail Creek first appeared as a census designated place in the 2010 U.S. census.

=== 2020 census ===
Quail Creek CDP, Texas – Racial and ethnic composition Note: the US Census treats Hispanic/Latino as an ethnic category. This table excludes Latinos from the racial categories and assigns them to a separate category. Hispanics/Latinos may be of any race.
Race / Ethnicity (NH = Non-Hispanic)	Pop 2010	Pop 2020	% 2010	% 2020
White alone (NH)	1,023	1,013	62.84%	56.28%
Black or African American alone (NH)	65	57	3.99%	3.17%
Native American or Alaska Native alone (NH)	2	2	0.12%	0.11%
Asian alone (NH)	4	6	0.25%	0.33%
Native Hawaiian or Pacific Islander alone (NH)	0	1	0.00%	0.06%
Other race alone (NH)	5	1	0.31%	0.06%
Mixed race or Multiracial (NH)	7	50	0.43%	2.78%
Hispanic or Latino (any race)	522	670	32.06%	37.22%
Total	1,628	1,800	100.00%	100.00%

== Education ==
It is in the Victoria Independent School District.

All of the county is in the service area of Victoria College.
