= Arenosa Creek =

Stream in Victoria and Jackson County, Texas, U.S.

Coordinates: 28°49′32.1″N 96°43′08.3″W

Arenosa Creek is a stream in Victoria County and Jackson County, Texas, in the United States.

Arenosa is the Spanish word for "sandy".

== See also ==
- List of rivers of Texas
