= Grace Episcopal Church (Cuero, Texas) =

Historic church in Texas, United States

- U.S. National Register of Historic Places
- Recorded Texas Historic Landmark
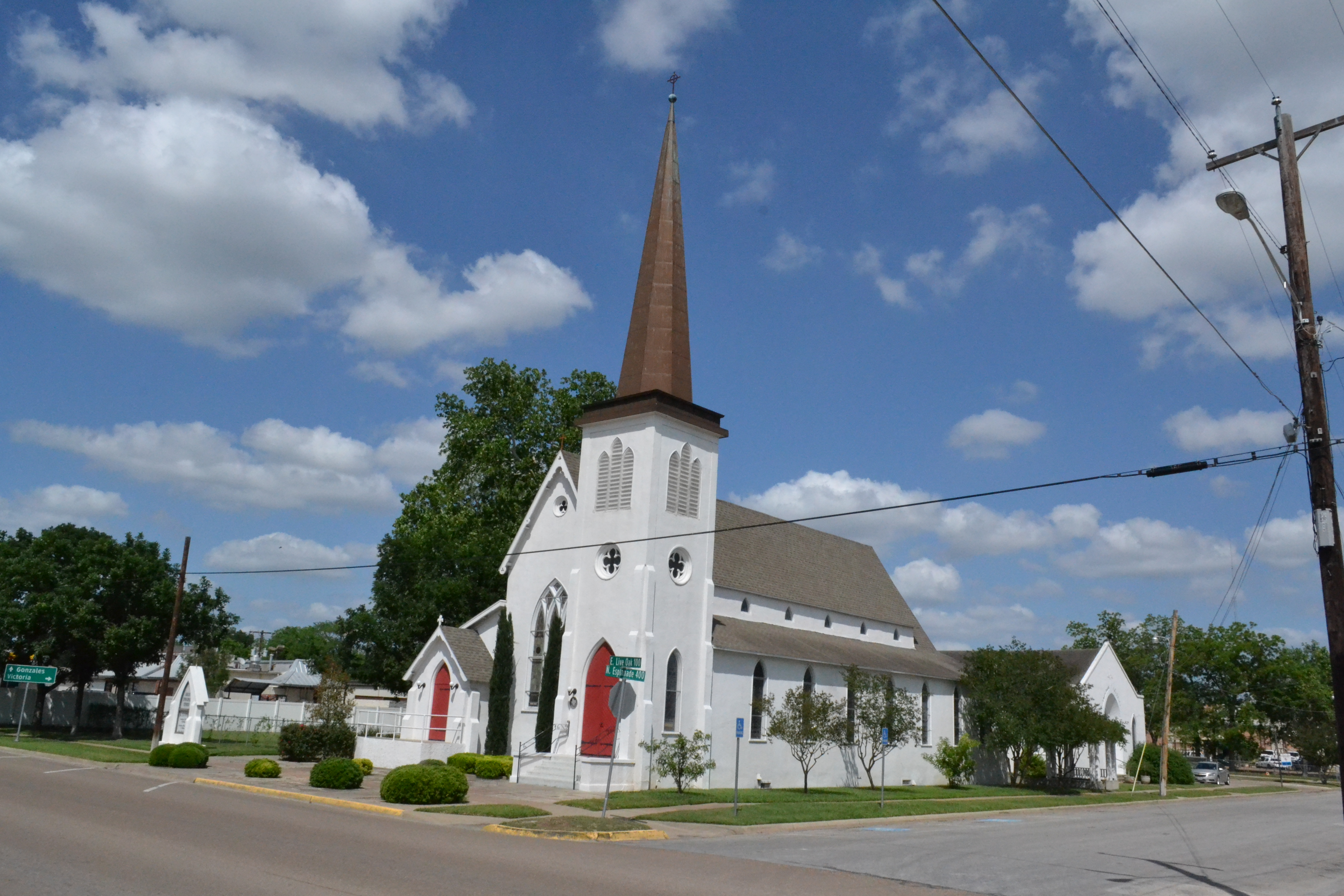
- Grace Church in 2014

- Location within Texas Location within the United States
- Location: 401 N. Esplanade, Cuero, Texas
- Coordinates: 29°5′33″N 97°17′23″W
- Area: less than one acre
- Built: 1889
- Architectural style: Gothic Revival
- MPS: Cuero MRA
- NRHP reference No.: 88001955
- RTHL No.: 2236

Significant dates
- Added to NRHP: October 31, 1988
- Designated RTHL: 1966

Grace Episcopal Church is a historic church at 401 N. Esplanade in Cuero, Texas. It is a congregation of the Episcopal Diocese of West Texas.

No membership statistics were reported in 2024 national parochial reports. In 2020, the church reported 74 members; in 2023, it reported 84 members. Plate and pledge financial support reported by the church in 2024 was $225,095. Average Sunday Attendance ASA reported in 2024 was 25 persons. This was a relative decrease on ASA of 39 in 2015.

== History ==
The church was built in 1889 and added to the National Register of Historic Places in 1988.

== See also ==
- National Register of Historic Places listings in DeWitt County, Texas
- Recorded Texas Historic Landmarks in DeWitt County
