= Terrell–Reuss Streets Historic District =

Historic district in Texas, United States

- U.S. National Register of Historic Places
- U.S. Historic district
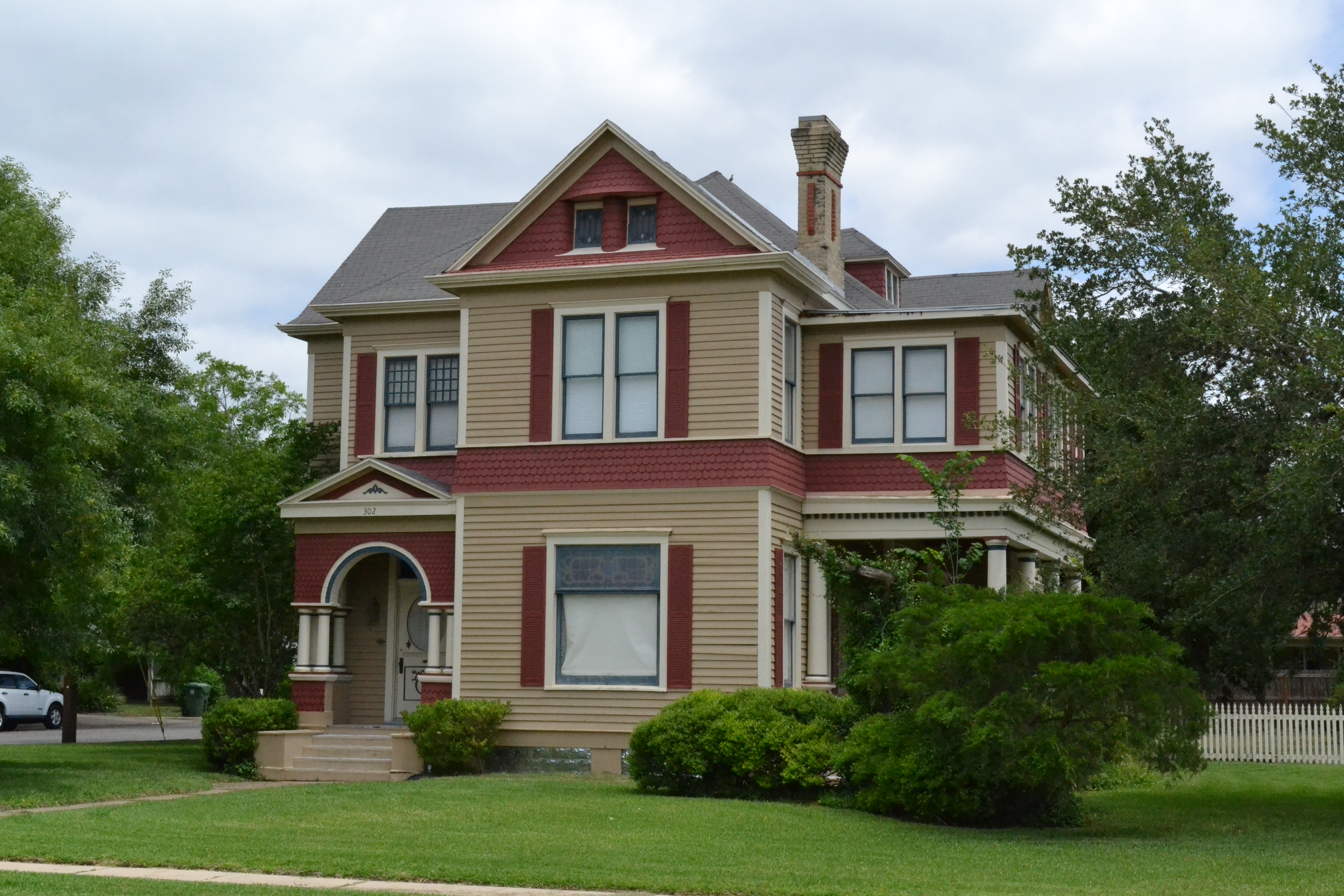
- Home in Terrell–Reuss District in 2014

- Location within Texas Location within the United States
- Location: 300 to 900 blocks of Terrell, 500 to 900 blocks of Indianola, and 200 blk. of W. Reuss to 400 blk. of E. Reuss, Cuero, Texas
- Coordinates: 29°5′44″N 97°17′18″W
- Area: 65 acres (26 ha)
- Built: 1883
- Architect: Jules Leffland, Et al.
- Architectural style: Late 19th and Early 20th Century American Movements, Late 19th and 20th Century Revivals, L-plan
- MPS: Cuero MRA
- NRHP reference No.: 88001997
- Added to NRHP: October 31, 1988

The Terrell–Reuss Streets Historic District is a 65-acre (26 ha) historic district in Cuero, Texas. It includes works of significance from 1883 on. It includes works by Jules Leffland and other architects. It was listed on the National Register of Historic Places in 1988; the listing included 63 contributing buildings.

== See also ==
- National Register of Historic Places listings in DeWitt County, Texas
