= New York, Texas and Mexican Railway =

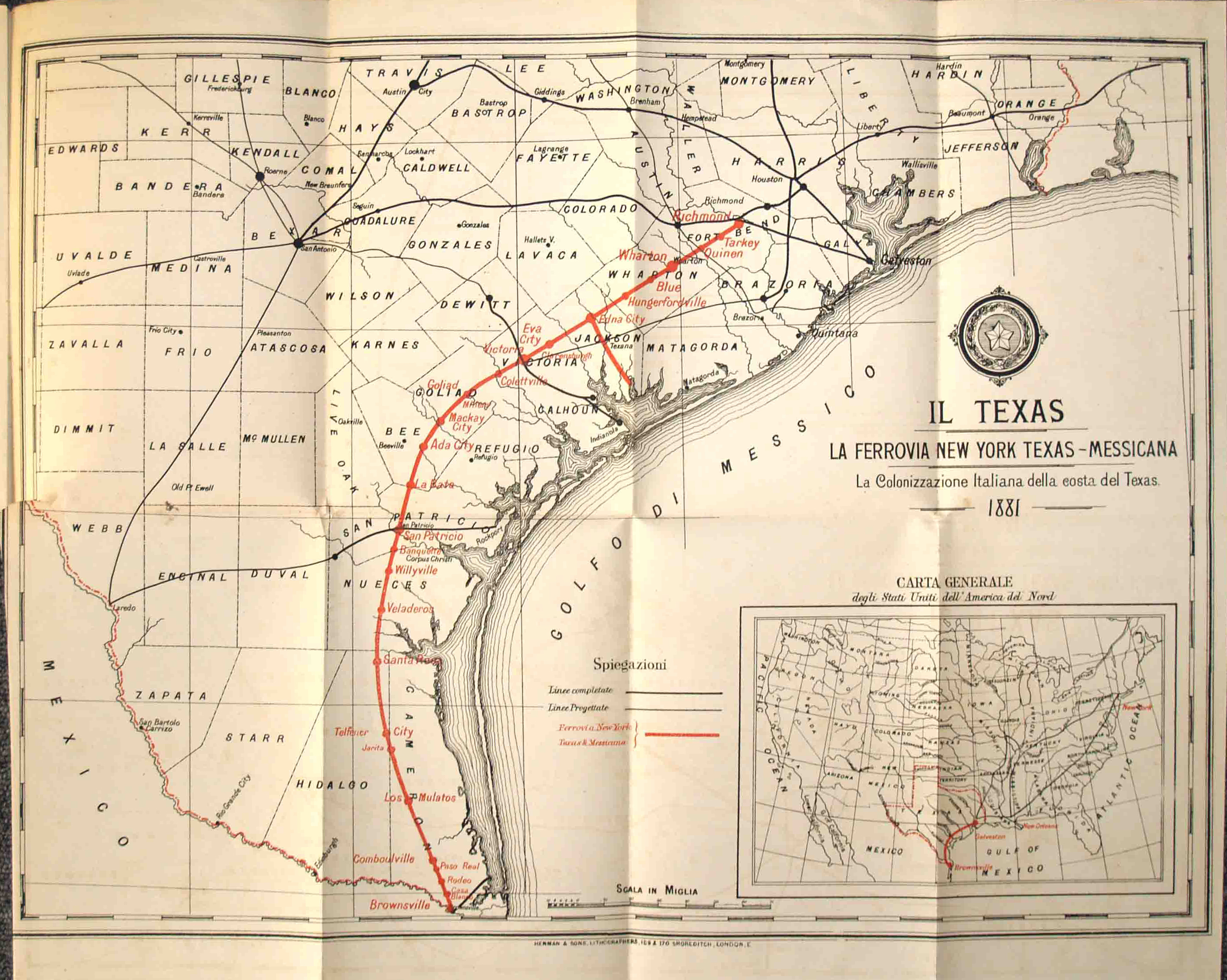
Telfener's 1881 map of the New York, Texas and Mexican Railway, to further be richer

The New York, Texas and Mexican Railway Company was a railroad business chartered in 1880 to connect New York City with Mexico City. Demised and virtually abandoned by the early 1990s, it was revived in June 2009, and is now part of the Canadian Pacific Kansas City network running from Canada to Mexico.

== Construction ==
Post the American Civil War, the southern parts of Texas suffered greatly economically, with its economy being highly reliant on agriculture. Railroad building was encouraged by the Government in Washington, with generous grants and subsidies available.

The railway was established by Joseph Telfener, an Italian engineer and financier, and his father-in-law Daniel E. Hungerford. The initial 90 miles of tracks were laid west, between an inter-connecting junction at Rosenberg, Texas (just 30 miles west of Houston), and Victoria by over 1,200 especially recruited Italian immigrants, meaning that the railroad colloquially became known as The Macaroni Line,

The company issued stock and sought land grants, but violated an agreement on its starting point. State law was subsequently changed to eliminate land grants to railroad and canal builders, and the railroad passed to Telfener's brother-in-law John William MacKay.

Mackay, who helped finance the project, and Telfener named its first six stations (Mackay, Telferner (sic), Hungerford, Edna, Inez, and Louise) after themselves and their family members. A historical marker in Hungerford commemorates the line.

== Merger and demise ==
In 1905 it was merged with the Buffalo Bayou, Brazos and Colorado Railway, which itself was acquired by Southern Pacific Railroad, which operated the 91 mile line until 1985. By the early 1990s, the tracks were mostly worn out, operations contained to the most easterly section, and the rest of the trackage was not maintained.

== Revival ==
In 1995, led by the vision of Kansas City Southern Railroad CEO Michael Haverty to connect the Chicago corridor directly to Mexico, and for the regional KCS to become a large international railroad, in 1995 the KCS acquired a 49% stake in the Texas Mexican Railway directly from the Mexican Government.

In 1996, as a result of the proposed merger between the Union Pacific Railroad and the Southern Pacific, the rival KCS/TM made certain demands of the Surface Transportation Board in approving the deal. The KCS/TM wanted trackage rights to enable it to connect the 380 mile distance from: Laredo, Texas, the crossing point of the TM into the United States; to Beaumont, Texas, the southern end junction of the KCS's route to Port Arthur, Texas. KCS/TM further requested the right to buy the virtually abandoned 91 miles of the SP "Macaroni Line", from Rosenberg to Victoria.

In August 2004, KCS again purchased a controlling interest in Tex-Mex.

The line laid dormant and unused for 11 years until 2006, when KCS/TM announced that they would rebuild the line to Class 1 standards, to avoid continued running on a circuitous UP monopolised route that took an extra 71 miles to run, from: Houston to Flatonia (UP Glidden Subdivision); Placedo and Bloomington (UP Cuero Subdivision), where they KCS trains enter UP Angleton/Brownsville Subdivisions, heading to Robstown, Texas. Construction began in January 2009 and the line opened for the first trains for over 20 years, by June 2009. The line now operates daily trains, has CTC signaling, and an intermodal facility at Kendleton, Texas.
