= National Register of Historic Places listings in DeWitt County, Texas =

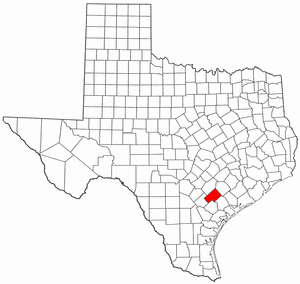
Location of DeWitt County in Texas

There are five districts and 55 individual properties listed on the National Register of Historic Places in DeWitt County, Texas. Ten individually listed properties are Recorded Texas Historic Landmarks including one that is also a State Antiquities Landmark. Two districts contain several more Recorded Texas Historic Landmarks.

This National Park Service list is complete through NPS recent listings posted June 6, 2026.

== Current listings ==
The publicly disclosed locations of National Register properties and districts may be seen in a mapping service provided.

	Name on the Register	Image	Date listed	Location	City or town	Description
1	Bates-Sheppard House	Bates-Sheppard House	October 31, 1988 (#88001948)	312 E. Broadway; 29°05′33″N 97°17′11″W	Cuero	Recorded Texas Historic Landmark
2	John Y. Bell House	John Y. Bell House	October 31, 1988 (#88001982)	304 E. Prairie; 29°05′46″N 97°17′07″W	Cuero	
3	M. D. Bennett House	M. D. Bennett House	October 31, 1988 (#88001963)	208 N. Hunt; 29°05′24″N 97°17′12″W	Cuero	
4	Billow-Thompson House	Billow-Thompson House	October 31, 1988 (#88001949)	402 E. Broadway; 29°05′32″N 97°17′09″W	Cuero	
5	Breeden-Runge Wholesale Grocery Company Building	Breeden-Runge Wholesale Grocery Company Building	October 31, 1988 (#88001957)	108 N. Frederick William; 29°05′32″N 97°17′43″W	Cuero	
6	Floyd Buchel House	Floyd Buchel House	October 31, 1988 (#88001950)	407 E. Broadway; 29°05′29″N 97°17′09″W	Cuero	
7	Arthur Burns House	Arthur Burns House	October 31, 1988 (#88001987)	130 E. Sarah; 29°05′44″N 97°17′14″W	Cuero	
8	John W. Burns House	John W. Burns House	October 31, 1988 (#88001947)	311 E. Broadway; 29°05′31″N 97°17′13″W	Cuero	
9	Callaway-Gillette House	Callaway-Gillette House	October 31, 1988 (#88001989)	306 E. Sarah; 29°05′42″N 97°17′07″W	Cuero	
10	J. B. Chaddock House	J. B. Chaddock House	October 31, 1988 (#88001995)	202 S. Valley; 29°05′10″N 97°17′06″W	Cuero	
11	City Water Works	City Water Works	October 31, 1988 (#88001956)	208 S. Esplanade; 29°05′21″N 97°17′33″W	Cuero	
12	Clement-Nagel House	Clement-Nagel House	October 31, 1988 (#88001974)	701 E. Morgan; 29°05′07″N 97°17′10″W	Cuero	
13	Colston-Gohmert House	Colston-Gohmert House	October 31, 1988 (#88001983)	309 E. Prairie; 29°05′44″N 97°17′06″W	Cuero	
14	Charles Cook House		October 31, 1988 (#88001986)	103 E. Sarah; 29°05′44″N 97°17′17″W	Cuero	Demolished
15	W. H. Crain House	W. H. Crain House	October 31, 1988 (#88001953)	508 E. Courthouse; 29°05′25″N 97°17′08″W	Cuero	
16	Cuero Commercial Historic District	Cuero Commercial Historic District	November 17, 1988 (#88001996)	Roughly bounded by Gonzales, Main, Terrell and Courthouse; 29°05′28″N 97°17′27″W	Cuero	Includes Recorded Texas Historic Landmark
17	Cuero Gin		October 31, 1988 (#88001970)	501 W. Main; 29°05′30″N 97°17′44″W	Cuero	Demolished by 2005
18	Cuero High School	Cuero High School	October 31, 1988 (#88001990)	405 E. Sarah; 29°05′55″N 97°17′04″W	Cuero	
19	Cuero Hydroelectric Plant		September 19, 1977 (#77001514)	2 mi (3.2 km). N of Cuero on Guadalupe Plant; 29°07′46″N 97°18′40″W	Cuero	
20	Cuero I Archeological District	Cuero I Archeological District	October 9, 1974 (#74002271)	Address restricted	Cuero	Extends into Gonzales County
21	E. A. Daule House		October 31, 1988 (#88001981)	201 W. Newman; 29°05′23″N 97°17′52″W	Cuero	
22	DeWitt County Courthouse	DeWitt County Courthouse	May 6, 1971 (#71000929)	Bounded by N. Gonzales, E. Live Oak, N. Clinton, and E. Courthouse Sts. 29°05′29″N 97°17′19″W	Cuero	State Antiquities Landmark, Recorded Texas Historic Landmark
23	DeWitt County Monument	DeWitt County Monument	March 6, 2019 (#100003421)	US 87 & Courthouse St. 29°05′17″N 97°16′34″W	Cuero	
24	East Main Street Residential Historic District	East Main Street Residential Historic District	October 31, 1988 (#88001998)	400 to 800 blocks of E. Main St. 29°05′16″N 97°17′07″W	Cuero	
25	Eckhardt Stores	Eckhardt Stores	June 29, 1976 (#76002020)	Eckhardt and Main St. 28°58′49″N 97°30′13″W	Yorktown	Recorded Texas Historic Landmark
26	William and L. F. Eichholz House	William and L. F. Eichholz House	October 31, 1988 (#88001954)	308 W. Courthouse; 29°05′37″N 97°17′39″W	Cuero	
27	English-German School	English-German School	October 31, 1988 (#88001978)	201 E. Newman; 29°05′09″N 97°17′30″W	Cuero	Recorded Texas Historic Landmark; building is condemned
28	J. B. Farris House		October 31, 1988 (#88001960)	502 N. Gonzales; 29°05′36″N 97°17′18″W	Cuero	Demolished
29	First Methodist Church	First Methodist Church	October 31, 1988 (#88001952)	301 E. Courthouse; 29°05′27″N 97°17′17″W	Cuero	
30	Alfred Friar House	Alfred Friar House	October 31, 1988 (#88001961)	703 N. Gonzales; 29°05′42″N 97°17′13″W	Cuero	
31	William Frobese Sr. House	William Frobese Sr. House	October 31, 1988 (#88001980)	305 E. Newman; 29°05′07″N 97°17′24″W	Cuero	Recorded Texas Historic Landmark
32	Grace Episcopal Church	Grace Episcopal Church	October 31, 1988 (#88001955)	401 N. Esplanade; 29°05′33″N 97°17′23″W	Cuero	Recorded Texas Historic Landmark
33	House at 1002 Stockdale	House at 1002 Stockdale	October 31, 1988 (#88001993)	1002 Stockdale; 29°04′47″N 97°17′37″W	Cuero	
34	House at 404 Stockdale	House at 404 Stockdale	October 31, 1988 (#88001992)	404 Stockdale; 29°05′07″N 97°17′27″W	Cuero	
35	House at 609 East Live Oak	House at 609 East Live Oak	October 31, 1988 (#88001968)	609 E. Live Oak; 29°05′24″N 97°17′02″W	Cuero	
36	Keller-Grunder House	Keller-Grunder House	October 31, 1988 (#88001973)	409 E. Morgan; 29°05′11″N 97°17′19″W	Cuero	Recorded Texas Historic Landmark
37	Albert and Kate Leinhardt House	Albert and Kate Leinhardt House	October 31, 1988 (#88001976)	818 E. Morgan; 29°05′11″N 97°17′01″W	Cuero	
38	Emil Leonardt House	Emil Leonardt House	November 4, 1988 (#88001975)	804 E. Morgan; 29°05′07″N 97°17′05″W	Cuero	
39	Leske Bar		October 31, 1988 (#88001969)	432 W. Main; 29°05′30″N 97°17′41″W	Cuero	Demolished by 2005, after being damaged in a flood in 1998
40	Valentine Ley House	Valentine Ley House	October 31, 1988 (#88001979)	206 E. Newman; 29°05′10″N 97°17′30″W	Cuero	
41	Lynch-Probst House		October 31, 1988 (#88001951)	502 E. Broadway; 29°05′31″N 97°17′06″W	Cuero	Demolished
42	Macedonia Baptist Church	Macedonia Baptist Church	October 31, 1988 (#88001967)	512 S. Indianola; 29°05′12″N 97°17′54″W	Cuero	
43	Frank Marie House	Frank Marie House	October 31, 1988 (#88001959)	402 E. French; 29°05′36″N 97°17′07″W	Cuero	
44	May-Hickey House		October 27, 1988 (#88002129)	FM 682 1.7 mi. S of jct. with TX 111; 29°15′39″N 97°08′40″W	Yoakum	Recorded Texas Historic Landmark
45	Meissner-Pleasants House	Meissner-Pleasants House	October 31, 1988 (#88001962)	108 N. Hunt; 29°05′21″N 97°17′12″W	Cuero	
46	Edward Mugge House	Edward Mugge House	October 31, 1988 (#88001994)	218 N. Terrell; 29°05′30″N 97°17′33″W	Cuero	Recorded Texas Historic Landmark
47	Municipal Power Plant	Municipal Power Plant	November 15, 1996 (#96001356)	810 Front St. 29°17′08″N 97°09′04″W	Yoakum	Recorded Texas Historic Landmark; now the city library
48	Old Beer and Ice Warehouse	Old Beer and Ice Warehouse	October 31, 1988 (#88001985)	104 SW Railroad; 29°05′23″N 97°17′33″W	Cuero	
49	Charles J. and Alvina Ott House	Charles J. and Alvina Ott House	October 31, 1988 (#88001965)	306 N. Hunt; 29°05′27″N 97°17′10″W	Cuero	
50	S. I. Ott House	S. I. Ott House	October 31, 1988 (#88001964)	302 N. Hunt; 29°05′26″N 97°17′11″W	Cuero	
51	O. F. and Mary Prigden House	O. F. and Mary Prigden House	October 31, 1988 (#88001958)	401 E. French; 29°05′34″N 97°17′08″W	Cuero	
52	J. M. Reuss House	J. M. Reuss House	October 31, 1988 (#88001991)	315 Stockdale; 29°05′09″N 97°17′24″W	Cuero	
53	St. Michael's Catholic Church	St. Michael's Catholic Church	October 31, 1988 (#88001971)	202 N. McLeod; 29°05′24″N 97°17′15″W	Cuero	
54	State Highway 27 Bridge at the Guadalupe River	State Highway 27 Bridge at the Guadalupe River	October 10, 1996 (#96001122)	US 87, .13 mi. S of jct. with US 183; 29°03′55″N 97°19′20″W	Cuero	
55	Elisha Stevens House	Elisha Stevens House	October 31, 1988 (#88001984)	408 E. Prairie; 29°05′44″N 97°17′02″W	Cuero	
56	Terrell-Reuss Streets Historic District	Terrell-Reuss Streets Historic District	October 31, 1988 (#88001997)	300 to 900 blocks of Terrell, 500 to 900 blocks of Indianola, and 200 blk. of W. Reuss to 400 blk. of E. Reuss; 29°05′44″N 97°17′18″W	Cuero	Includes Recorded Texas Historic Landmarks
57	W. F. Thomson House	W. F. Thomson House	October 31, 1988 (#88001972)	608 N. McLeod; 29°05′37″N 97°17′08″W	Cuero	
58	Dane Wittenbert House	Dane Wittenbert House	October 31, 1988 (#88001966)	402 S. Hunt; 29°05′05″N 97°17′20″W	Cuero	
59	Charles Wittmer House	Charles Wittmer House	October 31, 1988 (#88001977)	110 E. Newman; 29°05′11″N 97°17′33″W	Cuero	
60	Wofford-Finney House	Wofford-Finney House	August 14, 1992 (#92000984)	202 E. Prairie St. 29°05′48″N 97°17′11″W	Cuero	

== See also ==
- National Register of Historic Places listings in Texas
- Recorded Texas Historic Landmarks in DeWitt County
