= Kentucky Mutt Creek =

Stream in Victoria County, Texas, U.S.

Coordinates: 28.7116°N 96.6729°W

Kentucky Mutt Creek is a stream in Victoria County, Texas, in the United States.

The origin of the name Kentucky Mutt is obscure. One story tells of a woman who named it after her native home in Kentucky.

== See also ==
- List of rivers of Texas
