= Cody Wallace =

American football player (born 1984)

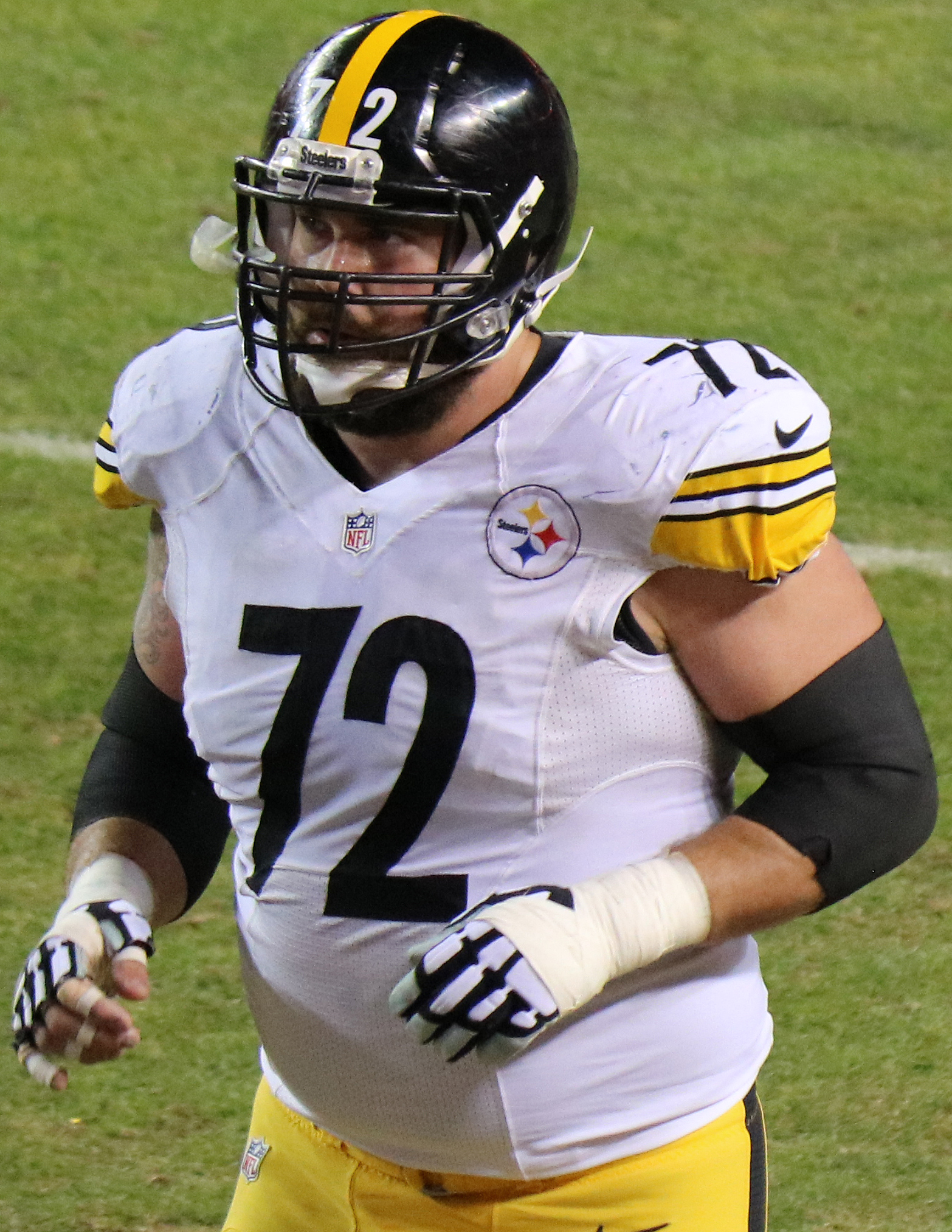
- Wallace with the Pittsburgh Steelers in 2016

No. 59, 74, 72
- Position: Guard/Center

Personal information
- Born: November 26, 1984 (age 41); Cuero, Texas, U.S.
- Listed height: 6 ft 4 in (1.93 m)
- Listed weight: 300 lb (136 kg)

Career information
- High school: Cuero
- College: Texas A&M
- NFL draft: 2008: 4th round, 107th overall pick

Career history
- San Francisco 49ers (2008–2009); Detroit Lions (2010)*; New York Jets (2010)*; Detroit Lions (2010); Houston Texans (2010–2012)*; Tampa Bay Buccaneers (2012); Pittsburgh Steelers (2013–2016)
- * Offseason or practice squad member only

Awards and highlights
- Second-team All-Big 12 (2006)

Career NFL statistics
- Games played: 49
- Games started: 22
- Stats at Pro Football Reference

Cody Layne Wallace (born November 26, 1984) is an American former professional football player who was a guard and center in the National Football League (NFL). He was selected by the San Francisco 49ers in the fourth round of the 2008 NFL draft. He played college football for the Texas A&M Aggies. Wallace was also a member of the New York Jets, Detroit Lions, Houston Texans, Tampa Bay Buccaneers, and Pittsburgh Steelers.

== Early life ==
Wallace attended Class 3A Cuero High School, where he earned all-state honors as an offensive lineman. He played center, offensive guard, and offensive tackle at Cuero. As a junior and senior, he made over 100 pancake blocks. On the defensive line as a senior, he posted 45 tackles. He also advanced to the powerlifting state meet.

As a college prospect in high school, he was rated 3 stars by Rivals.com, ranked 16th in the 2003 offensive guard prospect class, and ranked 42nd out of all 2003 Texas high school prospects. He was recruited by Texas A&M, Texas Tech, Iowa, and Texas. He chose to sign a National Letter of Intent with Texas A&M under head coach Dennis Franchione.

== College career ==
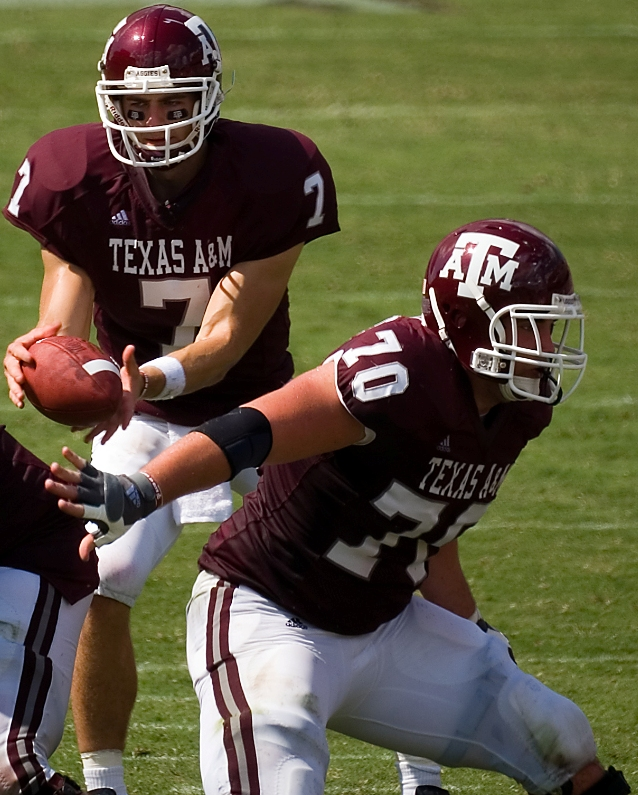
Wallace (right) defending quarterback Stephen McGee as a senior at Texas A&M.

Wallace redshirted his first season. In his freshman (2004) season, he played in five games and was listed second at strong guard on the depth chart.

As a sophomore, Wallace started in all 11 games as a center. He helped the team compile an average of 442.3 yards of total offense per game, which is the second best in team history. The team also rushed for 234.9 yards per game, which was A&M's best rushing record since 1991. He received SBC All-Big 12 honorable mention honors after the season.

Wallace continued to start as center in all 14 games during his junior season, helping the team produce 397.4 offensive yards per game, including a Big 12 record 206.8 rushing yards per game. The team also led the Big 12 in time of possession, third down conversion percentage, and the fewest turnovers. The offensive line allowed only 1.5 quarterback sacks per game. For his efforts, he was named to the AT&T All-Big 12 Football Second-team.

Prior to his senior season, he was named to the Preseason All-Big 12 Football Team. After the regular season in his senior year, he was named to the All-Big 12 Football First-team, and was awarded by the Big 12 coaches (who are not allowed to vote for their own players) as the co-offensive lineman of the year. He was also named a Rimington Trophy finalist.

=== Awards and honors ===
- 2005 All-Big 12 Honorable Mention
- 2006, 2007 Team captain
- 2006 All-Big 12 Second-team
- 2006 ESPN The Magazine/CoSIDA Academic All-District first-team
- 2007 Rimington Trophy finalist
- 2007 Draddy Trophy semifinalist
- 2007 Preseason All-Big 12 Team
- 2007 Member of the Leadership Council
- 2007 Big 12 co-Offensive Lineman of the Year
- 2007 Playboy All-American
- 2007 ESPN Academic All-America Second-team
- 2007 ESPN All-Big 12 Second-team

== Professional career ==
=== Pre-draft ===
At the 2008 NFL Combine, Wallace ran a 5.30 40-yard dash and made 26 repetitions on the 225-lb bench press.

=== San Francisco 49ers ===
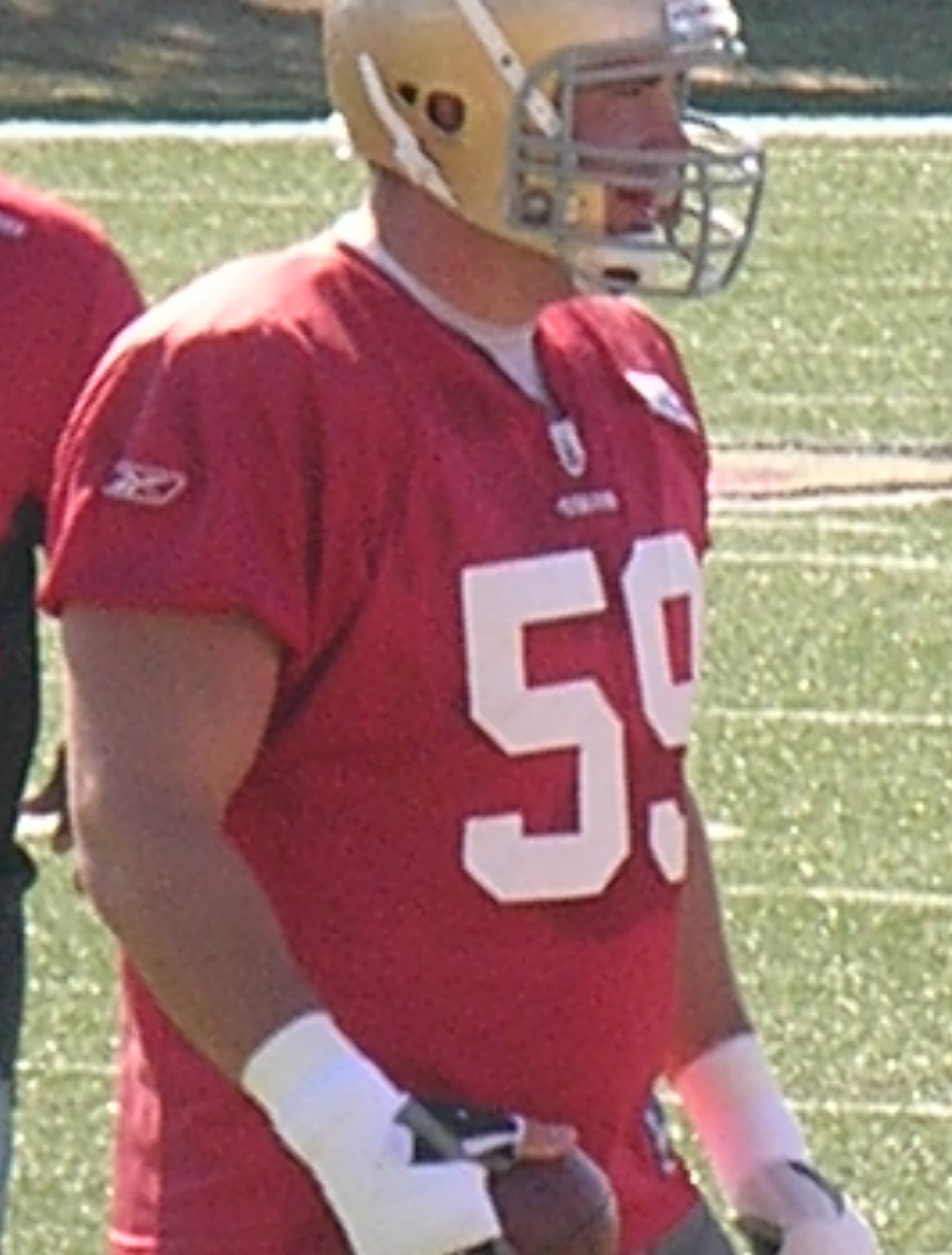
Wallace during 49ers training camp in 2010

In the 2008 NFL draft, he was selected by the San Francisco 49ers in the fourth round (107th overall). The 49ers expect him to play early on as Eric Heitmann's backup. 49ers head coach Mike Nolan, when asked about Wallace's selection, commented: "Not necessarily that we need a center, but we wanted the best player on the board and because of the flexibility of the other guys, it doesn’t hurt us to take a center. As a matter of fact it helps us in getting a better offensive line. We coached him at the Senior Bowl. We really liked him. We were pleased he was there at our fourth pick, and we got him." He signed a four-year contract with the team on July 23.

Wallace was declared inactive in all 16 games of his rookie season. He played in one game during the 2009 season.

Wallace was cut by the 49ers prior to the 2010 season.

=== Detroit Lions (first stint) ===
On September 22, 2010, Wallace signed into the Detroit Lions' practice squad. The Lions released Wallace from their practice squad on October 3, 2010.

=== New York Jets ===
Wallace was signed to the New York Jets practice squad of October 13, 2010.

=== Detroit Lions (second stint) ===
The Lions signed Wallace off New York's practice squad and to their active roster on October 20, 2010.

=== Houston Texans ===
After Wallace was cut from the Lions roster for the second time, he was signed to the Houston Texans practice squad. Wallace was cut on September 3, 2011 by the Texans. He was signed to the practice squad on September 22.

=== Tampa Bay Buccaneers ===
Wallace was released by Houston at the end of the 2012 preseason, and was immediately picked up by Tampa Bay. He appeared in eight games for Tampa in the 2012 season.

=== Pittsburgh Steelers ===
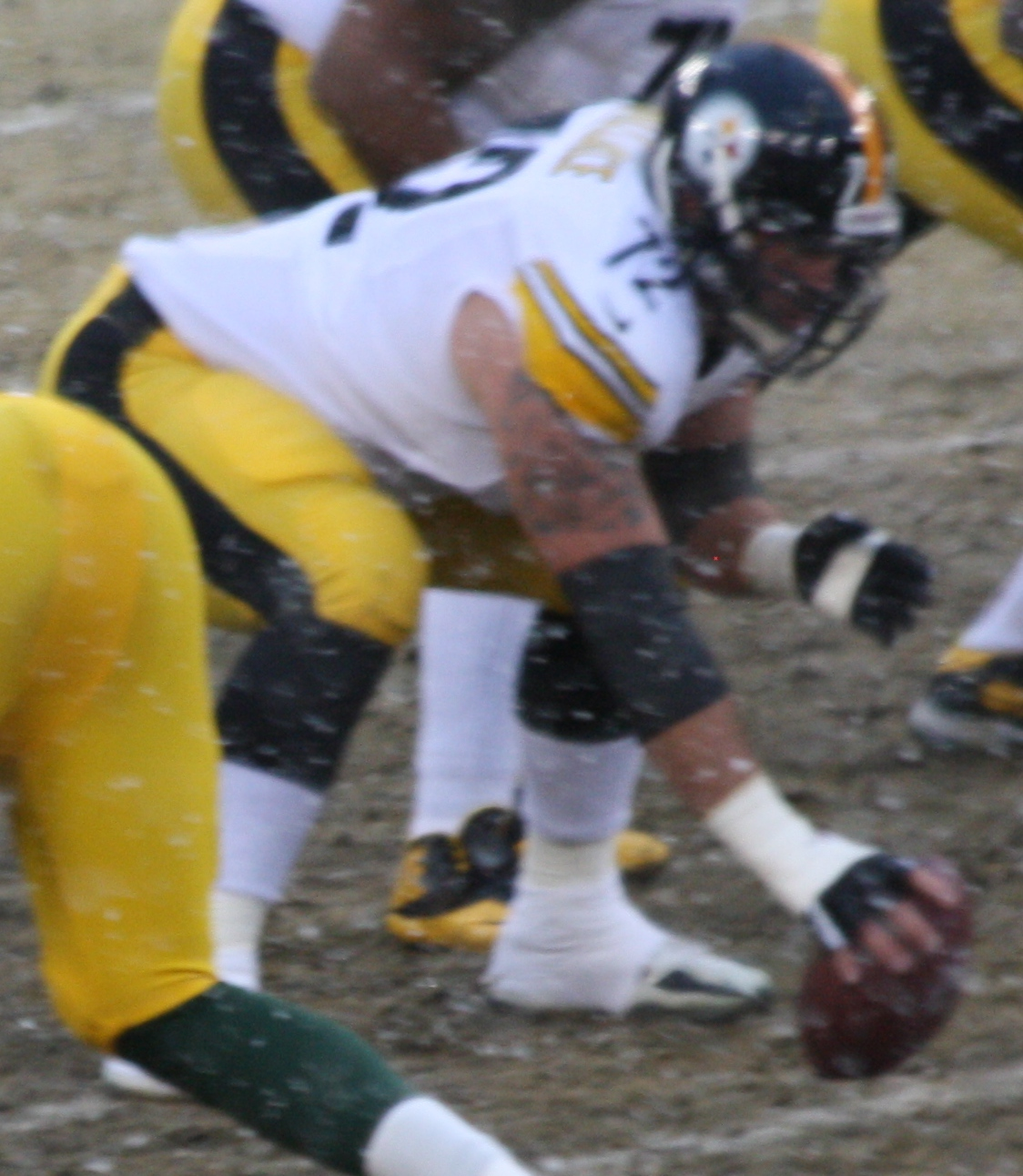
Wallace preparing to snap

Pittsburgh signed Wallace in September 2013, after he was a final cut from Tampa Bay. The Steelers projected him as a back-up at both center and guard. He dressed for his first game with Pittsburgh against Baltimore on October 20.

Following a week-14 loss against the Dolphins during the 2013 season, Wallace was fined $17,875 by the NFL for two infractions. One was for striking an opponent late and another for grabbing/hitting another player's private area. During a week-14 game in 2015 against the Denver Broncos, Wallace delivered a late hit against Broncos safety David Bruton, resulting in a personal foul and fine of $23,152.

Wallace injured his knee during the 2016 preseason and was inactive for the first seven games of the season before being placed on injured reserve on November 5, 2016.

== Personal life ==
Wallace was raised by his paternal grandparents, since both his parents died when he was young. When he was 8, his father, aged 43, died in prison. His mother died of an unknown illness when he was 16, and was unable to take care of her two children many years before that. To feel his mother's presence, he wears her stud earrings. Wallace stated: "Going through so much at a young age, it seems like I can handle more difficult situations maybe easier than most people. I just kind of look at everything in a little bigger picture." 49ers head coach Mike Nolan compared Wallace to former 49ers center Jeremy Newberry as "a no-nonsense guy when it comes to football."

He received his bachelor's degree in sport management from Texas A&M in May 2007, prior to his senior season. He worked on a master's degree his senior season.

On May 22, 2010, Wallace married his longtime girlfriend, Chely Marie George of Pleasanton, California.
