= Bloomington Independent School District =

School district in Texas, United States

Location
- Bloomington, Texas ESC Region 3 United States
- Coordinates: 28°51′31″N 96°20′13″W

District information
- Type: Independent school district
- Grades: Pre-K through 12
- Superintendent: Mark Anglin
- Schools: 4 (2017-18)
- NCES District ID: 4810500

Students and staff
- Students: 845 (2010-11)
- Teachers: 67.24 (2009-10) (on full-time equivalent (FTE) basis)
- Student–teacher ratio: 12.76 (2009-10)
- Athletic conference: UIL Class 2A Football Division I
- District mascot: Bobcats
- Colors: Kelly green and white

Other information
- TEA District Accountability Rating for 2011-12: Academically Acceptable
- Website: Bloomington ISD

Bloomington Independent School District is a public school district based in the community of Bloomington in unincorporated Victoria County, Texas, United States. The district operates one high school, Bloomington High School.

== Finances ==
As of the 2010–2011 school year, the appraised valuation of property in the district was $143,986,000. As of recently Bloomington Independent School District has been put under investigation by the Victoria County Sheriff's Office because of the suspected misuse of over $500,000 in federal funds. The maintenance tax rate was $0.104 and the bond tax rate was $0.048 per $100 of appraised valuation.

== Academic achievement ==
In 2011, the school district was rated "academically acceptable" by the Texas Education Agency. Forty-nine percent of districts in Texas in 2011 received the same rating. No state accountability ratings will be given to districts in 2012. A school district in Texas can receive one of four possible rankings from the Texas Education Agency: Exemplary (the highest possible ranking), Recognized, Academically Acceptable, and Academically Unacceptable (the lowest possible ranking).

Historical district TEA accountability ratings

- 2011: Academically Acceptable
- 2010: Academically Acceptable
- 2009: Academically Acceptable
- 2008: Academically Acceptable
- 2007: Academically Acceptable
- 2006: Academically Acceptable
- 2005: Academically Acceptable
- 2004: Academically Acceptable

== Schools ==
In the 2011–2012 school year, Bloomington ISD operated four schools.

- Bloomington High School (Grades 9-12)
- Bloomington Junior High School (Grades 6-8)
- Bloomington Elementary School (Grades 2-5)
- Placedo Elementary School (Grades PK-1)

== Special programs ==
=== Athletics ===
Bloomington High School participates in the boys sports of baseball, basketball, football . The school participates in the girls sports of basketball, softball, and volleyball. For the 2012 through 2014 school years, Bloomington High School will play football in UIL Class 2A Division II.

== See also ==
- List of school districts in Texas
- List of high schools in Texas
