= Victoria Independent School District =

School district in Texas, United States

Address
- 102 Profit Drive Victoria, Texas, 77901; United States

District information
- Grades: PK–12
- Schools: 25
- NCES District ID: 4844150

Students and staff
- Students: 13,027 (2023–2024)
- Teachers: 899.32 (on an FTE basis)
- Student–teacher ratio: 14.49:1

Other information
- Website: www.visd.net

Victoria Independent School District is a public school district based in Victoria, Texas, United States.

VISD serves the city of Victoria, the Quail Creek census-designated place, portions of the Inez CDP, and the unincorporated community of McFaddin. Middle and high school students from the community of Nursery may choose between Victoria ISD or Cuero Independent School District.

In 2009, the school district was rated "academically acceptable" by the Texas Education Agency.

== Schools ==
=== High schools ===
- Grades 9-12
  - Victoria East High School
  - Victoria West High School

=== Middle schools ===
- Grades 6-8
  - Howell Middle School
  - Cade Middle School
  - Patti Welder Middle School
  - Stroman Middle School

=== Elementary schools ===
- Grades K-5
  - DeLeon Elementary School
  - Mission Valley Elementary School
- Grades PK-5
  - Aloe Elementary School
  - Chandler Elementary School
  - Crain Elementary School
  - Dudley Magnet School
  - Hopkins Magnet School
  - Juan Linn Magnet School
  - O'Connor Magnet School
  - Rowland Magnet School
  - Schorlemmer Elementary school
  - Shields Magnet School
  - Smith Magnet School
  - Torres Elementary School
  - Vickers Elementary School
- Early Learning Center
  - F.W. Gross Early Learning Center

=== Other Campuses ===
- Career & Technical Institute (Grades 9-12)
- Juvenile Justice Center (Grades 5-12)
- Mitchell Guidance Center (Grades 6-12)
- Liberty Academy (Grades 9-12)
- Victoria Area Center for Advanced Learning (Grades 9-12)

== Construction Projects ==
In May 2007, voters approved a $159 million bond package that called for the construction of new schools as well as renovation of existing campuses. Five new campuses - two elementary, one middle, and two high schools - were constructed as a part of this bond measure. The elementary school sites are located at 4208 Lone Tree Road (Rofoldo Torres Elementary School) and 2654 Mallette Drive (Ella Schorlemmer Elementary School). These schools opened at the start of the 2009-2010 school year. The new middle school (Harold Cade Middle School) and two high schools (Victoria East High School and Victoria West High School) opened the following year. The Stroman Campus of Memorial High School became the Victoria Area Advanced Learning Center, offering middle and high school students higher level courses in a centralized location. The Memorial High School Senior Campus became the district's events center. Memorial Stadium is located on this site as well as a quality track, tennis courts, dressing rooms for multiple sports, and an agricultural farm with classroom facilities. A new auditorium and natatorium, included in the overall bond package, were also constructed on the site.
