= Cuero High School =

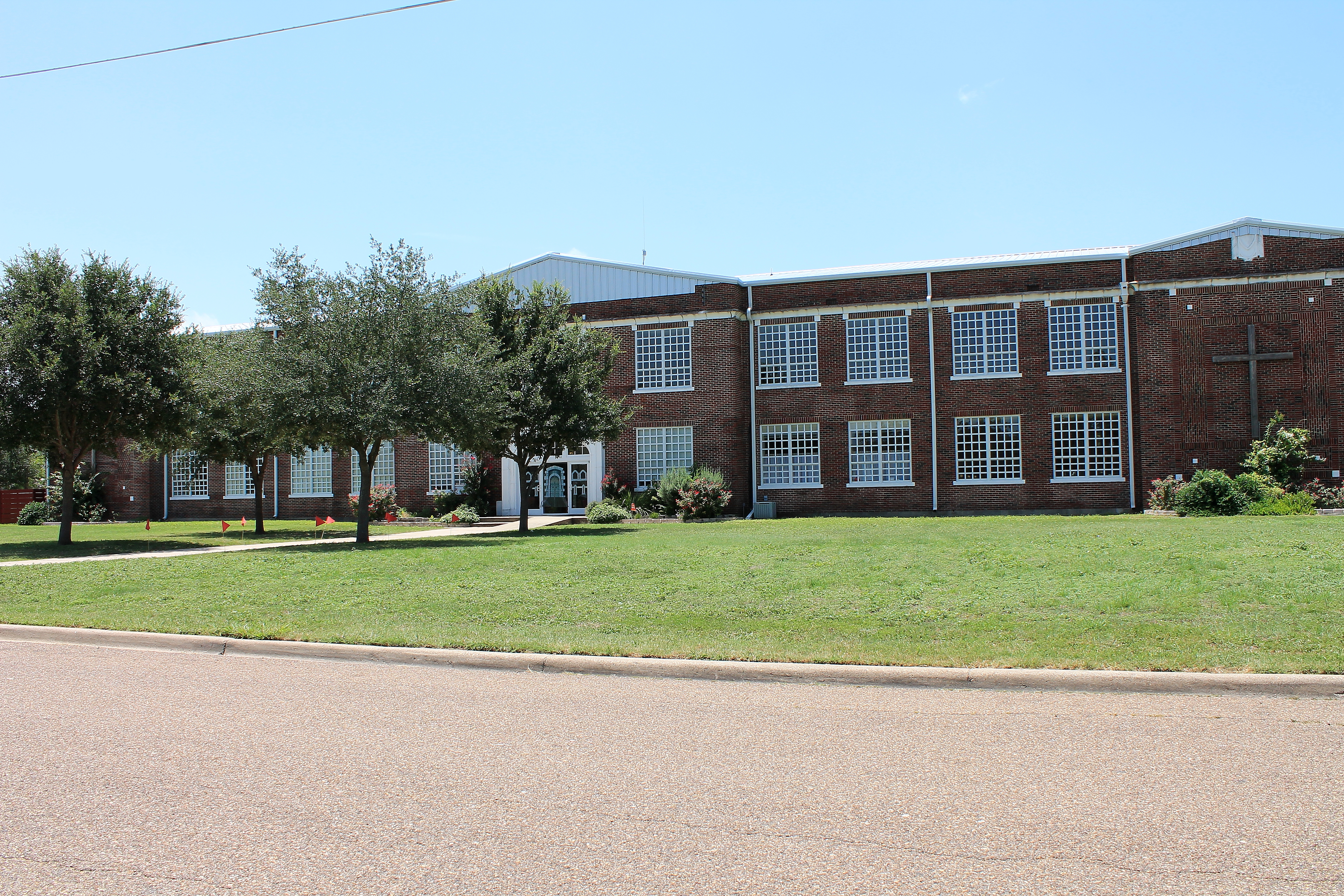

Location
- 920 E Broadway; Cuero, Texas 77954-2132; United States

Information
- School type: Public high school
- School district: Cuero Independent School District
- Principal: Adam Arredondo
- Teaching staff: 52.47 (on an FTE basis)
- Grades: 9–12
- Enrollment: 641 (2023-2024)
- Student to teacher ratio: 12.22
- Colors: Green & White
- Athletics conference: UIL Class AAAA
- Mascot: Gobbler/Lady Gobbler
- Website: chs.cueroisd.org

Cuero High School is a public high school located in Cuero, Texas, United States and classified as a 4A school by the University Interscholastic League (UIL). It is part of the Cuero Independent School District located in central DeWitt County. In 2015, the school was rated "Met Standard" by the Texas Education Agency.

== Athletics ==
The Cuero Gobblers compete in these sports -

Cross Country, Volleyball, Football, Basketball, Powerlifting, Golf, Tennis, Track, Softball & Baseball

=== State titles ===
- Football -
  - 1973(3A), 1974(3A), 1987(3A), 2018(4A)
- Boys Track -
  - 1988(3A), 2005(3A), 2006(3A), 2008(3A)

== Notable alumni ==
- Cody Wallace, NFL player
- Henry Sheppard, NFL player
- Alois Blackwell, NFL player
- Arthur Whittington, NFL player
- Fred Hansen, 1964 Olympic gold medalist in pole vault
- Jordan Whittington, NFL player and former wide receiver for the Texas Longhorns
