= Old Bloomington High School =

- Bloomington High School
- U.S. National Register of Historic Places
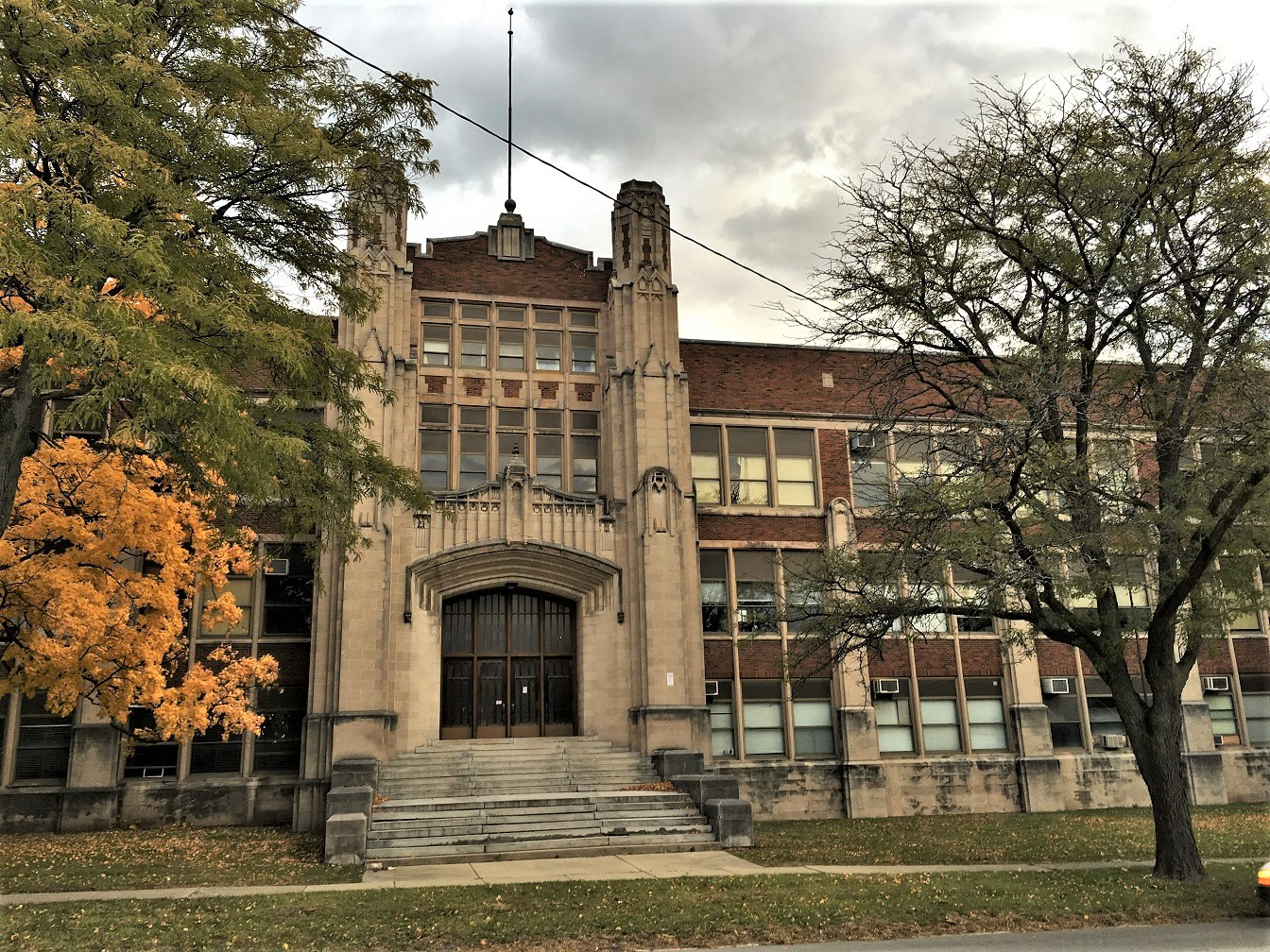

- Location within Illinois Location within the United States
- Location: 510 E. Washington St., Bloomington, Illinois
- Coordinates: 40°28′47″N 88°59′15″W
- Built: 1917
- Architect: Arthur L. Pillsbury
- Architectural style: Collegiate Gothic
- NRHP reference No.: 100002327
- Added to NRHP: April 19, 2018

The Old Bloomington High School is a historic high school building at 510 E. Washington Street in Bloomington, Illinois. Opened in 1917, the building replaced another high school building from 1895, which was one of several buildings used for the local high school since its establishment in 1857; all of these older buildings have since been demolished. Bloomington architect Arthur L. Pillsbury designed the building in the Collegiate Gothic style, a variant on the popular Gothic Revival style which, as its name suggests, was mainly used for large educational buildings. The building's design includes a large, detailed Gothic arched main entrance with towering piers at each side, large windows with limestone surrounds, and projecting piers at the front corners and side entrances. In 1936–37, an addition funded by the Works Progress Administration was added to the building; the addition was designed by Schaeffer & Hooten, a descendant of Pillsbury's firm, and matched the style of the original building. The building served as Bloomington's main high school until a new building opened in 1959. It then became a junior high school and remained so until it closed in 1990.

The building was added to the National Register of Historic Places on April 19, 2018.
