= Nursery, Texas =

- unincorporated community
- Location within the state of Texas Nursery, Texas (the United States)
- Coordinates: 28°55′25″N 97°05′55″W
- Country: United States
- State: Texas
- County: Victoria
- Elevation: 130 ft (40 m)
- Time zone: UTC-6 (Central (CST))
  - Summer (DST): UTC-5 (CDT)
- Area code: 361
- FIPS code: 48-52752
- GNIS feature ID: 1364246

Nursery is an unincorporated community in Victoria County, Texas, United States. It is part of the Victoria Metropolitan Statistical Area.

On April 12, 1833, Silvestre De León and his wife Rosalie received a 4,428-acre tract of land from the Mexican government. Nursery was founded in 1884 on part of that land.

The Nursery Independent School District serves area elementary school students in grades kindergarten through five, while sixth- through 12th-graders attend the nearby district of Cuero.
