= Cuero, Texas =

- City
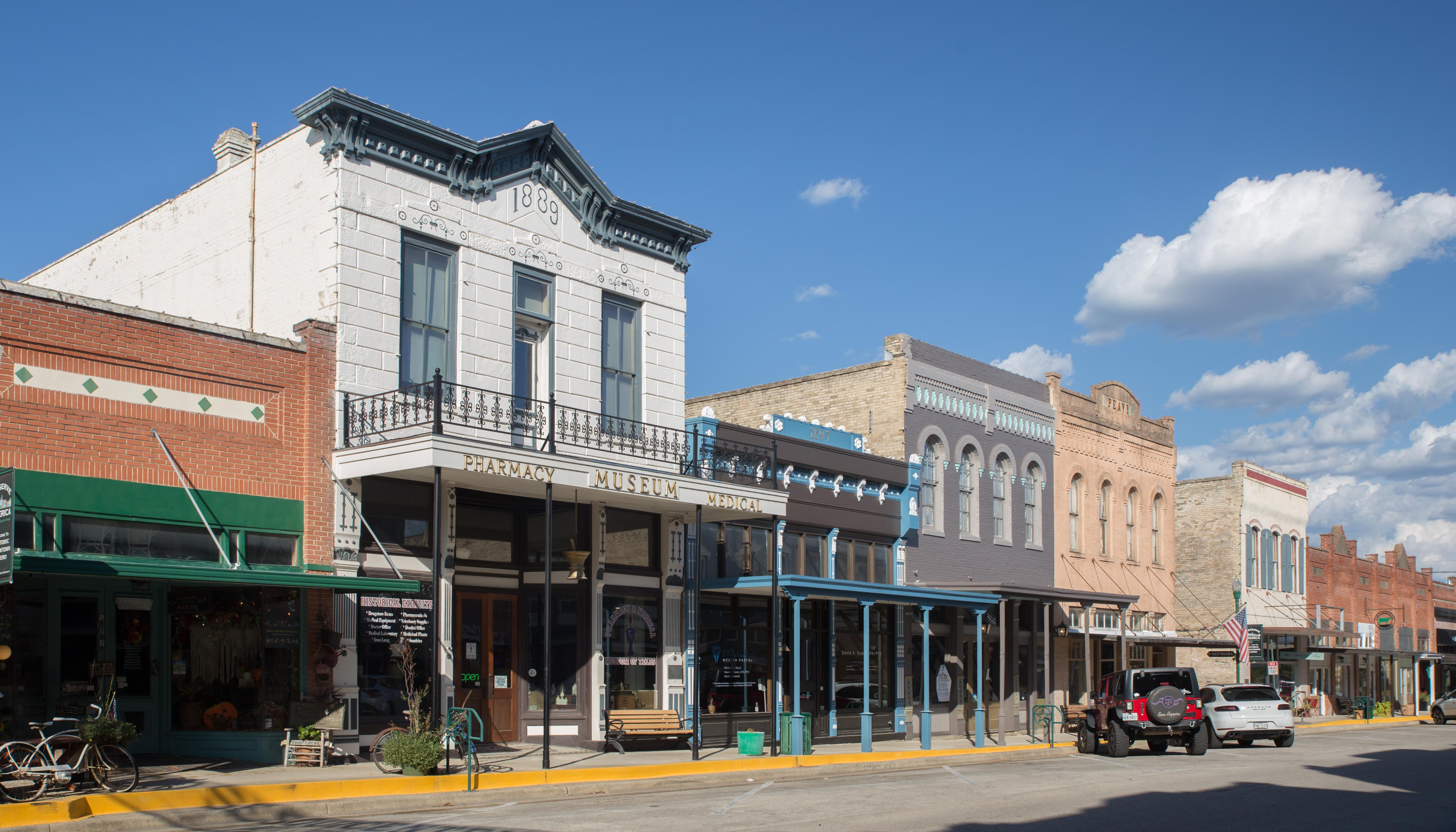
- Cuero Commercial Historic District
- Nickname: Turkey Capital
- Motto: History, Heritage, Hospitality
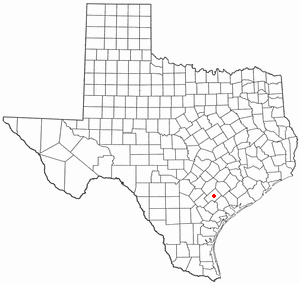
- Location of Cuero, Texas

- Coordinates: 29°5′37″N 97°17′28″W
- Country: United States
- State: Texas
- County: DeWitt

Area
  - Total: 6.58 sq mi (17.05 km^{2})
  - Land: 6.56 sq mi (17.00 km^{2})
  - Water: 0.019 sq mi (0.05 km^{2})
- Elevation: 184 ft (56 m)

Population (2020)
  - Total: 8,128
  - Density: 1,254.7/sq mi (484.45/km^{2})
- Time zone: UTC-6 (Central (CST))
  - Summer (DST): UTC-5 (CDT)
- ZIP code: 77954
- Area code: 361
- FIPS code: 48-18092
- GNIS feature ID: 1377543
- Website: www.cityofcuero.com

Cuero (/ˈkwɛəroʊ/ KWAIR-oh) is a city in and the county seat of DeWitt County, Texas, United States. Its population was 8,128 at the 2020 census.

== History ==
The city of Cuero got its start in the mid-19th century as a stopping point on the Chisholm Trail cattle route to Kansas. According to the Handbook of Texas Online, "Gustav Schleicher founded the latter town as a way-station and moved to it soon afterward, in 1872." It was not recognized as a town until 1873, though, when it was officially founded. The city was named for the Spanish word "hide", referring to the leather made from animal hides. The industry was extremely short-lived, however, and gave way to various forms of ranching. The city had several Old West gunfights related to clan feuding following the Civil War.

Cuero's population grew considerably in the 1870s and 1880s, as residents from the coastal town of Indianola settled here after major hurricanes in this period destroyed sizeable portions of that city. Cuero thrived through much of the late 19th and early 20th centuries by the introduction and practice of turkey ranching in the area. Today, agriculture is still the primary industry in the region. Cuero is considered to be one of the top cattle producers and shippers in Texas.

== Geography ==
Cuero is located east of the center of DeWitt County near the mouth of Sandies Creek, where it empties into the Guadalupe River.

U.S. Routes 87, 77 Alternate, and 183 pass through the city. All three highways follow South Esplanade Street into the center of town; US 87 then leaves town via East Broadway Street, while US 77A and 183 continue north out of town on North Esplanade Street. US 87 leads southeast 28 miles (45 km) to Victoria and west 87 miles (140 km) to San Antonio. US 77 Alternate leads northeast 16 miles (26 km) to Yoakum, and US 183 leads north 32 miles (51 km) to Gonzales. Both 77 Alternate and 183 lead south 31 miles (50 km) to Goliad.

According to the United States Census Bureau, Cuero has a total area of 4.9 square miles (12.8 km^{2}), of which 0.02 square miles (0.05 km^{2}), or 0.36%, is covered by water.

=== Climate ===
The climate in this area is characterized by hot, humid summers and generally mild to cool winters. According to the Köppen climate classification, Cuero has a humid subtropical climate, Cfa on climate maps. Cuero has an annual average precipitation of 38.0 in (965.2 mm), all rain, as snow is negligible in the area.

Climate data for Cuero, Texas (1991–2020 normals, extremes 1901–present)
Month	Jan	Feb	Mar	Apr	May	Jun	Jul	Aug	Sep	Oct	Nov	Dec	Year
Record high °F (°C)	92 (33)	98 (37)	99 (37)	99 (37)	103 (39)	111 (44)	110 (43)	114 (46)	113 (45)	101 (38)	98 (37)	92 (33)	114 (46)
Mean daily maximum °F (°C)	66.3 (19.1)	68.9 (20.5)	75.2 (24.0)	82.1 (27.8)	88.6 (31.4)	94.1 (34.5)	96.9 (36.1)	98.3 (36.8)	92.9 (33.8)	85.9 (29.9)	75.3 (24.1)	67.4 (19.7)	82.7 (28.2)
Daily mean °F (°C)	54.1 (12.3)	57.2 (14.0)	63.8 (17.7)	70.4 (21.3)	78.0 (25.6)	83.4 (28.6)	85.6 (29.8)	86.2 (30.1)	81.1 (27.3)	72.8 (22.7)	62.7 (17.1)	55.4 (13.0)	70.9 (21.6)
Mean daily minimum °F (°C)	42.0 (5.6)	45.5 (7.5)	52.3 (11.3)	58.7 (14.8)	67.4 (19.7)	72.7 (22.6)	74.3 (23.5)	74.1 (23.4)	69.3 (20.7)	59.8 (15.4)	50.0 (10.0)	43.5 (6.4)	59.1 (15.1)
Record low °F (°C)	9 (−13)	12 (−11)	18 (−8)	31 (−1)	41 (5)	50 (10)	58 (14)	58 (14)	42 (6)	24 (−4)	17 (−8)	7 (−14)	7 (−14)
Average precipitation inches (mm)	2.33 (59)	1.54 (39)	2.76 (70)	2.77 (70)	4.41 (112)	3.92 (100)	2.44 (62)	2.59 (66)	3.57 (91)	3.27 (83)	2.35 (60)	2.27 (58)	34.22 (869)
Average snowfall inches (cm)	0.0 (0.0)	0.0 (0.0)	0.0 (0.0)	0.0 (0.0)	0.0 (0.0)	0.0 (0.0)	0.0 (0.0)	0.0 (0.0)	0.0 (0.0)	0.0 (0.0)	0.0 (0.0)	0.2 (0.51)	0.2 (0.51)
Average precipitation days (≥ 0.01 in)	4.5	4.7	5.1	4.2	4.8	5.6	4.1	4.4	5.5	3.7	4.2	4.6	55.4
Average snowy days (≥ 0.1 in)	0.0	0.0	0.0	0.0	0.0	0.0	0.0	0.0	0.0	0.0	0.0	0.2	0.2
Source: NOAA

== Demographics ==
Historical population
Census	Pop.	Note	%±
1880	1,333		—
1890	2,442		83.2%
1900	3,422		40.1%
1910	3,109		−9.1%
1920	3,671		18.1%
1930	4,672		27.3%
1940	5,474		17.2%
1950	7,498		37.0%
1960	7,338		−2.1%
1970	6,956		−5.2%
1980	7,124		2.4%
1990	6,700		−6.0%
2000	6,571		−1.9%
2010	6,841		4.1%
2020	8,128		18.8%
U.S. Decennial Census

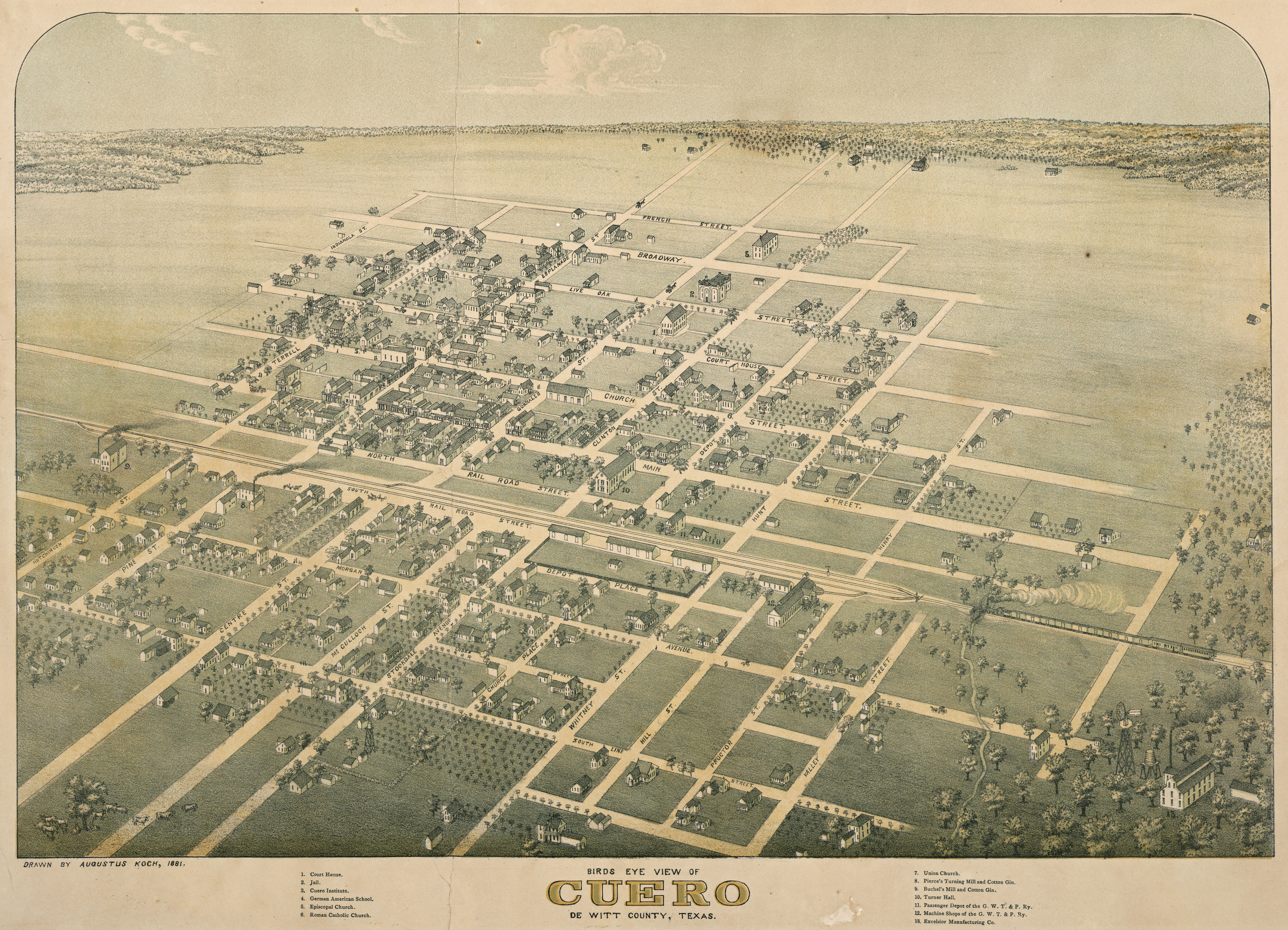
Map of the city in 1881

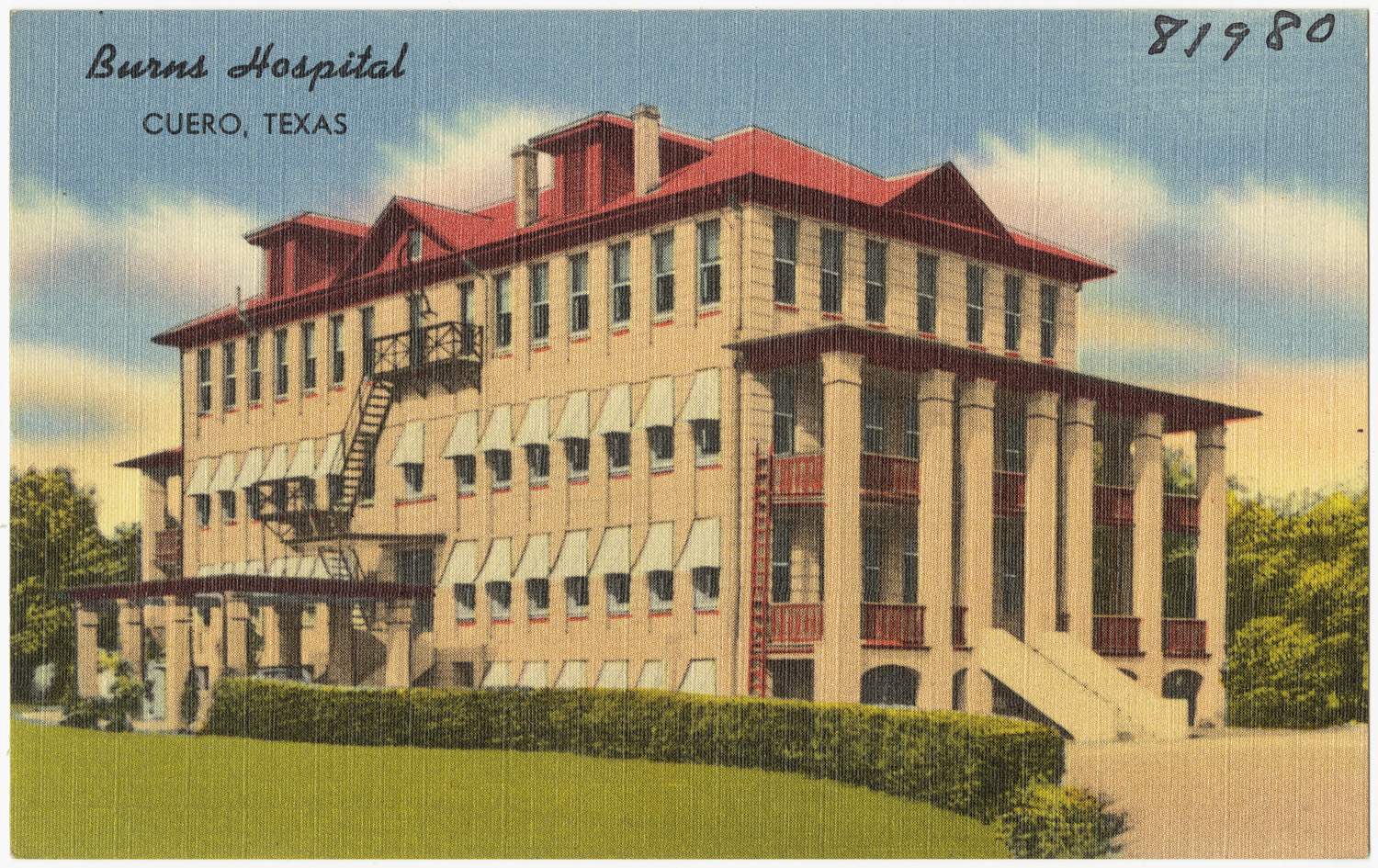
Postcard showing the Burns Hospital, Cuero, Texas, between 1930 and 1945

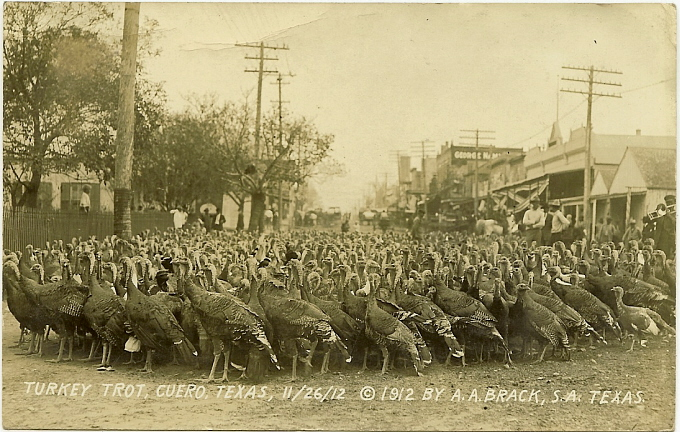
"Turkey Trot" on November 16, 1912

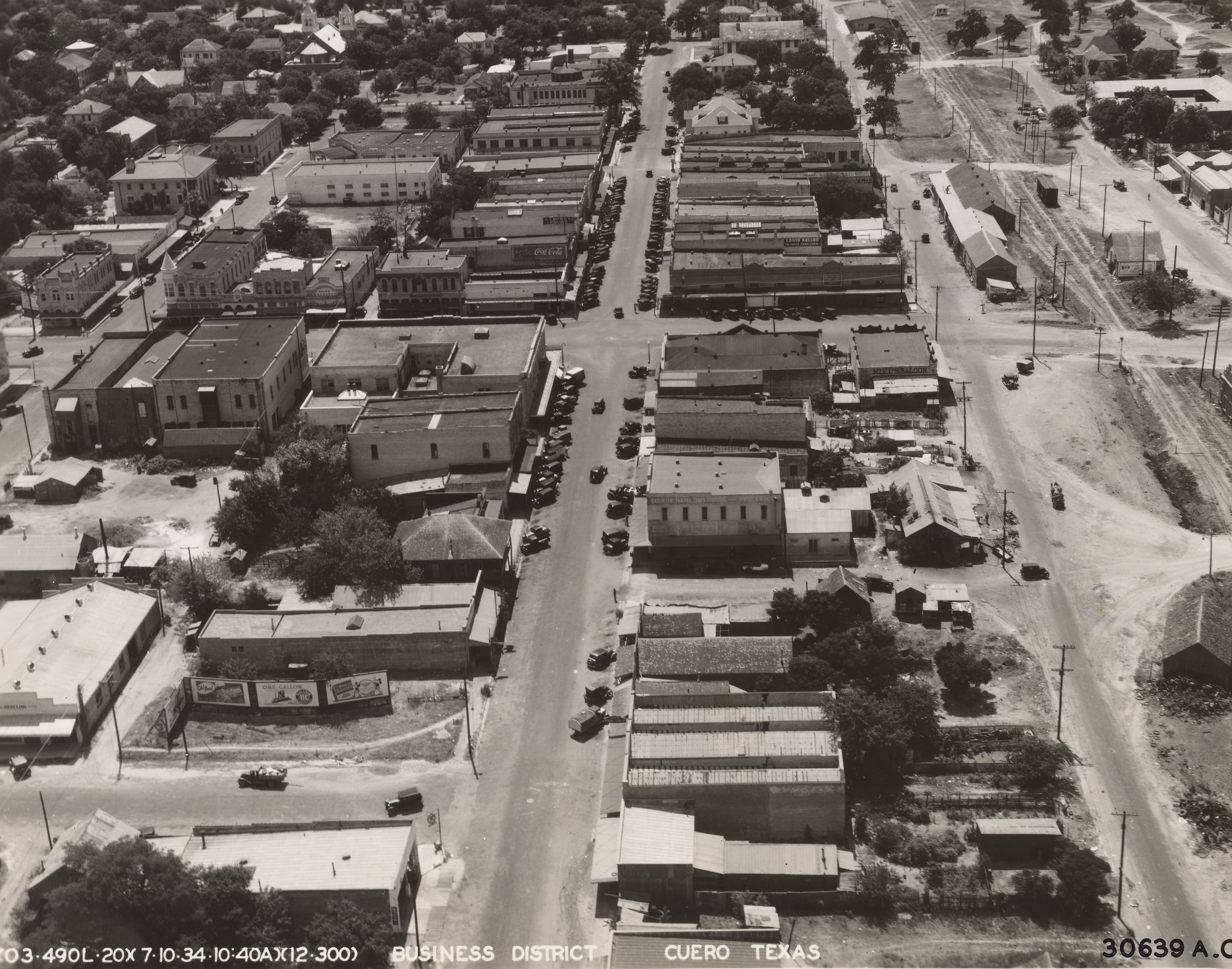
Downtown Cuero in 1934

=== 2020 census ===
As of the 2020 census, Cuero had a population of 8,128, 2,588 households, and 1,472 families. The median age was 39.1 years; 22.8% of residents were under the age of 18 and 15.7% were 65 years of age or older. For every 100 females there were 127.0 males, and for every 100 females age 18 and over there were 132.0 males.

Racial composition as of the 2020 census
Race	Number	Percent
White	4,213	51.8%
Black or African American	1,266	15.6%
American Indian and Alaska Native	49	0.6%
Asian	39	0.5%
Native Hawaiian and Other Pacific Islander	3	0.0%
Some other race	1,650	20.3%
Two or more races	908	11.2%
Hispanic or Latino (of any race)	3,640	44.8%

93.2% of residents lived in urban areas, while 6.8% lived in rural areas.

There were 2,588 households in Cuero, of which 35.4% had children under the age of 18 living in them. Of all households, 41.7% were married-couple households, 18.1% were households with a male householder and no spouse or partner present, and 33.3% were households with a female householder and no spouse or partner present. About 30.1% of all households were made up of individuals and 15.1% had someone living alone who was 65 years of age or older.

There were 3,071 housing units, of which 15.7% were vacant. The homeowner vacancy rate was 4.0% and the rental vacancy rate was 11.4%.

=== 2000 census ===
As of the 2000 census, 6,571 people, 2,500 households, and 1,695 families resided in the city. The population density was 1,331.1 inhabitants per square mile (513.9/km^{2}). The 2,867 housing units had an average density of 580.8 per sq mi (224.1/km^{2}). The racial makeup of the city was 67.25% White, 16.71% African American, 0.61% Native American, 0.52% Asian, 12.84% from other races, and 2.07% from two or more races. Hispanics or Latinos of any race were 34.73% of the population.

Of the 2,500 households, 33.0% had children under the age of 18 living with them, 47.2% were married couples living together, 16.0% had a female householder with no husband present, and 32.2% were not families. About 29.2% of all households were made up of individuals, and 16.6% had someone living alone who was 65 years of age or older. The average household size was 2.54 and the average family size was 3.13.

In the city, the age distribution was 27.1% under 18, 8.5% from 18 to 24, 24.4% from 25 to 44, 20.3% from 45 to 64, and 19.7% who were 65 or older. The median age was 38 years. For every 100 women, there were 86.1 men. For every 100 women age 18 and over, there were 80.6 men.

The median income for a household in the city was $24,931, and for a family was $29,500. Men had a median income of $26,154 versus $16,551 for women. The per capita income for the city was $14,286. About 21.5% of families and 26.8% of the population were below the poverty line, including 34.6% of those under age 18 and 20.1% of those age 65 or over.

== Arts and culture ==
Turkey Fest is a local festival during which the townsfolk compete with people at various turkey-centric events. The competitions revolve around the turkeys each town raises and in which each takes immense pride. The events are the prettiest turkey contest, turkey toss, turkey trot, and turkey race. Unlike most turkey trots, where humans do the racing, in Cuero, the "turkey trot" involves racing actual turkeys.

In 1972, Charles Kuralt did an "On the Road" report for CBS News from Cuero, where he did his own turkey call.

Christmas in Cuero began in 2000 with the lighting of the gazebo in Cuero Municipal Park. It has grown to over 100 displays of Victorian and Western scenes, 12-car trains, gingerbread houses, and other scenes. A live nativity scene is sponsored by a church in Cuero. Two of the scenes were vandalized by two teens in November 2009. The park was still open to the public, excluding the two damaged scenes. The teens arrested for the crime had their bonds set at $150,000, in part because of the effect the crime had on the community.

== Parks and recreation ==
Cuero has many places for recreation, including a baseball complex, a golf course, volleyball courts, tennis courts, a basketball pavilion, and a park area with access to public swimming pool.

== Education ==
The City of Cuero is served by the Cuero Independent School District. John C. French serves prekindergarten 4 through grade 2, Hunt Elementary serves grades 3–5, Cuero Junior High serves grades 6–8, and Cuero High School serves grades 9–12.

In addition, the City of Cuero is served by St. Michael's Catholic School. Providing education for the children of DeWitt County for over 130 years, the school has a fully accredited early childhood program (prekindergarten to grade 4) and offers education for kindergarten-grade 6.

== Museums and historic sites ==
Cuero has the Chisholm Trail Heritage Museum, the Cuero Heritage Museum, the Pharmacy and Medical Museum of Texas (now a separate location of the Cuero Heritage Museum), and the DeWitt County Historical Museum.

Numerous sites in Cuero are on the National Register of Historic Places listings in DeWitt County, Texas, including (but not limited to) the Cuero Commercial Historic District, the First Methodist Church, the Grace Episcopal Church, the Macedonia Baptist Church, and the Terrell-Reuss Streets Historic District.

== Notable people ==
- Frank Bass, professor and inventor of the Bass diffusion model
- MSG Roy Benavidez, Medal of Honor recipient
- Alois Blackwell, NFL player
- Robert E. Blake, lawyer and athlete
- Guy Cordon, United States Senator of Oregon from 1944 to 1955
- Leo Frank, lynching victim
- Christopher A. Fuchs, physicist
- Fred Hansen, Olympic champion pole vaulter
- Frank Horton, U.S. Congressman for New York
- Henry Joseph Huck (1822–1905), once "the leading lumberman and supplier of building materials in the young State of Texas" and the first judge of Calhoun County, Texas,
- Caesar Kleberg, conservationist
- Barr McClellan, lawyer, author (Blood, Money & Power: How LBJ Killed JFK), entrepreneur
- Jo Morrow, television and film actress
- Sam Neely (1948–2006), country/folk musician and writer
- Aurora Estrada Orozco (1918–2011), Mexican-American community leader
- Robert Strait, high-school football running back
- Cody Wallace, NFL player
- Mary Fanett Wheeler, mathematician
- Arthur Whittington, NFL player
- Jordan Whittington, NFL player
- Dale Murray, MLB pitcher

== See also ==
- Terrell–Reuss Streets Historic District
