= Giuseppe Telfener =

Italian businessman and politician

- Born: May 26, 1839; Foggia, Italy
- Died: January 1, 1898 (aged 58); Torre del Greco, Italy
- Education: Mathematics, University of Naples
- Occupations: Businessman, politician

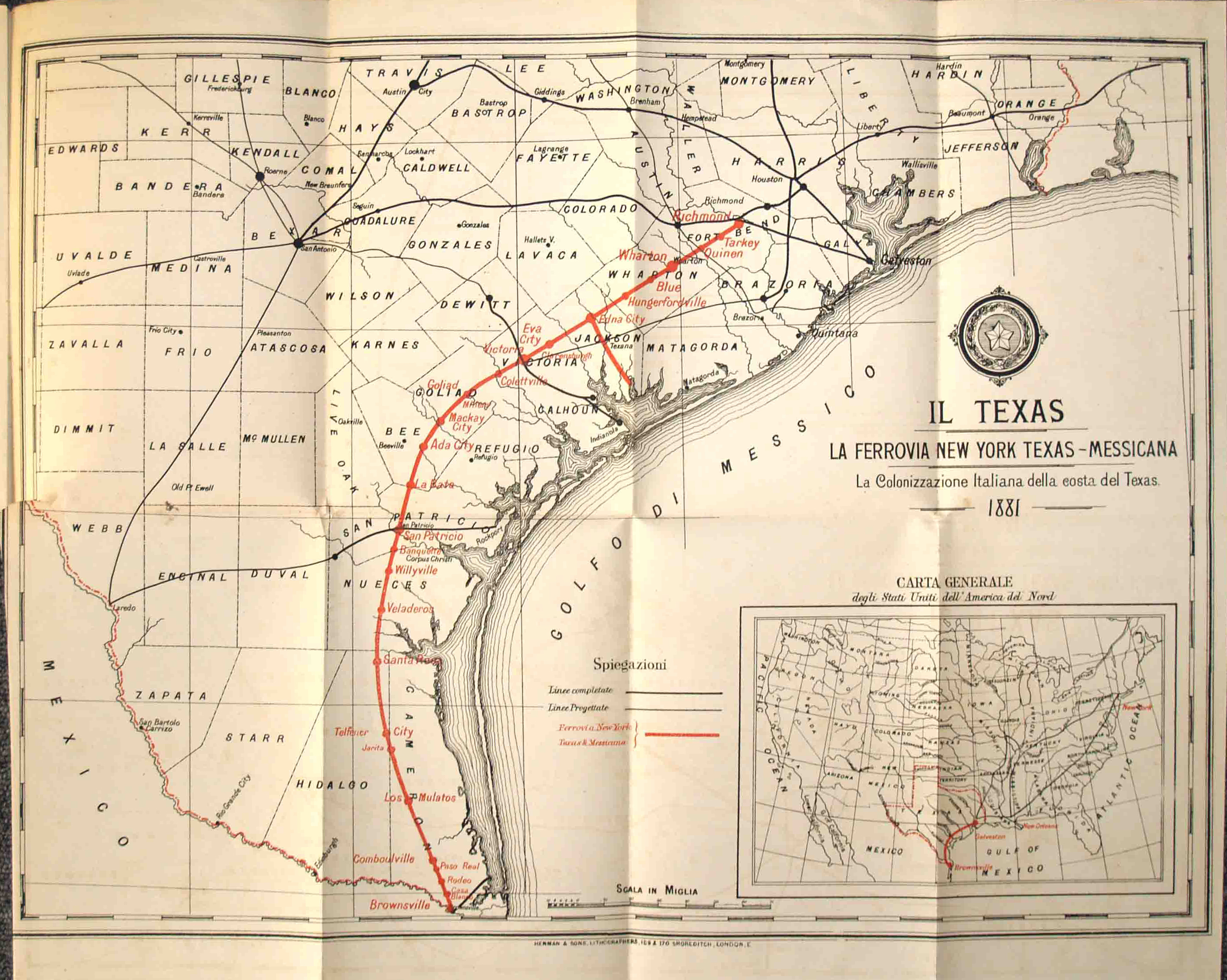
Telfener's 1881 map of the New York, Texas and Mexican Railway Company

Giuseppe Telfener or Joseph Telfener, created Count Telfener (Foggia, May 26, 1839 – Torre del Greco, January 1, 1898) was an Italian businessman and politician, now better known for being one of the richest Italian entrepreneurs, administrator of the assets of the House of Savoy and worldwide railway developer.

Born into a merchant family from Val Gardena who then moved to Foggia, he studied mathematics at the University of Naples and began working with some of the leading Italian railway engineers. He soon went to Argentina and here he distinguished himself for having snatched the contract for the construction of railways from the Anglo-American monopoly and for having built the longest railway line in Latin America of the time. Count Telfener was the president and one of the builders of the New York, Texas and Mexican Railway, now known as the Macaroni Line.

In Rome he became the owner of Villa Ada (to honor the name of his wife, Ada Hungerford, 1857-1910), a residence with the second largest private park of the city. It became in 1904 the private but main residence of King Victor Emmanuel III and the Royal Family.

He was also a member of the Chamber of Deputies, the lower house of the Parliament of the Kingdom of Italy.
