= Cuero Independent School District =

School district in Texas, United States

Address
- 960 East Broadway Cuero, Texas, 77954; United States

District information
- Schools: 4
- NCES District ID: 4815960

Students and staff
- Students: 1,905
- Teachers: 157.56 (on an FTE basis)
- Student–teacher ratio: 12.09:1

Cuero Independent School District is a public school district based in Cuero, Texas, United States.

Located in DeWitt County, a small portion of the district extends into Gonzales County.

Middle- and high-school students from the community of Nursery may choose between Victoria or Cuero ISD. Because of this, the district also serves some residents from Victoria County. In 2009, the school district was rated "academically acceptable" by the Texas Education Agency.

== Schools ==
- Cuero High School (grades 9-12)
- Cuero Junior High School (grades 6-8)
- Hunt Elementary School (grades 2-5)
- French Elementary School (prekindergarten-grade 1)
