= Texas State Highway 111 =

State highway in Texas

State Highway 111
- SH 111, highlighted in red

Route information
- Maintained by TxDOT
- Length: 76.23 mi (122.68 km)
- Existed: by 1933–present

Major junctions
- West end: US 183 / SH 97 at Gonzales
- US 77 Alt. at Yoakum; US 77 near Yoakum; Future I-69 / US 59 at Edna
- East end: SH 71 at Midfield

Location
- Country: United States
- State: Texas

Highway system
- Highways in Texas; Interstate; US; State; Former; Toll; Loops; Spurs; FM/RM; Park; Rec
← SH 110	→ SH 112

State Highway 111 (SH 111) is a state highway that runs from Gonzales to Midfield in the southeastern region of the U.S. state of Texas.

== Route description ==
SH 111 begins at a junction with U.S. Route 183 (US 183) in the unincorporated community of Hochheim. Officially, the route extends northwest with US 183 to Gonzales, but that portion is not currently measured or mapped as part of the route and is not signed as such. The route travels east to Yoakum, crossing US 90 Alt., before traveling into downtown Yoakum. The route then turns southeast toward a junction with Future I-69/US 59 at Edna. The route then turns due east, crossing over Lake Texana, before reaching its terminus at SH 71 at Midfield.

== History ==
SH 111 was originally numbered on August 10, 1925 on a route beginning at Hallettsville, and travelling southeast to Edna and continuing to Lolita, before turning east to SH 59 east of Blessing, just south of Midfield, following the rail line of the St. Louis, Brownsville, and Mexico Railway. On September 17, 1930, the section from Francitas eastward was transferred to rerouted SH 58 (an alternate route to Ganado). On April 3, 1931, the section from Lolita to Francitas was cancelled, and SH 111 was rerouted southward before reaching Blessing to end at SH 57 in Weedhaven. On January 20, 1932, SH 111 was rerouted through Ganado (replacing the alternate route of SH 58), and extended south from SH 57 to Olivia. On August 2, 1932, it was rerouted back to its previous route to Edna, and the old route to Ganado was redesignated as SH 172. On October 26, 1932, the route was conditionally designated over most of that routing, with an extension from Hallettsville west to Gonzales. On September 18, 1933, a section from Hallettsville to Eagle Lake was added, and the section from Hallettsville to Edna was cancelled. On November 22, 1933, the road from Gonzales to Eagle Lake was renumbered as SH 200. On January 9, 1934, the routing was redesignated over its current routing from Midfield to Edna (with part the old route being transferred to an extension of SH 172). On October 22, 1935, SH 111 was planned to be extended to Yoakum, and the extension was designated on September 21, 1937. On September 26, 1939, SH 111 was extended west to Hochheim over a section of SH 95. The route was not completed between Yoakum and Edna until the late 1940s. On October 4, 1968, SH 111 was extended north to Gonzales concurrent with US 183.

== Major intersections ==
County	Location	mi	km	Destinations	Notes
Gonzales	Gonzales	0.00	0.00	US 183 north / SH 97 – Luling, Nixon	Western end of US 183 concurrency SH 111 is unsigned along this concurrency
DeWitt	Hochheim			US 183 south – Cuero	Eastern end of US 183 concurrency Western terminus of signed portion of SH 111
DeWitt	Yoakum			US 77 Alt. – Cuero, Hallettsville	
DeWitt	Yoakum			Bus. US 77 Alt. north (Irvine Street)	Northern end of Bus. US 77 concurrency
DeWitt	Yoakum			Bus. US 77 Alt. south (Irvine Street)	Southern end of Bus. US 77 concurrency
Lavaca				US 77 – Victoria, Hallettsville	
Jackson	Edna			Future I-69 / US 59 – Victoria, El Campo, Houston	I-69/US 59 exit 25; Diamond interchange with frontage roads; US 59 is the future I-69
Jackson	Edna			Loop 521 (Main Street)	
Jackson				SH 172 – La Ward, Ganado	
Matagorda	Midfield			SH 71 – El Campo	
1.000 mi = 1.609 km; 1.000 km = 0.621 mi: Concurrency terminus
