= National Register of Historic Places listings in Jackson County, Texas =

Location of Jackson County in Texas

This is a list of the National Register of Historic Places listings in Jackson County, Texas.

This is intended to be a complete list of properties listed on the National Register of Historic Places in Jackson County, Texas. There are four properties listed on the National Register in the county. One property is also a Recorded Texas Historic Landmark.

This National Park Service list is complete through NPS recent listings posted March 21, 2025.

== Current listings ==
The publicly disclosed locations of National Register properties may be seen in a mapping service provided.

	Name on the Register	Image	Date listed	Location	City or town	Description
1	Allen Memorial Presbyterian Church	Allen Memorial Presbyterian Church	June 7, 2016 (#16000351)	301 W. Church St. 28°58′29″N 96°38′46″W	Edna	
2	Archeological Site No. 41JK9	Archeological Site No. 41JK9	August 19, 1994 (#94000833)	Address restricted	Lolita	Wreck of the sidewheel steamer Mary Summers on the Navidad River
3	Edna Theatre	Edna Theatre	September 8, 2011 (#11000652)	201 West Main Street; 28°58′41″N 96°38′52″W	Edna	
4	Jackson County Monument	Jackson County Monument	April 19, 2018 (#100002350)	115 W Main St. 28°58′40″N 96°38′49″W	Edna	
5	Texana Presbyterian Church	Texana Presbyterian Church	September 12, 1979 (#79002982)	Lake Texana Park; 28°56′36″N 96°32′20″W	Edna	Recorded Texas Historic Landmark; relocated from Edna to Brackenridge Recreational Complex in 2001

== See also ==
- National Register of Historic Places listings in Texas
- Recorded Texas Historic Landmarks in Jackson County
