= Texas State Highway 172 =

State highway in Texas

State Highway 172
- SH 172, highlighted in red

Route information
- Maintained by TxDOT
- Length: 28.471 mi (45.820 km)
- Existed: 1932–present

Major junctions
- South end: Local road in Olivia
- SH 35 in Weedhaven; SH 111 in Crossroads
- North end: Loop 522 / FM 710 in Ganado

Location
- Country: United States
- State: Texas
- Counties: Calhoun, Jackson

Highway system
- Highways in Texas; Interstate; US; State; Former; Toll; Loops; Spurs; FM/RM; Park; Rec
| ← SH 171 | → SH 173 |

State Highway 172 (SH 172) is a state highway in Texas that connects Ganado to Olivia on the Gulf Coast.

== Route description ==
State maintenance and the SH 172 designation begin along the shore of Keller Bay in the Calhoun County community of Olivia. The route travels northward along the peninsula and into Jackson County, where it intersects SH 35 in the hamlet of Weedhaven. SH 172 continues to the north and has a brief concurrency FM 616 in La Ward before turning slightly to the northwest. It has a junction with SH 111 before entering Ganado along 3rd Street. The SH 172 designation ends at Loop 522, the former route of US 59 through the city; 3rd Street continues northward as FM 710.

== History ==
SH 172 was originally designated on August 2, 1932 from Ganado to La Ward. On January 9, 1934, the route was extended to Olivia, replacing part of SH 111, which was rerouted further north.

== Major intersections ==
| County | Location | mi | km | Destinations | Notes |
|---|---|---|---|---|---|
| Calhoun | Olivia | 0.0 | 0.0 | Local road along Keller Bay | Southern terminus, state maintenance ends |
| Calhoun | | 1.6 | 2.6 | Spur 159 – Port Alto | |
| Calhoun | | 3.6 | 5.8 | FM 2143 | |
| Jackson | Weedhaven | 6.0 | 9.7 | SH 35 – Port Lavaca, Palacios | |
| Jackson | La Ward | 14.3 | 23.0 | FM 616 east – Blessing | South end of FM 616 concurrency |
| Jackson | La Ward | 14.3 | 23.0 | FM 616 west – Lolita | North end of FM 616 concurrency |
| Jackson | | 17.3 | 27.8 | FM 3131 – Red Bluff | |
| Jackson | | 19.5 | 31.4 | FM 1823 | |
| Jackson | Crossroads | 21.8 | 35.1 | SH 111 – Edna, Midfield | |
| Jackson | | 26.2 | 42.2 | FM 1683 | |
| Jackson | Ganado | 28.3 | 45.5 | FM 1157 | |
| Jackson | Ganado | 28.5 | 45.9 | Loop 522 to Future I-69 / US 59 / FM 710 – Houston, Victoria | Exit 46 on I-69/US 59; northern terminus |
1.000 mi = 1.609 km; 1.000 km = 0.621 mi
