= Texana Presbyterian Church =

Historic church in Texas, United States

- U.S. National Register of Historic Places
- Recorded Texas Historic Landmark
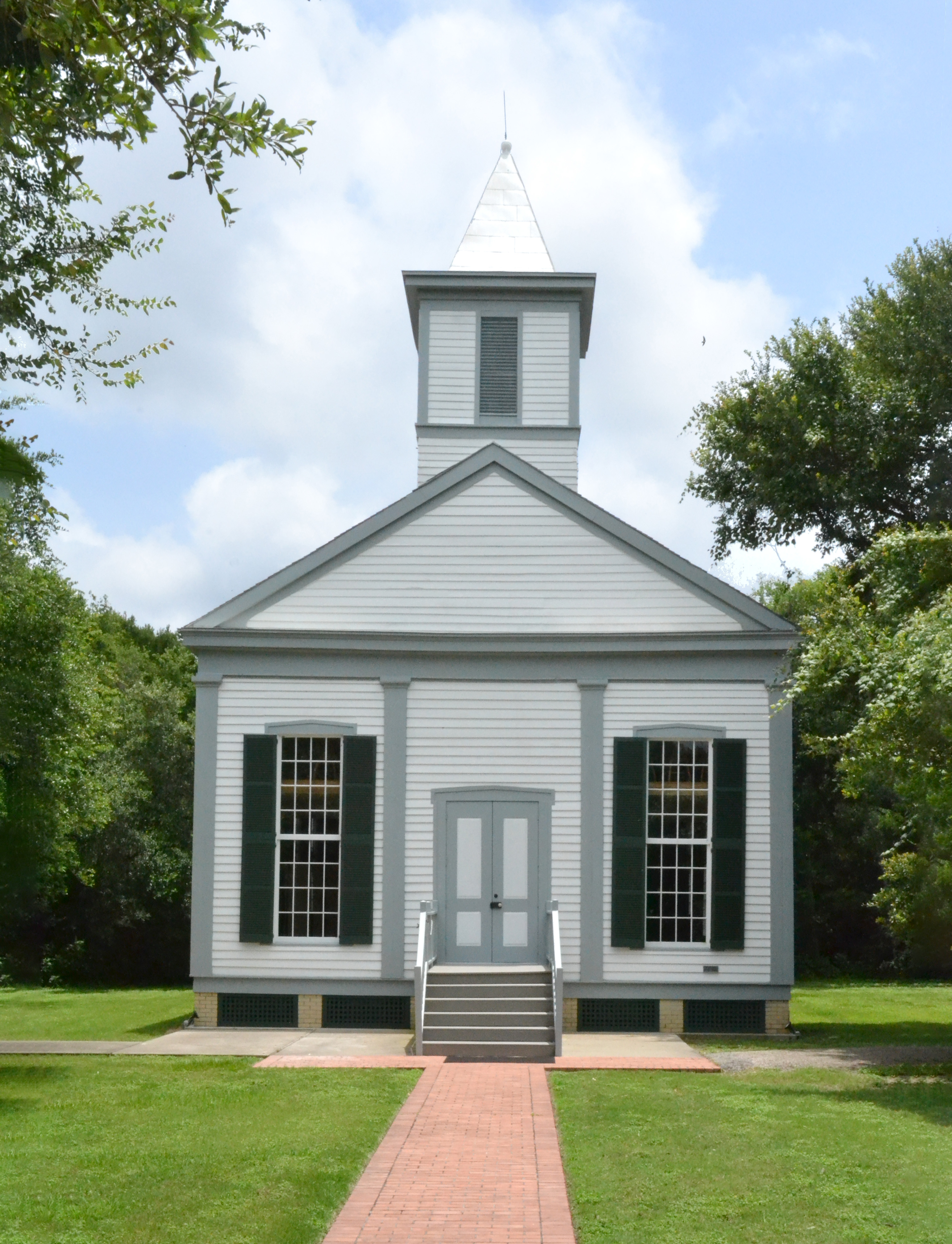
- Texana Church in 2016

- Location within Texas Location within the United States
- Location: Brackenridge Pkwy., Brackenridge Recreation Complex
- Coordinates: 28°56′36″N 96°32′20″W
- Area: less than one acre
- Built: 1860
- Architectural style: Greek Revival
- NRHP reference No.: 79002982
- RTHL No.: 5238

Significant dates
- Added to NRHP: September 12, 1979
- Designated RTHL: 1981

Texana Presbyterian Church is a historic church in Brackenridge Recreation Complex outside of Edna, Texas.

The church was originally built in 1859 in the former town of Texana. The church was relocated to Edna in 1884 where it was situated at the intersection of Apollo Drive and Country Club Lane. In 2001, the church was again moved to its present location along Brackenridge Parkway near Lake Texana and restored.

The church was added to the National Register of Historic Places in 1979 and designated a Recorded Texas Historic Landmark in 1981.

== See also ==
- National Register of Historic Places listings in Jackson County, Texas
- Recorded Texas Historic Landmarks in Jackson County
