= Texana, Texas =

- Ghost town
- Location of Texana, Texas Texana, Texas (the United States)
- Coordinates: 28.91°N 96.56°W
- Country: United States
- State: Texas
- County: Jackson County
- Santa Anna: 1832
- Founder: Francis F. Wells; Pamelia McNutt Porter
- Time zone: UTC−06:00 (CST)
  - Summer (DST): UTC−05:00 (CDT)

Texana is a ghost town which was located in Jackson County, Texas, United States, near Edna. The community was one of the earliest Anglo-American settlements in the state. The town flourished as late as 1880, but when the railroad bypassed the town, it rapidly declined. The site was flooded a century later by the Lake Texana reservoir.

== History ==
In 1832 Dr. Francis F. Wells and his sister-in-law, Pamelia McNutt Porter, founded a community in south central Jackson County that later developed into Texana. The village was originally named Santa Anna after Antonio López de Santa Anna, at the time a popular Mexican liberal, soldier, and politician. In 1835, however, after Santa Anna had proven himself an enemy of republican government, the residents of the settlement changed the name to Texana. During the Texas Revolution of 1835-1836, Texana served as a port of entry and training camp for many volunteers from the United States. Dr. Jack Shackelford's company of Alabama Red Rovers camped around Texana for about two weeks before joining James Fannin's command at Goliad. In the spring of 1836 the citizens of Texana joined the Runaway Scrape. "Uncle" Jeff Parson, a slave during the Runaway Scrape, told how the "old town of Texana was abandoned, not an individual was left on Jackson County soil, all were in flight, where they were going no one knew."

After the Battle of San Jacinto, when republic officials organized the surrounding area into Jackson County, Texana - one of the oldest Anglo-American settlements - served as county seat. In the summer of 1836 the Army of the Republic of Texas established Camp Independence on acreage belonging to Captain Sylvanus Hatch about four or five miles from Texana. The next year Camp Independence was the site of the famous duel between Felix Huston and Albert Sidney Johnston. That year also saw a public sale of town lots that encouraged settlement. In 1840 Texana incorporated as a municipality. By 1880 the town had acquired regular steamboat service, mail and stage routes, a booming business section, and its own newspaper, the Clarion. As late as 1882 Texana was a thriving port with as many as twenty ships docking each week. In 1883, however, the New York, Texas and Mexican Railway bypassed the settlement, precipitating a sharp decline. Shortly thereafter county voters elected to make Edna the county seat, and by 1884 Texana was a virtual ghost town.

== Lake Texana ==
Lake Texana, a reservoir on the Navidad River, covers the ghost town, as a result of the construction of the Palmetto Bend Dam, which was finished in 1979. The lake serves as a recreational destination for visitors. The dam and the lake are managed by the Lavaca-Navidad River Authority.

== Texas Historical Commission Site ==
Texana, Texas received a Texas historical maker in 1936 at the threshold of the Texas Gulf Coast. The Texas Historical Commission acknowledged the 1832 settlement in Mexican Texas with a 1936 Texas Centennial Marker made of gray granite with a bronze inscription.

The geographic coordinates place the in situ of the Texas Centennial marker at the access entrance to the Lavaca-Navidad River Authority.

== See also ==
Brackenridge Recreation Complex
