= Calvin Hunt (American football) =

American football player (born 1947)

No. 54, 51, 52
- Position: Center

Personal information
- Born: December 31, 1947 (age 78); Oceanside, California, U.S.
- Listed height: 6 ft 3 in (1.91 m)
- Listed weight: 245 lb (111 kg)

Career information
- High school: Edna (Edna, Texas)
- College: Baylor
- NFL draft: 1970: 11th round, 261 (By the Pittsburgh Steelers)th overall pick

Career history
- Philadelphia Eagles (1970); Houston Oilers (1972–1973)

Awards and highlights
- First-team All-SWC (1968)

Career NFL statistics
- Games played: 21
- Games started: 10
- Fumble recoveries: 3
- Stats at Pro Football Reference

Calvin Cornelius Hunt (born December 31, 1947) is an American former professional football player. He played center one season for the National Football League (NFL)'s Philadelphia Eagles in 1970 and two for the Houston Oilers from 1972 to 1973.

Born in Oceanside, California but raised in Edna, Texas, Hunt played at Edna High School for coach Allen Boren. Following graduation in 1966, Hunt attended Baylor University, where he played for John Bridgers the first three years, and for Bill Beall during his senior year.

Hunt was selected 261st overall (11th round) in the 1970 NFL draft by the Pittsburgh Steelers, but made his debut for the Philadelphia Eagles. Leaving the team after one season, Hunt later played two years for the Houston Oilers.
