= Lavaca, Texas =

Lavaca, Texas may refer to the following places along the Lavaca River

- Port Lavaca, Texas, formerly called simply "Lavaca"
- Lavaca County, Texas
