= Industrial High School =

Industrial High School may refer to:

- Industrial High School (West Palm Beach, Florida), US
- Industrial High School (Vanderbilt, Texas), US
- Industrial High School (Old Mineral House) in Brisbane, Australia
