= La Salle, Jackson County, Texas =

Unincorporated community in Texas, US

La Salle is an unincorporated community in Jackson County, Texas, United States. According to the Handbook of Texas, the community had an estimated population of 103 in 2000.

== Geography ==
La Salle is located at 28°47′30″N 96°40′09″W (28.7916577, -96.6691449). It is situated along FM 616 in southwestern Jackson County, approximately 16 miles south of Edna and 22 miles east of Victoria.

== History ==
In 1875, J.M. Bennett and brothers Sol and Ike West founded a cattle ranch at the site. The Missouri Pacific Railroad passed through the property in 1909. The three associates named the station Benwest, after the surnames of the owners. The name was changed to Bennview when the West brothers withdrew from the partnership in 1922. A town site was surveyed in 1924 and Bennett promoted a land sale that attracted a number of Poles and Czechs to the community. A post office was established at Bennview in 1928 and remained operational until 1930. Seven years later, citizens changed the name from Bennview to La Salle in recognition of the French colonization of Texas that existed in the area in the 17th century, and a new post office opened along with a school and general store. La Salle's population rose from an estimated 60 residents in 1941 to just over 100 by the early 1970s. Thereafter, the community experienced a period of decline. The population fell to 75 in the late 1980s and remained at that level until 2000, when the number of inhabitants rose to approximately 103.

La Salle has a post office with the ZIP code 77969.

== Education ==
Public education in the community of La Salle is provided by the Industrial Independent School District.
