= La Ward, Texas =

- City
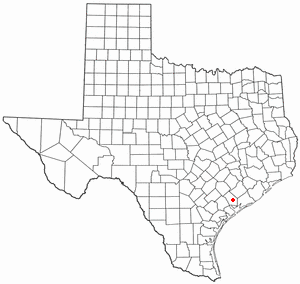
- Location of La Ward, Texas

- Coordinates: 28°50′42″N 96°27′56″W
- Country: United States of America
- State: Texas
- County: Jackson

Area
  - Total: 0.81 sq mi (2.10 km^{2})
  - Land: 0.81 sq mi (2.10 km^{2})
  - Water: 0 sq mi (0.00 km^{2})
- Elevation: 39 ft (12 m)

Population (2020)
  - Total: 176
  - Density: 217/sq mi (83.8/km^{2})
- Time zone: UTC-6 (Central (CST))
  - Summer (DST): UTC-5 (CDT)
- ZIP code: 77970
- Area code: 361
- FIPS code: 48-41848
- GNIS feature ID: 1360808

La Ward is a city in Jackson County, Texas, United States. The population was 176 at the 2020 census.

== Geography ==
La Ward is located at 28°50′42″N 96°27′56″W (28.845036, –96.465659), at the junction of State Highway 172 and FM 616 in southern Jackson County, 14 miles (23 km) south of Ganado and 17 miles (27 km) southeast of Edna, the county seat. The nearest large city is Victoria, 40 miles (64 km) west of La Ward.

The U.S. Census Bureau lists the total city area at 0.81 square miles (2.1 km^{2}), all land.

== History ==
The community emerged on the coastal prairie in 1904 with the arrival of the St. Louis, Brownsville and Mexico Railway. It was named for Lafayette Ward, a local person who became a leader in introducing Hereford, Brahman, and Jersey cattle to Texas. By 1914, La Ward had developed into a cattle and shipping center. The community had its own independent school district and an estimated population of 200 in 1940. That number would rise to around 300 by the early 1960s. La Ward's population declined to 247 in 1970, to 218 in 1980, and to 162 in 1990. It increased to 200 in 2000, a 23 percent increase over the 1990 figure.

== Demographics ==
Historical population
Census	Pop.	Note	%±
1970	247		—
1980	218		−11.7%
1990	162		−25.7%
2000	200		23.5%
2010	213		6.5%
2020	176		−17.4%
U.S. Decennial Census; 2020 Census

=== 2020 census ===
As of the 2020 census, La Ward had a population of 176. The median age was 37.0 years. 26.7% of residents were under the age of 18 and 15.9% of residents were 65 years of age or older. For every 100 females there were 91.3 males, and for every 100 females age 18 and over there were 89.7 males age 18 and over.

0.0% of residents lived in urban areas, while 100.0% lived in rural areas.

There were 60 households in La Ward, of which 46.7% had children under the age of 18 living in them. Of all households, 68.3% were married-couple households, 11.7% were households with a male householder and no spouse or partner present, and 13.3% were households with a female householder and no spouse or partner present. About 6.6% of all households were made up of individuals and 1.7% had someone living alone who was 65 years of age or older.

There were 67 housing units, of which 10.4% were vacant. The homeowner vacancy rate was 2.0% and the rental vacancy rate was 0.0%.

Racial composition as of the 2020 census
Race	Number	Percent
White	132	75.0%
Black or African American	2	1.1%
American Indian and Alaska Native	0	0.0%
Asian	1	0.6%
Native Hawaiian and Other Pacific Islander	0	0.0%
Some other race	18	10.2%
Two or more races	23	13.1%
Hispanic or Latino (of any race)	69	39.2%

=== 2000 census ===
As of the 2000 census there were 200 people, 63 households, and 50 families residing in the city. The population density was 245.8 inhabitants per square mile (94.9/km^{2}). There were 79 housing units at an average density of 97.1 per square mile (37.5/km^{2}). The racial makeup of the city was 86.00% White, 1.00% Native American, 12.50% from other races, and 0.50% from two or more races. Hispanic or Latino of any race were 32.50% of the population.

There were 63 households, 42.9% of which had children age 17 or younger, 66.7% were married couples living together, 6.3% had a female householder with no husband present, and 20.6% were non-families. 17.5% of all households were made up of individuals, and 12.7% had someone living alone who was 65 years of age or older. The average household size was 3.17 and the average family size was 3.66.

In the city, the population was spread out, with 32.0% under the age of 18, 9.5% from 18 to 24, 29.5% from 25 to 44, 16.0% from 45 to 64, and 13.0% who were 65 years of age or older. The median age was 32 years. For every 100 females, there were 83.5 males. For every 100 females age 18 and over, there were 83.8 males.

The median income for a household in the city was $26,250, and the median income for a family was $45,833. Males had a median income of $33,750 versus $23,750 for females. The per capita income for the city was $15,633. About 5.2% of families and 6.8% of the population were below the poverty line, including 6.5% of those under the age of eighteen and 4.9% of those 65 or over.

== Education ==
Public education in the city of La Ward is provided by the Industrial Independent School District. The district has served La Ward since its creation in 1949.
