= Chicolete Creek =

River in Texas, United States

Coordinates: 29°05′08″N 96°49′04″W

Chicolete Creek is a stream in the U.S. state of Texas. It is a tributary to the Lavaca River.

Chicolete is a name derived from Spanish meaning "chocolate".

== See also ==
- List of rivers of Texas
