= Weedhaven, Texas =

Rural unincorporated community in Jackson County, Texas

Weedhaven
- Unincorporated community
- Interactive map of Weedhaven
- Location within Texas Weedhaven (the United States)
- Coordinates: 28°43′26″N 96°27′13″W
- Country: United States
- State: Texas
- County: Jackson County

Weedhaven is a rural unincorporated community located at the intersection of Texas State Highway 35 and Texas State Highway 172 in Jackson County, Texas, United States.

== History ==
The area belonged to a man named J.F. Weed after being sold to him by the McHaney family, who owned a ranch on the site. In the 1940s, the crossroads on that site was named Weedhaven, after the Weed family. In the 1950s, Weedhaven served tourists travelling between Houston and Corpus Christi, featuring a cafe, a motel, a grocery store, icehouse, and gas station owned by George McHaney, the son of the original ranch owner, C. C. McHaney.

There were 35 people reported living in Weedhaven in the year 2000, and by that time only a few scattered homes is what remained of the community.
