= Navidad River =

River in the Texas Gulf Coastal Plain

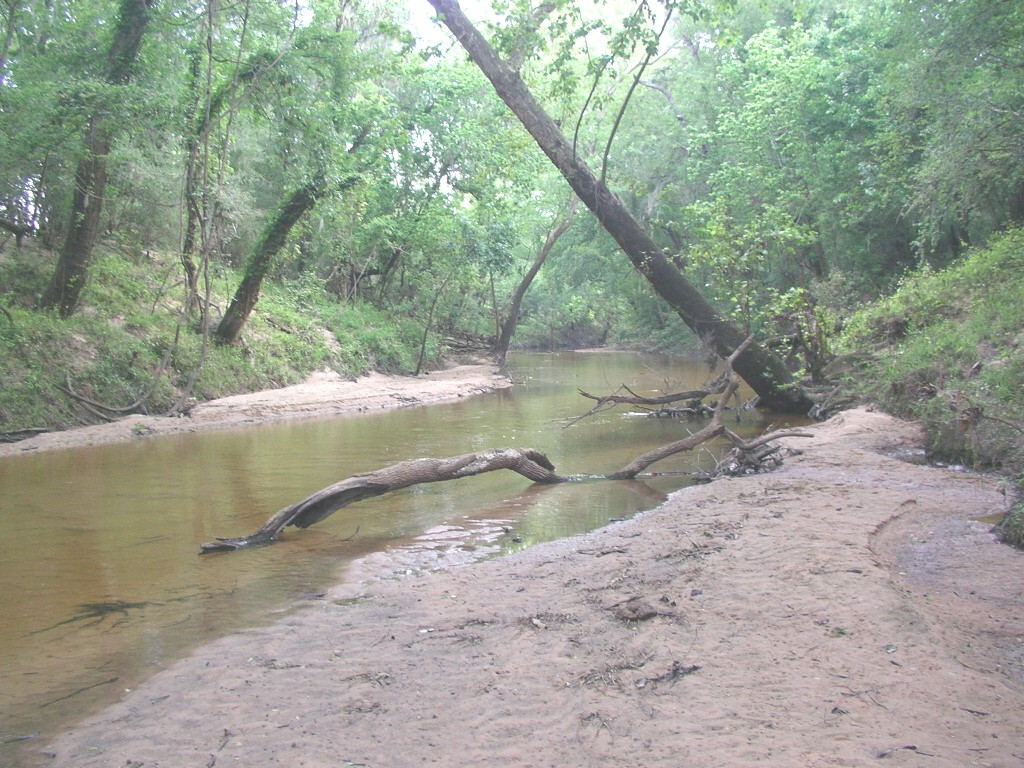
- Navidad River and Upstream Sight

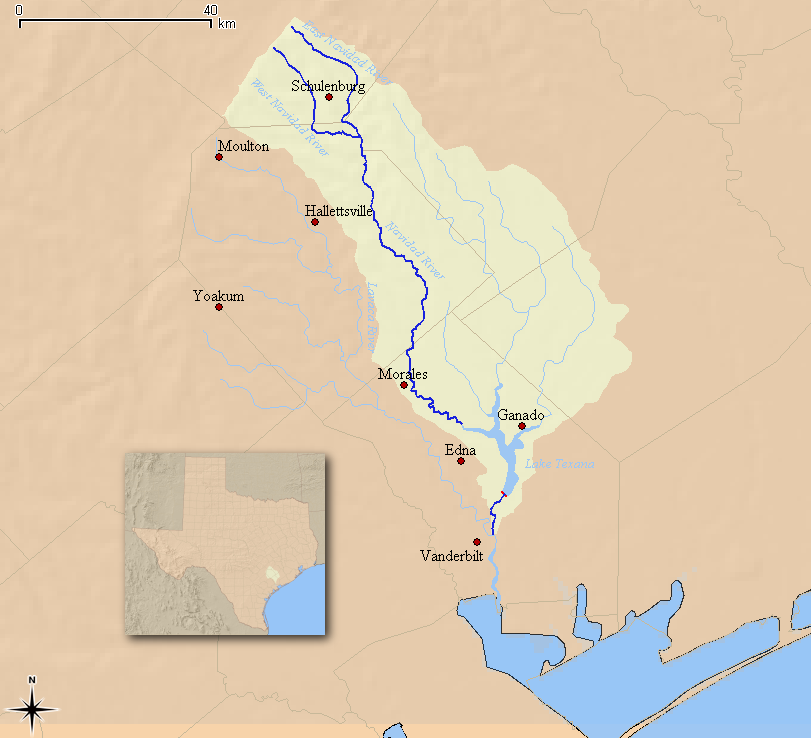
- Map of Navidad River and Watershed

- Location in Texas Navidad River (the United States)

Location
- Counties: Colorado County; Fayette County; Jackson County
- State: Texas
- Country: United States

Physical characteristics
- Source: Schulenburg, Texas
  - location: Victoria Division
  - coordinates: 29.70162°N 96.95387°W
  - elevation: 269.03 ft (82.00 m)
- Mouth: Lolita, Texas
  - location: Victoria Division
  - coordinates: 28.83388°N 96.57886°W
  - elevation: 3.3 ft (1.0 m)
- Length: 90 mi (140 km)

Basin features
- Waterbodies: Lavaca Bay; Matagorda Bay; Gulf of Mexico
- Bridges: East Navidad River Bridge

The Navidad River is a 90-mile (140 km)-long coastal river in the U.S. state of Texas that runs roughly parallel to its sister river, the Lavaca River. It is not spring fed, and all of its volume is runoff, which eventually provides for much of the water in Lake Texana.

== Course ==
The river begins with two primary branches. The East Navidad River begins in southern Fayette County and runs southeast until it reaches Colorado County. The West Navidad River also begins in Fayette County and wanders south for 23 miles to its confluence with the East Navidad near Oakland, where they become the Navidad River. The town of Schulenburg is centered between the two branches, which are both somewhat seasonal, and navigation can be difficult due to low water levels and obstructions.

The river then winds south, passing the small communities of Sublime, Speaks, and Morales and then feeding Lake Texana about 7 miles east of Edna. Beyond the lake, the river continues south for a few miles and then reaches its mouth on the Lavaca River.

== Tributaries ==
Mustang Creek and Sandy Creek formerly emptied into the Navidad but now drain directly into Lake Texana.

== Economy ==
The entire watershed and associated water resources are managed by the Lavaca-Navidad River Authority, which was established in 1941.

== Fame ==
The Navidad River is best known for being the territory of the legendary Wild Man of the Navidad, which many believe to be the first Bigfoot sightings in Texas. The creature was first widely reported in 1837 throughout the early settlements along the Navidad River bottoms, near the modern-day town of Sublime, in Lavaca County.

The river's notoriety was increased even more after IFC Films released the horror film titled The Wild Man of the Navidad in 2009. Although the movie was set in the real-life town of Sublime, it was actually shot south of the area in Whitsett, Texas.

== See also ==
- List of rivers of Texas
