= Brackenridge Recreation Complex =

Park in Jackson County, Texas, United States

- Location within Texas
- Location: Jackson County, Texas
- Nearest city: Edna
- Coordinates: 28°57′42″N 96°32′56″W
- Area: 575 acres (233 ha)
- Established: 1981
- Governing body: Lavaca-Navidad River Authority

Brackenridge Recreation Complex is a park operated by the Lavaca-Navidad River Authority. The park is a former state park in Texas then known as Lake Texana State Park and is located near Edna in Jackson County, halfway between Houston and Corpus Christi on Lake Texana.

The park was acquired by the Texas Parks and Wildlife Department under a 50-year lease agreement with the United States Bureau of Reclamation/Lavaca-Navidad River Authority in 1977. The park opened in September 1981 and was operated as a state park until the TPWD terminated its lease on August 31, 2012, when the river authority assumed management.

The majority of the park consists of mixed oak and pecan woodlands. White-tailed deer, squirrels, rabbits, nine-banded armadillos, and raccoons are numerous. There are occasional bobcat and wild turkey sightings. American alligators are also found in the park.
