= Brandon Green =

American football player (born 1980)

No. 97, 93
- Position: Defensive end

Personal information
- Born: September 5, 1980 (age 46); Victoria, Texas, U.S.
- Listed height: 6 ft 3 in (1.91 m)
- Listed weight: 250 lb (113 kg)

Career information
- High school: Industrial (Vanderbilt, Texas)
- College: Rice
- NFL draft: 2003: 6th round, 176th overall pick

Career history
- Jacksonville Jaguars (2003–2004); St. Louis Rams (2005–2006); Seattle Seahawks (2007)*
- * Offseason or practice squad member only

Awards and highlights
- 2× First-team All-WAC (2001, 2002)

Career NFL statistics
- Tackles: 59
- Sacks: 3.5
- Forced fumbles: 1
- Stats at Pro Football Reference

Brandon Green (born September 5, 1980) is an American former professional football player who was a defensive end in the National Football League (NFL). He played college football for the Rice Owls and was selected by the Jacksonville Jaguars in the 6th round of the 2003 NFL draft.

== Early life ==
Green was a four-year starter at Industrial High School in Vanderbilt, Texas. As a senior, earned first-team Class 3A all-state, all-district, and All-county honors at tight end. Also made 43 tackles and forced three fumbles. Was a two-year captain and helped team to a 41–5 record in four years, capturing three district titles.

== College career ==
Green is Rice's career sack leader with 25.0. He finished Owls’ career with 209 tackles (138 solo), eight forced fumbles, two fumble recoveries, two interceptions, and four passes defensed in 44 games. Earned First-team All-WAC as senior, starting every game and registered 71 tackles, 13 for losses, and eight sacks and also forced five fumbles and returned an interception 13-yards for a touchdown. As junior, earned First-team All-WAC honors, while starting every game. Won Joe Lipscomb Award as school's top true freshman player. Played in all 11 games.

== Professional career ==
=== Jacksonville Jaguars ===
He was selected by the Jacksonville Jaguars in the sixth round of the 2003 NFL draft with the 176th overall pick. In 2003 Green missed his rookie season with Jaguars after suffering patella fracture in practice (9/17). Was inactive for first two weeks of season prior to injury. In 2004, he made NFL debut at Tennessee (9/26) tallying one solo tackle. Had one quarterback pressure versus Kansas City (10/24) re-aggravating patella injury and placed on injured reserve (10/26).

=== St. Louis Rams ===
In 2005, he was signed by the Rams and he made first career sack on Titans’ QB Steve McNair versus Tennessee (9/25), adding three tackles. Notched four tackles, one special teams tackle, and 1.0 sack versus Jacksonville (10/30). He ended the season with 32 tackles and 3 sacks and one forced fumble. In 2006, he played in 13 games making first start week 13 versus Arizonza. Green totaled 30 tackles with half of a sack, a pass defensed and one special teams tackle.

=== Seattle Seahawks ===
In 2007 Green was signed by the Seattle Seahawks as an unrestricted free agent.
