= Blake Schlueter =

American football player (born 1986)

No. 63
- Position: Center

Personal information
- Born: April 22, 1986 (age 40); Ganado, Texas, U.S.
- Listed height: 6 ft 2 in (1.88 m)
- Listed weight: 279 lb (127 kg)

Career information
- High school: Ganado
- College: Texas Christian
- NFL draft: 2009: 7th round, 225th overall pick

Career history
- Denver Broncos (2009)*; Seattle Seahawks (2009)*; Atlanta Falcons (2009–2010)*
- * Offseason or practice squad member only

Awards and highlights
- First-team All-MW (2008); Second-team All-MW (2007)
- Stats at Pro Football Reference

Blake Schlueter (born April 22, 1986) is an American former professional football player who was a center in the National Football League (NFL). He was selected by the Denver Broncos in the seventh round of the 2009 NFL draft. He played college football for the TCU Horned Frogs.

Schlueter was also a member of the Seattle Seahawks and Atlanta Falcons.

== Early life ==
Schlueter played high school football at Ganado High School in Ganado, Texas. He was named Ganado's Male Athlete of the Year in his senior year. He also earned all-state recognition for his playing of the center and defensive end positions. Schlueter was selected as a finalist for the 2A Player of the Year and was an all-state center and defensive end as a senior. He totaled 329 tackles, including 27 sacks and 13 blocked kicks during his prep career. He also earned first-team all-Greater Houston honors and was the district and area defensive MVP. He posted 124 tackles, including 20 tackles for loss, 11 sacks and four blocked punts as a senior as well. As a junior, Schlueter was chosen as a second-team all-state performer on defense and a third-team selection at center. As a sophomore, he was the district defensive Newcomer of the Year and was a first-team-all-area pick at center.

== College career ==
Schlueter played college football at Texas Christian University in Fort Worth, Texas. He was selected as a second-team All-Mountain West Conference after the 2007 season and first-team after the 2008 season. He also made the watch list for the Rimington Trophy in the 2007 season.

== Professional career ==
=== Denver Broncos ===
Schlueter was selected in the seventh round (225th overall) by the Denver Broncos in the 2009 NFL draft. On June 12, 2009, Schlueter signed a multi-year contract with the Broncos. He was waived on September 1.

=== Seattle Seahawks ===
The Seattle Seahawks signed Schlueter to their practice squad on September 7 and released him on September 15.

=== Atlanta Falcons ===
Schlueter was signed to the Atlanta Falcons' practice squad on November 24. After his contract expired following the season, he was re-signed to a future contract on January 4, 2010. He was released on September 4, 2010.
