= Industrial Independent School District =

School district in Texas, United States

Location
- Vanderbilt, TX ESC Region 3 United States

District information
- Type: Public
- Grades: PK–12
- Superintendent: Clark Motley
- NCES District ID: 4824150

Students and staff
- Students: 1,170 (2023–2024)
- Teachers: 98.85 (on an FTE basis)
- Student–teacher ratio: 11.84:1
- Athletic conference: UIL Class AAA
- Colors: Maroon and Gray

Other information
- Mascot: Cobra
- Website: www.industrialisd.org

Industrial Independent School District is a public school district based in the community of Vanderbilt, Texas, United States.

The district currently serves an area of three hundred square miles in southern Jackson County and a portion of Victoria County. It encompasses the communities of Vanderbilt, Lolita, Francitas, La Salle, and La Ward. Most of the Inez census-designated place is in Industrial ISD.

In 2009, the school district was rated "academically acceptable" by the Texas Education Agency.

== History ==
In the summer of 1948, the Industrial Consolidated Independent School District was organized. It was formed through the merger of three districts - Vanderbilt, La Ward, and Lolita. Two more districts, Francitas and Inez, joined the district in December 1948. In September 1949, the new district held its first classes. In March 1961, the district dropped the word 'Consolidated' from its name and became known as the Industrial Independent School District.

== Schools ==
- Industrial High School (Grades 9-12)
- Industrial Junior High School (Grades 6-8)
- Industrial Elementary School East (Grades PK-5)
- Industrial Elementary School West (Grades PK-5)
