= Vanderbilt, Texas =

- Census-designated place
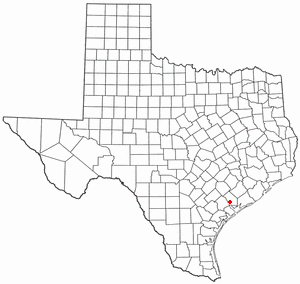
- Location of Vanderbilt, Texas

- Coordinates: 28°49′20″N 96°36′57″W
- Country: United States of America
- State: Texas
- County: Jackson

Area
  - Total: 1.9 sq mi (4.9 km^{2})
  - Land: 1.9 sq mi (4.9 km^{2})
  - Water: 0 sq mi (0.0 km^{2})
- Elevation: 39 ft (12 m)

Population (2020)
  - Total: 409
  - Density: 220/sq mi (83/km^{2})
- Time zone: UTC-6 (Central (CST))
  - Summer (DST): UTC-5 (CDT)
- ZIP code: 77991
- Area code: 361
- FIPS code: 48-74984
- GNIS feature ID: 1370583

Vanderbilt is an unincorporated community and census-designated place (CDP) in Jackson County, Texas, United States. The population was 409 at the 2020 census.

== History ==
Vanderbilt was established in 1904, built around the St. Louis, Brownsville and Mexico Railway station of the old Mitchell spread in the George Ewing league. The community has served as a trade center for local farmers and traders. At one time there was a hotel in the community. A post office was built in 1907 and was in use through 1988, when a new one was built. The ZIP Code is 77991. By 1945, Vanderbilt had a population of 300 and about 10 stores and trading posts. The town's population reached 900 in 1962, the highest in its history. By 1971, the town was back down to 667, where it remained stable until 1990. Then, there were only five stores remaining in town, and the population decreased by the hundreds.

== Geography ==
Vanderbilt is located in southwestern Jackson County at 28°49′20″N 96°36′57″W (28.822110, -96.615708). It is 13 miles (21 km) by road south of Edna, the county seat.

According to the United States Census Bureau, the Vanderbilt CDP has a total area of 1.9 square miles (4.9 km^{2}), all land.

== Demographics ==
Historical population
Census	Pop.	Note	%±
2000	411		—
2010	395		−3.9%
2020	409		3.5%
U.S. Decennial Census; 1850–1900 1910; 1920 1930 1940; 1950 1960 1970; 1980 1990 2000; 2010 2020

Vanderbilt first appeared as a census designated place in the 2000 U.S. census.

=== 2020 census ===
Vanderbilt CDP, Texas – Racial and ethnic composition Note: the US Census treats Hispanic/Latino as an ethnic category. This table excludes Latinos from the racial categories and assigns them to a separate category. Hispanics/Latinos may be of any race.
Race / Ethnicity (NH = Non-Hispanic)	Pop 2000	Pop 2010	Pop 2020	% 2000	% 2010	% 2020
White alone (NH)	236	206	194	57.42%	52.15%	47.43%
Black or African American alone (NH)	40	25	12	9.73%	6.33%	2.93%
Native American or Alaska Native alone (NH)	1	1	1	0.24%	0.25%	0.24%
Asian alone (NH)	0	0	5	0.00%	0.00%	1.22%
Native Hawaiian or Pacific Islander alone (NH)	0	0	0	0.00%	0.00%	0.00%
Other race alone (NH)	0	0	1	0.00%	0.00%	0.24%
Mixed race or Multiracial (NH)	2	3	24	0.49%	0.76%	5.87%
Hispanic or Latino (any race)	132	160	172	32.12%	40.51%	42.05%
Total	411	395	409	100.00%	100.00%	100.00%

=== 2000 census ===
As of the census of 2000, there were 411 people, 146 households, and 111 families residing in the CDP. The population density was 217.2 inhabitants per square mile (83.9/km^{2}). There were 163 housing units at an average density of 86.1 per square mile (33.2/km^{2}). The racial makeup of the CDP was 65.94% White, 10.46% African American, 0.24% Native American, 20.19% from other races, and 3.16% from two or more races. Hispanic or Latino of any race were 32.12% of the population.

There were 146 households, out of which 41.1% had children under the age of 18 living with them, 56.8% were married couples living together, 11.6% had a female householder with no husband present, and 23.3% were non-families. 22.6% of all households were made up of individuals, and 10.3% had someone living alone who was 65 years of age or older. The average household size was 2.82 and the average family size was 3.32.

In the CDP, the population was spread out, with 30.4% under the age of 18, 10.9% from 18 to 24, 25.8% from 25 to 44, 23.1% from 45 to 64, and 9.7% who were 65 years of age or older. The median age was 35 years. For every 100 females, there were 98.6 males. For every 100 females age 18 and over, there were 107.2 males.

== Education ==
Vanderbilt is served by the Industrial Independent School District and is home to the Industrial High School Cobras.

The closest colleges to Vanderbilt are Victoria College [Victoria, TX] (27 mi; 2,511 students), Wharton County Junior College [Wharton, TX] (50 mi; 3,124 students), and Coastal Bend College [Beeville, TX] (83 mi; 2,150 students). The closest major university is Texas A&M University–Victoria [Victoria, TX] (30 mi; 4,491 students).
