= Francitas, Texas =

Unincorporated community in Texas, US

Francitas is an unincorporated community in Jackson County, Texas, United States. According to the Handbook of Texas, the community had an estimated population of 760 in 2000.

== Geography ==
Francitas is located at 28°51′35″N 96°20′19″W (28.8597082, -96.3385798). It is situated along FM 616 in southeastern Jackson County, approximately 28 miles south of El Campo and 30 miles east of Victoria.

== History ==
A small colony of French families settled in the area during the late 1890s and soon thereafter, railroad employees named the community Francitas. The Valley Fruit Farm and Garden Company promoted the community by publicly selling lots in 1909. A year later, acreage purchased from local rancher Lafayette Ward was surveyed into additional lots for settlement. The Francitas post office was established in 1911, with C.O. Hardy serving as its first postmaster. It became a stop on the St. Louis, Brownsville and Mexico Railway in 1914. The population peaked at around 300 in 1940, with a total of three businesses operating in the community. During the latter half of the twentieth century, Francitas experienced fluctuations in its population. From approximately 100 in the 1950s, Francitas was home to 200 residents in the early 1960s. That number had declined to 30 by 1990 before increasing to 143 in 2000.

Francitas has a post office, with the ZIP code 77961.

== Education ==
Public education in the community of Francitas is provided by the Industrial Independent School District.
