= Oakland Normal School =

Normal school in Texas, United States

Coordinates: 29.6013°N 96.8308°W

Oakland Normal School was a normal school in Oakland, Colorado County, Texas for training African American teachers. The school opened in 1882 and operated for over three decades. G. R. Townsend and then Robert Lloyd Smith served as the school's principals.

Robert Lloyd Smith taught at the school before becoming principal. He was active in seeking to improve the lives of the community's African Americans and formed an improvement society for farmers. The section where they lived was known as Freedmantown.

Smith travelled from Oakland to Hampton Institute to speak and discussions included establishing an agricultural college in Texas following the Tuskegee teaching model.

A historical marker was erected for the school in 1990.
