= Edna High School =

Location
- 1307 W Gayle St. Edna, Texas 77957-1504; United States; 28.9644°N 96.65218°W

Information
- School type: Public high school
- Motto: Hold the Rope!
- Established: 1913
- School district: Edna Independent School District
- Principal: Scott Kana
- Staff: 39.19 (FTE)
- Grades: 9-12
- Enrollment: 432 (2023-2024)
- Student to teacher ratio: 11.02
- Colors: Royal Blue & White
- Athletics conference: UIL Class AAA
- Mascot: Cowboy
- Website: Edna High School

Edna High School is a public high school located in the city of Edna, Texas, United States and classified as a 3A school by the University Interscholastic League (UIL). It is a part of the Edna Independent School District located in northwest Jackson County. In 2015, the school was rated "Met Standard" by the Texas Education Agency. The school's logo is plagiarized from the Bucking Horse and Rider, which is a registered trademark of the state of Wyoming.

== Athletics ==
The Edna Cowboys compete in these sports -

Cross Country, Volleyball, Football, Basketball, Powerlifting, Golf, Tennis, Track, Baseball & Softball

=== State titles ===
- Girls Basketball -
  - 1965(2A)
- Boys Track -
  - 2012(2A),

=== State finalists ===
- Football -
  - 1965(2A)
- Girls Basketball -
  - 1990(3A)

== Notable alumni ==
- Stone Cold Steve Austin (1983) - American actor and retired professional wrestler
