= Lavaca-Navidad River Authority =

- Abbreviation: LNRA
- Formation: 1941
- Type: Government-owned corporation
- Purpose: Water conservation and reclamation
- Headquarters: 4631 Farm to Market Road 3131, near Edna, Texas, 77957
- Coordinates: 28.89830°N 96.58690°W
- Region served: Jackson County, Texas
- General Manager: Patrick Brzozowski
- Main organ: Board of Directors
- Website: http://www.lnra.org/

The Lavaca-Navidad River Authority or LNRA was formed in August, 1941 by the Texas legislature. Its regulatory authority is authorized by Article 16, Section 59, of the Texas Constitution, codified in Vernon's Annotated Texas Civil Statutes as Article 8280-131. Its main concerns are water conservation in the Lavaca River and Navidad River basins within the boundaries of Jackson County, Texas. The authority maintains its headquarters at 4631 Farm to Market Road 3131 in unincorporated Jackson County, near the City of Edna.

== Reservoir ==
The LNRA currently operates the Palmetto Bend Dam on the Navidad River which forms Lake Texana.

== See also ==
- List of Texas river authorities
