= Jackson County Monument =

- U.S. National Register of Historic Places
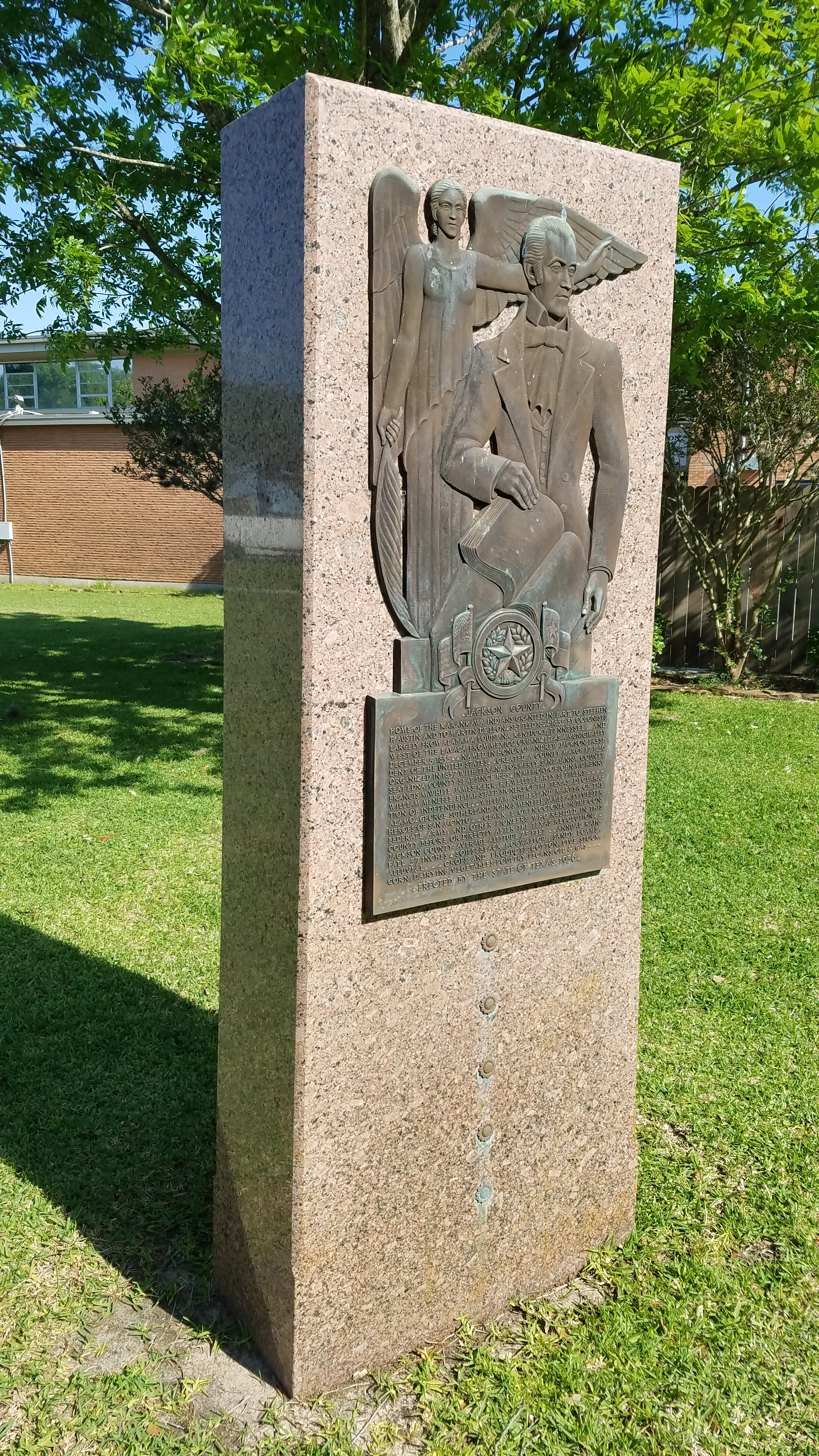
- Photo on April 19, 2018

- Location within Texas Location within the United States
- Location: 115 W Main St., Edna, Texas
- Coordinates: 28°58′40″N 96°38′49″W
- Built: 1936
- MPS: Monuments and Buildings of the Texas Centennial MPS
- NRHP reference No.: 100002350
- Added to NRHP: April 19, 2018

The Jackson County Monument, in Edna, Texas, was listed on the National Register of Historic Places in 2018.

It is located on the grounds of the Jackson County Courthouse.

It was designed by architects Page & Southerland and sculptor Raoul Josset.
