= Oakland, Colorado County, Texas =

Oakland, Texas
- Unincorporated community
- Location within the state of Texas Oakland (the United States)
- Coordinates: 29°36′06″N 96°49′48″W
- Country: United States
- State: Texas
- County: Colorado
- Elevation: 167 ft (51 m)
- Time zone: UTC-6 (Central (CST))
  - Summer (DST): UTC-5 (CDT)
- ZIP code: 78951
- Area code: 979
- GNIS feature ID: 1343015

Oakland is an unincorporated community in Colorado County, Texas, United States. According to the Handbook of Texas, the community had an estimated population of 80 in 2000.

== History ==
It is located in a space that James Bowie originally owned. The settlement, which was then known as Prairie Point, had a store on the stage route that connected Columbus and Gonzales as early as 1844. A. C. Herford built out the town in 1857. Amasa Turner consented to relocate his post office in Lavaca County to Herford's location when the town was unable to obtain a post office due to its proximity to other post offices. However, Turner stipulated that the post office would continue to use the name Oakland, which he had selected to honor David G. Burnet's residence. In 1861, a Masonic lodge was founded in the town. 200 people were living in the town in 1884, along with three general stores, a bar, a steam cotton gin, two churches, and saw and grist mills. Oakland had 264 residents in 1900, then had 200 residents, seven businesses, and a church in the 1930s. By 1950, there were only three companies and only 100 people living there. 95 people lived there in 1970, and 80 in 1974. Oakland had several houses and three churches in 1981. From 1974 to 2000, the population was estimated to be 80.

Although it is unincorporated, Oakland has a post office with the ZIP code 78951.

The Strunk-Woolsey House in the community was listed on the National Register of Historic Places.

== Geography ==
Oakland is located southwest of the intersection of Farm to Market Roads 532 and 2144, 22 mi (35 km) southwest of Columbus, 8 mi (13 km) southwest of Weimar, and 16 mi (26 km) southeast of La Grange in northwestern Colorado County, near the Lavaca County line. The Navidad River also flows through Oakland.

It is also notably located between San Antonio and Houston.

== Education ==
By the 1850s, there was a little log schoolhouse in the village. In the 1870s, a two-story schoolhouse was constructed, with Masonic meetings taking place on the second floor. The structure served as a church as well. Oakland Normal School was established in 1882 to train Black educators. It continued to operate in 1884. There were two schools in the community in 1904: one for 81 Black students and one for 65 White students. Today, public education in the community is provided by the Weimar Independent School District.

== Notable person ==
- John Woolsey, who served on the 20th Texas Legislature.

== See also ==
- U.S. Route 90 in Texas
- Farm to Market Road 2434
