= Olivia, Texas =

- Unincorporated community
- Location within Texas Location within the United States
- Coordinates: 28°38′19″N 96°27′20″W
- Country: United States
- State: Texas
- County: Calhoun
- Elevation: 10 ft (3.0 m)
- Time zone: UTC-6 (Central (CST))
  - Summer (DST): UTC-5 (CDT)
- Area code: 361
- GNIS feature ID: 1364529

Olivia is an unincorporated community in Calhoun County, Texas, United States. According to the Handbook of Texas, the community had a population of 215 in 2000. It is part of the Victoria, Texas Metropolitan Statistical Area.

== Geography ==
Olivia is located near the intersection of Texas State Highways 172 and 159, 2 mi (3.2 km) from Port Alto, 14 mi (23 km) east of Port Lavaca, 12 mi (19 km) east of Point Comfort, and 28 mi (45 km) southeast of Edna in eastern Calhoun County. It is also on Lavaca Bay.
