= Robert Lloyd Smith =

American politician (1861–1942)

Texas State Representative from District 43 (Colorado County)
- In office January 8, 1895 – January 10, 1899
- Preceded by: Daniel Washington Jackson
- Succeeded by: Charles Alexander Allen

Deputy United States Marshal for the Eastern District of Texas
- In office 1902–1909
- Appointed by: Theodore Roosevelt

Personal details
- Born: January 8, 1861 Charleston, South Carolina, U.S.
- Died: July 10, 1942 (aged 81) Waco, Texas, U.S.
- Resting place: Waco, Texas, U.S.
- Party: Republican
- Spouse: Ruby Cobb
- Education: Avery Institute, University of South Carolina, Atlanta University

Robert Lloyd Smith (January 8, 1861 – July 10, 1942) was an educator, businessman, and Republican politician who served two terms in the Texas Legislature. Born a free black in Charleston, South Carolina in 1861, he moved to Texas about 1880. He served as principal of the Oakland Normal School in Colorado County in 1885. In 1890 he founded the Farmer's Home Improvement Society, a farmer's cooperative association whose purpose was to help poor blacks lift themselves out of poverty. He was first elected to the legislature in 1895 and served until 1899. He was the last African-American to serve in the Texas State Legislature until Barbara Jordan's election in the 1960s. He was a delegate to the Republican National Convention in 1896. In 1902, he was appointed by President Theodore Roosevelt as Deputy U.S. Marshal for the Eastern District of Texas. He was an associate of Booker T. Washington and also served as a trustee of the Jeanes Foundation. He was married to Ruby Cobb and had two adopted children. He is depicted at the lower left on the Black Legislators Monument erected in 2010 at the Texas State Cemetery.

== See also ==
- African American officeholders from the end of the Civil War until before 1900
