= Ganado High School (Texas) =

Coordinates: 29.0376°N 96.5154°W

Ganado Secondary School

Location
- 411 W Devers; Ganado, Texas 77962-1200; United States

Information
- School type: Public high school
- School district: Ganado Independent School District
- Principal: Bryan Martin
- Staff: 20.93 (FTE)
- Grades: 6-12
- Enrollment: 216 (2023-2024)
- Student to teacher ratio: 10.32
- Colors: Maroon & White
- Athletics conference: UIL Class 2A D1
- Mascot: Indian
- Yearbook: The Chieftain
- Website: ghs.ganadoisd.org

Ganado High School is a public high school located in Ganado, Texas (USA) and classified as a 2A school by the UIL. It is part of the Ganado Independent School District located in east central Jackson County. In 2015, the school was rated "Met Standard" by the Texas Education Agency.

== Athletics ==
The Ganado Indians compete in these sports

Cross Country, Volleyball, Football, Basketball, Powerlifting, Golf, Track, Softball & Baseball

=== State Titles ===
- Boys Track
  - 1980(1A)
- Football
  - 2024(2A/D1)
- Girls Golf
  - 1979(1A), 1981(2A), 1982(2A)
- Softball
  - 2025(2A/D1), 2026(2A/D1)
