= Industrial High School (Vanderbilt, Texas) =

Location
- 187 5th St. Vanderbilt, Texas 77991; United States; 28.8196°N 96.6158°W

Information
- School type: Public high school
- Established: 1949
- School district: Industrial Independent School District
- Principal: Heather Nairn
- Staff: 33.88 (on an FTE basis)
- Grades: 9-12
- Enrollment: 343 (2023-24)
- Student to teacher ratio: 10.12
- Colors: Maroon & gray
- Athletics conference: UIL Class AAA
- Mascot: Cobra
- Yearbook: The Derrick
- Website: www.industrialisd.org/en-US/industrial-high-school-8875c0dc

Industrial High School is a public high school located in Vanderbilt, Texas, United States and classified as a 3A school by the UIL. It is part of the Industrial Independent School District located in south central Jackson County. In 2015, the school was rated "Met Standard" by the Texas Education Agency.

== Athletics ==
The Industrial Cobras compete in these sports -

Cross country, volleyball, football, basketball, powerlifting, golf, tennis, track, softball and baseball

- Baseball
- Basketball
- Cross country
- Golf
- Football
- Powerlifting
- Softball
- Tennis
- Track and field
- Volleyball

=== State titles ===
- Boys Golf -
  - 1984(2A)
- Volleyball- 2019(3A)

== Notable alumni ==
- Laura Creavalle - (born January 25, 1959) Guyanese-born Canadian/American professional bodybuilder
- Chris Doelle - (born November 13, 1964) author of several books on Texas high school football, podcasting pioneer, marketer, founder of Lone Star Gridiron
- Brandon Green - (born September 5, 1980) professional football player for the Jacksonville Jaguars, St. Louis Rams & Seattle Seahawks of the NFL
