= Port Alto, Texas =

- Unincorporated community
- Location within Texas Location within the United States
- Coordinates: 28°39′36″N 96°24′48″W
- Country: United States
- State: Texas
- County: Calhoun
- Elevation: 10 ft (3.0 m)
- Time zone: UTC-6 (Central (CST))
  - Summer (DST): UTC-5 (CDT)
- Area code: 361
- GNIS feature ID: 1365594

Port Alto is an unincorporated community in Calhoun County, Texas, United States. According to the Handbook of Texas, the community had a population of 45 in 2000. It is part of the Victoria, Texas Metropolitan Statistical Area.

== Geography ==
Port Alto is located at the intersection of Texas State Highway Spur 159 and Farm to Market Road 307 on the western shore of Carancahua Bay, 4 mi (6.4 km) east of Olivia, 22 mi (35 km) southwest of Palacios, and 21 mi (34 km) northwest of Port Lavaca in northeastern Calhoun County.

== Education ==
Port Alto is served by the Calhoun County Independent School District.
