= Ganado Independent School District =

School district in Texas, United States

Address
- 210 South Sixth Street Ganado, TX, 77962; United States

District information
- Grades: PK–12
- Schools: 3
- NCES District ID: 4820310

Students and staff
- Students: 696 (2023–2024)
- Teachers: 55.09 (on an FTE basis)
- Student–teacher ratio: 12.63:1

Other information
- Website: www.ganadoisd.org

Ganado Independent School District is a public school district based in Ganado, Texas (USA). Ganado ISD was established in 1899.

In 2009, the school district was rated "academically acceptable" by the Texas Education Agency.

== Campuses ==
- Ganado High School (9-12)
- Ganado Jr High School (6-8)
- Ganado Elementary School (PK-5)

== Athletics ==
- Men's Sports: Football, Cross Country, Powerlifting, Baseball, Golf, Basketball, Track
- Women's Sports: Cross Country, Golf, Volleyball, Track, Softball, Cheerleading, Powerlifting

== Mascot ==
The main mascot for the schools is the Indians, while the women sports teams are represented as the Maidens.
