= Lake Texana =

Lake in Texas, USA

- Location within Texas Location within the United States
- Location: Jackson County, east of Edna, Texas
- Coordinates: 28.9103105°N 96.5539010°W
- Type: Water supply reservoir
- Primary inflows: Navidad River
- Primary outflows: Navidad River
- Basin countries: United States
- Surface area: 9,727 acres (3,936 ha)
- Max. depth: 58 ft (18 m)
- Water volume: 170,000 acre⋅ft (0.21 km^{3})
- Surface elevation: 44 ft (13 m)

Lake Texana is a reservoir on the Navidad River, 8 miles (13 km) east of Edna, in Jackson County, Texas. The reservoir is formed by the construction of Palmetto Bend Dam. The dam and lake are managed by the Lavaca-Navidad River Authority, and supply water to surrounding communities and industries. Lake Texana is the only reservoir managed by the Authority.

== Fish and plant populations ==
Lake Texana has been stocked with fish intended to encourage recreational fishing. Fish present in Lake Texana include catfish, largemouth bass, white crappie, white bass, hybrid striped bass, and sunfish. A variety of native plant species thrive in the lake, including, coontail, spikerush, cattail, pondweed, bull's tongue, pickerel weed, and duckweed. Three exotic, invasive species exist in the lake: water hyacinth, hydrilla and giant salvinia. The giant salvinia is limited to the Sandy Creek arm of the reservoir. There are also American alligators.

== History ==
Palmetto Bend Dam was begun in 1968 and completed in 1980 by the United States Bureau of Reclamation at a cost of approximately $92 million. The resulting reservoir covered the ghost town of Texana, which had been founded in 1832 near the junction of the Navidad and Lavaca rivers.

A bill to convey to Texas ownership of the dam and reservoir project was introduced by Congressman Ron Paul on August 2, 1999. After paying the "adjusted net present value of current repayment obligations" (an amount approximated to be $45 million in September 2000), Texas assumed responsibility for all aspects of operation, maintenance, and replacement of the dam and reservoir, a responsibility transferred to the Lavaca-Navidad River Authority.
