= Edna Independent School District =

School district in Texas, United States

Address
- 601 North Wells Edna, Texas, 77957; United States

District information
- Grades: PK–12
- Schools: 5
- NCES District ID: 4818210

Students and staff
- Students: 1,576 (2023–2024)
- Teachers: 123.90 (on an FTE basis)
- Student–teacher ratio: 12.72:1

Other information
- Website: www.ednaisd.org

Edna Independent School District is a public school district based in Edna, Texas (USA).

In 2009, the school district was rated "academically acceptable" by the Texas Education Agency.

== Schools ==
- Edna High School (grades 9-12)
- Meadie Pumphrey Junior High (grades 6-8)
- Edna Elementary School (grades PK-5)
