= Hochheim, Texas =

- Unincorporated community
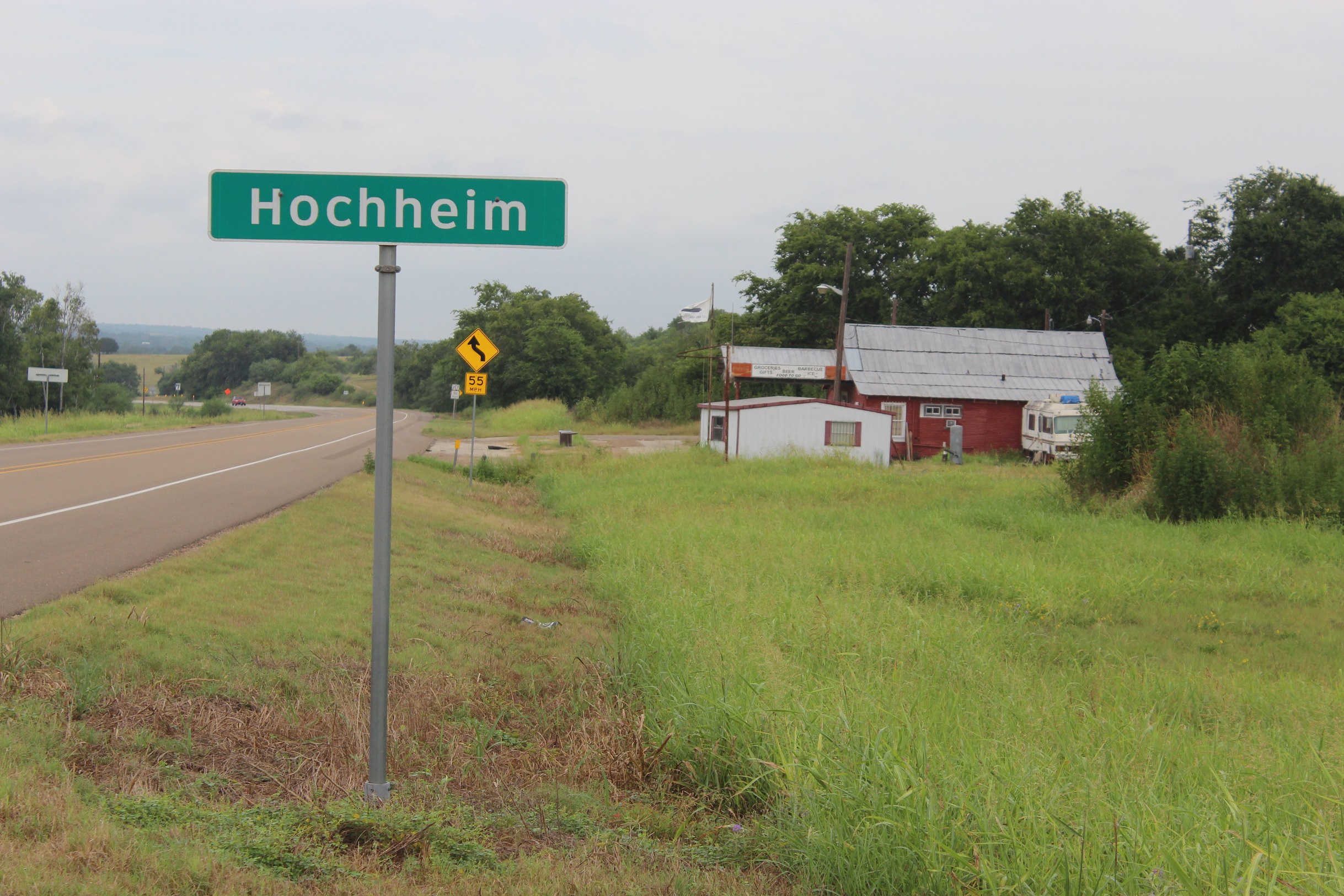
- Entering Hochheim

- Location within the state of Texas Hochheim (the United States)
- Coordinates: 29°18′45″N 97°17′30″W
- Country: United States
- State: Texas
- County: DeWitt
- Elevation: 354 ft (108 m)
- Time zone: UTC-6 (Central (CST))
  - Summer (DST): UTC-5 (CDT)

Hochheim (/ˈhoʊhaɪm/ HOH-hyme) is an unincorporated community in DeWitt County, Texas, United States. It was founded as a settlement for German immigrants along the Guadalupe River.

== Geography ==
Hochheim is located at 29°18′45″N 97°17′30″W, 354 feet (108 m) above sea level. It is located on the Texas Coastal Plain.

== History ==
The Guadalupe River passes through the town, and the present-day site is believed to be the location that Spanish explorers including Alonso de Leon, used to cross the river. Álvar Núñez Cabeza de Vaca is regarded as the first European to encounter the river at this location circa 1528. He named it, "The River of Nuts" due to the large concentration of pecan trees that grow naturally along the river's banks.

In 1848, Valentine Hoch, a German immigrant from the disputed Alsace-Lorraine region, traveled to the rolling hills near the lower Guadalupe River with his son, after arriving in America at the port of Indianola, Texas. Upon arrival to the hills, Hoch remarked: "Here we shall build our home." Construction of the home soon began from the stones at the Guadalupe River bed, and was completed several years thereafter. Others with surnames that included Crawford, Helms, Humphrey, Steen, Morrisse, Times, and Schwab, began to build homes and establish businesses in the area; soon the community of Hochheim was established. The name could be translated to mean "Hoch's home" for the earliest settler, or "High home" for the fact that Hoch constructed his home on a hill. Townspeople also referred to the settlement as "Dutchtown".

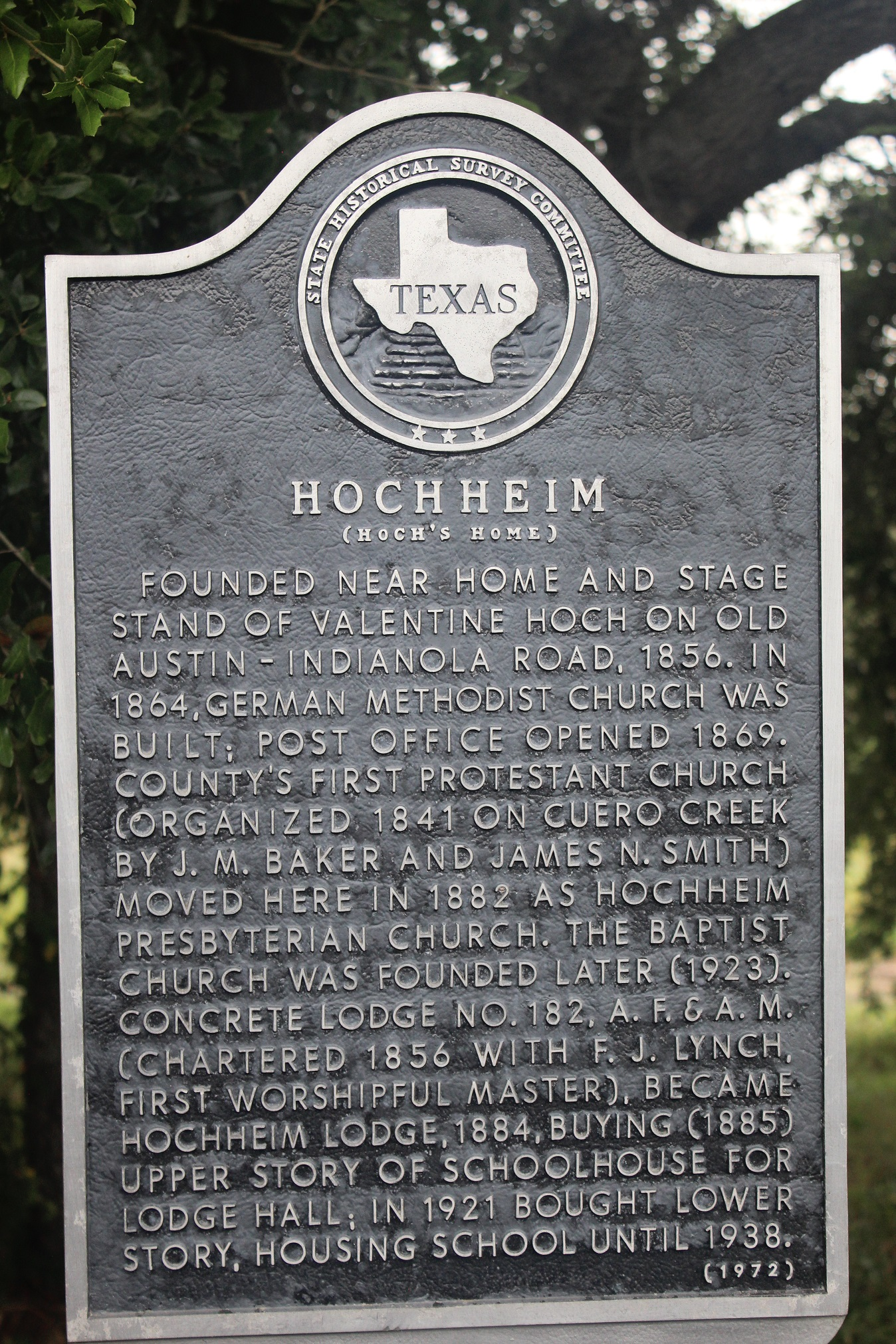
Historical marker

After the Schwab family opened a general store and gin, Hochheim became a trade stop between Indianola and Austin. A railroad was constructed through the town connecting the two cities. By 1870, the town had two grocery stores, a drugstore and a blacksmith shop. That year, a post office was established in the town. Sometime between 1870 and 1880, a Masonic Lodge was built at the turn of the century that served as a school, church and community center. The German Methodist Church was present in the town as early as 1864, and a Presbyterian church moved to the city in 1882, remaining in the town until 1961. By 1885, 200 people lived in Hochheim with ten businesses operating in the area. The population reached its peak of 261 in 1904, and dwindled to around 100 between the 1920s and 1950s.

Valentine Hoch's home was restored to its original state in 1953 after being damaged during a 1934 storm. It has been recognized with a Texas Medallion by the Texas Historical Society. By the 1980s, Hochheim's population had fallen to 70 and only one business remained.
