= Ganado, Texas =

- City
- City of Ganado
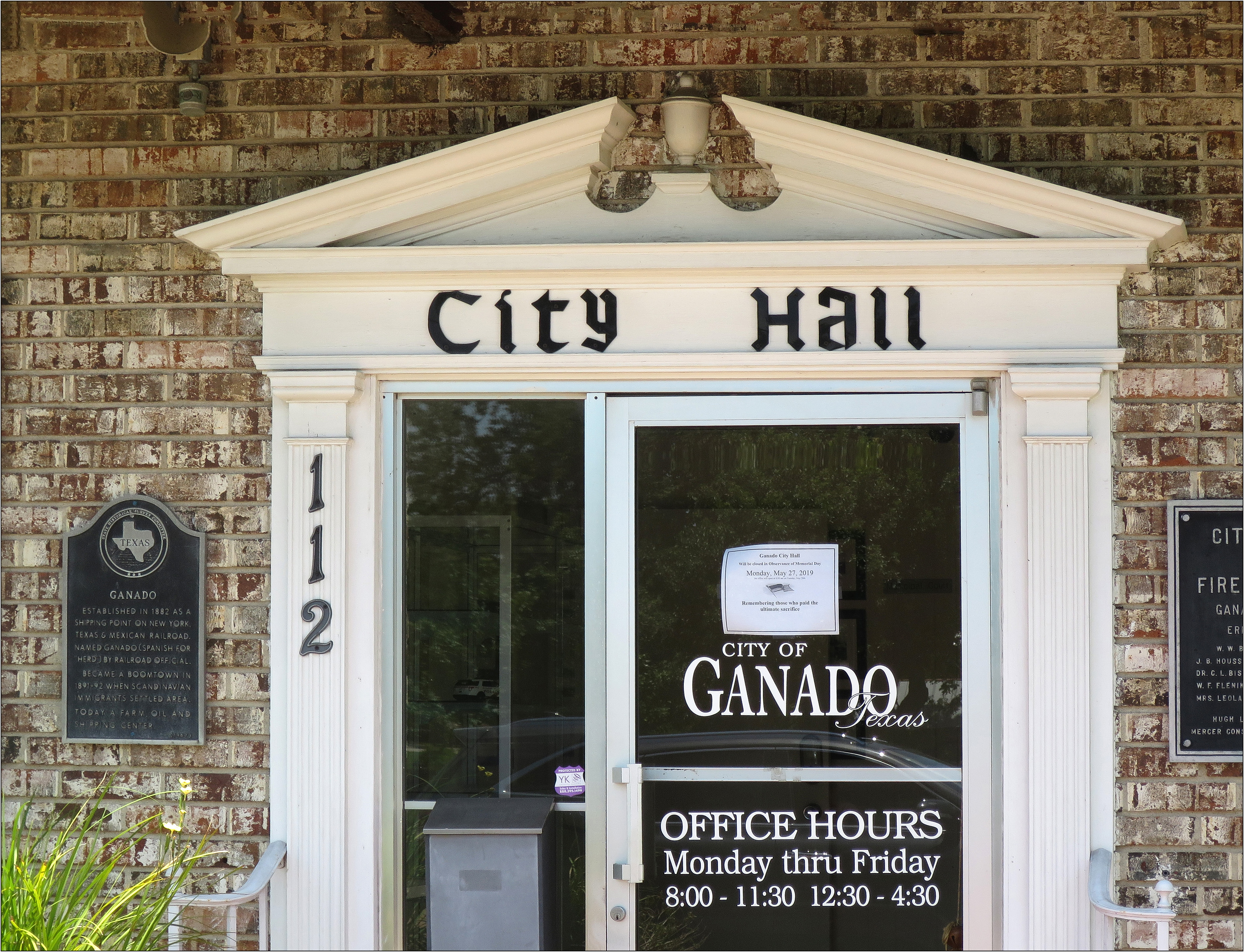

- Seal

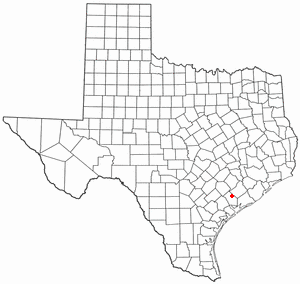
- Location of Ganado, Texas

- Coordinates: 29°2′28″N 96°30′44″W
- Country: United States of America
- State: Texas
- County: Jackson
- Incorporated: 1909

Government
  - Type: General Law
  - Mayor: Clinton Tegeler

Area
  - Total: 1.17 sq mi (3.03 km^{2})
  - Land: 1.17 sq mi (3.02 km^{2})
  - Water: 0.0039 sq mi (0.01 km^{2})
- Elevation: 66 ft (20 m)

Population (2020)
  - Total: 1,975
  - Density: 1,764.2/sq mi (681.18/km^{2})
- Time zone: UTC-6 (Central (CST))
  - Summer (DST): UTC-5 (CDT)
- ZIP code: 77962
- Area code: 361
- FIPS code: 48-28080
- GNIS feature ID: 1357846
- Website: City of Ganado

Ganado (/ɡəˈneɪdoʊ/ gə-NAY-doh) is a city in Jackson County, Texas, United States. The population was 1,975 at the 2020 census.

== Geography ==
Ganado is located at 29°2′28″N 96°30′44″W (29.041111, –96.512136), approximately 35 miles northeast of Victoria.

According to the United States Census Bureau, the city has a total area of 1.2 square miles (3.1 km^{2}), all land.

== Demographics ==
Historical population
Census	Pop.	Note	%±
1910	558		—
1920	716		28.3%
1930	626		−12.6%
1940	717		14.5%
1950	1,258		75.5%
1960	1,626		29.3%
1970	1,640		0.9%
1980	1,770		7.9%
1990	1,701		−3.9%
2000	1,915		12.6%
2010	2,003		4.6%
2020	1,975		−1.4%
U.S. Decennial Census

=== 2020 census ===
As of the 2020 census, Ganado had a population of 1,975, 677 households, and 459 families residing in the city.

The median age was 36.7 years in Ganado; 25.5% of residents were under the age of 18 and 15.9% were 65 years of age or older. For every 100 females there were 97.5 males, and for every 100 females age 18 and over there were 99.2 males age 18 and over.

0.0% of residents lived in urban areas, while 100.0% lived in rural areas.

There were 677 households in Ganado, of which 41.5% had children under the age of 18 living in them. Of all households, 50.7% were married-couple households, 20.2% were households with a male householder and no spouse or partner present, and 24.5% were households with a female householder and no spouse or partner present. About 24.1% of all households were made up of individuals and 10.9% had someone living alone who was 65 years of age or older.

There were 781 housing units, of which 13.3% were vacant. The homeowner vacancy rate was 1.5% and the rental vacancy rate was 20.3%.

Racial composition as of the 2020 census
Race	Number	Percent
White	1,011	51.2%
Black or African American	47	2.4%
American Indian and Alaska Native	25	1.3%
Asian	6	0.3%
Native Hawaiian and Other Pacific Islander	0	0.0%
Some other race	453	22.9%
Two or more races	433	21.9%
Hispanic or Latino (of any race)	1,090	55.2%

=== 2000 census ===
As of the census of 2000, there were 1,915 people, 656 households, and 478 families residing in the city. The population density was 1,645.3 inhabitants per square mile (635.3/km^{2}). There were 767 housing units at an average density of 659.0 per square mile (254.4/km^{2}). The racial makeup of the city was 72.48% White, 4.86% African American, 0.42% Native American, 0.21% Asian, 17.91% from other races, and 4.13% from two or more races. Hispanic or Latino of any race were 39.06% of the population.

There were 656 households, out of which 37.8% had children under the age of 18 living with them, 56.3% were married couples living together, 12.0% had a female householder with no husband present, and 27.0% were non-families. 23.5% of all households were made up of individuals, and 12.2% had someone living alone who was 65 years of age or older. The average household size was 2.85 and the average family size was 3.35.

In the city, the population was spread out, with 29.5% under the age of 18, 11.2% from 18 to 24, 25.8% from 25 to 44, 18.1% from 45 to 64, and 15.4% who were 65 years of age or older. The median age was 34 years. For every 100 females, there were 101.8 males. For every 100 females age 18 and over, there were 96.7 males.

The median income for a household in the city was $34,038, and the median income for a family was $39,514. Males had a median income of $31,058 versus $16,667 for females. The per capita income for the city was $14,758. About 11.7% of families and 14.8% of the population were below the poverty line, including 18.3% of those under age 18 and 18.2% of those age 65 or over.

== History ==
The City of Ganado was a ranching community when it was first settled. Most settlers lived near Mustang Creek and traveled to Texana, Victoria and Indianola for supplies. Jackson County's "second city," Ganado was originally known as Mustang Settlement, after nearby Mustang Creek. Cattle ranching was the primary economic engine and herds were driven to Louisiana for sale and later to Kansas City. That came to an abrupt end with the coming of the railroad in 1882. As the story goes, a railroad official looked out the window of a train car and saw a large herd of cattle. He decided the area should be called Ganado, which means "cattle" in Spanish. Thus Ganado was named in 1882.

Scandinavian immigrants bought land and began farming in 1891. A second wave of immigration brought Germans and Bohemians in the 1880s and 1890s. Jim McFarland moved his general store from its earlier location on McFarland Creek to a site in town. After McFarland died, Thomas Babcock-who was also the town's first postmaster, bought the remaining stock and continued a store in the building. Babcock's establishment, later known as the Old Texas House, provided supplies to local ranchers. Soon afterwards, Babcock also established the first residence and first cotton gin in Ganado. In 1891 T. N. Mauritz opened the first bank in Ganado. By 1909 the town had sixty businesses. When the railroad was built through, Ganado grew almost overnight into a bustling city. New homes, hotels, and businesses sprang up quickly. The city incorporated in 1909.

By 1914 the town was thriving with a rice mill and storage facilities, 750 citizens, a school district and a weekly newspaper. By 1937, Main Street was paved, concrete sidewalks were added and water lines were installed. By 1950 the population had increased to 1,253.

The Little School of the 400 was created in 1957 to meet the educational needs of Spanish-speaking children in Texas who were being discriminated against for their lack of knowledge of the English language. The goal of the program was to teach 400 basic English words to help Spanish-speaking children to manage instruction given in English in the regular public educational system. Under the leadership of Felix Tijerina, LULAC Council 60, of Houston, Texas, chose Ganado to be its first community to pilot the program. The program went on to become very successful and the state of Texas adopted it as their own. It later became a precursor to the national Head Start Program.

In 1963, a municipal bond was overwhelmingly approved for $60,000. This bond would be separated into two parts: $44,000 for a new city hall and $16,000 for new fire truck and equipment. The Council at that time were Mayor W.W. Brandes, Councilmen Dr. C.L. Bishop and J.B. Housson. The open house for new building was on May 3, 1964. In 1988 forty-three businesses served 1,770 citizens. In 1990 the population was 1,701, increasing to 1,915 in the 2000 Census. As of the 2010 Census, the population is 2,003. Many descendants of the early pioneer families still live in the city today .

== Highways ==
- U.S. Highway 59 (Future Interstate 69)
- State Highway 172
- Loop 522
- Farm to Market Road 710
- Farm to Market Road 1157

== Education ==
Ganado is served by Ganado Independent School District and is home to the Ganado High School Indians.

The designated community college for Ganado ISD is Wharton County Junior College.

== Notable people ==
- Patrick Flores, Archbishop of San Antonio from 1979 until 2004
- William Neff Patman, Former U.S. Representative (Texas's 14th congressional district 1981–1985) from Texarkana who made Ganado his home after he lost his bid for re-election in 1984 for a seat in the House of Representatives. He also served as the city's attorney from 1955 until 1960
- Blake Schlueter, center drafted in the seventh round of 2009 NFL draft by the Denver Broncos; played for two seasons with the Broncos, the Seattle Seahawks and the Atlanta Falcons). Schlueter graduated from Ganado High School in 2005

== Trivia ==
- Ganado is the second largest town in Jackson County, after Edna.
- Ganado is also known for a theater that was part of a now defunct chain of theaters in Texas called Long Theaters. The theater opened in 1939 that not only showed movies, but that had stage acts as well. The theater still operates to this day.
- The first classes for the group Little School of the 400 took place in Ganado in 1957.
