= Midfield, Texas =

Unincorporated community in Texas, US

Coordinates: 28°56′25″N 96°12′47″W

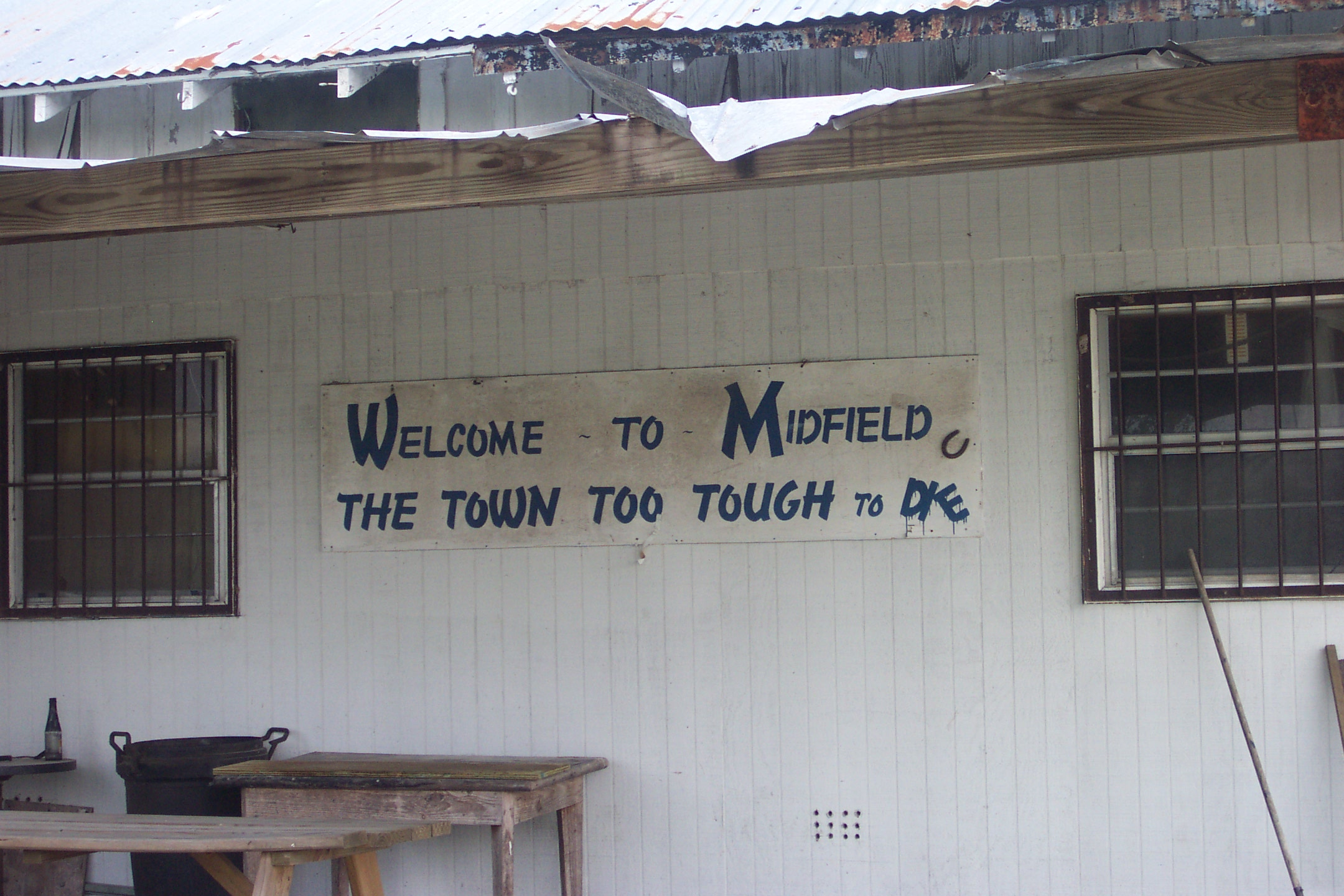
A sign in the community of Midfield

Midfield is an unincorporated community and census-designated place in Matagorda County, Texas, United States. Midfield has a post office, with the ZIP code 77458. The population as of 2022 is 408 residents.

It is also part of the Tidehaven Independent School District. The designated community college for Tidehaven ISD is Wharton County Junior College.

== Demographics ==
Historical population
Census	Pop.	Note	%±
2020	356		—
U.S. Decennial Census; 1850–1900 1910; 1920 1930 1940; 1950 1960 1970; 1980 1990 2000; 2010 2020

Midfield first appeared as a census designated place in the 2020 U.S. census.

=== 2020 census ===
Midfield CDP, Texas – Racial and ethnic composition Note: the US Census treats Hispanic/Latino as an ethnic category. This table excludes Latinos from the racial categories and assigns them to a separate category. Hispanics/Latinos may be of any race.
Race / Ethnicity (NH = Non-Hispanic)	Pop 2020	% 2020
White alone (NH)	132	37.08%
Black or African American alone (NH)	2	0.56%
Native American or Alaska Native alone (NH)	0	0.00%
Asian alone (NH)	2	0.56%
Native Hawaiian or Pacific Islander alone (NH)	0	0.00%
Other race alone (NH)	0	0.00%
Mixed race or Multiracial (NH)	1	0.28%
Hispanic or Latino (any race)	219	61.52%
Total	356	100.00%
