= Lolita, Texas =

- CDP
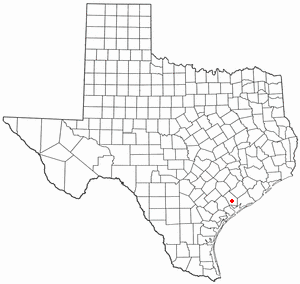
- Location of Lolita, Texas

- Coordinates: 28°50′15″N 96°32′35″W
- Country: United States of America
- State: Texas
- County: Jackson

Area
  - Total: 2.6 sq mi (6.7 km^{2})
  - Land: 2.6 sq mi (6.7 km^{2})
  - Water: 0 sq mi (0.0 km^{2})
- Elevation: 39 ft (12 m)

Population (2020)
  - Total: 519
  - Density: 200/sq mi (77/km^{2})
- Time zone: UTC-6 (Central (CST))
  - Summer (DST): UTC-5 (CDT)
- ZIP code: 77971
- Area code: 361
- FIPS code: 48-43432
- GNIS feature ID: 1361622

Lolita is a census-designated place (CDP) in Jackson County, Texas, United States. The population was 519 at the 2020 census.

== History ==
The area around Lolita was first settled in the 1840s by Isaac N. Mitchell, who ran a plantation there. Lolita was established in 1909 and named for Lolita Reese, the granddaughter of a veteran of the Texas Revolution. The following year, a post office opened in Lolita, and the St. Louis, Brownsville and Mexico Railway built a switch there. After World War II, five businesses operated in Lolita, and by 1969 the community had seven businesses.

== Geography ==
Lolita is located at 28°50′15″N 96°32′35″W (28.837530, -96.542929).

According to the United States Census Bureau, the CDP has a total area of 2.6 square miles (6.7 km^{2}), all land.

== Demographics ==
Historical population
Census	Pop.	Note	%±
2000	548		—
2010	555		1.3%
2020	519		−6.5%
U.S. Decennial Census; 1850–1900 1910; 1920 1930 1940; 1950 1960 1970; 1980 1990 2000; 2010 2020

Lolita first appeared as a census designated place in the 2000 U.S. census.

=== 2020 census ===
Lolita CDP, Texas – Racial and ethnic composition Note: the US Census treats Hispanic/Latino as an ethnic category. This table excludes Latinos from the racial categories and assigns them to a separate category. Hispanics/Latinos may be of any race.
Race / Ethnicity (NH = Non-Hispanic)	Pop 2000	Pop 2010	Pop 2020	% 2000	% 2010	% 2020
White alone (NH)	423	331	302	77.19%	59.64%	58.19%
Black or African American alone (NH)	1	3	4	0.18%	0.54%	0.77%
Native American or Alaska Native alone (NH)	1	0	2	0.18%	0.00%	0.39%
Asian alone (NH)	0	1	5	0.00%	0.18%	0.96%
Native Hawaiian or Pacific Islander alone (NH)	0	0	0	0.00%	0.00%	0.00%
Other race alone (NH)	0	0	0	0.00%	0.00%	0.00%
Mixed race or Multiracial (NH)	3	7	13	0.55%	1.26%	2.50%
Hispanic or Latino (any race)	120	213	193	21.90%	38.38%	37.19%
Total	548	555	519	100.00%	100.00%	100.00%

=== 2000 census ===
As of the census of 2000, there were 548 people, 201 households, and 142 families residing in the CDP. The population density was 210.9 inhabitants per square mile (81.4/km^{2}). There were 234 housing units at an average density of 90.0 per square mile (34.7/km^{2}). The racial makeup of the CDP was 85.22% White, 0.18% African American, 0.18% Native American, 0.18% Asian, 0.36% Pacific Islander, 12.04% from other races, and 1.82% from two or more races. Hispanic or Latino of any race were 21.90% of the population.

There were 201 households, out of which 34.8% had children under the age of 18 living with them, 59.7% were married couples living together, 8.5% had a female householder with no husband present, and 28.9% were non-families. 24.4% of all households were made up of individuals, and 11.9% had someone living alone who was 65 years of age or older. The average household size was 2.73 and the average family size was 3.27.

In the CDP, the population was spread out, with 30.5% under the age of 18, 7.7% from 18 to 24, 26.6% from 25 to 44, 21.9% from 45 to 64, and 13.3% who were 65 years of age or older. The median age was 34 years. For every 100 females, there were 99.3 males. For every 100 females age 18 and over, there were 87.7 males.

The median income for a household in the CDP was $42,065, and the median income for a family was $50,536. Males had a median income of $36,607 versus $26,000 for females. The per capita income for the CDP was $16,148. About 3.4% of families and 4.2% of the population were below the poverty line, including 8.4% of those under age 18 and none of those age 65 or over.

== Education ==
Public education in the community of Lolita is provided by the Industrial Independent School District.

== Popular culture ==
In the Vladimir Nabokov novel Ada, or Ardor, in a letter to Marina after his duel with Baron D'Onsky, Demon Veen tells her that he had gone to his aunt's ranch near Lolita, Texas. The notes on the text, written by Vivian Darkbloom (Nabokov's alter ego), state that "this town exists, or, rather, existed, for it has been renamed, I believe, after the appearance of the notorious novel," referring, of course, to Nabokov's own novel Lolita.

== Climate ==
The climate in this area is characterized by hot, humid summers and generally mild to cool winters. According to the Köppen Climate Classification system, Lolita has a humid subtropical climate, abbreviated "Cfa" on climate maps.
