= Lavaca River =

River in Texas, United States

Coordinates: 28.6972°N 96.5761°W

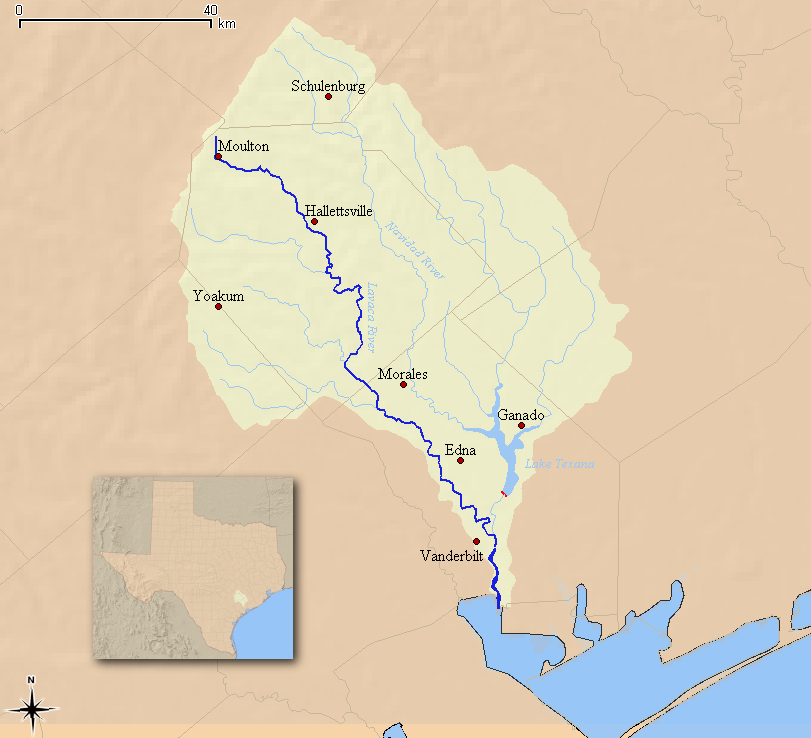
Map of the Lavaca River and associated watershed

The Lavaca River is a navigable river in Texas. It begins in the northeastern part of Gonzales County, and travels generally southeast for 115 miles (185 km) until it empties into Lavaca Bay, a component of Matagorda Bay.

== History ==
The navigable Texas river's name is a corruption of Rivière des Vaches ("Cow River"), by French explorer René-Robert Cavelier, Sieur de La Salle. The flagship of Jean Laffite's fleet was alleged to have been scuttled in the lower part of the river.

== Economy ==
Hallettsville, and Moulton, Texas, are included in Lavaca-Navidad River Authority, which was established in 1941.

== See also ==
- List of rivers of Texas
- Port Lavaca, Texas
