= Jackson County, Texas =

County in Texas, United States

- County
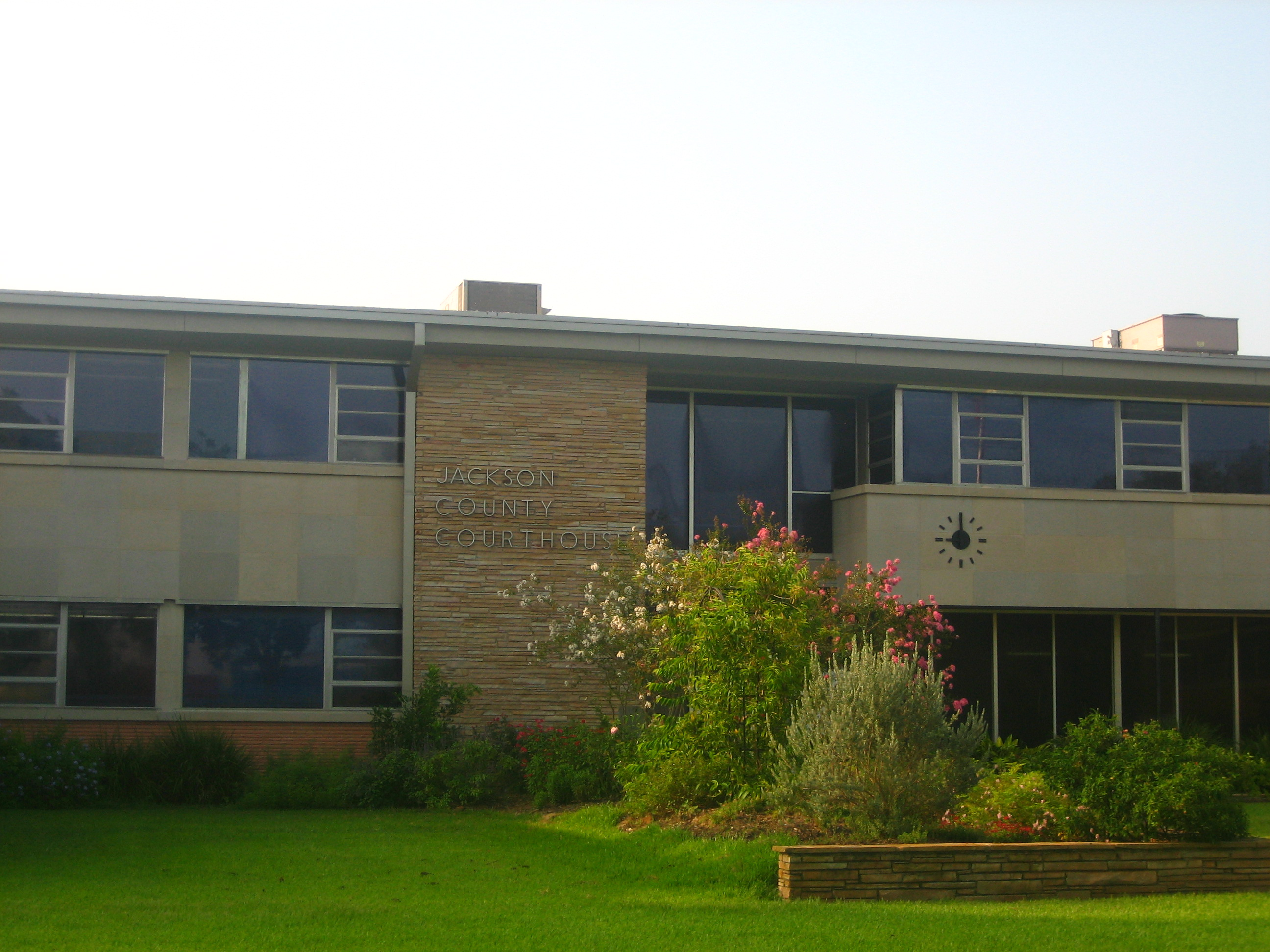
- The Jackson County Courthouse in Edna

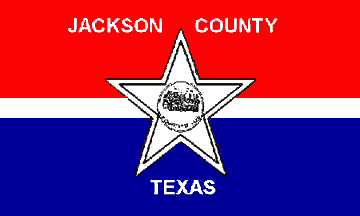
- Flag

- Location within the U.S. state of Texas
- Coordinates: 28°56′N 96°35′W
- Country: United States
- State: Texas
- Founded: 1836
- Named for: Andrew Jackson
- Seat: Edna
- Largest city: Edna

Area
  - Total: 857 sq mi (2,220 km^{2})
  - Land: 829 sq mi (2,150 km^{2})
  - Water: 27 sq mi (70 km^{2}) 3.2%

Population (2020)
  - Total: 14,988
  - Estimate (2025): 15,393 ▲
  - Density: 18.1/sq mi (6.98/km^{2})
- Time zone: UTC−6 (Central)
  - Summer (DST): UTC−5 (CDT)
- Congressional district: 27th
- Website: www.co.jackson.tx.us

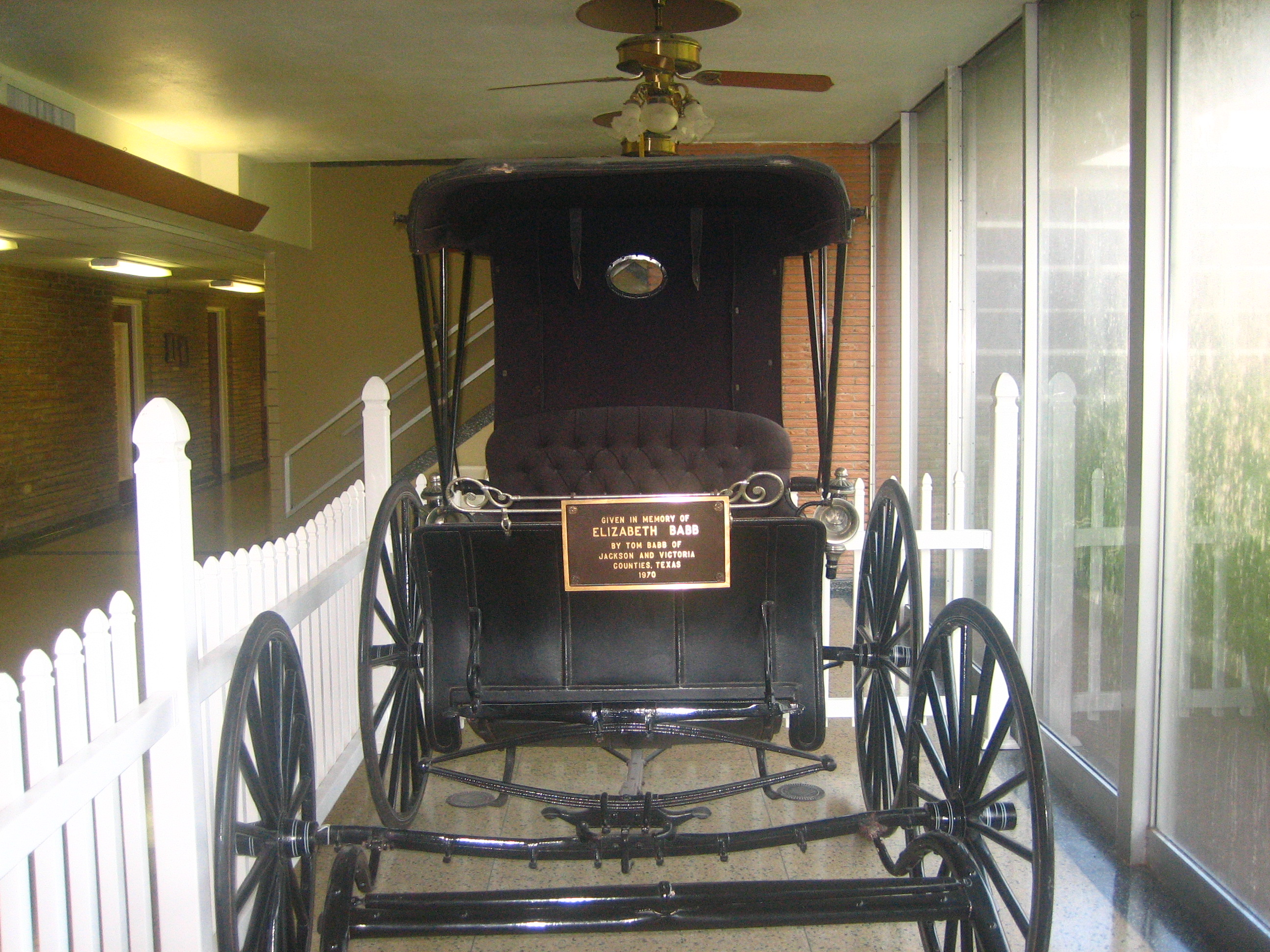
Historical carriage inside the Jackson County, Texas, Courthouse

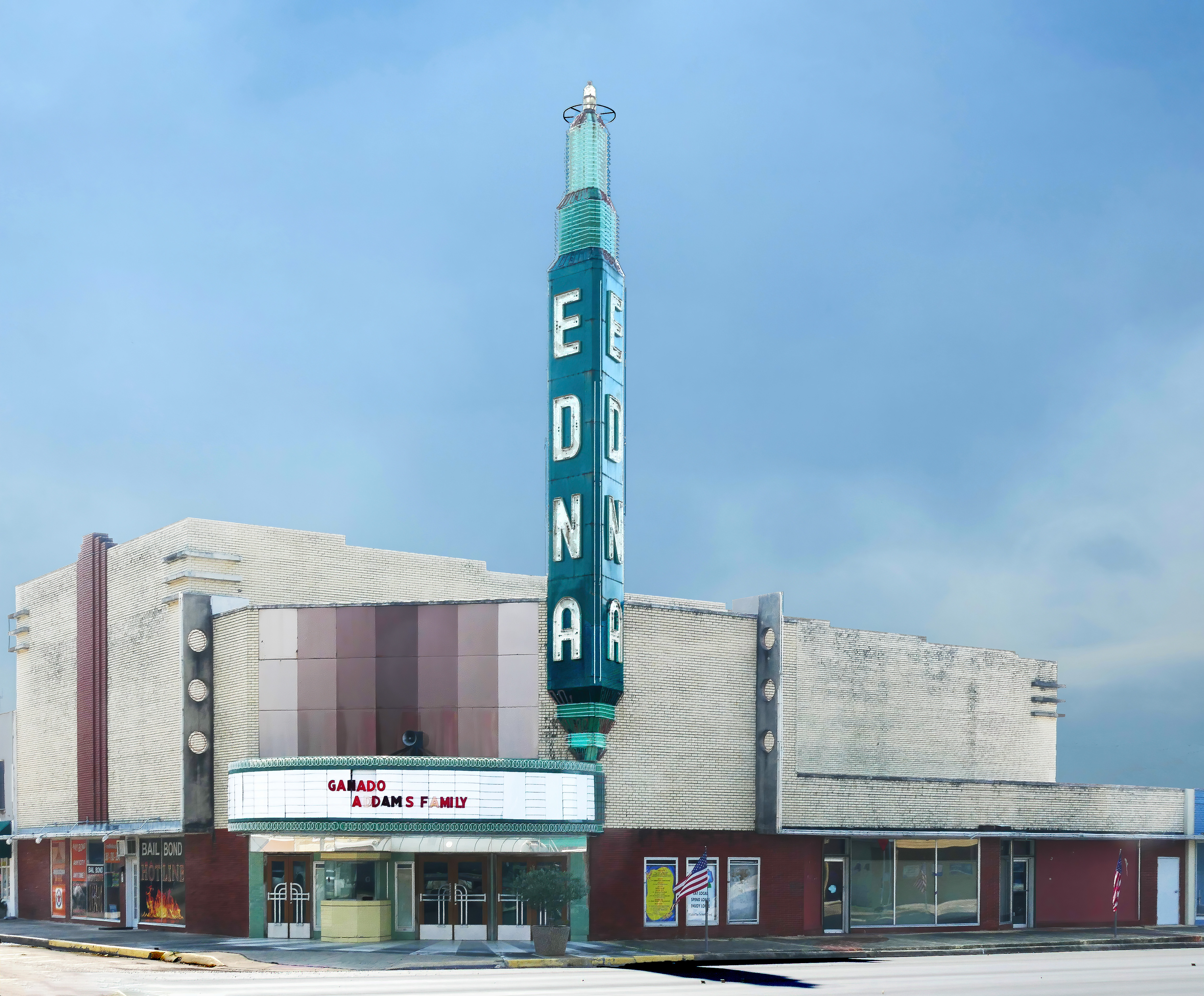
Edna Theatre -- Edna, TX

Jackson County is a county in the U.S. state of Texas. As of the 2020 census its population was 14,988. Its county seat is Edna. The county was created in 1835 as a municipality in Mexico and in 1836 was organized as a county (of the Republic of Texas). It is named for Andrew Jackson, President of the United States from 1829 to 1837.

== Geography ==
According to the U.S. Census Bureau, the county has a total area of 857 square miles (2,220 km^{2}), of which 829 square miles (2,150 km^{2}) is land and 27 square miles (70 km^{2}) (3.2%) is water.

=== Major highways ===
- U.S. Highway 59
  - Interstate 69 is currently under construction and will follow the current route of U.S. 59 in most places.
- State Highway 35
- State Highway 111
- State Highway 172
- Loop 521
- Loop 522
- Farm to Market Road 234
- Farm to Market Road 616
- Farm to Market Road 1862

=== Adjacent counties ===
- Colorado County (north)
- Wharton County (northeast)
- Matagorda County (southeast)
- Calhoun County (south)
- Victoria County (southwest)
- Lavaca County (northwest)

== Demographics ==
Historical population
Census	Pop.	Note	%±
1850	996		—
1860	2,612		162.2%
1870	2,278		−12.8%
1880	2,723		19.5%
1890	3,281		20.5%
1900	6,094		85.7%
1910	6,471		6.2%
1920	11,244		73.8%
1930	10,980		−2.3%
1940	11,720		6.7%
1950	12,916		10.2%
1960	14,040		8.7%
1970	12,975		−7.6%
1980	13,352		2.9%
1990	13,039		−2.3%
2000	14,391		10.4%
2010	14,075		−2.2%
2020	14,988		6.5%
2025 (est.)	15,393	▲	2.7%
U.S. Decennial Census; 1850–2010 2020

=== Racial and ethnic composition ===
Jackson County, Texas – Racial and ethnic composition Note: the US Census treats Hispanic/Latino as an ethnic category. This table excludes Latinos from the racial categories and assigns them to a separate category. Hispanics/Latinos may be of any race.
Race / Ethnicity (NH = Non-Hispanic)	Pop 1980	Pop 1990	Pop 2000	Pop 2010	Pop 2020	% 1980	% 1990	% 2000	% 2010	% 2020
White alone (NH)	9,462	9,047	9,546	8,855	8,510	70.87%	69.38%	66.33%	62.91%	56.78%
Black or African American alone (NH)	1,357	1,195	1,081	942	937	10.16%	9.16%	7.51%	6.69%	6.25%
Native American or Alaska Native alone (NH)	11	13	42	35	36	0.08%	0.10%	0.29%	0.25%	0.24%
Asian alone (NH)	6	11	55	50	158	0.04%	0.08%	0.38%	0.36%	1.05%
Native Hawaiian or Pacific Islander alone (NH)	x	x	6	1	5	x	x	0.04%	0.01%	0.03%
Other race alone (NH)	22	1	6	8	102	0.16%	0.01%	0.04%	0.06%	0.68%
Mixed race or Multiracial (NH)	x	x	104	105	411	x	x	0.72%	0.75%	2.74%
Hispanic or Latino (any race)	2,494	2,772	3,551	4,079	4,829	18.68%	21.26%	24.68%	28.98%	32.22%
Total	13,352	13,039	14,391	14,075	14,988	100.00%	100.00%	100.00%	100.00%	100.00%

=== 2020 census ===
As of the 2020 census, the county had a population of 14,988. The median age was 40.0 years. 24.3% of residents were under the age of 18 and 19.8% of residents were 65 years of age or older. For every 100 females there were 98.4 males, and for every 100 females age 18 and over there were 97.6 males age 18 and over.

The racial makeup of the county was 65.3% White, 6.7% Black or African American, 0.5% American Indian and Alaska Native, 1.1% Asian, <0.1% Native Hawaiian and Pacific Islander, 12.4% from some other race, and 14.0% from two or more races. Hispanic or Latino residents of any race comprised 32.2% of the population.

39.4% of residents lived in urban areas, while 60.6% lived in rural areas.

There were 5,558 households in the county, of which 33.3% had children under the age of 18 living in them. Of all households, 53.2% were married-couple households, 18.3% were households with a male householder and no spouse or partner present, and 23.8% were households with a female householder and no spouse or partner present. About 24.6% of all households were made up of individuals and 12.1% had someone living alone who was 65 years of age or older.

There were 6,996 housing units, of which 20.6% were vacant. Among occupied housing units, 72.0% were owner-occupied and 28.0% were renter-occupied. The homeowner vacancy rate was 2.7% and the rental vacancy rate was 18.2%.

=== 2000 census ===
As of the 2000 census, there were 14,391 people, 5,336 households, and 3,889 families residing in the county. The population density was 17 people per square mile (6.6 people/km^{2}). There were 6,545 housing units at an average density of 8 units per square mile (3.1/km^{2}). The racial makeup of the county was 76.49% White, 7.64% Black or African American, 0.39% Native American, 0.39% Asian, 0.06% Pacific Islander, 12.65% from other races, and 2.39% from two or more races. 24.68% of the population were Hispanic or Latino of any race. 17.9% were of German, 10.8% American, 9.3% Czech, 6.0% Irish and 5.6% English ancestry according to Census 2000. 81.6% spoke English and 17.4% Spanish as their first language.

There were 5,336 households, out of which 34.70% had children under the age of 18 living with them, 58.20% were married couples living together, 10.50% had a female householder with no husband present, and 27.10% were non-families. 24.20% of all households were made up of individuals, and 12.50% had someone living alone who was 65 years of age or older. The average household size was 2.65 and the average family size was 3.15.

In the county, the population was spread out, with 27.40% under the age of 18, 8.20% from 18 to 24, 26.10% from 25 to 44, 22.30% from 45 to 64, and 15.90% who were 65 years of age or older. The median age was 37 years. For every 100 females there were 96.70 males. For every 100 females age 18 and over, there were 93.40 males.

The median income for a household in the county was $35,254, and the median income for a family was $42,066. Males had a median income of $32,639 versus $19,661 for females. The per capita income for the county was $16,693. About 12.20% of families and 14.70% of the population were below the poverty line, including 19.10% of those under age 18 and 15.60% of those age 65 or over.

== Communities ==
=== Cities ===
- Edna (county seat)
- Ganado
- La Ward

=== Census-designated places ===
- Lolita
- Vanderbilt

=== Unincorporated communities ===
- Francitas
- La Salle

=== Ghost town ===
- Texana

== Politics ==
Jackson County has voted Republican in every presidential election since 1980, often by landslide margins.

United States presidential election results for Jackson County, Texas
Year	Republican		Democratic		Third party(ies)	
Year	No.	%	No.	%	No.	%
1912	35	6.59%	323	60.83%	173	32.58%
1916	123	20.71%	403	67.85%	68	11.45%
1920	355	33.65%	562	53.27%	138	13.08%
1924	354	30.28%	758	64.84%	57	4.88%
1928	572	54.68%	473	45.22%	1	0.10%
1932	182	14.99%	1,030	84.84%	2	0.16%
1936	171	15.16%	952	84.40%	5	0.44%
1940	296	16.41%	1,506	83.48%	2	0.11%
1944	344	14.98%	1,708	74.39%	244	10.63%
1948	488	24.75%	1,343	68.10%	141	7.15%
1952	2,113	57.14%	1,584	42.83%	1	0.03%
1956	2,259	58.64%	1,571	40.78%	22	0.57%
1960	1,670	42.04%	2,268	57.10%	34	0.86%
1964	1,168	29.55%	2,775	70.22%	9	0.23%
1968	1,438	33.55%	1,698	39.62%	1,150	26.83%
1972	2,743	69.81%	1,163	29.60%	23	0.59%
1976	1,884	42.50%	2,524	56.94%	25	0.56%
1980	2,540	56.91%	1,826	40.91%	97	2.17%
1984	3,661	66.83%	1,804	32.93%	13	0.24%
1988	2,954	57.75%	2,141	41.86%	20	0.39%
1992	2,451	47.57%	1,722	33.42%	979	19.00%
1996	2,533	54.59%	1,785	38.47%	322	6.94%
2000	3,365	69.30%	1,446	29.78%	45	0.93%
2004	3,766	74.18%	1,296	25.53%	15	0.30%
2008	3,723	73.46%	1,301	25.67%	44	0.87%
2012	3,906	77.73%	1,070	21.29%	49	0.98%
2016	4,266	80.46%	904	17.05%	132	2.49%
2020	5,231	82.34%	1,033	16.26%	89	1.40%
2024	5,386	85.10%	907	14.33%	36	0.57%

United States Senate election results for Jackson County, Texas1
Year	Republican		Democratic		Third party(ies)	
Year	No.	%	No.	%	No.	%
2024	5,222	82.89%	998	15.84%	80	1.27%

United States Senate election results for Jackson County, Texas2
Year	Republican		Democratic		Third party(ies)	
Year	No.	%	No.	%	No.	%
2020	5,167	81.90%	1,021	16.18%	121	1.92%

Texas Gubernatorial election results for Jackson County
Year	Republican		Democratic		Third party(ies)	
Year	No.	%	No.	%	No.	%
2022	4,013	87.30%	550	11.96%	34	0.74%

== Education ==
School districts include:

- Edna Independent School District
- Ganado Independent School District
- Hallettsville Independent School District
- Industrial Independent School District
- Palacios Independent School District

Residents of the county not in Ganado ISD are in the service area of Victoria College. Residents of the Ganado ISD part are in the service area of Wharton County Junior College.

== See also ==
- List of museums in the Texas Gulf Coast
- National Register of Historic Places listings in Jackson County, Texas
- Recorded Texas Historic Landmarks in Jackson County
