= Edna, Texas =

City in Jackson County, Texas, United States

- City
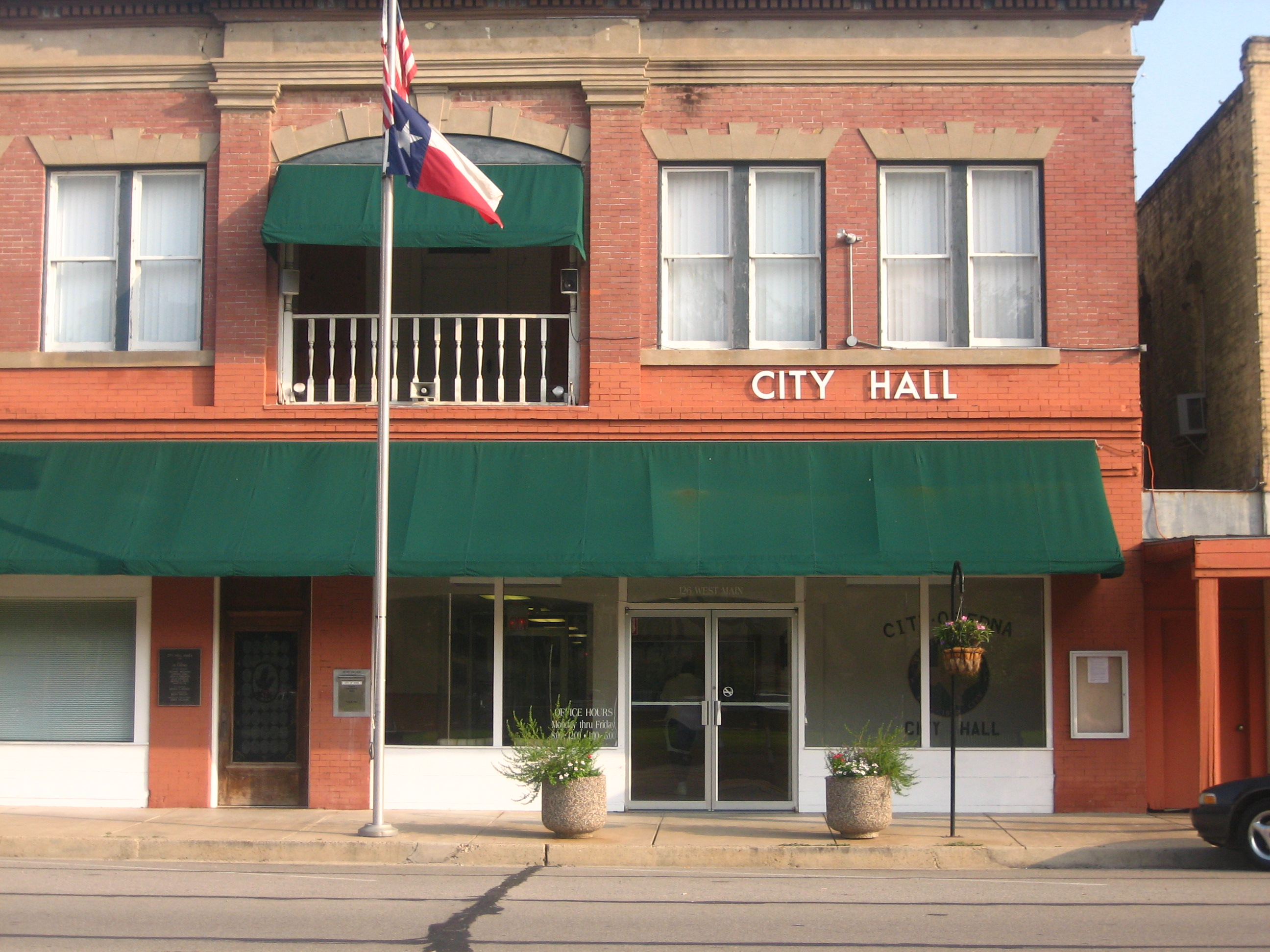
- Edna City Hall

- Location within Texas Location within the United States
- Coordinates: 28°58′43″N 96°38′46″W
- Country: United States
- State: Texas
- County: Jackson

Area
  - Total: 4.14 sq mi (10.71 km^{2})
  - Land: 4.14 sq mi (10.71 km^{2})
  - Water: 0 sq mi (0.00 km^{2})
- Elevation: 66 ft (20 m)

Population (2020)
  - Total: 5,987
  - Density: 1,448/sq mi (559.0/km^{2})
- Time zone: UTC-6 (Central (CST))
  - Summer (DST): UTC-5 (CDT)
- ZIP code: 77957
- Area code: 361
- FIPS code: 48-22720
- GNIS feature ID: 1356828
- Website: cityofedna.com

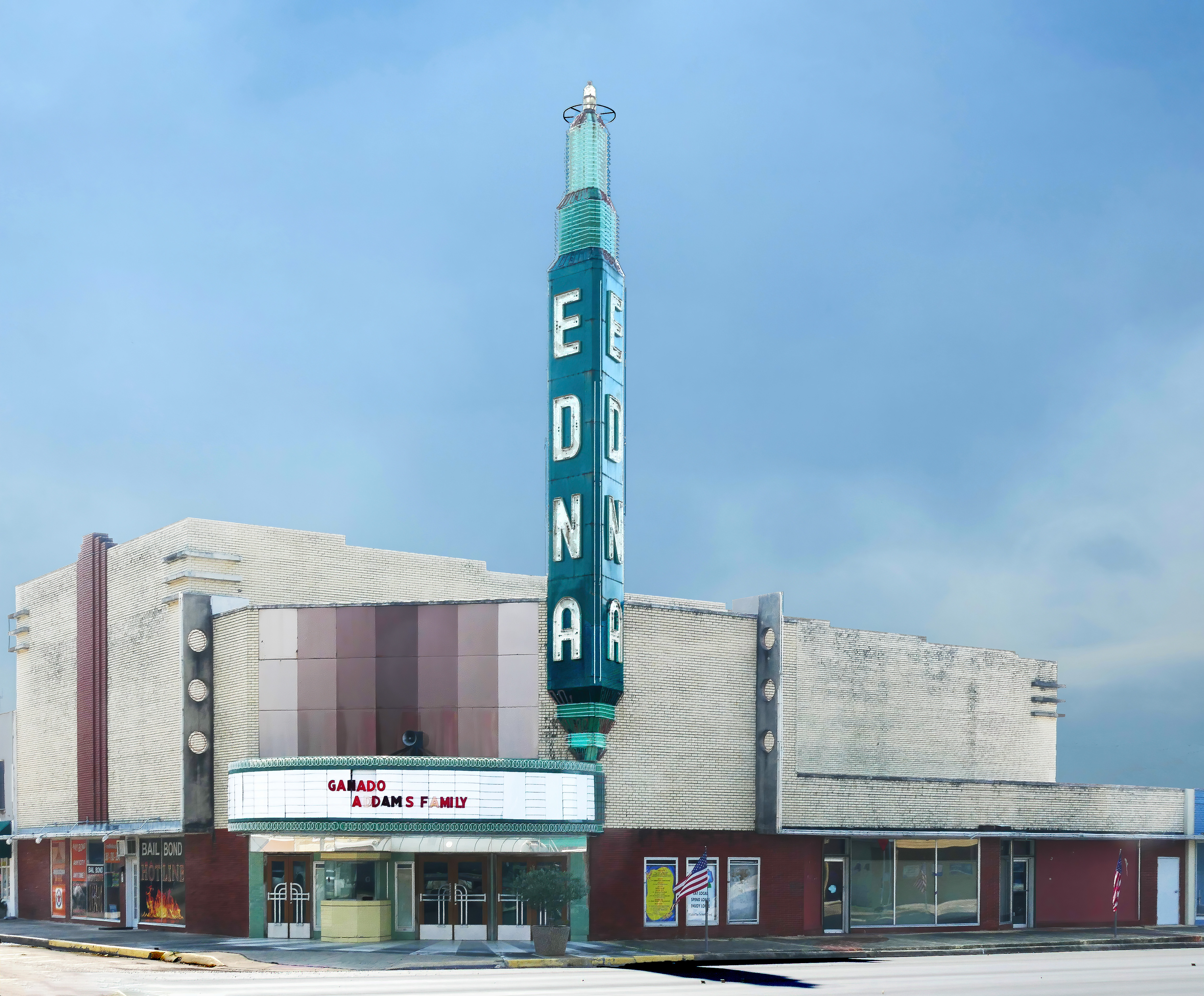
Edna Theater

Edna is a city and the county seat of Jackson County, Texas, United States. The population was 5,499 at the 2010 census and 5,987 at the 2020 census.

Edna is the gateway to 11,000-acre (45 km^{2}) Lake Texana, which covers the site of Texana, Texas. Edna has a hospital, convalescent home, library, museum, city park with swimming pool, three banks, two savings and loan associations, a country club with a nine-hole golf course, and Oak Creek Village, a retirement community. It is the center of a prosperous agricultural area with petroleum and natural gas production and has an active chamber of commerce, oilfield service industries, and two grain elevators.

== History ==
Edna, the county seat of Jackson County, was established in 1882 when the New York, Texas and Mexican Railway line was built from Rosenberg to Victoria and bypassed Texana, then the county seat. Construction of the railroad began in September 1881. Edna was laid out on land owned by Mrs. Lucy Flournoy, who conveyed right-of-way and a half interest in the townsite to the railroad, which was promoted and built by Italian Count Joseph Telfener. The NYT&M, nicknamed the "Macaroni", was constructed by Italian laborers, most of whom were brought from Lombardy by Telfener. After completion of the road, the majority of the crew remained in the area and established homes. The first train arrived on July 4, 1882; the first merchant was Gideon Egg, who moved his general merchandise store from Texana in 1882, and the first child born in the new community was Edna Louise Traylor, after whom the town was named.

In an election of January 22, 1883, residents voted to make Edna the county seat in place of Texana. The contract for a new courthouse was awarded on February 11, 1884. A post office opened in 1886. The first church congregations in Edna were the Methodist and Presbyterian, whose memberships moved from Texana almost intact. The latter brought their 1859 sanctuary with them 8 miles (13 km) overland. The building was also used by other denominations for worship services and is now the oldest public building remaining in the county. The Texana Presbyterian Church has been restored and serves in Edna as an area cultural center. It is listed on the National Register of Historic Places and is a Recorded Texas Historic Landmark.

The first newspaper in Edna was the Jackson County Progress. The newspaper plant, along with a large part of the business district, was destroyed in 1906 in the town's second disastrous fire. Succeeding the Progress was the Edna Herald, first published on November 22, 1906.

The 1954 Supreme Court case Hernandez v. Texas concerned the racial context of the jury selection for a trial that took place in Edna. The landmark decision of the case determined that Mexican Americans and all other racial groups in the United States had equal protection under the 14th Amendment of the U.S. Constitution.

== Geography ==
Edna is located west of the center of Jackson County, in the Gulf Coast region of Texas. The region is dominated by large live oak trees, heavily wooded areas, and lush farmland.

According to the United States Census Bureau, the city has a total area of 4.1 square miles (10.7 km^{2}), all land. The city is in the watershed of the Lavaca River, which flows southeast to the Gulf of Mexico at Lavaca Bay. Lake Texana, an impoundment on the Navidad River, a tributary of the Lavaca, is 6 miles (10 km) east of Edna.

U.S. Highway 59 (Future I-69) passes through the northwestern side of the city, leading northeast 100 miles (160 km) to Houston and southwest 25 miles (40 km) to Victoria. Corpus Christi is 119 miles (192 km) southwest of Edna via Future I-69 and Interstate 37.

=== Climate ===
The climate in this area is characterized by hot, humid summers and generally mild to cool winters. According to the Köppen Climate Classification system, Edna has a humid subtropical climate, abbreviated "Cfa" on climate maps.

== Demographics ==
Historical population
Census	Pop.	Note	%±
1890	537		—
1930	1,752		—
1940	2,724		55.5%
1950	3,855		41.5%
1960	5,038		30.7%
1970	5,332		5.8%
1980	5,634		5.7%
1990	5,343		−5.2%
2000	5,899		10.4%
2010	5,499		−6.8%
2020	5,987		8.9%
U.S. Decennial Census

=== 2020 census ===
As of the 2020 census, Edna had a population of 5,987, 2,168 households, and 1,372 families. The median age was 36.9 years, 26.7% of residents were under the age of 18, and 19.4% of residents were 65 years of age or older. For every 100 females there were 94.8 males, and for every 100 females age 18 and over there were 91.9 males age 18 and over.

97.8% of residents lived in urban areas, while 2.2% lived in rural areas.

There were 2,168 households in Edna, of which 37.2% had children under the age of 18 living in them. Of all households, 45.9% were married-couple households, 17.3% were households with a male householder and no spouse or partner present, and 30.9% were households with a female householder and no spouse or partner present. About 26.5% of all households were made up of individuals and 12.8% had someone living alone who was 65 years of age or older.

There were 2,637 housing units, of which 17.8% were vacant. The homeowner vacancy rate was 2.1% and the rental vacancy rate was 19.9%.

Racial composition as of the 2020 census
Race	Number	Percent
White	3,155	52.7%
Black or African American	866	14.5%
American Indian and Alaska Native	34	0.6%
Asian	105	1.8%
Native Hawaiian and Other Pacific Islander	2	0.0%
Some other race	924	15.4%
Two or more races	901	15.0%
Hispanic or Latino (of any race)	2,329	38.9%

=== 2000 census ===
As of the census of 2000, there were 5,899 people, 2,227 households, and 1,523 families residing in the city. The population density was 1,512.0 inhabitants per square mile (583.8/km^{2}). There were 2,609 housing units at an average density of 668.7 per square mile (258.2/km^{2}).

There were 2,227 households, out of which 35.0% had children under the age of 18 living with them, 48.9% were married couples living together, 15.0% had a female householder with no husband present, and 31.6% were non-families. 28.5% of all households were made up of individuals, and 14.9% had someone living alone who was 65 years of age or older. The average household size was 2.60 and the average family size was 3.20.

In the city, the population was spread out, with 29.2% under the age of 18, 8.5% from 18 to 24, 26.0% from 25 to 44, 20.9% from 45 to 64, and 15.4% who were 65 years of age or older. The median age was 35 years. For every 100 females, there were 91.4 males. For every 100 females age 18 and over, there were 87.1 males.

The median income for a household in the city was $29,000, and the median income for a family was $35,659. Males had a median income of $32,000 versus $19,079 for females. The per capita income for the city was $15,193. About 18.5% of families and 20.8% of the population were below the poverty line, including 27.7% of those under age 18 and 17.0% of those age 65 or over.

== Education ==
The city is served by the Edna Independent School District, with one elementary school, a middle school, and a high school. The mascot is the Cowboy.

== Notable people ==
- "Stone Cold" Steve Austin, professional wrestler and film star
- Candy Barr (Juanita Slusher, 1935–2005) burlesque dancer, stripper, and model
- Iben Browning, failed climatologist (1918–1991)
- Shifty Henry, session musician and songwriter (1921–1958)
- Curtis Cavielle Taylor (1896–1967) criminal attorney and civil rights lawyer; born in Edna

== Trivia ==
- Edna is known as "The Flag City of Texas", according to the city's website.
- The mascot back in the 1920s was the eagle.
- The First National Bank of Edna, later Allied Bank, was the first financial institution acquired by Houston-based Prosperity Bancshares.
