= Sweet Home, Lavaca County, Texas =

Sweet Home, Texas
- Unincorporated Community
- Interactive map of Sweet Home, Texas
- Coordinates: 29°20′43″N 97°04′18″W
- Settled: 1854

Population (2000)
  - Total: 360
- Time zone: UTC-6 (Central (CST))
  - Summer (DST): UTC-5 (CDT)
- ZIP Code: 77987
- GNIS feature ID: 1369462

Sweet Home is an unincorporated community in Lavaca County, Texas, United States. According to the Handbook of Texas, the community had an estimated population of 360 in 2000.

== Geography ==
Sweet Home is located at 29°20′43″N 97°04′18″W (29.3452449, -97.0716517). It is situated at the junction of Farm Roads 318 and 531 in Lavaca County, approximately one mile east of U.S. Highway 77A. Cities within a 15-mile (24 km) radius of Sweet Home include Hallettsville (to the northeast), Shiner (to the northwest), and Yoakum (to the southwest).

== History ==
In June 1853, Alabama native Solomon West purchased 2,214 acres (8.96 km^{2}) of land along Mustang Creek in Lavaca County. A year later, his family made the long journey to Texas. Upon their arrival, Solomon's daughter Mary exhaustingly exclaimed, "Pa, this would be a sweet home," and the name Sweet Home took root.

In 1860, George West established a store, hotel, and stables at the site. During the Civil War, Sweet Home served as a winter camp for freight and cotton wagon trains carrying supplies from Alleyton (in Colorado County) to Brownsville – the only Confederate port that remained open throughout most of the war. Czechs and Germans began arriving in the community during the 1870s. The San Antonio and Aransas Pass Railroad laid tracks from Hallettsville to Yoakum in 1887, approximately five miles south of Sweet Home. Most of the residents and businesses relocated to a new location along the rail line. A few Czechs opted to stay at the original site.

In 1890, the community had six stores. The first public school in Sweet Home was established in 1891. It was housed in the local Masonic Lodge hall.

A two-story frame school house was constructed on the corner of Hallettsville and West streets in 1919. It was replaced by a newer facility in the 1930s. The railroad that had served Sweet Home for years and contributed to its growth, closed its agency in 1937. The population was estimated at 350 in 1948. There were also twelve stores and a recreational hall in the community at this time. On September 20, 1967, a tornado spawned by Hurricane Beulah destroyed Sweet Home's post office and damaged homes, businesses, and the Queen of Peace church.

By the mid-1980s, around 360 people lived in the community. That figure remained steady through 2000. Sweet Home presently has two churches, a volunteer fire department, several businesses, and a new school.

Although Sweet Home is unincorporated, it has a post office, with the ZIP code of 77987.

== Education ==
Public education in the community of Sweet Home is provided by the Sweet Home Independent School District. The district has one campus, Sweet Home Elementary, which serves students in grades pre-kindergarten through eight. Students in grades nine through twelve are eligible attend either Yoakum High School (Yoakum ISD) or Hallettsville High School (Hallettsville ISD), with most opting for Yoakum.
