= Wied, Texas =

- Unincorporated area
- Location in Texas Location in the United States
- Coordinates: 29°26′20″N 97°03′22″W
- Country: United States
- State: Texas
- County: Lavaca
- Elevation: 299 ft (91 m)
- Time zone: UTC-6 (Central (CST))
  - Summer (DST): UTC-5 (CDT)
- ZIP code: 77984
- Area code: Area code 361
- GNIS feature ID: 1379272

Wied is an unincorporated area in west central Lavaca County in the U.S. state of Texas. It is located near U.S. Route 90 Alternate (US 90A) west of the county seat at Hallettsville. The first Anglo-American settlers arrived here in the 1830s, but by the late 1800s they were replaced by Germans and Czechs. The population declined after the 1940s. In 2018 the Vysehrad Independent School District operated an area school and a community center existed on US 90A.

== Geography ==
Wied Hall is located on US 90A approximately midway between Hallettsville and Shiner. The Geographic Names Information System (GNIS) places Wied at the intersection of FM 1891 and County Road 372, which is 0.8 miles (1.3 km) north of US 90A. The Vysehrad Elementary School is located east of Wied on County Road 182 to the north of US 90A.

== History ==
The first Anglo-Americans to arrive in the area were John Smeathers (the son of Old Three Hundred settler William Smeathers) in 1832 and Francis Smith in 1835. These were followed by Moses Mitchell and Anthony Brown after the area became part of the Republic of Texas. These early settlers discovered the rolling prairie between Smothers and Ponton Creeks was ideal for raising horses and cattle and growing cotton and corn. By the 1870s, German immigrants replaced the earlier settlers and broke up the ranches into farms. A small settlement that included a store, blacksmith shop, and a cotton gin grew up on land belonging to the Wied brothers. A wave of Czech immigrants arrived in the area between the 1870s, 1880s and 1890s. The Wied post office was established in the store from 1889 to 1906. The population was 40 in the 1890s. F. F. Kuehn ran a private school which closed in 1895. In that year F. W. Wunderlich donated land for a public school. Czech Catholics built St. Ludmilla's Church in 1919. Cotton was the basis on the local economy. By the 1940s, Wied's population was 100 and there were three businesses. However, by the 1950s there were only about 40 persons living there and the store and cotton gin closed. In 2000 there were about 65 persons living in the area.

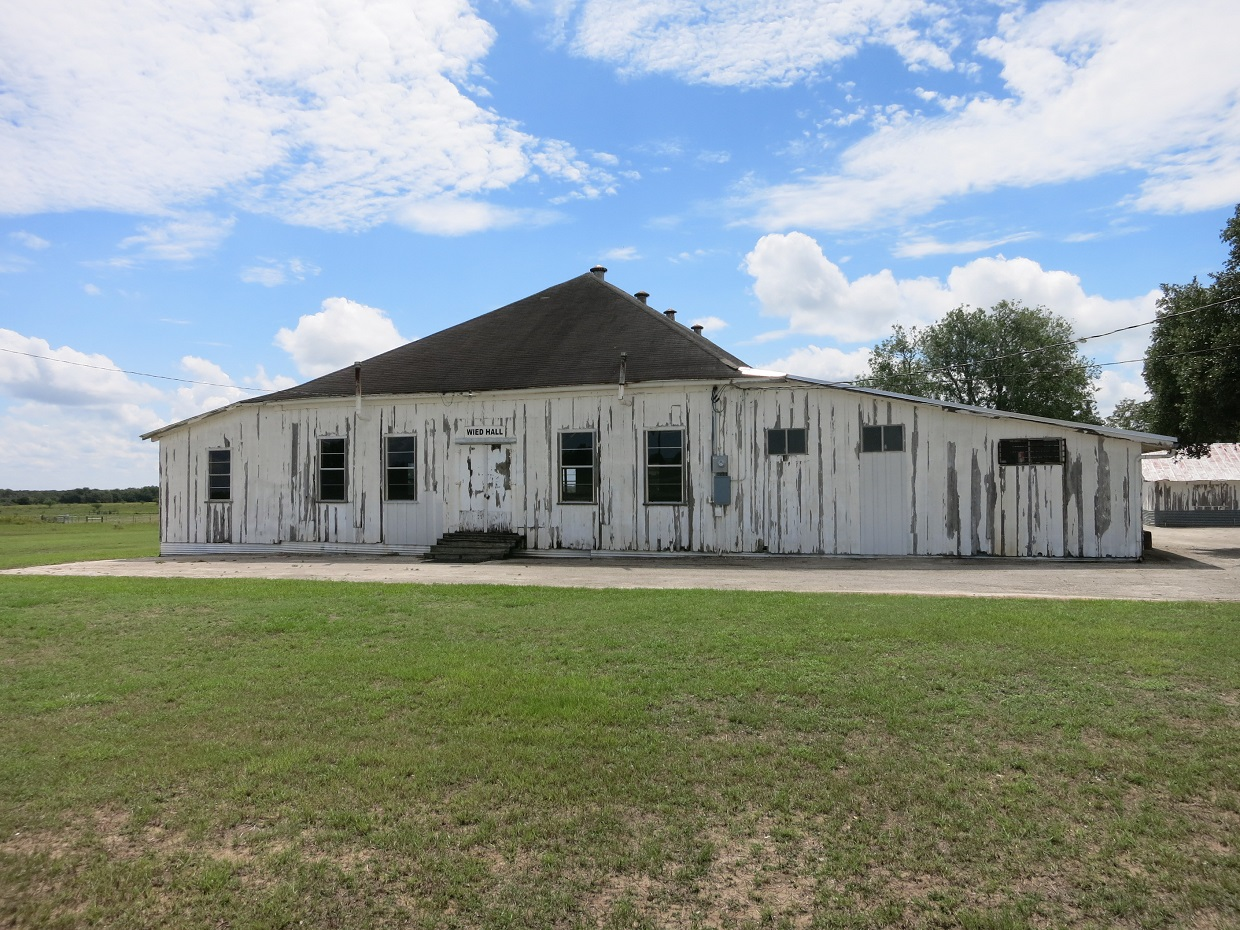
Wied Hall is on US 90A west of Hallettsville.

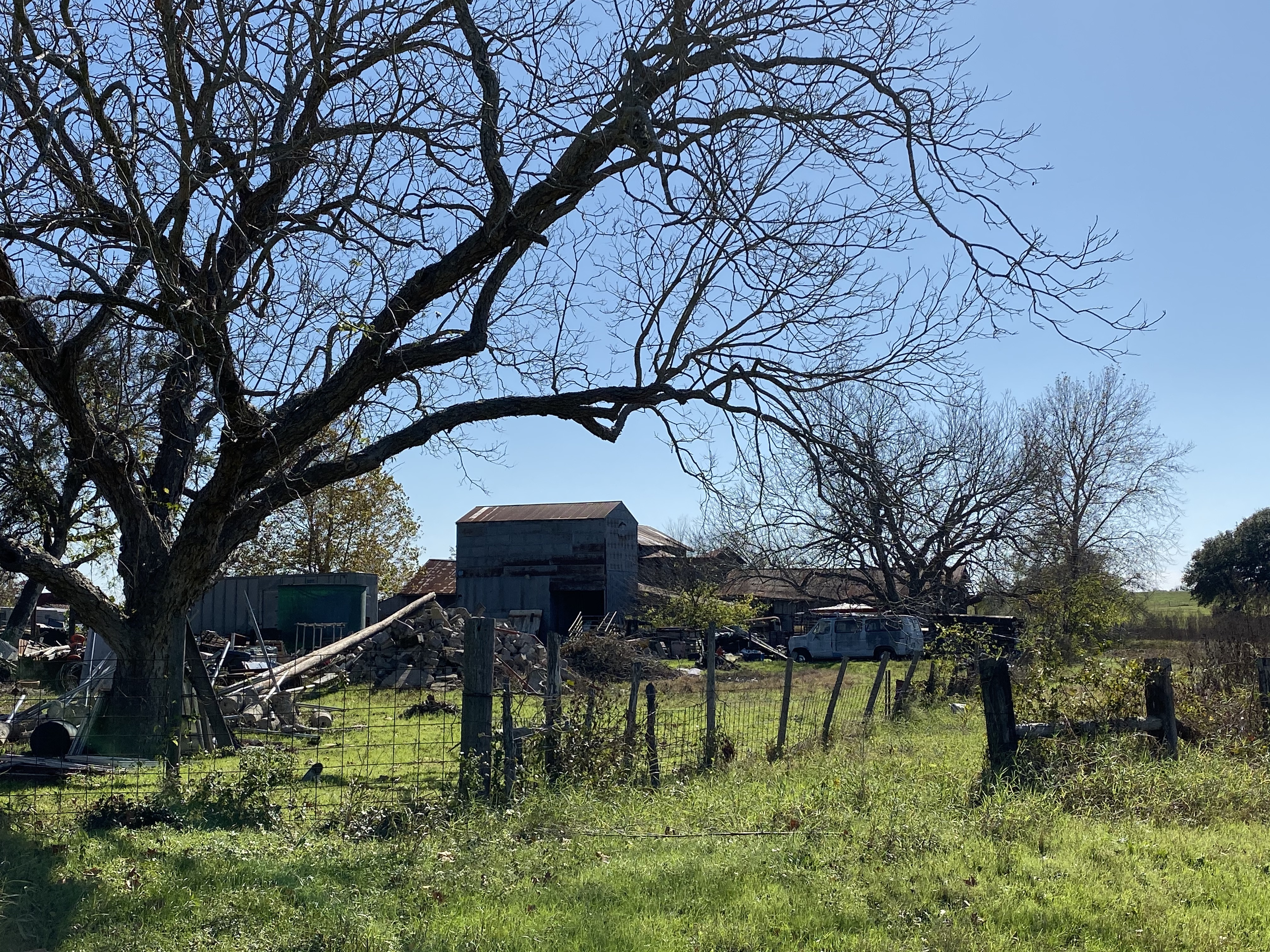
Ruins of Wied Cotton Gin in December 2019

== Education ==
The Vysehrad Elementary School is located to the east of Wied at 595 County Road 182. The school educates students from Kindergarten through 8th grade. It was established in 1887 on the Francis Smith League and is still at its original location. Total enrollment varies but currently stands at 119 students.
