= Petersburg (Lavaca County), Texas =

Coordinates: 29.3727°N 96.9073°W

Petersburg is a ghost town that was the seat of Lavaca County when it was organized in August 1846. It was located six miles southeast of Hallettsville on Farm to Market Road 2616 on the east bank of the Lavaca River.

== History ==
The townsite, 300 acres of land given by Arthur Sherill in 1846. Petersburg's first post office was established in 1848. Petersburg was a crossroads for early Texians at the intersection of the San Felipe-Gonzales-San Antonio and the Victoria-Columbus roads. After single building which was used as a combined courthouse, church, school, and sheriff's office burned to the ground, a new courthouse was constructed in mid-1850s. Between the fire and new construction county business was held in various buildings or under the trees, and prisoners were locked in barns or private homes. In 1852 Hallettsville was made the new county seat. It required arms to secure the county archives from the citizens of Petersburg. During the Civil War the school had to close for lack of pupils. In 1876 the post office was moved to nearby Williamsburg. The final building on the site in 1963 was a home which was built with the old post oak lumber from the Petersburg courthouse.
