= KTXM =

Coordinates: 29°27′45″N 96°56′04″W

- Hallettsville, Texas; United States
- Broadcast area: Shiner, Texas; Schulenburg, Texas
- Frequency: 99.9 MHz
- Branding: Texas Thunder Radio

Programming
- Format: Country

Ownership
- Owner: Kremling Enterprises, Inc.
- Sister stations: KYKM

History
- First air date: February 25, 1998

Technical information
- Licensing authority: FCC
- Facility ID: 77834
- Class: A
- ERP: 3,400 watts
- HAAT: 106 meters (348 ft)
- Repeater: 94.3 KYKM (Yoakum)

Links
- Public license information: Public file; LMS
- Webcast: Listen live
- Website: txthunderradio.com

KTXM (99.9 FM; "Texas Thunder Radio") is a commercial radio station airing a country music format licensed to Hallettsville, Texas, United States, simulcasting 94.3 KYKM Yoakum. The station is owned by Kremling Enterprises, Inc.

On May 30, 2025, the Federal Communications Commission revoked the broadcast licenses for KTXM and sister station KYKM(FM) due to delinquent regulatory fees from FY 2017-21and FY 2024. The order also dismissed pending renewal applications for the stations. The FCC had issued a "Pay or Show Cause Order" in January 2024.
