= Kinkler, Texas =

- Unincorporated community
- Location within Texas Location within the United States
- Coordinates: 29°32′03″N 96°53′57″W
- Country: United States
- State: Texas
- County: Lavaca
- Elevation: 256 ft (78 m)
- Time zone: UTC-6 (Central (CST))
  - Summer (DST): UTC-5 (CDT)
- Area code: 361
- GNIS feature ID: 1378526

Kinkler is an unincorporated community in Lavaca County, Texas, United States. The community is located on U.S. Route 77, 7 miles (11 km) north of Hallettsville.

== History ==
Kinkler is named for Jack Kinkler, who settled in the area in 1875. The community had a school by 1880 and a post office by 1885; the post office closed in 1905. Due to its proximity to Hallettsville and Schulenberg, Kinkler never had a significant commercial district; its first listing in the Texas Almanac, in 1933, listed two businesses there. As of 2000, the community's population was 75.
