= Wied =

Wied may mean:

== Places ==
- County of Wied, a County of Rhineland-Palatinate, Germany
- Wied (river), in Rhineland-Palatinate, Germany
- Wied, Rhineland-Palatinate, a community in Rhineland-Palatinate, Germany
- Wied, Texas, an unincorporated area in Texas, USA

== People with the surname ==
- David de Wied (1925–2004), Dutch professor of pharmacology
- Elisabeth of Wied (1843–1916), Queen of Romania, widely known by her literary name of Carmen Sylva
- Friedrich IV of Wied (1518–1568), Archbishop-Elector of Cologne
- Gustav Wied (1858–1914), Danish writer
- Hermann of Wied (1477–1552), Archbishop-Elector of Cologne
- Steve Wied, former drummer of the American grunge band Tad
- Thekla Carola Wied (born 1944), German actress
- Theoderich von Wied (c. 1170–1242), Archbishop and Prince-elector of Trier
- Tony Wied (born 1976), American politician
- Wilhelm of Wied (1876–1945), briefly a ruler of Albania

== See also ==
- Wiet, people with this name
- Weid (disambiguation)
