= Hallettsville High School =

Public school in Texas, United States

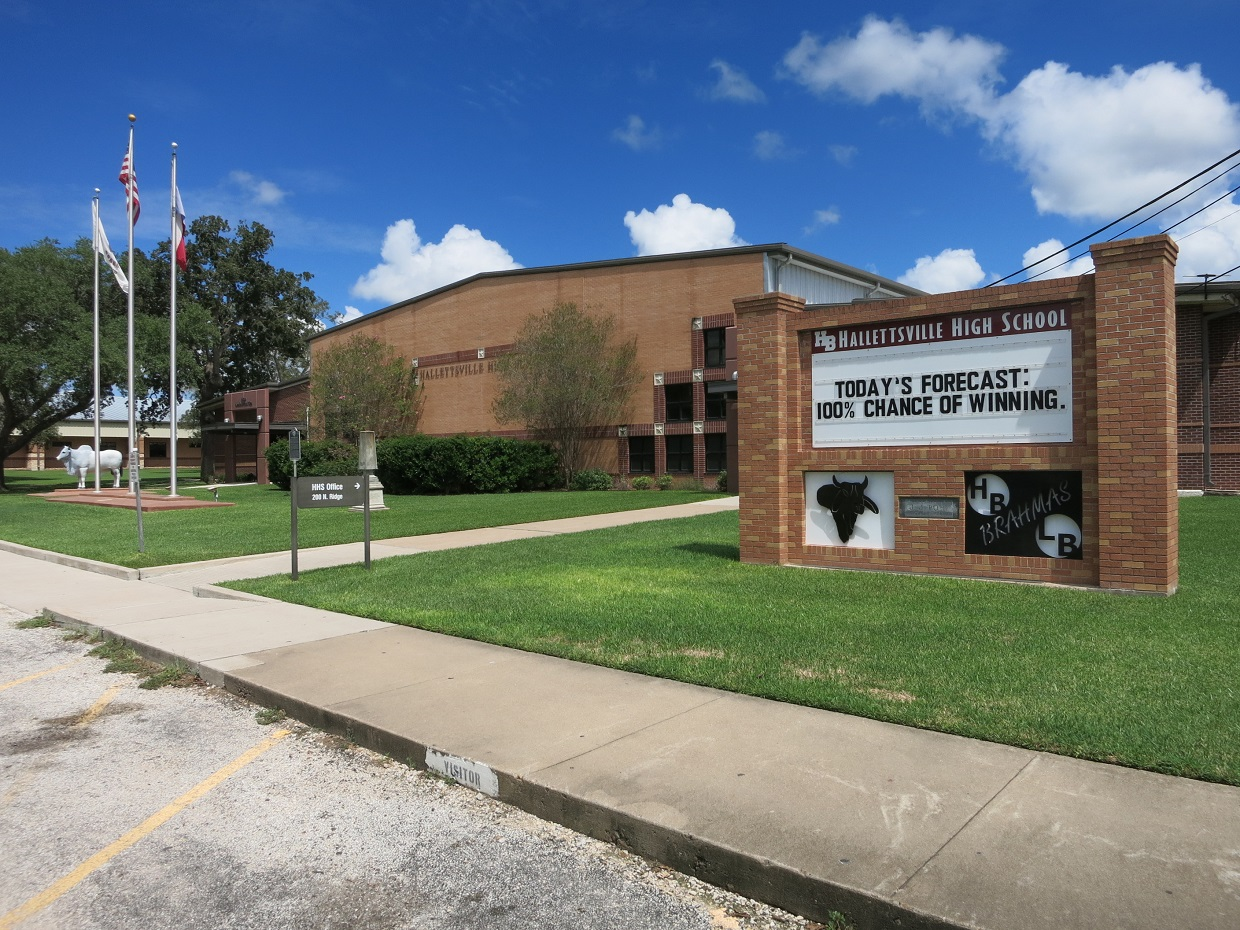

Location
- 200 N. Ridge St; Hallettsville, Texas 77964; United States
- Coordinates: 29.4474°N 96.9352°W

Information
- School type: Public High school
- School district: Hallettsville Independent School District
- Principal: Mason Briscoe
- Teaching staff: 36.22 (on an FTE basis)
- Grades: 9–12
- Enrollment: 424 (2023–2024)
- Student to teacher ratio: 11.71
- Colors: Maroon and white
- Athletics conference: UIL Class AAA
- Mascot: Brahma
- Yearbook: The Brahma
- Website: Hallettsville High School

Hallettsville High School is a public high school located in the city of Hallettsville, Texas, USA, and classified as a 3A school by the University Interscholastic League. It is a part of the Hallettsville Independent School District located in central Lavaca County. In 2015, the school was rated "Met Standard" by the Texas Education Agency.

== Athletics ==
The Hallettsville Brahmas compete in volleyball, cross country, American football, basketball, powerlifting, golf, tennis, track, baseball and softball.

=== State titles ===
- Baseball
  - 1995 (3A), 1997 (3A), 2013 (2A)
- Softball
  - 2022(3A)

==== State finalist ====
- Softball
  - 2009 (3A), 2015 (3A), 2019 (3A)
- American football
  - 2020 (3A/D1)

== Notable alumni ==
- Jonathon Brooks (class of 2021), running back for the Texas Longhorns
