= Charlie Hall (linebacker) =

American football player (born 1948)

No. 59
- Position: Linebacker

Personal information
- Born: December 2, 1948 (age 77); Yoakum, Texas, U.S.
- Listed height: 6 ft 3 in (1.91 m)
- Listed weight: 220 lb (100 kg)

Career information
- High school: Yoakum
- College: Houston
- NFL draft: 1971: 3rd round, 68th overall pick

Career history
- Cleveland Browns (1971–1980)

Awards and highlights
- Second-team All-American (1970)

Career NFL statistics
- Interceptions: 13
- Fumble recoveries: 9
- Touchdowns: 2
- Stats at Pro Football Reference

Charles Leslie Hall (born December 2, 1948) is an American former professional football player who was a linebacker in the National Football League (NFL). He was selected 68th overall by the Cleveland Browns in the third round of the 1971 NFL draft. Hall started every regular season and playoff game played by the Browns from 1972 to 1980.

He played college football from 1967 to 1970 for the Houston Cougars. In November 1968, Houston defeated Tulsa 100-6, setting a record for points scored in a Division I college football game.
