= KYKM =

KYKM may refer to:

- Yakima Air Terminal, Washington state, US, ICAO code KYKM
- KYKM (FM), a radio station licensed to Yoakum, Texas, US
