= Andy Rice =

American football player (1940–2018)

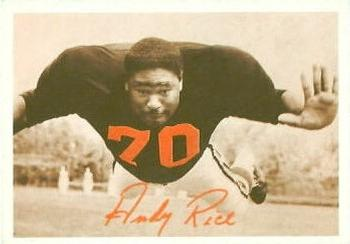

No. 58, 80, 70, 79
- Position: Defensive tackle

Personal information
- Born: September 6, 1940; Hallettsville, Texas, U.S.
- Died: February 11, 2018 (aged 77); Spring, Texas, U.S.
- Listed height: 6 ft 2 in (1.88 m)
- Listed weight: 268 lb (122 kg)

Career information
- High school: Hallettsville (TX)
- College: Texas Southern
- NFL draft: 1965: undrafted

Career history
- Kansas City Chiefs (1966–1967); Houston Oilers (1967); Cincinnati Bengals (1968–1969); San Diego Chargers (1970–1971); Chicago Bears (1972–1973)
- Stats at Pro Football Reference

Andrew Rice (September 6, 1940 – February 11, 2018) was an American professional football player. He played college football for Texas Southern, and went to the American Football League's Kansas City Chiefs in 1965. After winning the American Football League Championship with the Chiefs in 1966, he started for them in the first AFL-NFL World Championship Game. Rice died on February 11, 2018.

== See also ==
- Other American Football League players
