= Damion Ratley =

American football player (born 1995)

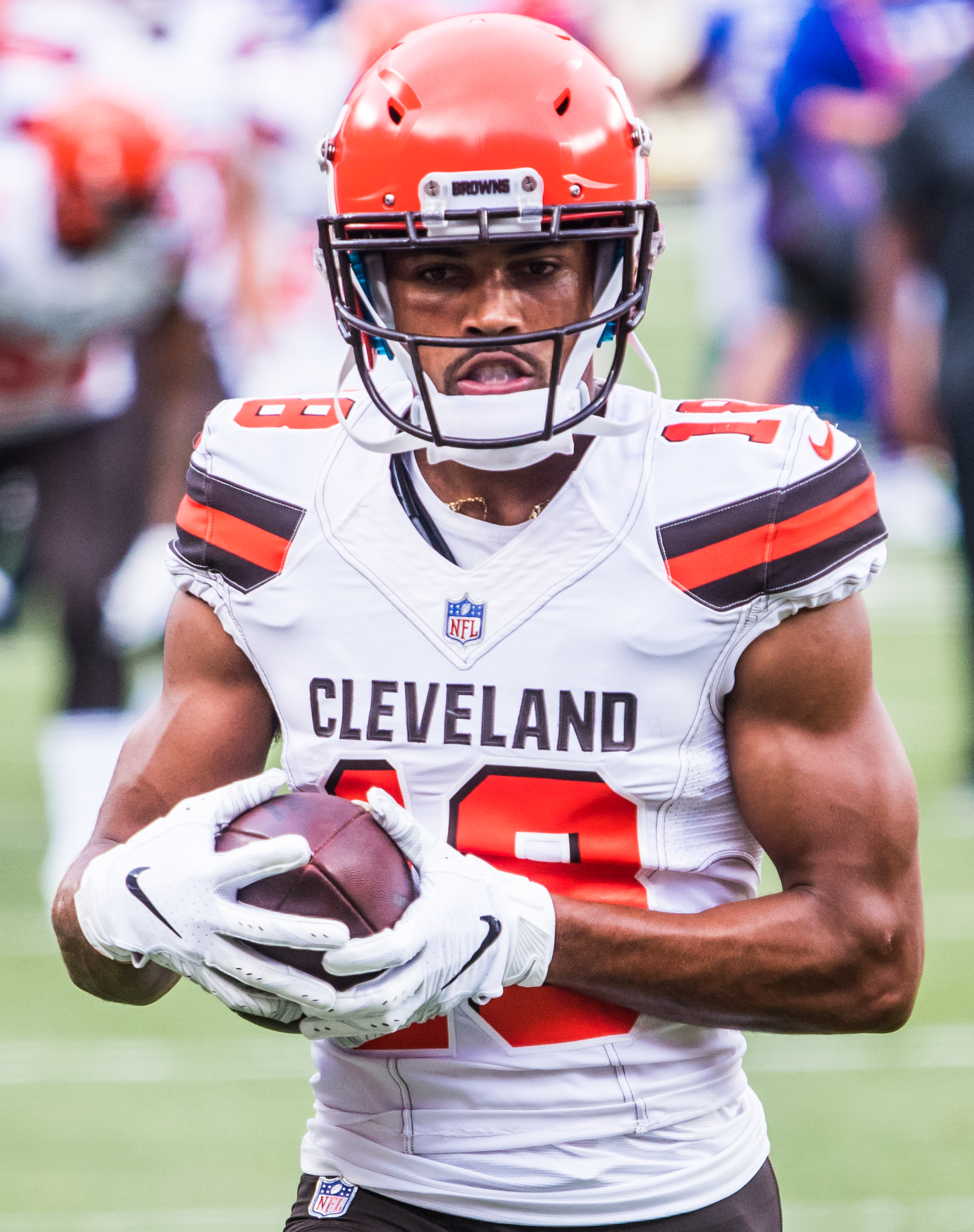
- Ratley with the Cleveland Browns in 2018

No. 18, 19
- Position: Wide receiver

Personal information
- Born: April 16, 1995 (age 31); Yoakum, Texas, U.S.
- Listed height: 6 ft 2 in (1.88 m)
- Listed weight: 200 lb (91 kg)

Career information
- High school: Yoakum
- College: Texas A&M (2016–2017)
- NFL draft: 2018: 6th round, 175th overall pick

Career history
- Cleveland Browns (2018–2019); New York Giants (2020); Houston Texans (2020); Detroit Lions (2021)*; Dallas Cowboys (2021)*; Minnesota Vikings (2021)*
- * Offseason or practice squad member only

Career NFL statistics
- Receptions: 29
- Receiving yards: 407
- Receiving touchdowns: 1
- Stats at Pro Football Reference

Damion Ratley (born April 16, 1995) is an American former professional football player who was a wide receiver in the National Football League (NFL). He played college football for the Texas A&M Aggies. He has played for the Cleveland Browns, New York Giants, Houston Texans, and Detroit Lions.

== Early life ==
Ratley attended and played high school football at Yoakum High School.

== College career ==
Ratley played two seasons for the Aggies after transferring from Blinn College. Over the course of 37 games (17 starts), Ratley caught 47 passes for 920 yards and eight touchdowns.

== Professional career ==
=== Cleveland Browns ===
Ratley was selected by the Cleveland Browns in the sixth round (175th overall) in the 2018 NFL draft.

On May 6, 2018, Ratley signed a rookie contract worth about $2.575 million. It includes a signing bonus worth over $160,000. He made his NFL debut in Week 2 against the New Orleans Saints. In Week 6 against the Los Angeles Chargers, he had six receptions for 82 receiving yards for his first professional statistics.

Ratley was waived by the Browns on September 5, 2020.

=== New York Giants ===
On September 6, 2020, Ratley was claimed off waivers by the New York Giants. He was waived by New York on October 13.

=== Houston Texans ===
On October 20, 2020, Ratley was signed to the practice squad of the Houston Texans. On December 28, Ratley was signed to Houston's active roster. He was waived on March 16, 2021.

=== Detroit Lions ===
Ratley signed with the Detroit Lions on March 24, 2021. He was waived by Detroit on August 30.

=== Dallas Cowboys ===
Ratley signed with the Dallas Cowboys' practice squad on September 21, 2021. He was released on November 16.

=== Minnesota Vikings ===
On December 15, 2021, Ratley was signed to the Minnesota Vikings practice squad. He was waived on December 28.

== NFL career statistics ==
=== Regular season ===
Year	Team	GP	Receiving							Fumbles	
Year	Team	GP	Rec	Tgt	Yds	Avg	Lng	TD	FD	Fum	Lost
2018	CLE	13	13	20	144	11.1	27	0	5	0	0
2019	CLE	13	12	24	200	16.7	46	1	11	0	0
2020	NYG	5	4	10	63	15.8	29	0	2	1	0
Total		31	29	54	407	14.0	46	1	18	1	0
