= KYKM (FM) =

Coordinates: 29.3510°N 97.1924°W

- Yoakum, Texas; United States
- Broadcast area: Gonzales, Texas; Schulenburg, Texas
- Frequency: 94.3 MHz
- Branding: Texas Thunder Radio

Programming
- Format: Country

Ownership
- Owner: Kremling Enterprises, Inc.
- Sister stations: KTXM

History
- First air date: July 6, 1981
- Former call signs: KYOC (1981–1995)
- Former frequencies: 102.3 MHz (1981–1990); 92.5 MHz (1990–2013)
- Call sign meaning: Appears as "Kick 'em" (former branding)

Technical information
- Licensing authority: FCC
- Facility ID: 67287
- Class: A
- ERP: 3,000 watts
- HAAT: 91 meters (299 ft)
- Repeater: 99.9 KTXM (Hallettsville)

Links
- Public license information: Public file; LMS
- Webcast: radio.securenetsystems.net/v5/kykm
- Website: txthunderradio.com

KYKM (94.3 FM; "Texas Thunder Radio") is a radio station airing a country music format licensed to Yoakum, Texas, and simulcasted on sister station 99.9 KTXM in Hallettsville. The station is owned by Kremling Enterprises, Inc. of Shiner, Texas.

On May 30, 2025, the Federal Communications Commission revoked the broadcast licenses for KYKM and sister station KTXM(FM) due to delinquent regulatory fees from FY 2017-21and FY 2024. The order also dismissed pending renewal applications for the stations. The FCC had issued a "Pay or Show Cause Order" in January 2024.
