= Ezzell =

Ezzell may refer to:

- Candy Ezzell (born 1953), American politician from New Mexico
- Homer Ezzell, American baseball player
- Jim Ezzell (1936–1991), American politician from North Carolina
- Ezzell Independent School District, American public school district
