= Sacred Heart Catholic School (Hallettsville, Texas) =

Location
- 313 South Texana Street; Hallettsville, Texas, (Lavaca County) 77964; United States; 29°26′32″N 96°56′28″W

Information
- Type: Private, Coeducational
- Religious affiliation: Roman Catholic
- Established: 1882
- Principal: Kevin Haas
- Grades: Pre-K–12
- Colors: Blue Gray and White
- Athletics conference: TAPPS 2A
- Mascot: Indians
- Team name: Indians and Braves
- Rival: Shiner St. Paul High School
- Tuition: $2,450
- Website: Sacred Heart Catholic School

Sacred Heart Catholic School is a private, Roman Catholic K-12 school in Hallettsville, Texas. It is located in the Roman Catholic Diocese of Victoria in Texas.

== Background ==
Sacred Heart was established as an all-girls boarding school by the Sisters of the Incarnate Word and Blessed Sacrament in 1882. Boys were admitted in 1892. The high school portion of the school was closed in 1926 and reopened in 1948.
