= Hallettsville Independent School District =

School district in Texas, United States

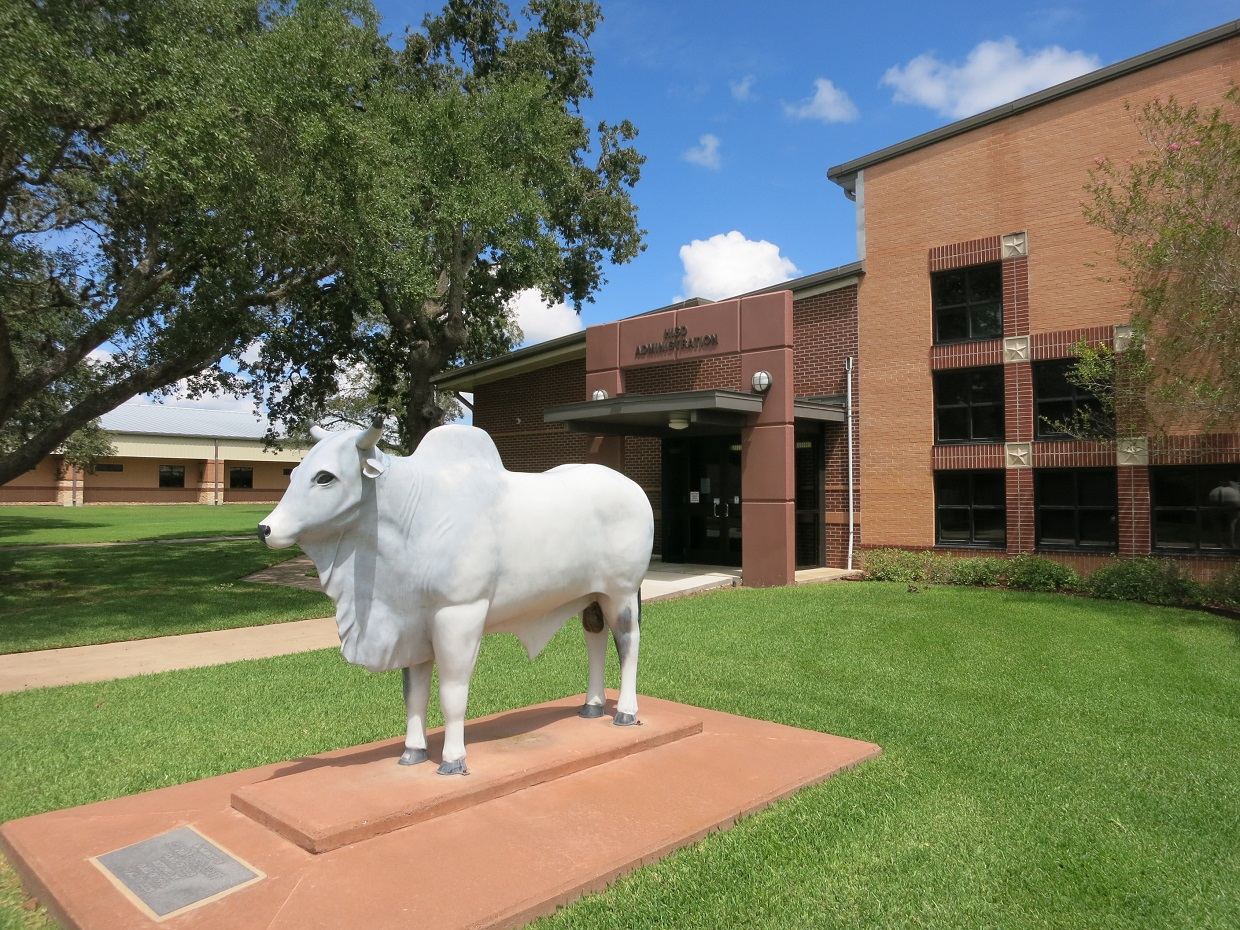
- Hallettsville ISD administration offices

Address
- 302 North Ridge St Hallettsville, Lavaca County, Texas, 77964; United States

District information
- Grades: PK-12
- Established: 1907
- Superintendent: Dr. Jo Ann Bludau
- School board: Robert Lundy, Pres, Matthew Felcman, VP, Marna Klimitchek, Sec, Brian Smith, Billy Gerke, Chris Ranly
- Schools: 3
- NCES District ID: 4822120

Students and staff
- Students: 1,168
- Teachers: 92.38 (on an FTE basis)
- Student–teacher ratio: 12.64:1
- District mascot: Brahmas

Other information
- Website: www.hisdbrahmas.org

Hallettsville Independent School District is a public school district based in Hallettsville, Texas, United States.

Located in Lavaca County, very small portions of the district extend into Colorado and Jackson Counties. It covers the Vysehrad Independent School District for high school.

Hallettsville ISD received a "B" rating from the Texas Education Agency for the 2022-2023 school year.

== Schools ==
- Hallettsville High School(grades 9-12) (in addition, high school students from the neighboring Sweet Home Independent School District, Vysehrad Independent School District, and Ezzell Independent School District have the option to attend here)
- Hallettsville Junior High School (grades 5-8)
- Hallettsville Elementary School (prekindergarten - grade 4)
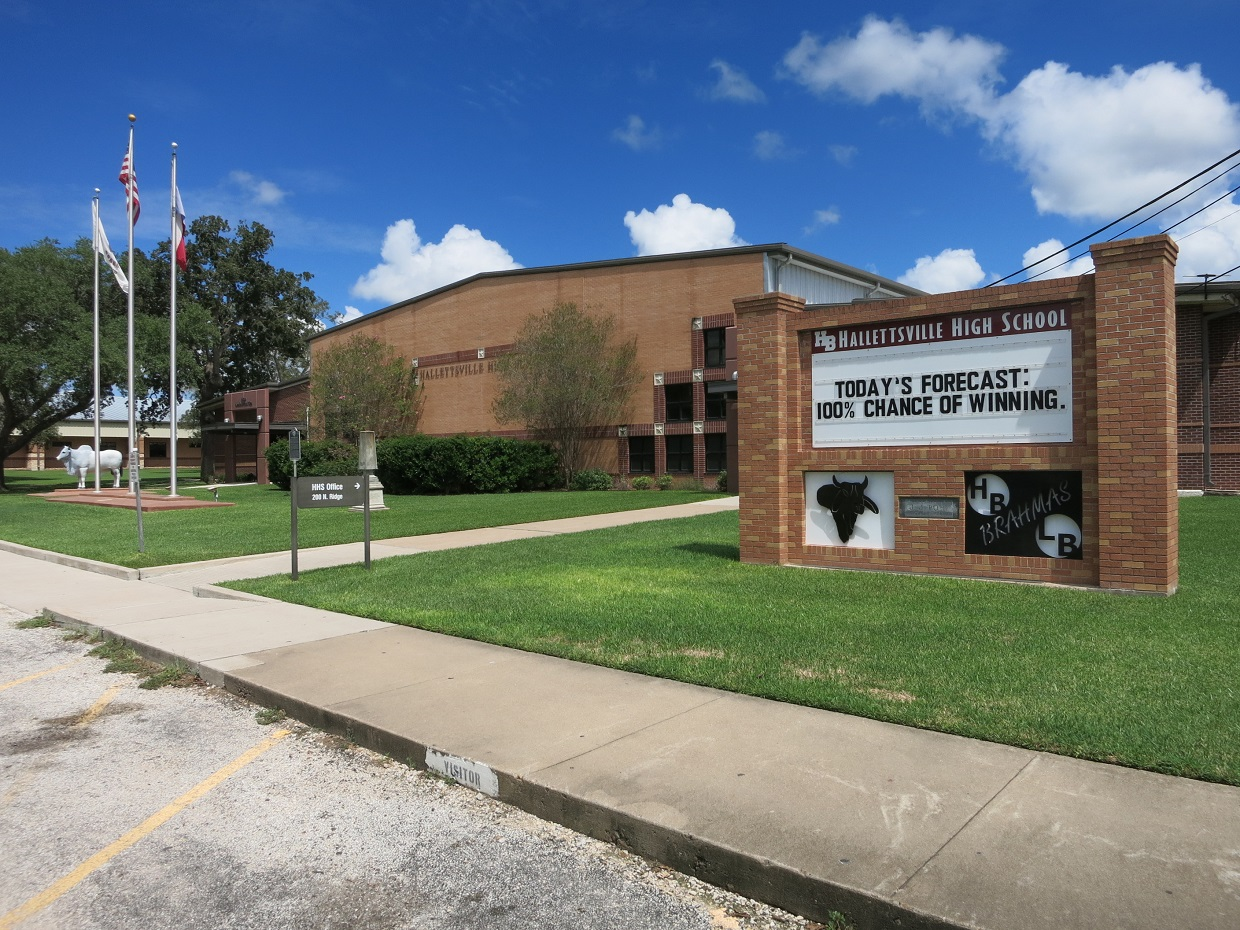
Hallettsville High School at 200 N Ridge St

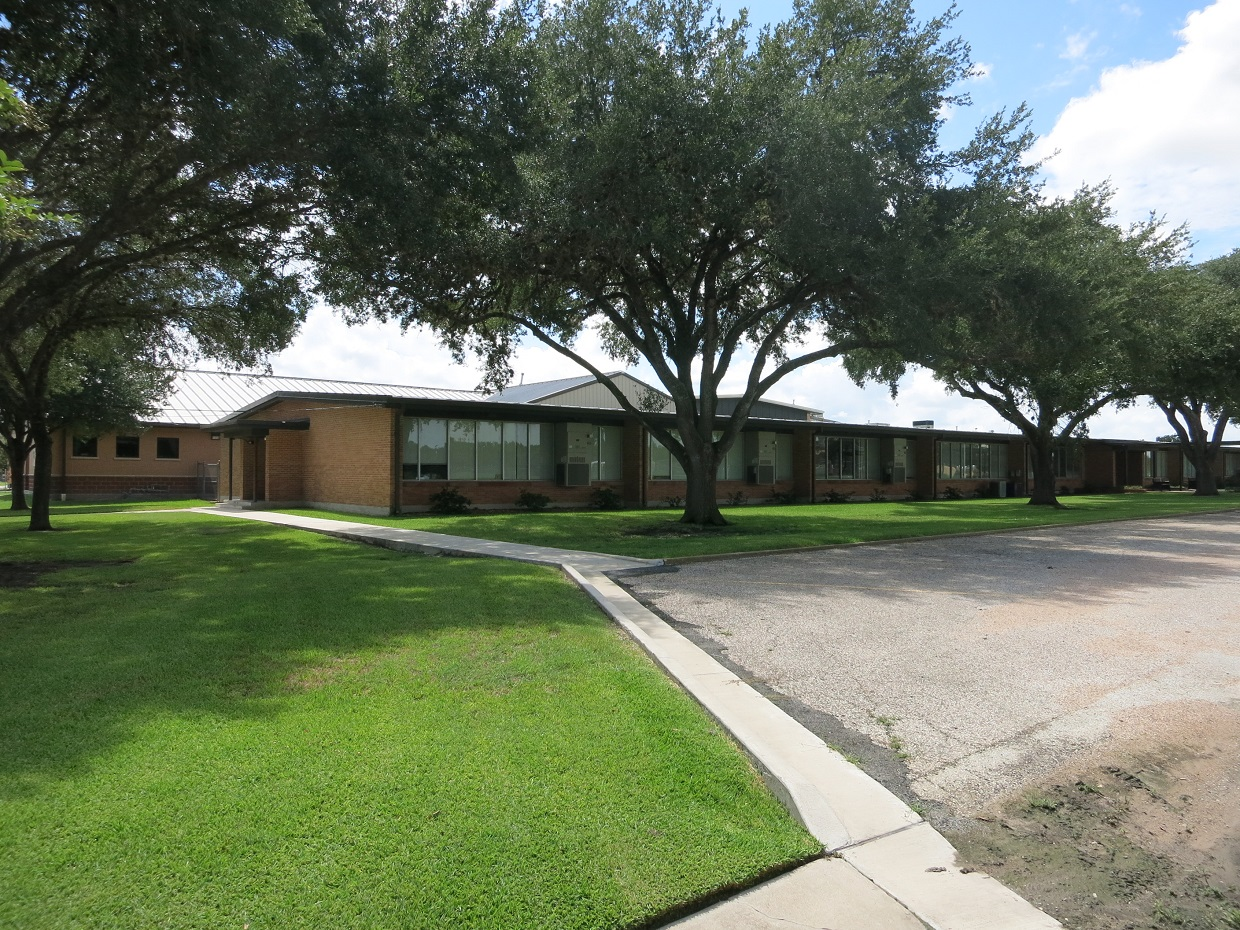
Hallettsville Junior High School at 410 S Russell St

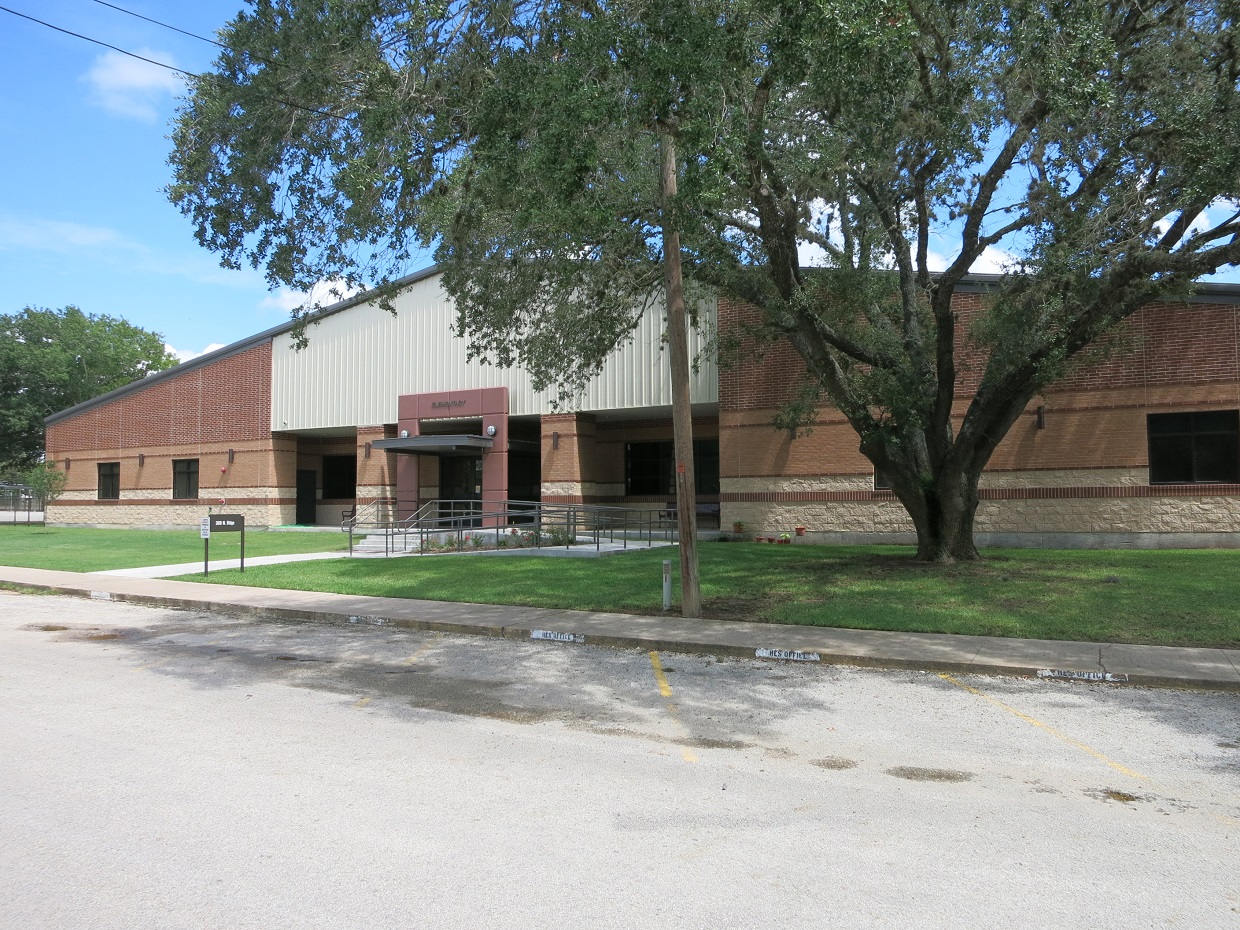
Hallettsville Elementary School at 308 N Ridge St

== History ==
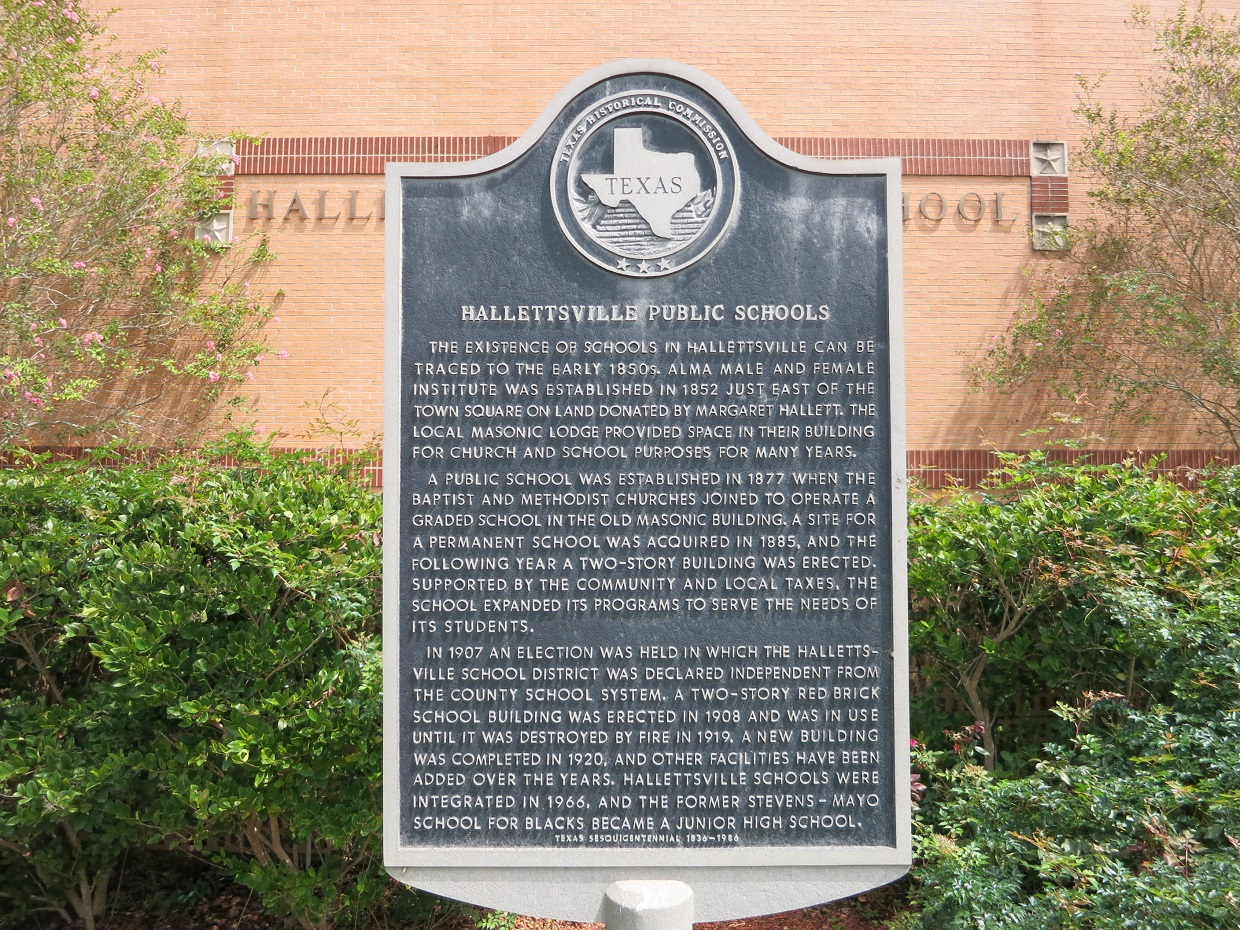
Texas Historical Commission marker at high school

== Other information ==
- Boys' mascot: brahmas
- Girls' mascot: lady brahmas
- School colors: maroon and white

== State championships ==
- 1994-1995: Baseball (Conference 3A), coach: Jimmy Appelt
- 1996-1997: Baseball (Conference 3A), coach: Jimmy Appelt
- 2012-2013: Baseball (Conference 2A), coach: Shorty Cook
- 2021-2022: Softball (Conference 3A), coach: Callie Kresta

== State appearances ==
- 1976-1977: football (Conference 2A), state semifinalists
- 1991-1992: baseball (Conference 3A), state semifinalists, coach: Jimmy Appelt
- 1994-1995: baseball (Conference 3A), state champions, coach: Jimmy Appelt
- 1996-1997: baseball (Conference 3A), state champions, coach: Jimmy Appelt
- 1997-1998: baseball (Conference 3A), state semifinalists, coach: Jimmy Appelt
- 2008-2009: softball (Conference 2A), state finalists, coach: Mike Mikeska
- 2009-2010: boys' basketball (Conference 2A), state semifinalists, coach: Rich Dozier
- 2010-2011: boys' basketball (Conference 2A), state semifinalists, coach: Rich Dozier
- 2012-2013: baseball (Conference 2A), state champions, coach: Shorty Cook
- 2013-2014: girls' basketball (Conference 2A), state semifinalists, coach: Amy Powell
- 2014-2015: softball (Conference 3A), state finalists, coach: Mike Mikeska
- 2018-2019: softball (Conference 3A), state finalists, coach: Mike Mikeska
- 2020-2021: football (Conference 3A), state finalists, coach: Tommy Psencik
- 2021-2022: softball (Conference 3A), state champions, coach: Callie Kresta
