= Moulton, Texas =

- Town
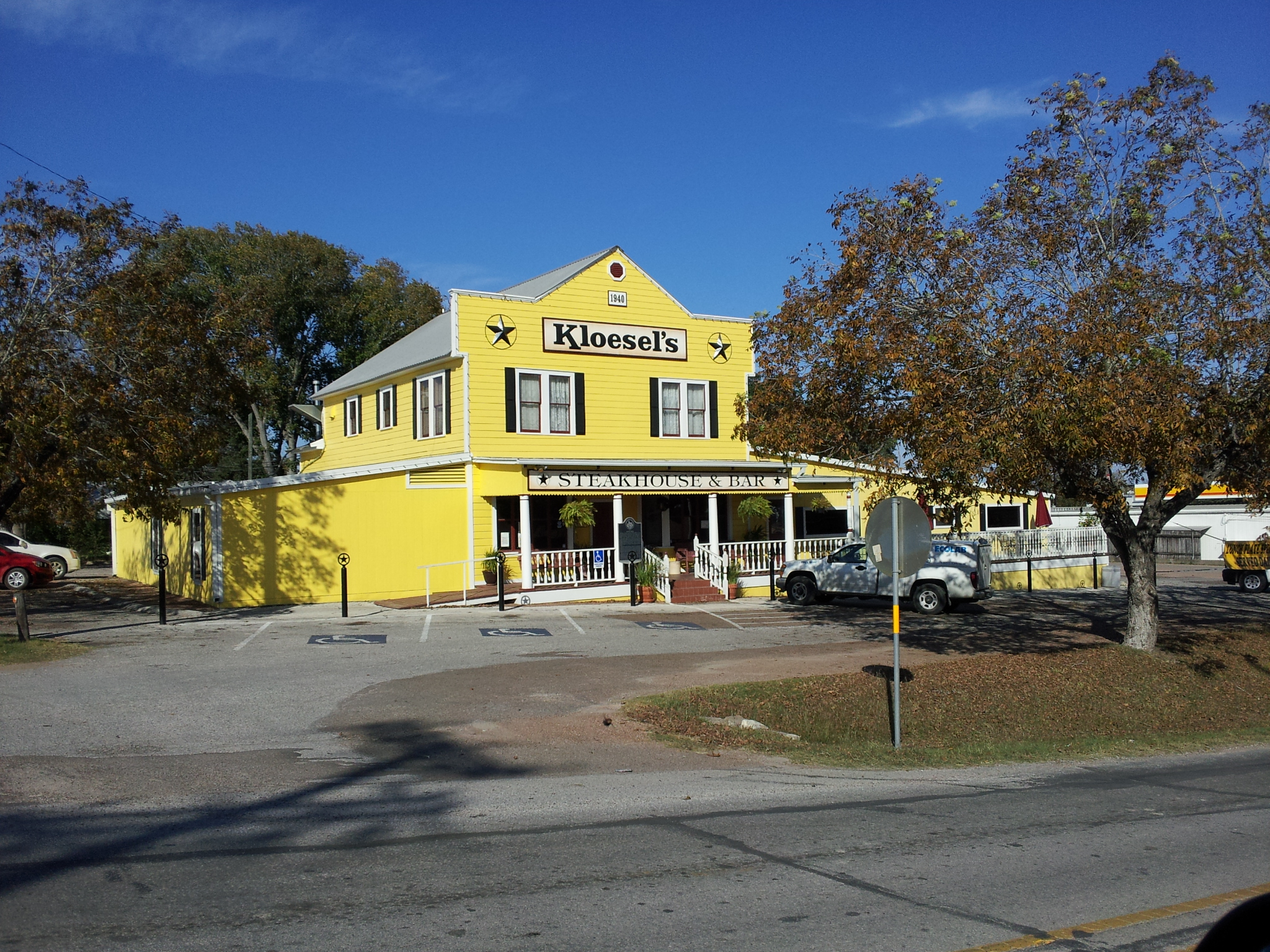
- Moulton, Texas

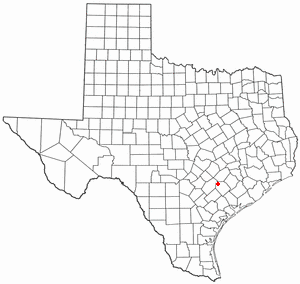
- Location of Moulton, Texas

- Coordinates: 29°34′26″N 97°8′47″W
- Country: United States
- State: Texas
- County: Lavaca

Government
  - City Council: Mayor Mark Zimmerman; Mike Ramirez; Nathan Beyer; Donald Wagner; Kelley Moeller; Darryl Helfer

Area
  - Total: 0.83 sq mi (2.16 km^{2})
  - Land: 0.83 sq mi (2.16 km^{2})
  - Water: 0 sq mi (0.00 km^{2})
- Elevation: 360 ft (110 m)

Population (2020)
  - Total: 854
  - Density: 1,076.4/sq mi (415.59/km^{2})
- Time zone: UTC-6 (Central (CST))
  - Summer (DST): UTC-5 (CDT)
- ZIP code: 77975
- Area code: 361
- FIPS code: 48-49560
- GNIS feature ID: 1342001
- Website: www.cityofmoulton.com

Moulton is a town in Lavaca County, Texas, United States. Its population was 854 at the 2020 census.

== Geography ==
Moulton is located at 29°34′26″N 97°8′47″W.

According to the United States Census Bureau, the town has a total area of 0.8 square miles (2.1 km^{2}), all land.

== Demographics ==
Historical population
Census	Pop.	Note	%±
1880	109		—
1890	231		111.9%
1940	643		—
1950	692		7.6%
1960	646		−6.6%
1970	968		49.8%
1980	1,009		4.2%
1990	923		−8.5%
2000	944		2.3%
2010	886		−6.1%
2020	854		−3.6%
U.S. Decennial Census

Moulton racial composition as of 2020 (NH = Non-Hispanic) (Note: Note: the US Census treats Hispanic/Latino as an ethnic category. This table excludes Latinos from the racial categories and assigns them to a separate category. Hispanics/Latinos can be of any race.)
Race	Number	Percentage
White (NH)	560	65.57%
Black or African American (NH)	16	1.87%
Native American or Alaska Native (NH)	1	0.12%
Asian (NH)	1	0.12%
Multiracial (NH)	23	2.69%
Hispanic or Latino	253	29.63%
Total	854	

As of the 2020 United States census, 854 people, 369 households, and 224 families were residing in the town.

As of the 2000 census, 944 people, 383 households, and 243 families resided in the town. The population density was 1,147.2 inhabitants per square mile (442.9/km^{2}). The 451 housing units had an average density of 548.1 per square mile (211.6/km^{2}). The racial makeup of the town was 95.87% White, 0.74% African American, 0.11% Asian, 2.33% from other races, and 0.95% from two or more races. Hispanics or Latinos of any race were 13.14% of the population.

Of the 383 households, 30.0% had children under 18 living with them, 52.5% were married couples living together, 9.1% had a female householder with no husband present, and 36.3% were not families. About 32.9% of all households were made up of individuals, and 24.0% had someone living alone who was 65or older. The average household size was 2.31, and the average family size was 2.97.

In the town, the age distribution was 23.3% under 18, 6.8% from 18 to 24, 22.5% from 25 to 44, 19.8% from 45 to 64, and 27.6% who were 65 or older. The median age was 43 years. For every 100 females, there were 89.9 males. For every 100 females 18 and over, there were 79.2 males.

The median income in the town for a household was $27,865 and for a family was $34,688. Males had a median income of $23,125 versus $18,971 for females. The per capita income for the town was $16,284. About 7.7% of families and 13.8% of the population were below the poverty line, including 14.0% of those under 18 and 20.9% of those 65 or over.

== Education ==
The town is served by the Moulton Independent School District.

== Media and journalism ==
=== Area newspapers ===
- The Moulton Eagle
