= Joseph S. Stiborik =

American soldier (1914–1984)

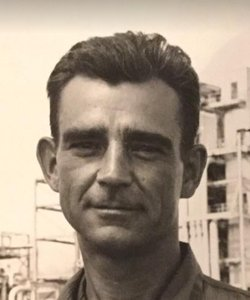
- Joseph Anton Stiborik
- Born: Joseph Anton Stiborik; 21 December 1914; Hallettsville, Texas, U.S.
- Died: 30 June 1984 (aged 69); Rockdale, Texas, U.S.
- Military career
- Allegiance: United States
- Branch: United States Army; Army Air Forces; United States Air Force
- Service years: 1942–1945
- Rank: Sergeant
- Commands: 509th Composite Group
- Conflicts: World War II; Atomic bombings of Hiroshima and Nagasaki

Sergeant Joseph S. Stiborik (21 December 1914 – 30 June 1984) was an American Sergeant in the United States Air Force. He is best known as the radar operator aboard the B-29 Superfortress known as the Enola Gay, when it dropped Little Boy, the first of two atomic bombs used in warfare, on the Japanese city of Hiroshima on 6 August 1945.

== Early life ==
Josepg Stiborik parents, Anton and Cecilia Najvar Stibork emigrated to the United States in 1907 from the highlands of Czechoslovakia, first settling in Oklahoma before moving to Texas, where his father worked as the editor of a Czech-language newspaper. Joseph was born on 21 December 1914 in Hallettsville, Texas and went attended Texas A&M University.

== Military service ==
Joseph Stiborik wanted to be a pilot but was at first rejected due to hereditary color blindness. In 1942 he volunteered to the Army Air Corps, where he was trained at the radar school to operate radar systems on U.S. army planes. While stationed at Pensacola, Florida he was visited by Colonel Paul Tibbets who convinced him to join the 509th Composite Group, a unit assigned for transporting and dropping nuclear weapons, as part of the Manhattan Project. Later 12 member were chosen to form the crew of the Enola Gay. On 6 August 1945 he played a crucial role in the success of dropping the first ever atomic bomb on Hiroshima. for his part in the mission he was awarded the Silver Star. Stiborik was discharged from service in November 1945.

== Late life ==
Joseph Stiborik returned to his family in Texas, later moving to Rockdale where he worked at the Industrial Generating Company. Joseph Stiborik died on 30 June 1984.

== Family ==
Joseph Stiborik had a brother who died just one year old, and three sisters, two of them also served in the US Army. He married his wife Helen on 1 August 1938 and had two daughters.
