= Weid =

Weid may refer to:

- Weid (Ulster), a river of Hesse and Thuringia, Germany, tributary of the Ulster
- Weid, a district of the municipality Gretzenbach, canton Solothurn, Switzerland
- WEID-LD, a television station in South Bend, Indiana, United States

== People with that name ==
- Henning Weid (born 1950), Norwegian Nordic combined skier

== See also ==
- Wied (disambiguation)
