= Breslau, Texas =

Unincorporated community in Texas, US

Coordinates: 29°31′23″N 96°59′48″W

Breslau is an unincorporated community in Lavaca County, Texas, United States. In the year 2000, its population numbered approximately 65. The community was named after the city of Breslau in Prussia, which is now Wrocław, Poland.
