= William Smeathers =

American pioneer (c. 1765/67 -1837)

- Born: unknown, c. 1765-1767 unknown, probably Pennsylvania or North Carolina
- Died: August 13, 1837; Columbia, Texas
- Other names: William Smithers, William Smothers
- Known for: Pioneer settler of Kentucky and Texas

William Smeathers (c. 1767 – August 13, 1837), also known as Smithers or Smothers, was a pioneer settler of Kentucky and later Texas.

Not much is known about his early days. He is believed to have been born in either Pennsylvania, Virginia or North Carolina. He may have been born as early as 1759 or as late as 1767. When Smeathers was 12 his father was killed by Indians and his mother died shortly thereafter, leaving young Smeathers to tend to his younger brother James and sister Mollie. He was married twice, the second time to Mary Winters of Tennessee. He had two sons, John and Archibald, and four daughters.

== Kentucky ==
In 1782 he was one of the first settlers in the Rough River area of Kentucky, where he built Smeathers Station. Smeathers was also an early settler of Fort Hartford (present-day Hartford in Ohio County), and he helped to build a fort at Vienna (later Calhoun in McLean County) on the Green River in the early 1780s. In 1797 or 1798 he built a home on the Ohio River, at a site that became known as Yellow Banks, becoming the first settler in what is now Owensboro, Kentucky. Smeathers served on first grand jury of Court of Quarter Sessions at Hartford, 1803. In 1808 he was appointed land commissioner of Ohio County. In 1809 he was tried for murder (under the name Bill Smothers) for killing a man who had allegedly raped his sister. He was acquitted but was advised to leave the area temporarily for his own safety. He served in the Kentucky "Corn Stalk" militia in 1803, and he served in the War of 1812 as a captain in the Kentucky Mounted Spies under the command of Major Toussaint Dubois.

== Texas ==
He reportedly visited Texas (then under Spanish rule) in 1810, and at some point he seems to have lived in Indiana. He eventually relocated to Texas, and in 1821 he helped Stephen F. Austin explore the coast to choose a location for Austin's first colony. In 1822 he was one of the five men who established a fort, Fort Bend, at a bend in the Brazos River near the site of present-day Richmond, Texas; the fort gave its name to present-day Fort Bend County. Smeathers is listed as one of the Old Three Hundred, original settlers in Austin's colony along the Brazos River in Mexican Texas, the first of many Americans to settle in Texas with the permission of the Mexican government. Later he was one of the first settlers in the DeWitt Colony in the Lavaca River valley area near current Hallettsville. His son and three grandsons fought in the Texas Revolution.

He died in Columbia, Texas, on August 13, 1837.

== Recognition ==
- There is a Bill Smeathers Park in Owensboro, Kentucky (Daviess County, Kentucky), where he is credited as the first settler. Kentucky Historical Marker #744 was erected in his honor at the park.
- Kentucky Historical Marker #1548 in Hartford, Kentucky, (Ohio County) honors Smeathers for his contribution in helping erect a fort there and at Vienna (later Calhoun in McLean County).
- A monument near Fort Bend, Texas, lists his name as "William Smithers" and commemorates his founding of Fort Bend with four other men.
- A Texas State Historical Marker on U.S. 77, 1 mile south of Hallettsville, lists his name as "William Smothers" and recounts his accomplishments.
- It is reported that a lake in Texas was named for him; this probably refers to Smithers Lake in Fort Bend County
- Smothers Creek in Lavaca County - also known as Smathers or Smeathers Creek - is named for him.
