= Wiet =

Wiet is both a masculine given name and a surname. Notable people with the name include:

== Given name ==
- Wiet Huidekoper (1953–2023), Dutch racecar designer and technical director
- Wiet Van Broeckhoven (1949–2019), Belgian radio presenter and writer

== Surname ==
- Gaston Wiet (1887–1971), French orientalist
- Helene Wiet (1871–1939), Austrian opera singer
- Magda Wiet-Hénin (born 1995), French taekwondo athlete
- Matt Wiet (born 1990), American former soccer player
- Orlando Wiet (1965–2026), Surinamese-Dutch kickboxer, boxer, and mixed martial artist
- Therese Wiet (1885–1971), Austrian operetta and concert singer

== See also ==
- Valérie Hénin (born 1967), French boxer, kickboxer and Muay Thai fighter
- Wied (disambiguation)
