= Moulton Independent School District =

School district in Texas, United States

Coordinates: 29.5785°N 97.1486°W

Address
- 500 North Pecan Street Moulton, Texas, 77975; United States

District information
- Grades: PK-12
- Schools: 2
- NCES District ID: 4831560

Students and staff
- Students: 293
- Teachers: 29.30 (on an FTE basis)
- Student–teacher ratio: 10.00:1

Other information
- Website: www.moultonisd.net

Moulton Independent School District is a public school district based in Moulton, Texas (USA).

Located in Lavaca County, a small portion of the district extends into Gonzales County.

In 2017, Moulton High School (MHS) received a "Met Standard" rating by the Texas Education Agency. With the rating, MHS also received seven out of seven distinction designations. MHS is one of 467 campuses (or 5.3%) that earned every distinction for which they were eligible. MHS met standards in Student Achievement, Student Progress, Closing Performance Gaps, and Post-secondary Readiness, and on top of that, the school earned the seven distinction designations available: Academic Achievement in ELA/Reading, Academic Achievement in Mathematics, Academic Achievement in Science, Academic Achievement in Social Studies, Top 25 Percent Student Progress, Top 25 Percent Closing Performance Gaps, and Post-secondary Readiness. Only campuses and districts that receive a Met Standard rating are eligible for distinction designations. There are 8, 757 campuses in Texas. 4,553 (52.0%) campuses earned one or more distinctions. 467 (5.3%) campuses earned every distinction for which they were eligible. Of the 1,203 districts evaluated, 58 (4.8%) districts earned the distinction for post-secondary readiness.

The Superintendent of Schools for the Moulton Independent School District is Dr. Renee Fairchild.

== Schools ==
Moulton ISD has two campuses - Moulton High (Grades 7-12) and Moulton Elementary (Grades PK-6).

== Extracurricular activities ==
The high school competes in the 1A classification under the University Interscholastic League in several extracurricular activities.

- Boys/Girls Basketball (over 30 state tournament appearances)
- Boys/Girls Cross Country (24 team appearances at the state meet)
- Boys/Girls Track
- Boys/Girls Golf (4 team appearances at the state meet)
- Boys/Girls Tennis
- Baseball
- Softball
- Cheer
- Academics
- Theatre Program (new for the 2023-24 school year and will compete in One-Act Play, Theatrical Design, and Filmmaking)

Other clubs/organizations sponsored by the school: FFA, 4H, Beta club, and Student Council.
