= Sweet Home Independent School District =

School district in Texas, United States

Address
- 7508 FM 531 Sweet Home, Texas, 77987; United States

District information
- Grades: PK-8
- Schools: 1
- NCES District ID: 4842000

Students and staff
- Students: 148
- Teachers: 12.82 (on an FTE basis)
- Student–teacher ratio: 11.54:1

Other information
- Website: www.sweethomeisd.org

Sweet Home Independent School District is a public school district based in the community of Sweet Home, Texas, United States.

It is a small country school located a few miles north of Yoakum. It teaches children kindergarten through eighth grade. High school students attend school in either the Yoakum Independent School District (the district states that most students choose this option; thus, it aligns its calendar with Yoakum's) or the Hallettsville Independent School District.

In 2009, the school district was rated "recognized" by the Texas Education Agency.
