= Yoakum High School =

Public school in Texas, United States

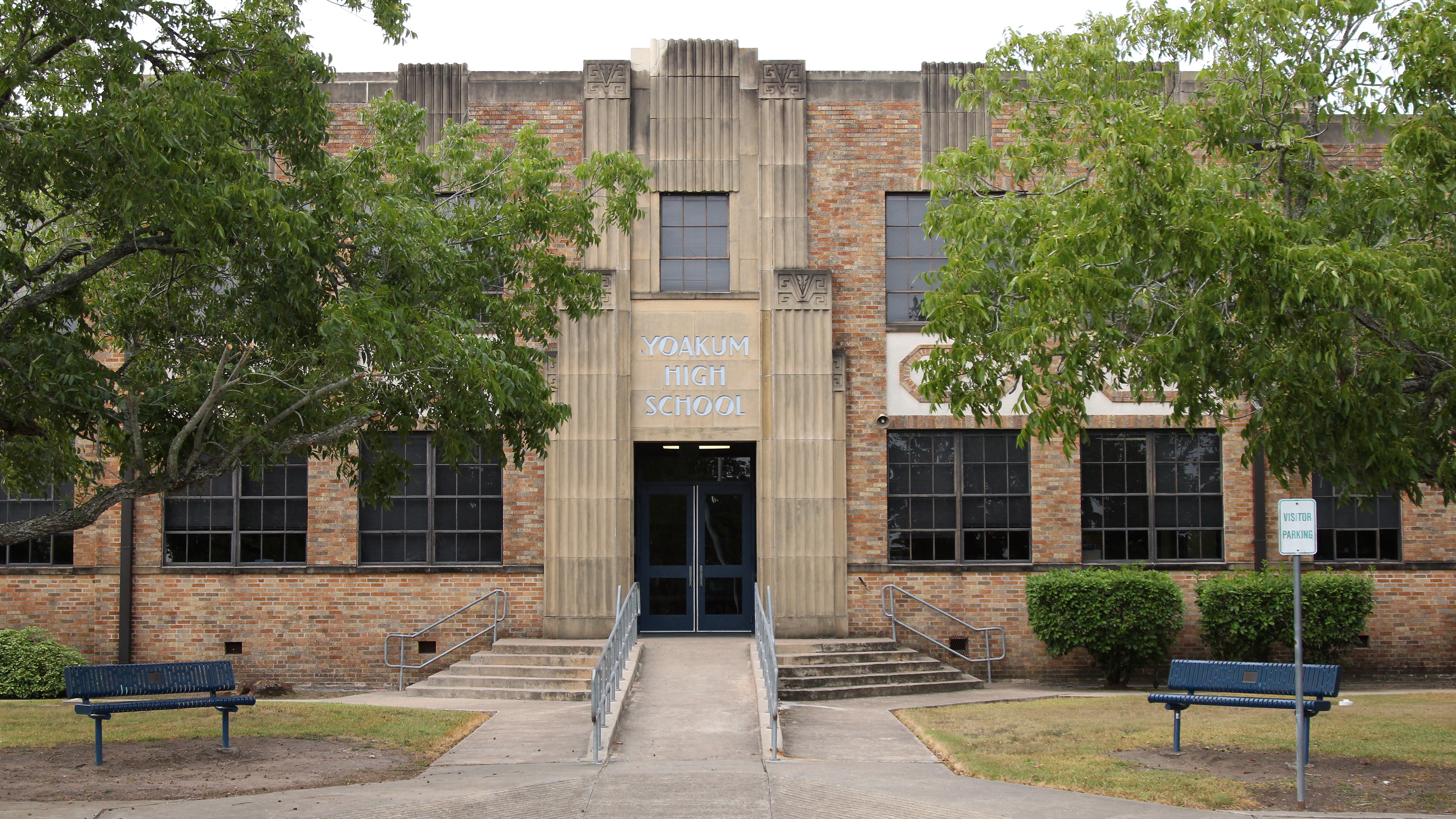

Location
- 104 Poth St. Yoakum, Texas 77995; United States; 29.29035°N 97.15926°W

Information
- School type: Public high school
- Established: 1937
- School district: Yoakum Independent School District
- Principal: Jill Cox
- Staff: 45.55 (on an FTE basis)
- Grades: 9–12
- Enrollment: 482 (2022–23)
- Student to teacher ratio: 10.58
- Colors: Blue, white, and gray
- Athletics conference: UIL Class AAA
- Mascot: Bulldog
- Yearbook: The Bow Wow
- Website: highschool.yoakumisd.net
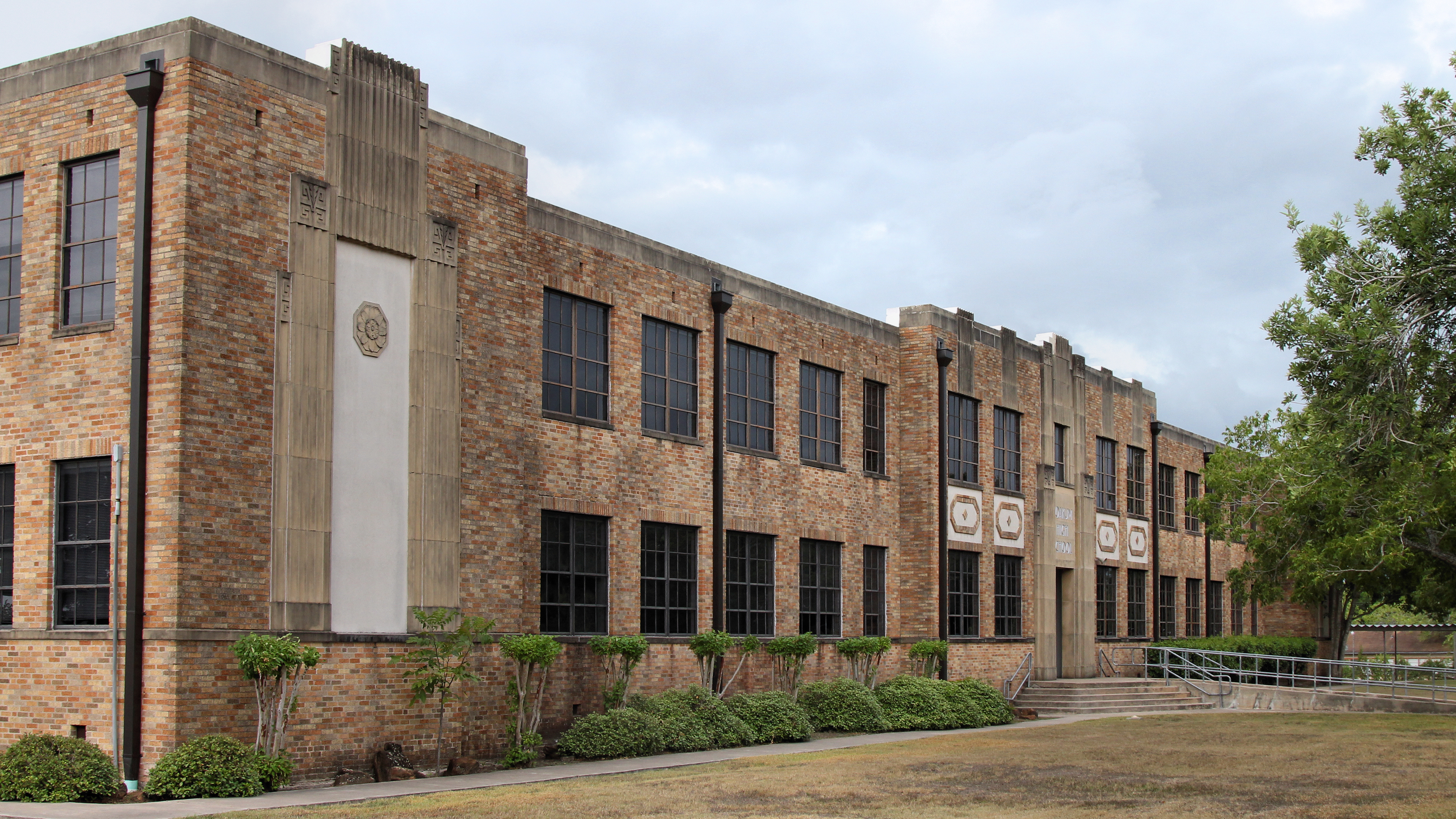
- Side view of building

Yoakum High School is a public high school located in Yoakum, Texas (USA) and classified as a 3A school by the UIL. It is part of the Yoakum Independent School District located in northeastern DeWitt County. High school students from the nearby Sweet Home Independent School District and St. Joseph Catholic School have the option to attend Yoakum High School. In 2015, the school was rated "Met Standard" by the Texas Education Agency.

== Athletics ==
The Yoakum Bulldogs compete in these sports -

Cross Country, Volleyball, Football, Basketball, Powerlifting, Golf, Tennis, Track, Soccer, Softball and Baseball

=== State Titles ===
- Boys Cross Country -
  - 1986(3A), 1996(3A)
- Boys Track
  - 2018 (3A)
- Football
  - 2025 (3A/D1)
- Girls Golf -
  - 1984(3A), 1990(3A), 1991(3A), 1992(3A), 1993(3A), 1995(3A), 1996(3A), 2004(3A)
- Girls Track -
  - 1988(3A)

=== State Finalist ===
Football 1952,2016,2025 (3AD1)
