= Vysehrad Independent School District =

School district in Texas, United States

Address
- 595 County Road 182 Hallettsville, Texas, 77964; United States

District information
- Schools: 1
- NCES District ID: 4844250

Students and staff
- Students: 88
- Teachers: 11.26 (on an FTE basis)
- Student–teacher ratio: 7.82:1

Other information
- Website: www.vysehrad.k12.tx.us

Vysehrad Independent School District is a public school district located in Lavaca County, Texas, United States.

Vysehrad ISD has one school that serves students in kindergarten through grade eight. High school students go to Hallettsville Independent School District.

Vysehrad ISD was rated as a "B" from the Texas Education Agency for the 2021-2022 school year.
