= Ezzell Independent School District =

School district in Texas, United States

Coordinates: 29.2806°N 96.8996°W

Ezzell ISD

Address
- 20500 FM 531 Hallettsville, Lavaca, Texas, 77964; United States

District information
- Motto: Creating Generations of Excellence
- Grades: PK–8
- NCES District ID: 4818890

Students and staff
- Enrollment: 130
- Teachers: 11.35 (on an FTE basis)
- Student–teacher ratio: 11.45:1
- District mascot: Mustangs
- Colors: red/white

Other information
- Website: www.ezzellisd.org

Ezzell Independent School District is a small public school district located in southern Lavaca County, Texas (USA). It is by Hallettsville. The school mascot is the "Mustangs". The school has 64 students enrolled as of the 2010–2011 school year.

The district received a "C" rating from the Texas Education Agency for the 2021-2022 academic year.

== Grades ==
The school serves grades PK through 8.

== Annual events ==
Each October the school hosts its annual "Fall Festival", which includes an auction, raffle, food stand, and game booths.

The school also holds a Christmas play every year.
