= Yoakum Independent School District =

School district in Texas, United States

Address
- 315 East Gonzales Street Yoakum, Texas, 77995; United States

District information
- Type: Public
- Grades: PK-12
- Schools: 5
- NCES District ID: 4846620

Students and staff
- Enrollment: 1,498
- Teachers: 138.92 (on an FTE basis)
- Student–teacher ratio: 10.78:1
- Athletic conference: UIL Class AAA
- District mascot: Bulldogs
- Colors: Blue, Black(being debated) & White

Other information
- Website: www.yoakumisd.net

°

Yoakum Independent School District is a public school district based in Yoakum, Texas (USA).

In 2011, the school district was rated "Academically Acceptable" by the Texas Education Agency.

== Schools ==
- Yoakum High School (grades 9-12)
- Yoakum Primary School (grades K-2)
- Yoakum Intermediate School (grades 3-5)
- Yoakum Junior High school (grades 6-8)

== The Bulldog Band ==
The band is a school group that consists of many talented students who play off at contests, concerts, and football games. In the past years, the marching band as made it to the state marching competition.
