= Lavaca County, Texas =

County in Texas, United States

- County
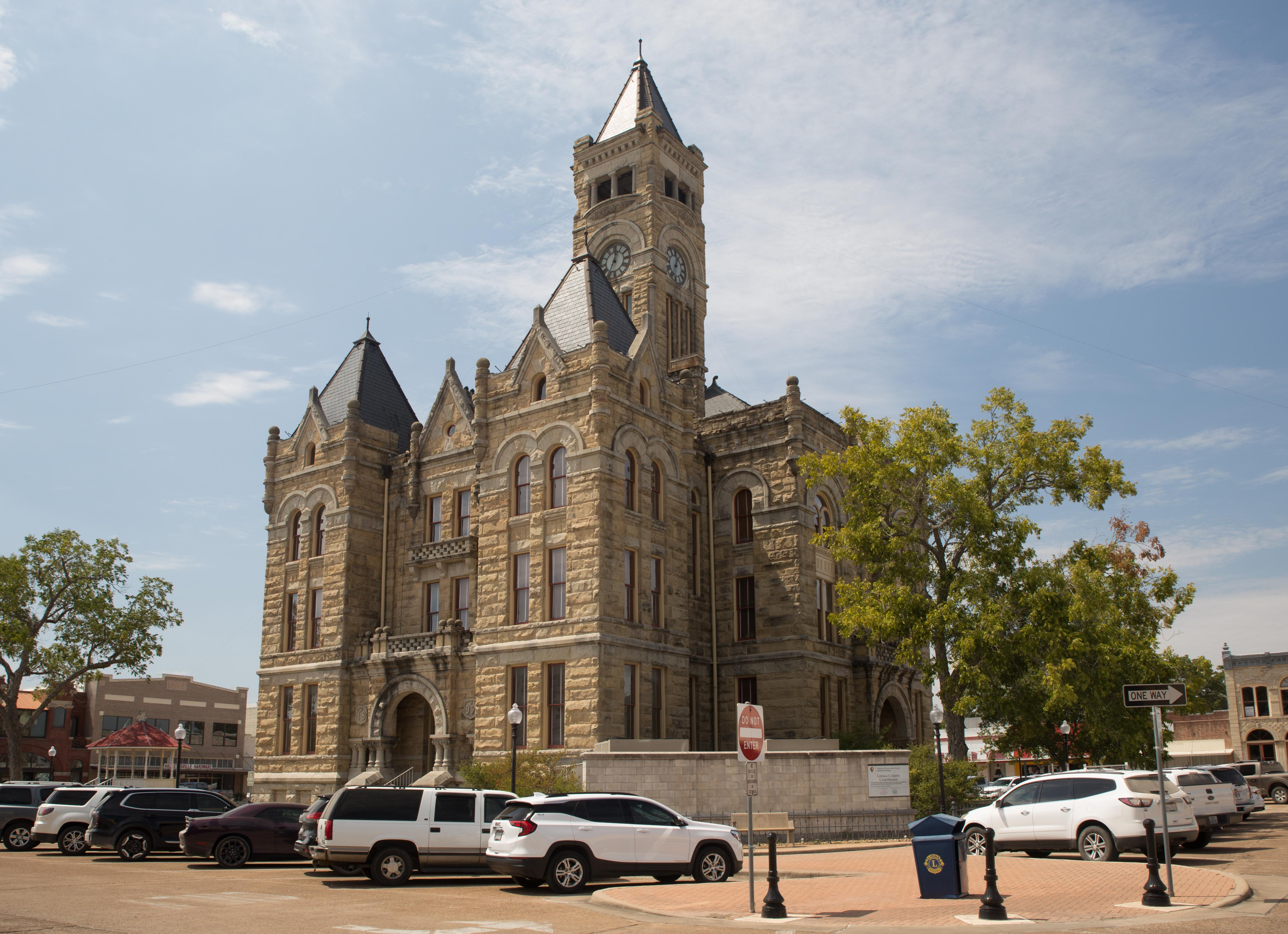
- The Lavaca County Courthouse in Hallettsville

- Location within the U.S. state of Texas
- Coordinates: 29°23′N 96°56′W
- Country: United States
- State: Texas
- Founded: 1846
- Named for: Lavaca River
- Seat: Hallettsville
- Largest city: Yoakum

Area
  - Total: 970 sq mi (2,500 km^{2})
  - Land: 970 sq mi (2,500 km^{2})
  - Water: 0.7 sq mi (1.8 km^{2}) 0.08%

Population (2020)
  - Total: 20,337
  - Estimate (2025): 20,651 ▲
  - Density: 21/sq mi (8.1/km^{2})
- Time zone: UTC−6 (Central)
  - Summer (DST): UTC−5 (CDT)
- Congressional district: 27th
- Website: www.co.lavaca.tx.us

Lavaca County (/ləˈvɑːkə/ lə-VAH-kə) is a county located in the U.S. state of Texas. As of the 2020 census, its population was 20,337. Its county seat is Hallettsville. The county was created in 1846. It is named for the Lavaca River, which curves its way southeast through Moulton and Hallettsville before reaching the coast at Matagorda Bay.

== Geography ==
According to the U.S. Census Bureau, the county has a total area of 970 square miles (2,500 km^{2}), of which 0.7 sq mi (1.8 km^{2}) (0.08%) is covered by water.

=== Major highways ===
- U.S. Highway 77
- U.S. Highway 77 Alternate
- U.S. Highway 90 Alternate
- State Highway 95
- State Highway 111

=== Adjacent counties ===
- Fayette County (north)
- Colorado County (northeast)
- Jackson County (southeast)
- Victoria County (south)
- DeWitt County (southwest)
- Gonzales County (northwest)

== Demographics ==
Historical population
Census	Pop.	Note	%±
1850	1,571		—
1860	5,945		278.4%
1870	9,168		54.2%
1880	13,641		48.8%
1890	21,887		60.5%
1900	28,121		28.5%
1910	26,418		−6.1%
1920	28,964		9.6%
1930	27,550		−4.9%
1940	25,485		−7.5%
1950	22,159		−13.1%
1960	20,174		−9.0%
1970	17,903		−11.3%
1980	19,004		6.1%
1990	18,690		−1.7%
2000	19,210		2.8%
2010	19,263		0.3%
2020	20,337		5.6%
2025 (est.)	20,651	▲	1.5%
U.S. Decennial Census; 1850–2010 2010 2020

=== Racial and ethnic composition ===
Lavaca County, Texas – Racial and ethnic composition Note: the US Census treats Hispanic/Latino as an ethnic category. This table excludes Latinos from the racial categories and assigns them to a separate category. Hispanics/Latinos may be of any race.
Race / Ethnicity (NH = Non-Hispanic)	Pop 1980	Pop 1990	Pop 2000	Pop 2010	Pop 2020	% 1980	% 1990	% 2000	% 2010	% 2020
White alone (NH)	16,156	15,716	15,579	14,674	14,564	85.01%	84.09%	81.10%	76.18%	71.61%
Black or African American alone (NH)	1,434	1,316	1,287	1,255	1,173	7.55%	7.04%	6.70%	6.52%	5.77%
Native American or Alaska Native alone (NH)	33	15	28	30	30	0.17%	0.08%	0.15%	0.16%	0.15%
Asian alone (NH)	34	14	26	56	74	0.18%	0.07%	0.14%	0.29%	0.36%
Native Hawaiian or Pacific Islander alone (NH)	x	x	3	17	5	x	x	0.02%	0.09%	0.02%
Other race alone (NH)	31	33	18	18	31	0.16%	0.18%	0.09%	0.09%	0.15%
Multiracial (NH)	x	x	86	136	524	x	x	0.45%	0.71%	2.58%
Hispanic or Latino (any race)	1,316	1,596	2,183	3,077	3,936	6.92%	8.54%	11.36%	15.97%	19.35%
Total	19,004	18,690	19,210	19,263	20,337	100.00%	100.00%	100.00%	100.00%	100.00%

=== 2020 census ===
As of the 2020 census, the county had a population of 20,337 and a median age of 44.7 years; 22.9% of the residents were under 18 and 24.3% were 65 or older. For every 100 females, there were 96.0 males; for every 100 females 18 and over, there were 93.9 males 18 and over.

The racial makeup of the county was 77.8% White, 6.1% Black or African American, 0.5% American Indian and Alaska Native, 0.4% Asian, <0.1% Native Hawaiian and other Pacific Islander, 5.7% from some other race, and 9.4% from two or more races. Hispanic or Latino residents of any race comprised 19.4% of the population.

About 17.6% of residents lived in urban areas, while 82.4% lived in rural areas.

Of the 8,191 households in the county, 29.6% had children under 18 living in them, 53.1% were married-couple households, 17.6% were households with a male householder and no spouse or partner present, and 24.7% were households with a female householder and no spouse or partner present. About 28.2% of all households were made up of individuals, and 15.3% had someone living alone who was 65 years of age or older.

The county had 10,456 housing units, of which 21.7% were vacant. Among occupied housing units, 76.9% were owner-occupied and 23.1% were renter-occupied. The homeowner vacancy rate was 1.8% and the rental vacancy rate was 11.3%.

=== 2000 census ===
As of the 2000 census, 19,210 people, 7,669 households, and 5,391 families were residing in the county. The population density was 20 people per square mile (7.7 people/km^{2}). The 9,657 housing units had an average density of 10 units per square mile (3.9 units/km^{2}). The racial makeup of the county was 86.86% White, 6.79% African American, 0.19% Native American, 0.16% Asian, 4.86% from other races, and 1.14% from two or more races. About 11.36% of the population were Hispanics or Latinos of any race. Of descent, 27.0% were of Czech, 24.1% German, 9.1% American, and 5.1% Irish ancestry according to Census 2000; 86.3% spoke English, 7.7% Spanish, 4.6% Czech and 1.2% German as their first language. In terms of ancestry in 2016, 32.8% were of German, 30.7% were of Czech, 10.8% were of Irish, 5.4% were of English, 3.4% were of American, and 2.2% were French.

Of the 7,669 households, 30.0% had children under 18 living with them, 57.7% were married couples living together, 9.3% had a female householder with no husband present, and 29.7% were not families. About 27.6% of all households were made up of individuals, and 16.6% had someone living alone who was 65 or older. The average household size was 2.44, and the average family size was 2.98.

In the county, the age distribution was 24.2% under 18, 6.9% from 18 to 24, 23.5% from 25 to 44, 23.6% from 45 to 64, and 21.8% who were 65 or older. The median age was 42 years. For every 100 females, there were 93.1 males. For every 100 females 18 and over, there were 88.5 males.

The median income for a household was $29,132 and for a family was $36,760. Males had a median income of $26,988 versus $17,537 for females. The per capita income for the county was $16,398. About 10.2% of families and 13.2% of the population were below the poverty line, including 15.2% of those under 18 and 18.4% of those 65 or over.

== Education ==
These K-12 school public school districts are located in Lavaca County:

- Ezzell Independent School District
- Hallettsville Independent School District (includes portions it covers for K-12, and portions in Vysehrad ISD that it covers only for secondary school)
- Moulton Independent School District
- Shiner Independent School District
- Sweet Home Independent School District
- Weimar Independent School District
- Yoakum Independent School District

Additionally, Vysehrad Independent School District is an elementary-only school district.

All of the county is in the service area of Victoria College.

== Communities ==
=== Cities ===
- Hallettsville (county seat)
- Shiner
- Yoakum (partly in DeWitt County)

=== Town ===
- Moulton

=== Unincorporated communities ===
- Breslau
- Sweet Home
- Speaks
- Sublime

== Politics ==
For all of its history, Lavaca County has had conservative roots and morals. It last voted for a Democrat in 1976 when Georgian Jimmy Carter was on the Democrat ticket. Each successive election since 1992, Lavaca County has continued to tilt more to the right.

All county level officials are Republicans.

United States presidential election results for Lavaca County, Texas
Year	Republican		Democratic		Third party(ies)	
Year	No.	%	No.	%	No.	%
1912	265	12.30%	1,455	67.52%	435	20.19%
1916	936	31.55%	1,784	60.13%	247	8.32%
1920	100	3.13%	1,249	39.10%	1,845	57.76%
1924	746	14.15%	3,290	62.42%	1,235	23.43%
1928	911	24.27%	2,842	75.73%	0	0.00%
1932	224	4.86%	4,378	94.91%	11	0.24%
1936	403	15.38%	2,204	84.12%	13	0.50%
1940	1,412	36.81%	2,419	63.06%	5	0.13%
1944	960	19.37%	3,406	68.74%	589	11.89%
1948	1,165	25.83%	3,046	67.52%	300	6.65%
1952	3,599	56.58%	2,750	43.23%	12	0.19%
1956	2,509	50.78%	2,412	48.82%	20	0.40%
1960	1,507	27.29%	4,002	72.47%	13	0.24%
1964	1,480	26.83%	4,031	73.07%	6	0.11%
1968	1,698	31.95%	2,165	40.74%	1,451	27.31%
1972	3,288	69.65%	1,429	30.27%	4	0.08%
1976	2,466	41.35%	3,458	57.98%	40	0.67%
1980	3,254	54.24%	2,678	44.64%	67	1.12%
1984	5,058	67.15%	2,464	32.71%	10	0.13%
1988	4,377	54.97%	3,531	44.35%	54	0.68%
1992	3,362	43.24%	2,700	34.72%	1,714	22.04%
1996	3,697	53.93%	2,575	37.56%	583	8.50%
2000	5,288	70.08%	2,171	28.77%	87	1.15%
2004	5,974	73.06%	2,152	26.32%	51	0.62%
2008	6,293	76.30%	1,869	22.66%	86	1.04%
2012	6,796	81.74%	1,428	17.18%	90	1.08%
2016	7,347	84.79%	1,170	13.50%	148	1.71%
2020	8,804	86.27%	1,333	13.06%	68	0.67%
2024	9,215	87.84%	1,235	11.77%	41	0.39%

United States Senate election results for Lavaca County, Texas1
Year	Republican		Democratic		Third party(ies)	
Year	No.	%	No.	%	No.	%
2024	8,915	85.56%	1,378	13.23%	126	1.21%

United States Senate election results for Lavaca County, Texas2
Year	Republican		Democratic		Third party(ies)	
Year	No.	%	No.	%	No.	%
2020	8,599	85.66%	1,305	13.00%	134	1.33%

Texas Gubernatorial election results for Lavaca County
Year	Republican		Democratic		Third party(ies)	
Year	No.	%	No.	%	No.	%
2022	7,380	89.90%	759	9.25%	70	0.85%

== See also ==
- List of museums in South Texas
- National Register of Historic Places listings in Lavaca County, Texas
- Recorded Texas Historic Landmarks in Lavaca County
