= Yoakum, Texas =

- City
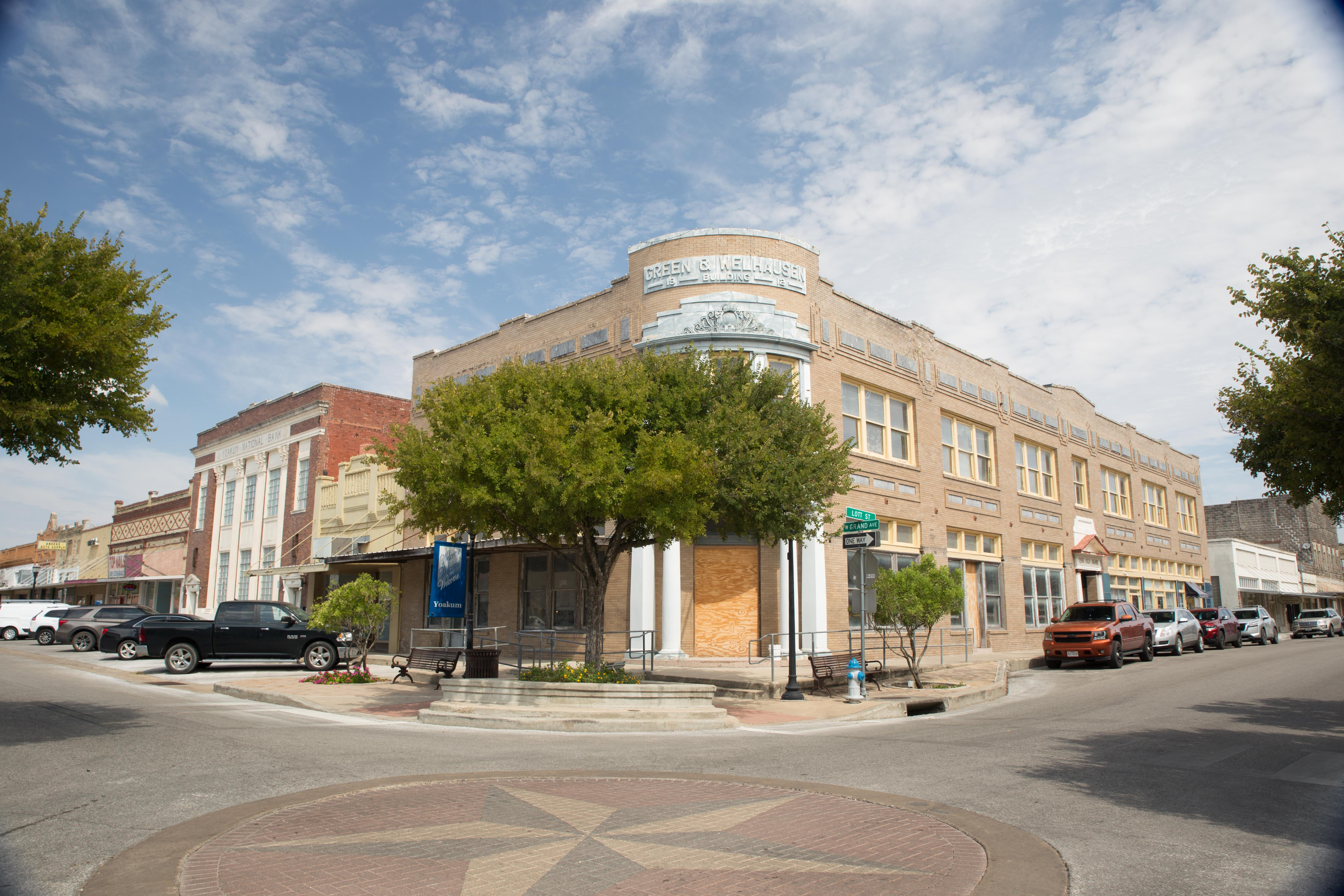
- Downtown Yoakum

- Seal
- Nicknames: Leather Capital of Texas, Hub City of South Texas
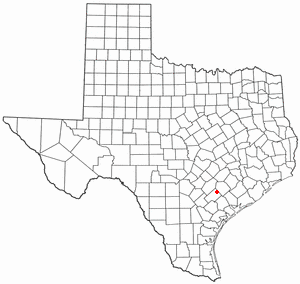
- Location of Yoakum, Texas

- Coordinates: 29°17′28″N 97°8′50″W
- Country: United States
- State: Texas
- Counties: Lavaca, DeWitt
- Incorporated: May 13, 1889

Government
  - Type: Council-Manager
  - City council: Mayor Carl O'Neill; Elorine Sitka; Rodney Jahn; Tim Faulkner
  - City manager: Kevin Coleman

Area
  - Total: 4.59 sq mi (11.89 km^{2})
  - Land: 4.58 sq mi (11.86 km^{2})
  - Water: 0.0077 sq mi (0.02 km^{2})
- Elevation: 365 ft (111.3 m)

Population (2020)
  - Total: 5,908
  - Density: 1,297/sq mi (500.7/km^{2})
  - Demonym: Yoakumite
- Time zone: UTC-6 (Central (CST))
  - Summer (DST): UTC-5 (CDT)
- ZIP code: 77995
- Area code: 361
- FIPS code: 48-80560
- GNIS feature ID: 1377671
- Website: www.cityofyoakum.org

Yoakum is a city in Lavaca and DeWitt counties in the U.S. state of Texas. The population was 5,908 at the 2020 census.

== History ==
The area was sparsely settled until a townsite was laid out with the construction of the San Antonio and Aransas Pass Railway in 1887, and named for Benjamin F. Yoakum, a vice president of the line. The railroad built a roundhouse and maintenance shops there, employing hundreds of workers. The town was incorporated in 1889. According to the Handbook of Texas Online, "By 1896 Yoakum had a cotton mill, three cotton gins, a compress, several churches, a bank, an ice factory, specialty and general stores, two weekly newspapers and one daily, a school system with 700 pupils, and a population of 3,000. By 1914 the number of residents had reached 7,500." In the early 20th century, the Tex-Tan company, later part of the Tandy Corporation, manufactured saddles, bridles, harnesses, belts, and wallets. Other industries included a dairy, a cannery, meat-packing and food-processing plants, and a metalworking shop. Beginning in 1926, tomato farming in the surrounding area became a major agricultural business, with Yoakum being known as "the tomato capital of south central Texas."

== Geography ==
Yoakum is located on the border of Lavaca and DeWitt counties at 29°17′28″N 97°8′50″W (29.291052, -97.147315). U.S. Route 77 Alternate forms the northwestern boundary of the city and leads northeast 17 miles (27 km) to Hallettsville and southwest 16 miles (26 km) to Cuero. Texas State Highway 111 passes through the center of Yoakum, leading southeast 39 miles (63 km) to Edna and west 9 miles (14 km) to Hochheim. Texas State Highway 95 leaves US 77A at the north end of Yoakum and leads north 8 miles (13 km) to Shiner.

According to the United States Census Bureau, Yoakum has a total area of 4.6 square miles (11.9 km^{2}), of which 0.01 square miles (0.02 km^{2}), or 0.20%, is covered by water.

== Demographics ==
Historical population
Census	Pop.	Note	%±
1890	1,745		—
1900	3,499		100.5%
1910	4,657		33.1%
1920	6,184		32.8%
1930	5,656		−8.5%
1940	4,733		−16.3%
1950	5,231		10.5%
1960	5,761		10.1%
1970	5,755		−0.1%
1980	6,148		6.8%
1990	5,611		−8.7%
2000	5,731		2.1%
2010	5,815		1.5%
2020	5,908		1.6%
U.S. Decennial Census

=== 2020 census ===
As of the 2020 census, Yoakum had a population of 5,908, 2,167 households, and 1,485 families. The median age was 36.2 years; 27.5% of residents were under the age of 18 and 17.8% of residents were 65 years of age or older. For every 100 females there were 95.5 males, and for every 100 females age 18 and over there were 88.4 males age 18 and over.

94.5% of residents lived in urban areas, while 5.5% lived in rural areas.

There were 2,167 households in Yoakum, of which 37.9% had children under the age of 18 living in them. Of all households, 40.1% were married-couple households, 21.1% were households with a male householder and no spouse or partner present, and 30.7% were households with a female householder and no spouse or partner present. About 28.0% of all households were made up of individuals and 13.2% had someone living alone who was 65 years of age or older.

There were 2,572 housing units, of which 15.7% were vacant. The homeowner vacancy rate was 2.8% and the rental vacancy rate was 12.8%.

Racial composition as of the 2020 census
Race	Number	Percent
White	3,160	53.5%
Black or African American	576	9.7%
American Indian and Alaska Native	77	1.3%
Asian	38	0.6%
Native Hawaiian and Other Pacific Islander	1	0.0%
Some other race	1,028	17.4%
Two or more races	1,028	17.4%
Hispanic or Latino (of any race)	3,097	52.4%

=== 2000 census ===
As of the census of 2000, 5,731 people, 2,156 households, and 1,515 families resided in the city. The population density was 1,256.2 inhabitants per square mile (485.0/km^{2}). The 2,529 housing units averaged 554.3 units per square mile (214.0 units/km^{2}).

The racial makeup of the city was 73.29% White, 11.88% African American, 0.38% Native American, 0.17% Asian, 0.05% Pacific Islander, 12.41% from other races, and 1.81% from two or more races. Hispanics or Latinos of any race were 33.89% of the population.

Of the 2,156 households, 35.7% had children under the age of 18 living with them, 49.3% were married couples living together, 15.7% had a female householder with no husband present, and 29.7% were not families. About 26.8% of all households were made up of individuals, and 15.0% had someone living alone who was 65 years of age or older. The average household size was 2.61 and the average family size was 3.15.

In the city, the population was distributed as 29.1% under the age of 18, 9.0% from 18 to 24, 24.8% from 25 to 44, 19.8% from 45 to 64, and 17.2% who were 65 years of age or older. The median age was 35 years. For every 100 females, there were 90.8 males. For every 100 females age 18 and over, there were 85.0 males.

The median income for a household in the city was $25,680, and for a family was $30,556. Males had a median income of $23,226 versus $15,594 for females. The per capita income for the city was $14,835. About 16.0% of families and 20.6% of the population were below the poverty line, including 28.4% of those under age 18 and 16.7% of those age 65 or over.

== Notable people ==
- Carl St. Clair, music director of the Pacific Symphony Orchestra
- Pappy Daily, country music producer
- Wayne Graham, Major League Baseball player and baseball coach at Rice University
- Charlie Hall, linebacker for Cleveland Browns and University of Houston
- Hubert Renfro Knickerbocker, Pulitzer Prize-winning journalist and author
- Obert Logan, former NFL safety for the Dallas Cowboys and the New Orleans Saints
- James Edwin Polk (1940–2024), jazz pianist, organist, arranger, bandleader, and educator who worked extensively with Ray Charles and became a central figure in the Austin jazz scene.
- Inez Beverly Prosser, pioneering educator and psychologist, first African-American female to receive a PhD in psychology
- Damion Ratley, wide receiver for the Cleveland Browns
- Ryan Wagner, relief pitcher for the Cincinnati Reds and the Washington Nationals
- David B. Hertz, operations research practitioner and academic, known for pioneering the use of Monte Carlo methods in finance

== Climate ==
The climate in this area is characterized by hot, humid summers and generally mild to cool winters. According to the Köppen climate classification, Yoakum has a humid subtropical climate, Cfa on climate maps.

Climate data for Yoakum, Texas
Month	Jan	Feb	Mar	Apr	May	Jun	Jul	Aug	Sep	Oct	Nov	Dec	Year
Mean daily maximum °F (°C)	63.0 (17.2)	67.0 (19.4)	74.0 (23.3)	80.0 (26.7)	86.0 (30.0)	92.0 (33.3)	95.0 (35.0)	96.0 (35.6)	91.0 (32.8)	83.0 (28.3)	73.0 (22.8)	65.0 (18.3)	80.4 (26.9)
Mean daily minimum °F (°C)	40.0 (4.4)	44.0 (6.7)	51.0 (10.6)	58.0 (14.4)	66.0 (18.9)	71.0 (21.7)	73.0 (22.8)	72.0 (22.2)	68.0 (20.0)	59.0 (15.0)	50.0 (10.0)	43.0 (6.1)	57.9 (14.4)
Average precipitation inches (mm)	2.7 (69)	2.0 (51)	2.8 (71)	3.5 (89)	4.4 (110)	4.0 (100)	2.8 (71)	3.8 (97)	3.9 (99)	4.3 (110)	3.0 (76)	2.5 (64)	39.7 (1,007)
Average precipitation days	5	5	5	4	5	5	5	5	6	5	5	5	60
Source: NOAA

== Media and journalism ==
- Yoakum Herald-Times, area newspaper
