= Hallettsville, Texas =

- City
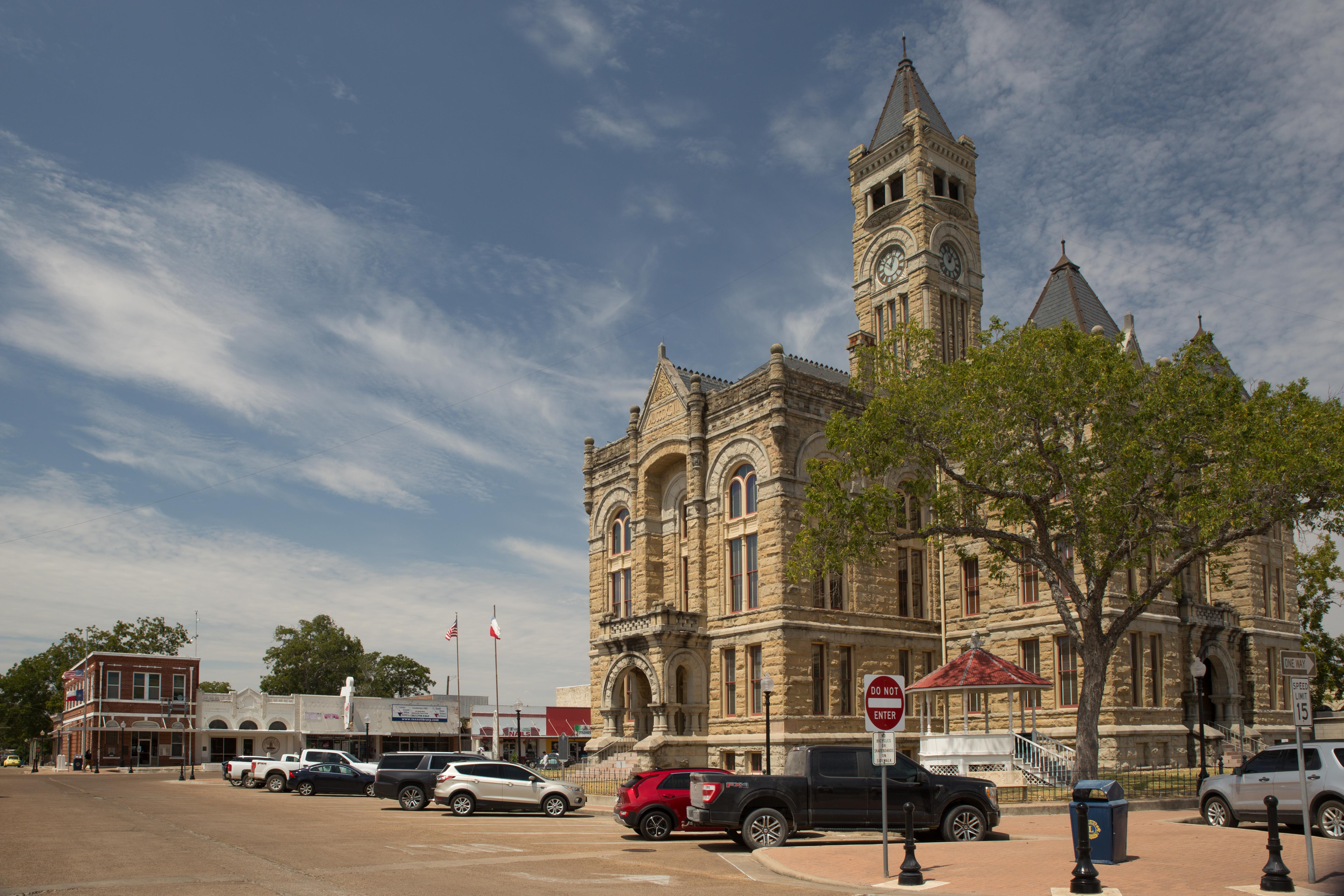
- Lavaca County Courthouse
- Motto: "The Best Time in Texas"
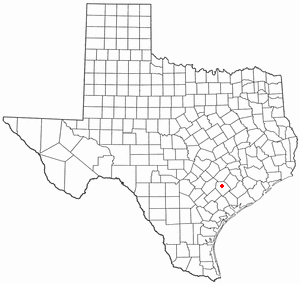
- Location of Hallettsville, Texas

- Coordinates: 29°26′43″N 96°56′27″W
- Country: United States
- State: Texas
- County: Lavaca
- Established: 1831

Government
  - Mayor: Alice Jo Summers

Area
  - Total: 2.73 sq mi (7.08 km^{2})
  - Land: 2.73 sq mi (7.08 km^{2})
  - Water: 0 sq mi (0.00 km^{2})
- Elevation: 233 ft (71 m)

Population (2020)
  - Total: 2,731
  - Density: 964.2/sq mi (372.28/km^{2})
- Time zone: UTC-6 (Central (CST))
  - Summer (DST): UTC-5 (CDT)
- ZIP code: 77964
- Area code: 361
- FIPS code: 48-31868
- GNIS feature ID: 1337258
- Website: www.cityofhallettsville.org

Hallettsville is a city in Lavaca County, Texas, United States. Its population was 2,731 at the 2020 census. It is the county seat of Lavaca County. Hallettsville also has a sizable German-Texan population, as the town founders were mainly German and Czech immigrants.

== History ==
Hallettsville is named after an early founding family that colonized this area. John Hallett had received a land grant from Stephen F. Austin in 1831, and after his death in 1836, his wife, Margaret Hallett, donated the land for the town's location.

A few of the early settlers of the Hallettsville area include Collatinus Ballard, M. B. Bennett, A. W. Hicks, David Ives, Ira McDaniel, and William Smeathers.

== Geography ==
According to the United States Census Bureau, the city has a total area of 2.2 square miles (5.7 km^{2}), all land. It is also located midway between the major cities of Houston and San Antonio.

=== Climate ===
The climate in this area is characterized by hot, humid summers and generally mild to cool winters. According to the Köppen climate classification, Hallettsville has a humid subtropical climate, Cfa on climate maps.

Climate data for Hallettsville, Texas (1991–2020 normals, extremes 1893–present)
Month	Jan	Feb	Mar	Apr	May	Jun	Jul	Aug	Sep	Oct	Nov	Dec	Year
Record high °F (°C)	90 (32)	92 (33)	98 (37)	99 (37)	102 (39)	109 (43)	111 (44)	111 (44)	110 (43)	102 (39)	96 (36)	88 (31)	111 (44)
Mean maximum °F (°C)	79.1 (26.2)	82.2 (27.9)	85.8 (29.9)	89.5 (31.9)	93.3 (34.1)	97.4 (36.3)	99.8 (37.7)	101.3 (38.5)	98.3 (36.8)	93.0 (33.9)	85.7 (29.8)	80.6 (27.0)	102.7 (39.3)
Mean daily maximum °F (°C)	65.9 (18.8)	69.4 (20.8)	75.6 (24.2)	81.8 (27.7)	88.2 (31.2)	93.6 (34.2)	96.2 (35.7)	97.5 (36.4)	92.4 (33.6)	85.1 (29.5)	74.6 (23.7)	67.1 (19.5)	82.3 (27.9)
Daily mean °F (°C)	55.3 (12.9)	59.0 (15.0)	65.2 (18.4)	71.4 (21.9)	78.4 (25.8)	83.6 (28.7)	85.8 (29.9)	86.3 (30.2)	81.7 (27.6)	73.6 (23.1)	63.6 (17.6)	56.6 (13.7)	71.7 (22.1)
Mean daily minimum °F (°C)	44.6 (7.0)	48.6 (9.2)	54.9 (12.7)	60.9 (16.1)	68.6 (20.3)	73.8 (23.2)	75.4 (24.1)	75.1 (23.9)	71.0 (21.7)	62.2 (16.8)	52.7 (11.5)	46.0 (7.8)	61.2 (16.2)
Mean minimum °F (°C)	25.9 (−3.4)	29.3 (−1.5)	33.9 (1.1)	41.0 (5.0)	52.5 (11.4)	65.1 (18.4)	69.8 (21.0)	68.7 (20.4)	57.0 (13.9)	42.1 (5.6)	32.9 (0.5)	27.5 (−2.5)	23.2 (−4.9)
Record low °F (°C)	6 (−14)	5 (−15)	18 (−8)	29 (−2)	38 (3)	52 (11)	56 (13)	58 (14)	41 (5)	27 (−3)	17 (−8)	5 (−15)	5 (−15)
Average precipitation inches (mm)	3.06 (78)	2.30 (58)	2.99 (76)	3.51 (89)	4.40 (112)	4.54 (115)	2.50 (64)	3.18 (81)	3.67 (93)	4.28 (109)	3.25 (83)	2.74 (70)	40.42 (1,028)
Average snowfall inches (cm)	0.0 (0.0)	0.0 (0.0)	0.0 (0.0)	0.0 (0.0)	0.0 (0.0)	0.0 (0.0)	0.0 (0.0)	0.0 (0.0)	0.0 (0.0)	0.0 (0.0)	0.0 (0.0)	0.1 (0.25)	0.1 (0.25)
Average precipitation days (≥ 0.1 in)	9.4	8.8	8.9	7.3	7.2	7.9	6.6	6.5	8.4	6.5	7.0	9.6	94.1
Average snowy days (≥ 0.1 in)	0.0	0.0	0.0	0.0	0.0	0.0	0.0	0.0	0.0	0.0	0.0	0.0	0
Source: NOAA

== Demographics ==
Historical population
Census	Pop.	Note	%±
1870	43		—
1880	588		1,267.4%
1890	1,011		71.9%
1900	1,457		44.1%
1910	1,379		−5.4%
1930	1,406		—
1940	1,581		12.4%
1950	2,000		26.5%
1960	2,808		40.4%
1970	2,712		−3.4%
1980	2,865		5.6%
1990	2,718		−5.1%
2000	2,345		−13.7%
2010	2,550		8.7%
2020	2,731		7.1%
U.S. Decennial Census

=== 2020 census ===
As of the 2020 census, 2,731 people, 1,092 households, and 551 families resided in the city, and the median age was 40.8 years. 24.2% of residents were under the age of 18 and 23.3% of residents were 65 years of age or older. For every 100 females there were 90.4 males, and for every 100 females age 18 and over there were 86.2 males age 18 and over. 0.0% of residents lived in urban areas, while 100.0% lived in rural areas.

There were 1,092 households in Hallettsville, of which 33.7% had children under the age of 18 living in them. Of all households, 41.5% were married-couple households, 17.9% were households with a male householder and no spouse or partner present, and 36.4% were households with a female householder and no spouse or partner present. About 34.8% of all households were made up of individuals and 16.9% had someone living alone who was 65 years of age or older.

There were 1,264 housing units, of which 13.6% were vacant. The homeowner vacancy rate was 1.8% and the rental vacancy rate was 4.1%.

Racial composition as of the 2020 census
Race	Number	Percent
White	1,843	67.5%
Black or African American	447	16.4%
American Indian and Alaska Native	4	0.1%
Asian	30	1.1%
Native Hawaiian and Other Pacific Islander	0	0.0%
Some other race	118	4.3%
Two or more races	289	10.6%
Hispanic or Latino (of any race)	517	18.9%

=== 2000 census ===
As of the census of 2000, 2,345 people, 1,019 households, and 627 families resided in the city. The population density was 1,051.0 inhabitants per square mile (405.8/km^{2}). The 1,223 housing units had an average density of 548.1 per square mile (211.6/km^{2}). The racial makeup of the city was 77.10% White, 16.46% Black, 0.17% Native American, 0.17% Asian, 4.48% from other races, and 1.62% from two or more races. Hispanics or Latinos of any race were 11.17% of the population.

Of the 1,019 households, 29.9% had children under 18 living with them, 44.0% were married couples living together, 14.6% had a female householder with no husband present, and 38.4% were not families. About 35.6% of all households were made up of individuals, and 21.3% had someone living alone who was 65 or older. The average household size was 2.29 and the average family size was 3.00.

In the city, the population was spread out, with 25.2% under the age of 18, 8.5% from 18 to 24, 23.4% from 25 to 44, 22.4% from 45 to 64, and 20.5% who were 65 years of age or older. The median age was 40 years. For every 100 females, there were 83.1 males. For every 100 females age 18 and over, there were 78.3 males.

The median income for a household in the city was $25,089, and for a family was $38,080. Males had a median income of $31,250 versus $20,365 for females. The per capita income for the city was $14,811. About 16.4% of families and 17.4% of the population were below the poverty line, including 21.0% of those under 18 and 14.5% of those 65 or over.

== Arts and culture ==
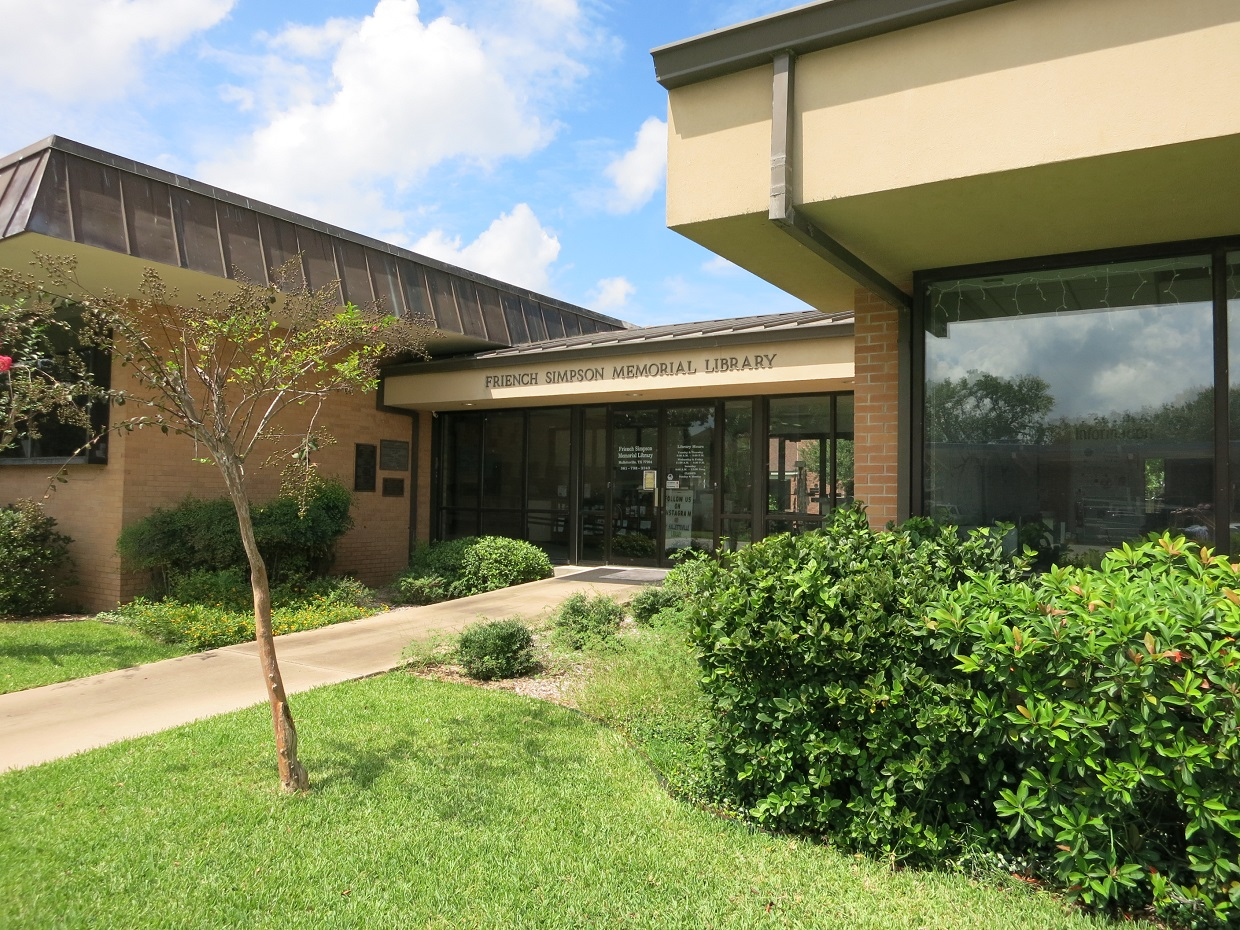
Friench Simpson Memorial Library

Hallettsville is a center of the traditional domino game Texas 42. It is home to the Texas Championship Domino Hall of Fame and hosts a State-Championship Straight Domino tournament every year in January, and a Texas State-Championship 42 Domino tournament in March.

Hallettsville hosts multiple Halls of Fame including the Central Texas Semipro Baseball Hall of Fame, Texas Fiddlers Hall of Fame and the Texas State Championship High School Rodeo Hall of Fame.

Texas State Championship Fiddler's Frolics is a three day event on the fourth weekend in April with fiddlers from all over Texas competing for the title of Texas State Champion Fiddler. It also hosts the annual Kolache Fest the last weekend in September

Hallettsville is the founding home of the Texas and National High School Rodeo with one of the founders Alton Allen inventing the present Calf Roping Barrier, also known as “The Hallettsville Barrier”.

The Friench Simpson Memorial Library has served the residents of Hallettsville and Lavaca County for over 70 years. The modern library houses over 20,000 volumes and is a major source of local history and genealogy research for the area. Public-access computers with Internet connections are available for use at the library.

== Education ==
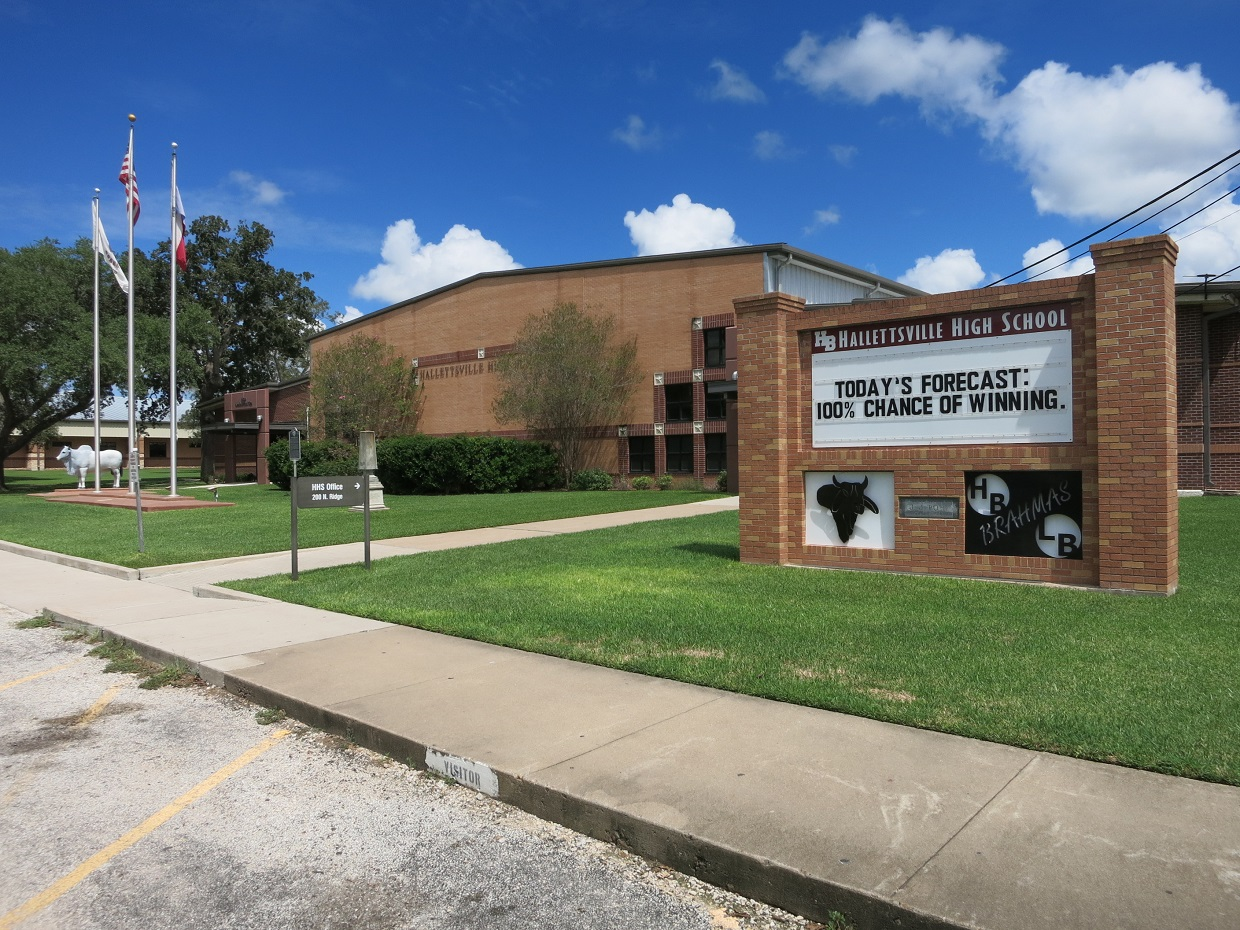
Hallettsville High School

Public education in the city of Hallettsville is provided by the Hallettsville Independent School District. Sacred Heart Catholic School, a private prekindergarten–grade 12 campus, is also located in the city.

== Media ==
- Hallettsville Tribune-Herald

== Notable people ==
- Logan Ondrusek, Major League Baseball pitcher
- Andy Rice, American college and professional football player
- Cole Wick, American college and professional football player
- Jonathan Brooks, Professional Football Player for the Carolina Panthers graduated from Halletsville High School
- Joseph S. Stiborik, radar operator on the Enola Gay, the B-29 that dropped the first atomic bomb on Hiroshima on Aug. 6, 1945

== In popular culture ==
Although the actual town involved in the real story of the "Chicken Ranch" is located a few miles north of Hallettsville on Highway 77, film makers chose the town's historic Lavaca County Courthouse square to serve as backdrop for the city scenes in The Best Little Whorehouse in Texas, the 1982 musical starring Burt Reynolds and Dolly Parton.

Hallettsville is also the featured location in the 2009 horror film titled Hallettsville, which stars Gary Busey and Derek Lee Nixon.

The town is mentioned in the Robert Earl Keen song "Armadillo Jackel" as the place where they pay $2.50 for dead armadillos.

Ripley's Believe It or Not! once called Hallettsville the "13 City" because in 1913 it had 13 letters in the name, a population of 1300, 13 churches, 13 newspapers, and even 13 saloons.

The town is also visited by Antoine de Maximy for the French TV show J'irais dormir chez vous (in English I'll Come Sleep in Your House), during his journey in the United States.
