= National Register of Historic Places listings in the Alamo region of Texas: Other =

This page is one of three listing out the National Register of Historic Places listings in the Alamo region of Texas.

The Alamo region is an area of 19 counties defined by the Texas Comptroller for economic reporting in 2022, as mapped here. The region included 2020 population of almost 2.9 million, or 9.8 percent of Texas' population, with the San Antonio-New Braunfels MSA having 89 percent of the Alamo region's population and Bexar alone having 70 percent.

This page includes all counties besides Bexar County (which includes San Antonio) and Victoria County.

To see all locations together in a map, click on "Map all coordinates using OpenSourceMap" at right.

== Atascosa County ==
	Name on the Register	Image	Date listed	Location	City or town	Description
1	Atascosa County Courthouse	Atascosa County Courthouse	December 30, 1997 (#97001598)	Circle Dr. 28°55′11″N 98°32′46″W	Jourdanton	State Antiquities Landmark; Mission Revival style completed in 1912
2	Korus Farmstead	Korus Farmstead	July 15, 1998 (#98000876)	US-281 at Farm-to-Market Rd. 536; 29°06′59″N 98°29′07″W	Leming	
3	Frederick and Sallie Lyons House	Frederick and Sallie Lyons House	February 20, 2001 (#01000061)	801 Live Oak St. 28°58′00″N 98°29′13″W	Pleasanton	Modified L-plan building constructed between 1912 and 1913.

== Bandera County ==
	Name on the Register	Image	Date listed	Location	City or town	Description
1	Bandera County Courthouse and Jail	Bandera County Courthouse and Jail	October 31, 1979 (#79002911)	Public Sq., 12th and Maple Sts. 29°43′36″N 99°04′21″W	Bandera	State Antiquities Landmark, Recorded Texas Historic Landmarks
2	Jureczki House	Jureczki House	January 11, 1980 (#80004075)	607 Cypress St. 29°43′13″N 99°04′31″W	Bandera	Recorded Texas Historic Landmark
3	B.F. Langford Jr. and Mary Hay House	B.F. Langford Jr. and Mary Hay House	March 22, 2004 (#04000229)	415 Fourteenth St. 29°43′41″N 99°04′12″W	Bandera	Recorded Texas Historic Landmark
4	River Oaks Courts	River Oaks Courts	January 28, 2019 (#100003354)	14349 TX 16; 29°48′07″N 99°15′13″W	Medina	Recorded Texas Historic Landmark

== Calhoun County ==
	Name on the Register	Image	Date listed	Location	City or town	Description
1	La Salle Monument	La Salle Monument	July 27, 2018 (#100002757)	TX 316 at Blind Bayou; 28°31′38″N 96°30′31″W	Indianola	
2	Matagorda Island Lighthouse	Matagorda Island Lighthouse	September 18, 1984 (#84001624)	Matagorda Island; 28°20′16″N 96°25′27″W	Port O'Connor	

== Former listings ==
	Name on the Register	Image	Date listed	Date removed	Location	City or town	Description
1	A. C. Louwien Bakery		August 9, 1984 (#84001617)	December 3, 1992	223 Main Street; 28°36′57″N 96°37′30″W	Port Lavaca	

== Comal County ==
	Name on the Register	Image	Date listed	Location	City or town	Description
1	Anhalt Hall	Anhalt Hall	July 23, 2018 (#100002697)	2390 Anhalt Rd. 29°48′50″N 98°28′44″W	Spring Branch	
2	Arnold-Rauch-Brandt Homestead	Arnold-Rauch-Brandt Homestead	July 23, 2018 (#100002698)	TX 46 W, Parcel 393224; 29°43′43″N 98°12′51″W	New Braunfels	
3	Brauntex Theater	Brauntex Theater	March 24, 2008 (#08000240)	290 W. San Antonio; 29°42′05″N 98°07′35″W	New Braunfels	
4	Andreas Breustedt House	Andreas Breustedt House	July 22, 1982 (#82004497)	1370 Church Hill Dr. 29°42′33″N 98°05′47″W	New Braunfels	Recorded Texas Historic Landmark
5	Central Fire Station	Central Fire Station	December 3, 2019 (#100004753)	169 Hill Ave. 29°42′02″N 98°07′33″W	New Braunfels	
6	Comal County Courthouse	Comal County Courthouse	December 12, 1976 (#76002017)	N. Sequin Ave. 29°42′12″N 98°07′29″W	New Braunfels	State Antiquities Landmark, Recorded Texas Historic Landmark
7	Comal Hotel and Klein-Kuse House	Comal Hotel and Klein-Kuse House	June 26, 1986 (#86001373)	295 E. San Antonio and 165 Market St. 29°42′17″N 98°07′25″W	New Braunfels	Recorded Texas Historic Landmarks
8	Comal Power Plant	Comal Power Plant	August 20, 2004 (#04000895)	Jct. of Landa Rd. and Landa Park Dr. 29°42′23″N 98°07′57″W	New Braunfels	
9	Comal Springs	Comal Springs	May 30, 2019 (#100003970)	Address Restricted	New Braunfels	
10	Faust Street Bridge	Faust Street Bridge	March 17, 2009 (#09000138)	Connecting Faust and Porter Streets at the Guadalupe River; 29°41′48″N 98°06′25″W	New Braunfels	Recorded Texas Historic Landmark, Historic Bridges of Texas MPS
11	Faust-Frueholz House and Medical Building		August 29, 2024 (#100010760)	305 South Seguin Avenue; 29°42′05″N 98°07′18″W	New Braunfels	
12	First Protestant Church	First Protestant Church	July 14, 1971 (#71000926)	296 S. Seguin St. 29°42′03″N 98°07′21″W	New Braunfels	Recorded Texas Historic Landmark
13	Fischer Historic District	Fischer Historic District	June 19, 2017 (#100001222)	Roughly bounded by Fischer Store Rd., FM 32, Patriotic & Let's Roll Drs. 29°58′43″N 98°15′53″W	Fischer	Includes Recorded Texas Historic Landmark
14	Carl W. A. Groos House	Carl W. A. Groos House	August 17, 2000 (#00000884)	228 S. Seguin St. 29°42′05″N 98°07′22″W	New Braunfels	Recorded Texas Historic Landmark
15	Gruene Historic District	Gruene Historic District	April 21, 1975 (#75001962)	Both sides of Seguin, New Braunfels, and Austin Sts. 29°44′20″N 98°06′12″W	Gruene	Includes Recorded Texas Historic Landmarks
16	Guadalupe Hotel	Guadalupe Hotel	March 13, 1975 (#75001963)	471 Main Plaza; 29°42′11″N 98°07′31″W	New Braunfels	Recorded Texas Historic Landmark
17	Holz-Forshage-Krueger Building	Holz-Forshage-Krueger Building	April 17, 1997 (#97000362)	472 W. San Antonio St. 29°41′58″N 98°07′40″W	New Braunfels	
18	Honey Creek Historic District		March 26, 2018 (#100002267)	Along State Park 31 & Bell Ranch Rd., Parcels 77128, 82609, 73632, 77109, 77257, 80607, 81637, 149474; 29°50′20″N 98°30′50″W	Honey Creek	
19	Hotel Faust	Hotel Faust	May 2, 1985 (#85000922)	240 S. Seguin St. 29°42′05″N 98°07′22″W	New Braunfels	Recorded Texas Historic Landmark
20	Kabelmacher House		May 8, 2019 (#100003922)	23968 TX 46; 29°47′43″N 98°28′34″W	Spring Branch vicinity	
21	Kappelmann-Mayer Ranch		February 10, 2020 (#100004965)	4738 FM 1863; 29°44′46″N 98°23′46″W	Bulverde	
22	Stephen Klein House	Stephen Klein House	August 25, 1970 (#70000743)	161 S. Seguin St. 29°42′09″N 98°07′25″W	New Braunfels	Recorded Texas Historic Landmark
23	Lindheimer House	Lindheimer House	August 25, 1970 (#70000744)	489 Comal Ave. 29°42′02″N 98°07′07″W	New Braunfels	Recorded Texas Historic Landmark
24	Main Plaza	Main Plaza	October 12, 2021 (#100007074)	Main Plaza; 29°42′11″N 98°07′29″W	New Braunfels	
25	Mission Valley School and Teacherage		September 4, 2020 (#100005536)	1135 Mission Valley Rd. 29°43′12″N 98°12′18″W	New Braunfels	
26	Natural Bridge Caverns Sinkhole Site	Natural Bridge Caverns Sinkhole Site	October 29, 2004 (#04001202)	Address restricted	Garden Ridge	Located within Natural Bridge Caverns National Natural Landmark
27	Pape-Borchers Homestead		September 4, 2020 (#100005537)	142 Hueco Springs Loop Rd. 29°43′57″N 98°11′34″W	New Braunfels	
28	Riley's Tavern	Riley's Tavern	April 23, 2018 (#100002346)	8894 FM 1102; 29°48′23″N 98°01′25″W	New Braunfels	
29	Saint Joseph's Chapel	Saint Joseph's Chapel	August 1, 2014 (#14000472)	6400 FM 482; 29°38′50″N 98°13′08″W	Schertz	
30	Walzem Homestead		February 2, 2018 (#100002086)	690 Mission Valley Rd. 29°43′26″N 98°11′49″W	New Braunfels	

== Dewitt County ==
	Name on the Register	Image	Date listed	Location	City or town	Description
1	Bates-Sheppard House	Bates-Sheppard House	October 31, 1988 (#88001948)	312 E. Broadway; 29°05′33″N 97°17′11″W	Cuero	Recorded Texas Historic Landmark
2	John Y. Bell House	John Y. Bell House	October 31, 1988 (#88001982)	304 E. Prairie; 29°05′46″N 97°17′07″W	Cuero	
3	M. D. Bennett House	M. D. Bennett House	October 31, 1988 (#88001963)	208 N. Hunt; 29°05′24″N 97°17′12″W	Cuero	
4	Billow-Thompson House	Billow-Thompson House	October 31, 1988 (#88001949)	402 E. Broadway; 29°05′32″N 97°17′09″W	Cuero	
5	Breeden-Runge Wholesale Grocery Company Building	Breeden-Runge Wholesale Grocery Company Building	October 31, 1988 (#88001957)	108 N. Frederick William; 29°05′32″N 97°17′43″W	Cuero	
6	Floyd Buchel House	Floyd Buchel House	October 31, 1988 (#88001950)	407 E. Broadway; 29°05′29″N 97°17′09″W	Cuero	
7	Arthur Burns House	Arthur Burns House	October 31, 1988 (#88001987)	130 E. Sarah; 29°05′44″N 97°17′14″W	Cuero	
8	John W. Burns House	John W. Burns House	October 31, 1988 (#88001947)	311 E. Broadway; 29°05′31″N 97°17′13″W	Cuero	
9	Callaway-Gillette House	Callaway-Gillette House	October 31, 1988 (#88001989)	306 E. Sarah; 29°05′42″N 97°17′07″W	Cuero	
10	J. B. Chaddock House	J. B. Chaddock House	October 31, 1988 (#88001995)	202 S. Valley; 29°05′10″N 97°17′06″W	Cuero	
11	City Water Works	City Water Works	October 31, 1988 (#88001956)	208 S. Esplanade; 29°05′21″N 97°17′33″W	Cuero	
12	Clement-Nagel House	Clement-Nagel House	October 31, 1988 (#88001974)	701 E. Morgan; 29°05′07″N 97°17′10″W	Cuero	
13	Colston-Gohmert House	Colston-Gohmert House	October 31, 1988 (#88001983)	309 E. Prairie; 29°05′44″N 97°17′06″W	Cuero	
14	Charles Cook House		October 31, 1988 (#88001986)	103 E. Sarah; 29°05′44″N 97°17′17″W	Cuero	Demolished
15	W. H. Crain House	W. H. Crain House	October 31, 1988 (#88001953)	508 E. Courthouse; 29°05′25″N 97°17′08″W	Cuero	
16	Cuero Commercial Historic District	Cuero Commercial Historic District	November 17, 1988 (#88001996)	Roughly bounded by Gonzales, Main, Terrell and Courthouse; 29°05′28″N 97°17′27″W	Cuero	Includes Recorded Texas Historic Landmark
17	Cuero Gin		October 31, 1988 (#88001970)	501 W. Main; 29°05′30″N 97°17′44″W	Cuero	Demolished by 2005
18	Cuero High School	Cuero High School	October 31, 1988 (#88001990)	405 E. Sarah; 29°05′55″N 97°17′04″W	Cuero	
19	Cuero Hydroelectric Plant		September 19, 1977 (#77001514)	2 mi (3.2 km). N of Cuero on Guadalupe Plant; 29°07′46″N 97°18′40″W	Cuero	
20	Cuero I Archeological District	Cuero I Archeological District	October 9, 1974 (#74002271)	Address restricted	Cuero	Extends into Gonzales County
21	E. A. Daule House		October 31, 1988 (#88001981)	201 W. Newman; 29°05′23″N 97°17′52″W	Cuero	
22	DeWitt County Courthouse	DeWitt County Courthouse	May 6, 1971 (#71000929)	Bounded by N. Gonzales, E. Live Oak, N. Clinton, and E. Courthouse Sts. 29°05′29″N 97°17′19″W	Cuero	State Antiquities Landmark, Recorded Texas Historic Landmark
23	DeWitt County Monument	DeWitt County Monument	March 6, 2019 (#100003421)	US 87 & Courthouse St. 29°05′17″N 97°16′34″W	Cuero	
24	East Main Street Residential Historic District	East Main Street Residential Historic District	October 31, 1988 (#88001998)	400 to 800 blocks of E. Main St. 29°05′16″N 97°17′07″W	Cuero	
25	Eckhardt Stores	Eckhardt Stores	June 29, 1976 (#76002020)	Eckhardt and Main St. 28°58′49″N 97°30′13″W	Yorktown	Recorded Texas Historic Landmark
26	William and L. F. Eichholz House	William and L. F. Eichholz House	October 31, 1988 (#88001954)	308 W. Courthouse; 29°05′37″N 97°17′39″W	Cuero	
27	English-German School	English-German School	October 31, 1988 (#88001978)	201 E. Newman; 29°05′09″N 97°17′30″W	Cuero	Recorded Texas Historic Landmark; building is condemned
28	J. B. Farris House		October 31, 1988 (#88001960)	502 N. Gonzales; 29°05′36″N 97°17′18″W	Cuero	Demolished
29	First Methodist Church	First Methodist Church	October 31, 1988 (#88001952)	301 E. Courthouse; 29°05′27″N 97°17′17″W	Cuero	
30	Alfred Friar House	Alfred Friar House	October 31, 1988 (#88001961)	703 N. Gonzales; 29°05′42″N 97°17′13″W	Cuero	
31	William Frobese Sr. House	William Frobese Sr. House	October 31, 1988 (#88001980)	305 E. Newman; 29°05′07″N 97°17′24″W	Cuero	Recorded Texas Historic Landmark
32	Grace Episcopal Church	Grace Episcopal Church	October 31, 1988 (#88001955)	401 N. Esplanade; 29°05′33″N 97°17′23″W	Cuero	Recorded Texas Historic Landmark
33	House at 1002 Stockdale	House at 1002 Stockdale	October 31, 1988 (#88001993)	1002 Stockdale; 29°04′47″N 97°17′37″W	Cuero	
34	House at 404 Stockdale	House at 404 Stockdale	October 31, 1988 (#88001992)	404 Stockdale; 29°05′07″N 97°17′27″W	Cuero	
35	House at 609 East Live Oak	House at 609 East Live Oak	October 31, 1988 (#88001968)	609 E. Live Oak; 29°05′24″N 97°17′02″W	Cuero	
36	Keller-Grunder House	Keller-Grunder House	October 31, 1988 (#88001973)	409 E. Morgan; 29°05′11″N 97°17′19″W	Cuero	Recorded Texas Historic Landmark
37	Albert and Kate Leinhardt House	Albert and Kate Leinhardt House	October 31, 1988 (#88001976)	818 E. Morgan; 29°05′11″N 97°17′01″W	Cuero	
38	Emil Leonardt House	Emil Leonardt House	November 4, 1988 (#88001975)	804 E. Morgan; 29°05′07″N 97°17′05″W	Cuero	
39	Leske Bar		October 31, 1988 (#88001969)	432 W. Main; 29°05′30″N 97°17′41″W	Cuero	Demolished by 2005, after being damaged in a flood in 1998
40	Valentine Ley House	Valentine Ley House	October 31, 1988 (#88001979)	206 E. Newman; 29°05′10″N 97°17′30″W	Cuero	
41	Lynch-Probst House		October 31, 1988 (#88001951)	502 E. Broadway; 29°05′31″N 97°17′06″W	Cuero	Demolished
42	Macedonia Baptist Church	Macedonia Baptist Church	October 31, 1988 (#88001967)	512 S. Indianola; 29°05′12″N 97°17′54″W	Cuero	
43	Frank Marie House	Frank Marie House	October 31, 1988 (#88001959)	402 E. French; 29°05′36″N 97°17′07″W	Cuero	
44	May-Hickey House		October 27, 1988 (#88002129)	FM 682 1.7 mi. S of jct. with TX 111; 29°15′39″N 97°08′40″W	Yoakum	Recorded Texas Historic Landmark
45	Meissner-Pleasants House	Meissner-Pleasants House	October 31, 1988 (#88001962)	108 N. Hunt; 29°05′21″N 97°17′12″W	Cuero	
46	Edward Mugge House	Edward Mugge House	October 31, 1988 (#88001994)	218 N. Terrell; 29°05′30″N 97°17′33″W	Cuero	Recorded Texas Historic Landmark
47	Municipal Power Plant	Municipal Power Plant	November 15, 1996 (#96001356)	810 Front St. 29°17′08″N 97°09′04″W	Yoakum	Recorded Texas Historic Landmark; now the city library
48	Old Beer and Ice Warehouse	Old Beer and Ice Warehouse	October 31, 1988 (#88001985)	104 SW Railroad; 29°05′23″N 97°17′33″W	Cuero	
49	Charles J. and Alvina Ott House	Charles J. and Alvina Ott House	October 31, 1988 (#88001965)	306 N. Hunt; 29°05′27″N 97°17′10″W	Cuero	
50	S. I. Ott House	S. I. Ott House	October 31, 1988 (#88001964)	302 N. Hunt; 29°05′26″N 97°17′11″W	Cuero	
51	O. F. and Mary Prigden House	O. F. and Mary Prigden House	October 31, 1988 (#88001958)	401 E. French; 29°05′34″N 97°17′08″W	Cuero	
52	J. M. Reuss House	J. M. Reuss House	October 31, 1988 (#88001991)	315 Stockdale; 29°05′09″N 97°17′24″W	Cuero	
53	St. Michael's Catholic Church	St. Michael's Catholic Church	October 31, 1988 (#88001971)	202 N. McLeod; 29°05′24″N 97°17′15″W	Cuero	
54	State Highway 27 Bridge at the Guadalupe River	State Highway 27 Bridge at the Guadalupe River	October 10, 1996 (#96001122)	US 87, .13 mi. S of jct. with US 183; 29°03′55″N 97°19′20″W	Cuero	
55	Elisha Stevens House	Elisha Stevens House	October 31, 1988 (#88001984)	408 E. Prairie; 29°05′44″N 97°17′02″W	Cuero	
56	Terrell-Reuss Streets Historic District	Terrell-Reuss Streets Historic District	October 31, 1988 (#88001997)	300 to 900 blocks of Terrell, 500 to 900 blocks of Indianola, and 200 blk. of W. Reuss to 400 blk. of E. Reuss; 29°05′44″N 97°17′18″W	Cuero	Includes Recorded Texas Historic Landmarks
57	W. F. Thomson House	W. F. Thomson House	October 31, 1988 (#88001972)	608 N. McLeod; 29°05′37″N 97°17′08″W	Cuero	
58	Dane Wittenbert House	Dane Wittenbert House	October 31, 1988 (#88001966)	402 S. Hunt; 29°05′05″N 97°17′20″W	Cuero	
59	Charles Wittmer House	Charles Wittmer House	October 31, 1988 (#88001977)	110 E. Newman; 29°05′11″N 97°17′33″W	Cuero	
60	Wofford-Finney House	Wofford-Finney House	August 14, 1992 (#92000984)	202 E. Prairie St. 29°05′48″N 97°17′11″W	Cuero	

== Frio County ==
	Name on the Register	Image	Date listed	Location	City or town	Description
1	Old Frio County Jail	Old Frio County Jail	November 19, 1979 (#79002941)	E. Medina and S. Pecan Sts. 28°53′16″N 99°05′35″W	Pearsall	State Antiquities Landmark, Recorded Texas Historic Landmark; presently Frio Pioneer Jail Museum

== Gillespie County ==
	Name on the Register	Image	Date listed	Location	City or town	Description
1	Cave Creek School	Cave Creek School	December 29, 2004 (#04001415)	470 Cave Creek Rd. 30°18′30″N 98°43′37″W	Fredericksburg	
2	Cherry Spring School	Cherry Spring School	May 6, 2005 (#05000389)	5973 RM 2323; 30°27′50″N 98°56′54″W	Fredericksburg	Recorded Texas Historic Landmark
3	Crabapple School	Crabapple School	May 6, 2005 (#05000390)	14671 Lower Crabapple Rd. 30°26′30″N 98°49′54″W	Fredericksburg	
4	Enchanted Rock Archeological District	Enchanted Rock Archeological District	August 29, 1984 (#84001740)	Off Ranch Rd 965 at the Gillespie-Llano county line 30°30′20″N 98°49′05″W	Fredericksburg	National Natural Landmark; extends into Llano County
5	Feller-Barsch Homestead		September 12, 2019 (#100004372)	614 Ellen Lane; 30°12′34″N 98°43′14″W	Fredericksburg	
6	Fort Martin Scott	Fort Martin Scott	January 20, 1980 (#80004121)	The south side of Fredericksburg on US Hwy 290; 30°14′58″N 98°50′47″W	Fredericksburg	State Antiquities Landmark
7	Fredericksburg Historic District	Fredericksburg Historic District	October 14, 1970 (#70000749)	Roughly bounded by Elk, Schubert, Acorn, and Creek Sts; 30°16′33″N 98°52′25″W	Fredericksburg	Contains State Antiquities Landmark, multiple Recorded Texas Historic Landmarks
8	Fredericksburg Memorial Library	Fredericksburg Memorial Library	March 11, 1971 (#71000935)	Courthouse Sq. 30°16′31″N 98°52′24″W	Fredericksburg	State Antiquities Landmark, part of Fredericksburg Historic District
9	HA. 19 (Japanese Midget Submarine)	HA. 19 (Japanese Midget Submarine)	June 30, 1989 (#89001428)	National Museum of the Pacific War, 340 East Main St; 30°16′22″N 98°52′03″W	Fredericksburg	State Antiquities Landmark; part of the Japanese attack force Pearl Harbor that accidentally grounded and was captured. Its location was Monroe County, Florida but was moved to the National Museum of the Pacific War.
10	Klein Frankreich Rural Historic District		June 30, 2023 (#100009111)	3723 to 5083 North US 87, 103 to 206 Old Mason Rd. 30°18′24″N 98°54′23″W	Fredericksburg vicinity	
11	Lower South Grape Creek School	Lower South Grape Creek School	May 6, 2005 (#05000391)	10273 E US 290; 30°13′29″N 98°43′41″W	Luckenbach	Recorded Texas Historic Landmark
12	Luckenbach School	Luckenbach School	May 6, 2005 (#05000392)	3566 Luckenbach Rd. 30°11′12″N 98°45′16″W	Luckenbach	Recorded Texas Historic Landmark
13	Lyndon B. Johnson National Historical Park	Lyndon B. Johnson National Historical Park	December 2, 1969 (#69000202)	Lyndon B. Johnson National Historical Park; 30°16′17″N 98°24′53″W	Johnson City	Contains National Historic Landmark, Recorded Texas Historic Landmark; birthplace, home and ranch of President Lyndon B. Johnson.
14	Meusebach Creek School	Meusebach Creek School	May 6, 2005 (#05000393)	515 Kuhlmann Rd. 30°12′22″N 98°51′23″W	Fredericksburg	
15	Morris Ranch Schoolhouse	Morris Ranch Schoolhouse	March 29, 1983 (#83003142)	Morris Ranch Rd. 30°13′07″N 99°00′56″W	Morris Ranch	Recorded Texas Historic Landmark
16	Nebgen School	Nebgen School	May 6, 2005 (#05000394)	1718 N. Grape Creek Rd. 30°19′01″N 98°37′18″W	Fredericksburg	
17	Pecan Creek School	Pecan Creek School	May 10, 2005 (#05000418)	3410 Pecan Creek Rd. 30°22′59″N 98°59′42″W	Fredericksburg	
18	Rheingold School	Rheingold School	May 6, 2005 (#05000388)	334 Rheingold School Rd. 30°20′42″N 98°41′13″W	Fredericksburg	
19	St. Mary's Catholic Church	St. Mary's Catholic Church	June 21, 1983 (#83003143)	306 W. San Antonio; 30°16′37″N 98°52′37″W	Fredericksburg	Recorded Texas Historic Landmark, part of Fredericksburg Historic District
20	Williams Creek School	Williams Creek School	May 6, 2005 (#05000384)	5501 South RM 1623; 30°11′45″N 98°36′01″W	Stonewall	Recorded Texas Historic Landmark
21	Willow City School	Willow City School	May 6, 2005 (#05000385)	2501 RM 1323; 30°24′06″N 98°42′17″W	Willow City	
22	Wrede School	Wrede School	June 1, 2005 (#05000519)	3929 S. TX 16; 30°13′58″N 98°54′34″W	Fredericksburg	

== Goliad County ==
	Name on the Register	Image	Date listed	Location	City or town	Description
1	Charles H. and Catherine B. Baker House	Charles H. and Catherine B. Baker House	July 25, 1985 (#85001616)	401 S. Commercial St. 28°39′52″N 97°23′35″W	Goliad	
2	Dr. L.W. and Martha E.S. Chilton House	Dr. L.W. and Martha E.S. Chilton House	April 9, 1998 (#98000354)	242 N. Chilton St. 28°40′13″N 97°23′39″W	Goliad	
3	Fair Oaks Ranch		March 8, 2007 (#07000127)	14509 US 59 S 28°31′40″N 97°32′55″W	Berclair	
4	Fannin Battleground State Historic Site	Fannin Battleground State Historic Site	February 28, 2017 (#100000695)	734 FM 2506; 28°41′11″N 97°13′58″W	Fannin	State Historic Site
5	Goliad County Courthouse Historic District	Goliad County Courthouse Historic District	June 29, 1976 (#76002034)	Roughly bounded by E. Franklin, S. Washington, E. Fannin, and S. Chilton Sts. 28°39′57″N 97°23′31″W	Goliad	Includes State Antiquities Landmarks, Recorded Texas Historic Landmarks
6	Goliad State Park Historic District	Goliad State Park Historic District	March 12, 2001 (#01000258)	US 183 at San Antonio River; 28°39′18″N 97°23′14″W	Goliad	State Historic Site, includes State Antiquities Landmarks, Recorded Texas Historic Landmark
7	Nuestra Senora del Espiritu Santo de Zuniga Site	Nuestra Senora del Espiritu Santo de Zuniga Site	August 22, 1977 (#77001446)	US 183 at San Antonio River; 28°39′26″N 97°23′12″W	Goliad	State Antiquities Landmark, Recorded Texas Historic Landmark, part of Goliad State Park Historic District
8	Old Market House Museum	Old Market House Museum	October 18, 1972 (#72001362)	S. Market and Franklin Sts. 28°40′01″N 97°23′28″W	Goliad	State Antiquities Landmark, Recorded Texas Historic Landmark, part of Goliad County Courthouse Historic District
9	Capt. Barton Peck House	Capt. Barton Peck House	February 23, 1979 (#79002947)	W of Goliad at Hill and Post Oak St. 28°39′59″N 97°24′05″W	Goliad	Recorded Texas Historic Landmark
10	Presidio Nuestra Senora De Loreto De La Bahia	Presidio Nuestra Senora De Loreto De La Bahia	December 24, 1967 (#67000024)	1 mi (1.6 km). S of Goliad State Park on U.S. 183; 28°38′51″N 97°22′57″W	Goliad	Recorded Texas Historic Landmark
11	Ruins of Mission Nuestra Senora del Rosario de los Cujanes	Ruins of Mission Nuestra Senora del Rosario de los Cujanes	September 22, 1972 (#72001363)	U.S. Highway 59 about 4 miles west of Goliad; 28°38′40″N 97°26′20″W	Goliad	Part of Goliad State Park & Historic Site
12	San Antonio River Valley (West of Goliad) Rural Historic District	San Antonio River Valley (West of Goliad) Rural Historic District	December 14, 1995 (#95001453)	28°38′52″N 97°28′42″W	Goliad	
13	Jessie W. Stoddard House	Jessie W. Stoddard House	January 29, 1992 (#91002020)	Jct. of US 183, Fannin and Hord Sts. 28°39′54″N 97°23′18″W	Goliad	Recorded Texas Historic Landmark

== Gonzales County ==
	Name on the Register	Image	Date listed	Location	City or town	Description
1	Braches House	Braches House	March 11, 1971 (#71000936)	12 mi (19 km). SE of Gonzales off U.S. 90A; 29°28′33″N 97°18′32″W	Gonzales	Recorded Texas Historic Landmark
2	Cuero I Archeological District	Cuero I Archeological District	October 9, 1974 (#74002271)	Address restricted	Cuero	Extends into DeWitt County
3	Edwards High School		April 3, 2024 (#100010161)	1427 Fly Street; 29°30′35″N 97°26′26″W	Gonzales	
4	First Shot Monuments Historic District	First Shot Monuments Historic District	February 21, 2017 (#100000673)	TX Spur Rd. 95 from TX 97 to Stevens Creek; 29°26′20″N 97°31′18″W	Cost	
5	Gonzales Commercial Historic District	Gonzales Commercial Historic District	August 30, 1996 (#96000935)	Roughly bounded by Water, Saint Andrew, Saint Peter, and Saint Matthew Sts. 29°30′05″N 97°27′11″W	Gonzales	Includes State Antiquities Landmarks, Recorded Texas Historic Landmarks
6	Gonzales County Courthouse	Gonzales County Courthouse	June 19, 1972 (#72001364)	Bounded by St. Louis, St. Paul. St. Lawrence, and St. Joseph Sts. 29°30′04″N 97°27′08″W	Gonzales	State Antiquities Landmark, Recorded Texas Historic Landmark; part of Gonzales Commercial Historic District
7	Gonzales County Jail	Gonzales County Jail	May 21, 1975 (#75001985)	Courthouse Sq. on St. Lawrence St. 29°30′05″N 97°27′07″W	Gonzales	State Antiquities Landmark, Recorded Texas Historic Landmark; part of Gonzales Commercial Historic District
8	Gonzales Memorial Museum and Amphitheater Historic District	Gonzales Memorial Museum and Amphitheater Historic District	January 13, 2004 (#03001414)	414 Smith St. 29°30′14″N 97°26′37″W	Gonzales	State Antiquities Landmark, Recorded Texas Historic Landmark
9	William Buckner and Sue Houston House	William Buckner and Sue Houston House	August 14, 2003 (#03000769)	621 E. St. George St. 29°30′13″N 97°27′01″W	Gonzales	Recorded Texas Historic Landmark
10	Kennard House	Kennard House	January 25, 1971 (#71000937)	621 St. Louis St. 29°30′06″N 97°26′57″W	Gonzales	Recorded Texas Historic Landmark
11	Leesville Schoolhouse	Leesville Schoolhouse	May 25, 1978 (#78002937)	E of Leesville off TX 80; 29°24′24″N 97°44′07″W	Leesville	
12	Thomas Harrison and Mollie Spooner House	Thomas Harrison and Mollie Spooner House	July 5, 2003 (#03000610)	207 St. Francis St. 29°30′10″N 97°27′20″W	Gonzales	

== Guadalupe County ==
	Name on the Register	Image	Date listed	Location	City or town	Description
1	Dublin Plantation	Dublin Plantation	December 11, 2013 (#13000918)	3135 Cottonwood Creek Road; 29°42′15″N 97°46′58″W	Kingsbury vicinity	Recorded Texas Historic Landmark
2	Erskine House No. 1	Erskine House No. 1	August 25, 1970 (#70000750)	902 N. Austin St. 29°34′01″N 97°57′51″W	Seguin	Recorded Texas Historic Landmark
3	Robert Hall House	Robert Hall House	October 25, 1979 (#79002949)	214 S. Travis St. 29°34′03″N 97°58′00″W	Seguin	
4	Hardscramble	Hardscramble	July 6, 2011 (#11000424)	1806 Tschoepe Rd. 29°38′04″N 97°52′52″W	Seguin vicinity	
5	Joseph F. Johnson House	Joseph F. Johnson House	June 23, 1978 (#78002940)	761 Johnson Ave. 29°33′49″N 97°58′26″W	Seguin	
6	King-Woods Farmstead	King-Woods Farmstead	April 2, 2018 (#100002268)	920 E Court St. 29°34′10″N 97°57′15″W	Seguin	
7	Los Nogales	Los Nogales	March 24, 1972 (#72001365)	S. River and E. Live Oak Sts. 29°33′57″N 97°57′47″W	Seguin	Recorded Texas Historic Landmark
8	Park Hotel	Park Hotel	May 23, 1980 (#80004124)	217 S. River St. 29°34′02″N 97°57′49″W	Seguin	
9	Saffold Dam	Saffold Dam	November 15, 1979 (#79002950)	Off TX 123; 29°33′03″N 97°58′12″W	Seguin	State Antiquities Landmark
10	Sebastopol	Sebastopol	August 25, 1970 (#70000751)	NE corner of W. Court and N. Erkel Sts. 29°34′12″N 97°58′21″W	Seguin	State Antiquities Landmark, Recorded Texas Historic Landmark
11	Seguin Commercial Historic District	Seguin Commercial Historic District	December 15, 1983 (#83003773); August 14, 2013 boundary increase (#03000768)	Roughly bounded by Camp, Myrtle, Washington, and Crockett Sts. 29°34′13″N 97°57′51″W	Seguin	Includes Recorded Texas Historic Landmark; 70 buildings, 1 structure, 1875-1949; boundary increase in 2013 added 9 buildings.
12	State Highway 3-A Bridge at Cibolo Creek	State Highway 3-A Bridge at Cibolo Creek	October 10, 1996 (#96001112)	I-10 at the Bexar and Guadalupe Cnty. line 29°30′05″N 98°11′11″W	Schertz	Extends into Bexar County
13	Sweet Home Vocational and Agricultural High School	Sweet Home Vocational and Agricultural High School	November 19, 1998 (#98001417)	10 mi (16 km). S of Seguin on Sweet Home Rd. 29°27′40″N 98°02′21″W	Seguin	Recorded Texas Historic Landmark
14	Edward and Texanna Tewes House	Edward and Texanna Tewes House	January 9, 1997 (#96001566)	8280 Linne Rd. 29°28′03″N 98°06′11″W	Seguin	Recorded Texas Historic Landmark
15	Wilson Utility Pottery Kilns Archeological District	Wilson Utility Pottery Kilns Archeological District	April 16, 1975 (#75001987)	Address restricted	Capote	Roadside historical marker located outside district

== Jackson County ==
	Name on the Register	Image	Date listed	Location	City or town	Description
1	Allen Memorial Presbyterian Church	Allen Memorial Presbyterian Church	June 7, 2016 (#16000351)	301 W. Church St. 28°58′29″N 96°38′46″W	Edna	
2	Archeological Site No. 41JK9	Archeological Site No. 41JK9	August 19, 1994 (#94000833)	Address restricted	Lolita	Wreck of the sidewheel steamer Mary Summers on the Navidad River
3	Edna Theatre	Edna Theatre	September 8, 2011 (#11000652)	201 West Main Street; 28°58′41″N 96°38′52″W	Edna	
4	Jackson County Monument	Jackson County Monument	April 19, 2018 (#100002350)	115 W Main St. 28°58′40″N 96°38′49″W	Edna	
5	Texana Presbyterian Church	Texana Presbyterian Church	September 12, 1979 (#79002982)	Lake Texana Park; 28°56′36″N 96°32′20″W	Edna	Recorded Texas Historic Landmark; relocated from Edna to Brackenridge Recreational Complex in 2001

== Karnes County ==
	Name on the Register	Image	Date listed	Location	City or town	Description
1	Karnes County Courthouse	Karnes County Courthouse	July 26, 2010 (#10000499)	101 Panna Maria Ave. 28°53′07″N 97°54′06″W	Karnes City	State Antiquities Landmark
2	Panna Maria Historic District	Panna Maria Historic District	May 13, 1976 (#76002043)	FM 81 off TX 123; 28°57′26″N 97°53′53″W	Panna Maria	Includes Recorded Texas Historic Landmarks; oldest Polish settlement in the USA; founded in 1854.
3	John Ruckman House	John Ruckman House	June 19, 1979 (#79002987)	6 mi (9.7 km). N of Karnes City off TX 80; 28°56′50″N 97°49′15″W	Karnes City	A provincial interpretation of the Greek Revival style built in 1878.

== Kendall County ==
	Name on the Register	Image	Date listed	Location	City or town	Description
1	Otto Brinkmann House	Otto Brinkmann House	December 12, 1977 (#77001457)	602 High St. 29°58′04″N 98°54′32″W	Comfort	Part of Comfort Historic District; Recorded Texas Historic Landmark
2	Comfort Historic District	Comfort Historic District	May 29, 1979 (#79002989)	State Highway 27; also roughly bounded by State Highway 27, Lindner Ave., Cypress Creek, 1st St., and Front St., 29°58′03″N 98°54′40″W	Comfort	Specific boundaries represent a boundary increase of August 25, 2004; contains State Antiquities Landmarks, Recorded Texas Historic Landmarks
3	Joseph Dienger Building	Joseph Dienger Building	January 19, 1984 (#84001901)	106 W. Blanco Rd. 29°47′40″N 98°43′55″W	Boerne	Recorded Texas Historic Landmark
4	Gazebo for Albert Steves	Gazebo for Albert Steves	December 23, 2004 (#04001171)	105 FM 473, at east portion of property 29°58′12″N 98°53′10″W	Comfort	Gazebo at Haven River Inn; Sculpture by Dionicio Rodriguez
5	Herff-Rozelle Farm	Herff-Rozelle Farm	December 3, 2009 (#09000983)	33 Herff Rd. 29°46′51″N 98°42′53″W	Boerne	
6	Hygieostatic Bat Roost	Hygieostatic Bat Roost	March 28, 1983 (#83003144)	FM 473 E of Comfort; 29°58′13″N 98°53′05″W	Comfort	Recorded Texas Historic Landmark
7	Kendall County Courthouse and Jail	Kendall County Courthouse and Jail	February 15, 1980 (#80004138)	Public Sq. 29°47′40″N 98°43′50″W	Boerne	State Antiquities Landmark, Recorded Texas Historic Landmark
8	Kendall Inn	Kendall Inn	June 29, 1976 (#76002045)	128 W Blanco Rd; 29°47′38″N 98°44′00″W	Boerne	Recorded Texas Historic Landmark
9	Sisterdale Valley District	Sisterdale Valley District	January 8, 1975 (#75001996)	SR 1376; 29°58′34″N 98°42′56″W	Sisterdale	
10	Treue der Union Monument	Treue der Union Monument	November 29, 1978 (#78002966)	High St. between Third and Fourth; 29°58′10″N 98°54′49″W	Comfort	Part of Comfort Historic District; State Antiquities Landmark
11	Voelcker-Sueltenfuss House		October 10, 2017 (#100001722)	82 Swede Springs Rd. 29°52′19″N 98°34′49″W	Boerne	

== Kerr County ==
	Name on the Register	Image	Date listed	Location	City or town	Description
1	Guthrie Building	Guthrie Building	June 8, 2011 (#11000345)	241 Earl Garrett St. 30°02′47″N 99°08′22″W	Kerrville	Recorded Texas Historic Landmark
2	Masonic Building	Masonic Building	January 12, 1984 (#84001903)	211 Earl Garrett St. 30°02′44″N 99°08′23″W	Kerrville	Recorded Texas Historic Landmark
3	Old Camp Verde	Old Camp Verde	May 25, 1973 (#73001968)	Camp Verde Rd. 29°53′25″N 99°07′13″W	Camp Verde	Includes Recorded Texas Historic Landmark
4	Capt. Charles Schreiner Mansion	Capt. Charles Schreiner Mansion	April 14, 1975 (#75001997)	216 Earl Garrett St. 30°02′46″N 99°08′23″W	Kerrville	Includes Recorded Texas Historic Landmarks
5	Tulahteka		August 11, 1982 (#82004510)	South of Kerrville on TX 16; 30°02′13″N 99°08′42″W	Kerrville	Also known as the Louis A. Schreiner Mansion
6	Woolls Building	Woolls Building	April 26, 2002 (#02000403)	318 San Antonio; 29°56′40″N 99°02′13″W	Center Point	Recorded Texas Historic Landmark

== Lavaca County ==
	Name on the Register	Image	Date listed	Location	City or town	Description
1	Ascension of Our Lord Catholic Church	Ascension of Our Lord Catholic Church	June 21, 1983 (#83003148)	FM 957; 29°35′03″N 96°59′08″W	Moravia	Churches with Decorative Interior Painting TR
2	Baker House	Baker House	November 5, 1998 (#98001345)	211 Pecan St. 29°17′19″N 97°08′25″W	Yoakum	
3	Church of the Blessed Virgin Mary, the Queen of Peace	Church of the Blessed Virgin Mary, the Queen of Peace	June 21, 1983 (#83003149)	FM 340; 29°20′32″N 97°04′08″W	Sweet Home	Churches with Decorative Interior Painting TR
4	Church of the Immaculate Conception of Blessed Virgin Mary	Church of the Immaculate Conception of Blessed Virgin Mary	June 21, 1983 (#83003150)	FM 2672; 29°26′52″N 96°59′49″W	St. Mary's	Churches with Decorative Interior Painting TR
5	Kahn and Stanzel Building		November 24, 2014 (#14000964)	115 N. Main St; 29°26′43″N 96°56′37″W	Hallettsville	
6	Lavaca County Courthouse	Lavaca County Courthouse	March 11, 1971 (#71000945)	Bounded by LaGrange, 2nd, 3rd, and Main Sts. 29°26′41″N 96°56′33″W	Hallettsville	State Antiquities Landmark
7	Lay-Bozka House	Lay-Bozka House	January 25, 1971 (#71000946)	205 Fairwinds; 29°26′31″N 96°56′50″W	Hallettsville	Recorded Texas Historic Landmark
8	Sts. Cyril and Methodius Church	Sts. Cyril and Methodius Church	June 21, 1983 (#83003151)	100 St. Ludmilla St. 29°25′23″N 97°09′56″W	Shiner	Recorded Texas Historic Landmark; Churches with Decorative Interior Painting TR
9	Yoakum Commercial Historic District	Yoakum Commercial Historic District	October 29, 2019 (#100004095)	Roughly bounded by Nelson St., South St., Culpepper St., and Forrest St. 29°17′15″N 97°09′05″W	Yoakum	

== Medina County ==
	Name on the Register	Image	Date listed	Location	City or town	Description
1	Castroville Historic District	Castroville Historic District	April 3, 1970 (#70000758)	Roughly bounded by Medina River, SR 471, Gime, Houston, and Constantinople; 29°21′21″N 98°52′45″W	Castroville	Includes State Historic Site, State Antiquities Landmark, and several Recorded Texas Historic Landmarks
2	Dan's Meat Market and Saloon	Dan's Meat Market and Saloon	April 11, 2024 (#100010210)	1303 Lorenzo Street; 29°21′24″N 98°52′42″W	Castroville	
3	D'Hanis Historic District	D'Hanis Historic District	June 24, 1976 (#76002051)	7 mi (11 km). W of Hondo; 29°20′N 99°16′W	D'Hanis	
4	Charles de Montel House	Charles de Montel House	November 25, 1980 (#80004142)	NW of Castroville; 29°22′05″N 98°54′06″W	Castroville	
5	Devine Opera House	Devine Opera House	April 24, 1975 (#75001999)	206 Commercial Dr; 29°08′17″N 98°54′20″W	Devine	
6	Landmark Inn Complex	Landmark Inn Complex	January 7, 1972 (#72001368)	Florella and Florence Sts. 29°21′16″N 98°52′28″W	Castroville	Part of Castroville Historic District; State Historic Site, State Antiquities Landmark, and Recorded Texas Historic Landmark
7	Medina Dam	Medina Dam	March 15, 1976 (#76002050)	N of Castroville on the Medina River; 29°32′25″N 98°56′02″W	Castroville	State Antiquities Landmark
8	Rainbow Theater		December 3, 2024 (#100011087)	410 Paris Street; 29°21′24″N 98°52′40″W	Castroville	
9	Saathoff House		September 9, 1982 (#82004515)	Quihi-Stormhill Rd. 29°23′49″N 99°00′30″W	Quihi	Recorded Texas Historic Landmark

== Wilson County ==
	Name on the Register	Image	Date listed	Location	City or town	Description
1	Beauregard Ranch		September 27, 2024 (#100010865)	Address Restricted	Falls City vicinity	
2	Floresville Chronicle-Journal Building		August 17, 2020 (#100005461)	1000 C St. 29°07′57″N 98°09′33″W	Floresville	
3	Mueller Bridge	Mueller Bridge	October 16, 2007 (#07001094)	CR 337 over Cibolo Cr. 29°21′05″N 98°04′28″W	La Vernia	Recorded Texas Historic Landmark
4	Rancho de las Cabras		March 20, 1973 (#73001985)	S of Floresville SE of Hwy 97; 29°05′42″N 98°10′00″W	Floresville	Part of the San Antonio Missions World Heritage Site
5	Whitehall	Whitehall	February 1, 1980 (#80004161)	N of Sutherland Springs on SR 539; 29°19′02″N 98°03′28″W	Sutherland Springs	Recorded Texas Historic Landmark
6	Wilson County Courthouse and Jail	Wilson County Courthouse and Jail	May 5, 1978 (#78003001)	Public Sq. 29°08′00″N 98°09′27″W	Floresville	State Antiquities Landmark, includes Recorded Texas Historic Landmark
