= Church of the Blessed Virgin Mary =

The Church of the Blessed Virgin Mary may refer to:

- Church of the Blessed Virgin Mary, Emborough, Somerset, England
- Church of the Blessed Virgin Mary, Huish Episcopi, Somerset, England
- Church of the Blessed Virgin Mary, Staré, Slovakia.
- Church of the Blessed Virgin Mary, Verkhneye Myackovo, Russia
- Church of the Blessed Virgin Mary, the Queen of Peace, Sweet Home, Lavaca County, Texas, United States
- Collegiate Church of the Blessed Virgin Mary and St Anne, Glasgow, Scotland
- Cathedral Church of the Blessed Virgin Mary & St Chad, Lichfield (commonly known as Lichfield Cathedral), England
- Cathedral Church of the Blessed Virgin Mary of Lincoln (commonly known as Lincoln Cathedral), England
- Cathedral and Parish Church of the Blessed Virgin Mary (commonly known as Southwell Minster), England

== See also ==
- St Mary's Church (disambiguation)
