= National Register of Historic Places listings in Bandera County, Texas =

Location of Bandera County in Texas

This is a list of the National Register of Historic Places listings in Bandera County, Texas.

This is intended to be a complete list of properties listed on the National Register of Historic Places in Bandera County, Texas. There are four properties listed on the National Register in the county. One property is a State Antiquities Landmark and holds two Recorded Texas Historic Landmarks. The remaining properties are also designated as Recorded Texas Historic Landmarks.

This National Park Service list is complete through NPS recent listings posted March 21, 2025.

== Current listings ==
The locations of National Register properties may be seen in a mapping service provided.

	Name on the Register	Image	Date listed	Location	City or town	Description
1	Bandera County Courthouse and Jail	Bandera County Courthouse and Jail	October 31, 1979 (#79002911)	Public Sq., 12th and Maple Sts. 29°43′36″N 99°04′21″W	Bandera	State Antiquities Landmark, Recorded Texas Historic Landmarks
2	Jureczki House	Jureczki House	January 11, 1980 (#80004075)	607 Cypress St. 29°43′13″N 99°04′31″W	Bandera	Recorded Texas Historic Landmark
3	B.F. Langford Jr. and Mary Hay House	B.F. Langford Jr. and Mary Hay House	March 22, 2004 (#04000229)	415 Fourteenth St. 29°43′41″N 99°04′12″W	Bandera	Recorded Texas Historic Landmark
4	River Oaks Courts	River Oaks Courts	January 28, 2019 (#100003354)	14349 TX 16; 29°48′07″N 99°15′13″W	Medina	Recorded Texas Historic Landmark

== See also ==
- National Register of Historic Places listings in Texas
- Recorded Texas Historic Landmarks in Bandera County
