= Nebgen School =

- U.S. National Register of Historic Places
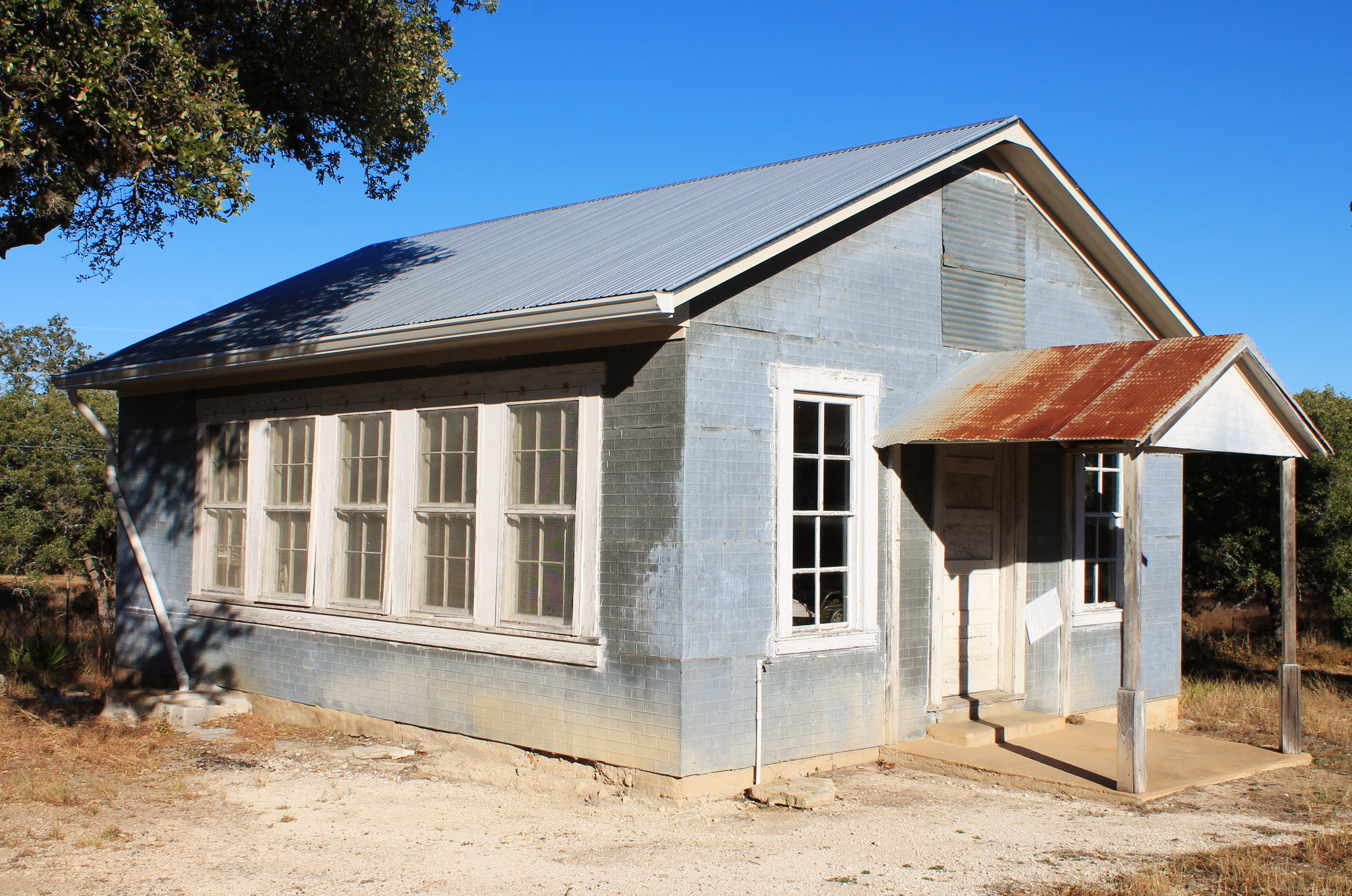
- Nebgen School ca. 2012

- Location within Texas Location within the United States
- Nearest city: Fredericksburg, Texas
- Coordinates: 30.316944°N 98.621667°W
- Area: 2.28 acres (0.92 ha)
- Built: 1936–1945
- NRHP reference No.: 2005000394
- Added to NRHP: May 6, 2005

The current Nebgen School house was erected in 1936, replacing the earlier 1901 school building. The former structure had itself been an update of the original 1881 log cabin erected by the family of Truman Taylor on land the family provided.

The Gilmer-Aikin Laws of the Texas State Legislature of 1947 ultimately resulted in consolidation of school districts in order to assure there would be at least a minimum of basic public-schooling throughout Texas. Nebgen consolidated with Stonewall Independent School District in 1949, which is served by the Fredericksburg Independent School District.

The school was added to the National Register of Historic Places on May 6, 2005.

== See also ==
- National Register of Historic Places listings in the Alamo region of Texas: Other
