= National Register of Historic Places listings in Gonzales County, Texas =

Location of Gonzales County in Texas

Gonzales County, Texas, has three districts and nine individual properties listed on the National Register of Historic Places. Six individually listed properties are Recorded Texas Historic Landmarks including three that are also State Antiquities Landmarks. One district contains additional Recorded Texas Historic Landmarks and State Antiquities Landmarks.

This National Park Service list is complete through NPS recent listings posted September 18, 2026.

== Current listings ==
The publicly disclosed locations of National Register properties and districts may be seen in a mapping service provided.

	Name on the Register	Image	Date listed	Location	City or town	Description
1	Braches House	Braches House	March 11, 1971 (#71000936)	12 mi (19 km). SE of Gonzales off U.S. 90A; 29°28′33″N 97°18′32″W	Gonzales	Recorded Texas Historic Landmark
2	Cuero I Archeological District	Cuero I Archeological District	October 9, 1974 (#74002271)	Address restricted	Cuero	Extends into DeWitt County
3	Edwards High School		April 3, 2024 (#100010161)	1427 Fly Street; 29°30′35″N 97°26′26″W	Gonzales	
4	First Shot Monuments Historic District	First Shot Monuments Historic District	February 21, 2017 (#100000673)	TX Spur Rd. 95 from TX 97 to Stevens Creek; 29°26′20″N 97°31′18″W	Cost	
5	Gonzales Commercial Historic District	Gonzales Commercial Historic District	August 30, 1996 (#96000935)	Roughly bounded by Water, Saint Andrew, Saint Peter, and Saint Matthew Sts. 29°30′05″N 97°27′11″W	Gonzales	Includes State Antiquities Landmarks, Recorded Texas Historic Landmarks
6	Gonzales County Courthouse	Gonzales County Courthouse	June 19, 1972 (#72001364)	Bounded by St. Louis, St. Paul. St. Lawrence, and St. Joseph Sts. 29°30′04″N 97°27′08″W	Gonzales	State Antiquities Landmark, Recorded Texas Historic Landmark; part of Gonzales Commercial Historic District
7	Gonzales County Jail	Gonzales County Jail	May 21, 1975 (#75001985)	Courthouse Sq. on St. Lawrence St. 29°30′05″N 97°27′07″W	Gonzales	State Antiquities Landmark, Recorded Texas Historic Landmark; part of Gonzales Commercial Historic District
8	Gonzales Memorial Museum and Amphitheater Historic District	Gonzales Memorial Museum and Amphitheater Historic District	January 13, 2004 (#03001414)	414 Smith St. 29°30′14″N 97°26′37″W	Gonzales	State Antiquities Landmark, Recorded Texas Historic Landmark
9	William Buckner and Sue Houston House	William Buckner and Sue Houston House	August 14, 2003 (#03000769)	621 E. St. George St. 29°30′13″N 97°27′01″W	Gonzales	Recorded Texas Historic Landmark
10	Kennard House	Kennard House	January 25, 1971 (#71000937)	621 St. Louis St. 29°30′06″N 97°26′57″W	Gonzales	Recorded Texas Historic Landmark
11	Leesville Schoolhouse	Leesville Schoolhouse	May 25, 1978 (#78002937)	E of Leesville off TX 80; 29°24′24″N 97°44′07″W	Leesville	
12	Thomas Harrison and Mollie Spooner House	Thomas Harrison and Mollie Spooner House	July 5, 2003 (#03000610)	207 St. Francis St. 29°30′10″N 97°27′20″W	Gonzales	

== See also ==
- National Register of Historic Places listings in Texas
- Recorded Texas Historic Landmarks in Gonzales County
