= Klein Frankreich Rural Historic District =

- U.S. National Register of Historic Places
- U.S. Historic district
- Location within Texas Location within the United States
- Location: 3.5 miles northwest of the city of Fredericksburg
- Coordinates: 30°18′24″N 98°54′23″W
- Area: 2,807 acres (1,136 ha)
- Built: 1846
- Architect: Multiple
- NRHP reference No.: 100009111
- Added to NRHP: 2023

Covering approximately 2,807 acres (1,136 ha), the Klein Frankreich Rural Historic District is 3.5 miles (5.6 km) northwest of the city of Fredericksburg, in Gillespie County, Texas. The name Klein Frankreich translates from the original German language as "Little France", and the area was so named because the initial settlers (ca. 1846) believed it resembled rural areas of France. The area has been representative of multiple generations descended from those original settlers. In the decades that followed, succeeding generations of the founding families continued to work the land. In the last half of the 20th century, it became more financially feasible to find employment elsewhere. It was added to the National Register of Historic Places on June 30, 2023.

== See also ==
- National Register of Historic Places listings in the Alamo region of Texas: Other
