= Feller-Barsch Homestead =

- U.S. National Register of Historic Places
- Location within Texas Location within the United States
- Coordinates: 30°12′34″N 98°43′14″W
- Area: 103.6 acres (41.9 ha)
- Built: 1852–1911
- Architect: Multiple
- NRHP reference No.: 100004372
- Added to NRHP: 2019

The Feller-Barsch Homestead is located on private property in Gillespie County, Texas. On September 12, 2019, it was added to the National Register of Historic Places listings in the Alamo region of Texas, as well as the National Register of Historic Places listings in Gillespie County, Texas. It encompasses a portion of the land originally sold by John Coffee Hays and Henry M. Lewis to William Feller in 1852. On or about 1867, Carl Frederick Barsch purchased 100 acres from Clara Feller. Barsch expanded his own property by another 3.6 acres in 1911.
