= National Register of Historic Places listings in Lavaca County, Texas =

Location of Lavaca County in Texas

This is a list of the National Register of Historic Places listings in Lavaca County, Texas.

This is intended to be a complete list of properties listed on the National Register of Historic Places in Lavaca County, Texas. There are nine properties listed on the National Register in the county. One property is a State Antiquities Landmark while two others are Recorded Texas Historic Landmarks.

This National Park Service list is complete through NPS recent listings posted March 21, 2025.

== Current listings ==
The locations of National Register properties may be seen in a mapping service provided.

	Name on the Register	Image	Date listed	Location	City or town	Description
1	Ascension of Our Lord Catholic Church	Ascension of Our Lord Catholic Church	June 21, 1983 (#83003148)	FM 957; 29°35′03″N 96°59′08″W	Moravia	Churches with Decorative Interior Painting TR
2	Baker House	Baker House	November 5, 1998 (#98001345)	211 Pecan St. 29°17′19″N 97°08′25″W	Yoakum	
3	Church of the Blessed Virgin Mary, the Queen of Peace	Church of the Blessed Virgin Mary, the Queen of Peace	June 21, 1983 (#83003149)	FM 340; 29°20′32″N 97°04′08″W	Sweet Home	Churches with Decorative Interior Painting TR
4	Church of the Immaculate Conception of Blessed Virgin Mary	Church of the Immaculate Conception of Blessed Virgin Mary	June 21, 1983 (#83003150)	FM 2672; 29°26′52″N 96°59′49″W	St. Mary's	Churches with Decorative Interior Painting TR
5	Kahn and Stanzel Building		November 24, 2014 (#14000964)	115 N. Main St; 29°26′43″N 96°56′37″W	Hallettsville	
6	Lavaca County Courthouse	Lavaca County Courthouse	March 11, 1971 (#71000945)	Bounded by LaGrange, 2nd, 3rd, and Main Sts. 29°26′41″N 96°56′33″W	Hallettsville	State Antiquities Landmark
7	Lay-Bozka House	Lay-Bozka House	January 25, 1971 (#71000946)	205 Fairwinds; 29°26′31″N 96°56′50″W	Hallettsville	Recorded Texas Historic Landmark
8	Sts. Cyril and Methodius Church	Sts. Cyril and Methodius Church	June 21, 1983 (#83003151)	100 St. Ludmilla St. 29°25′23″N 97°09′56″W	Shiner	Recorded Texas Historic Landmark; Churches with Decorative Interior Painting TR
9	Yoakum Commercial Historic District	Yoakum Commercial Historic District	October 29, 2019 (#100004095)	Roughly bounded by Nelson St., South St., Culpepper St., and Forrest St. 29°17′15″N 97°09′05″W	Yoakum	

== See also ==
- National Register of Historic Places listings in Texas
- Recorded Texas Historic Landmarks in Lavaca County
