= Castroville Historic District =

Historic core of Castroville, Texas

- U.S. National Register of Historic Places
- U.S. Historic district
- The original 1879 Medina County Courthouse (now Castroville City Hall), a historic structure within the district

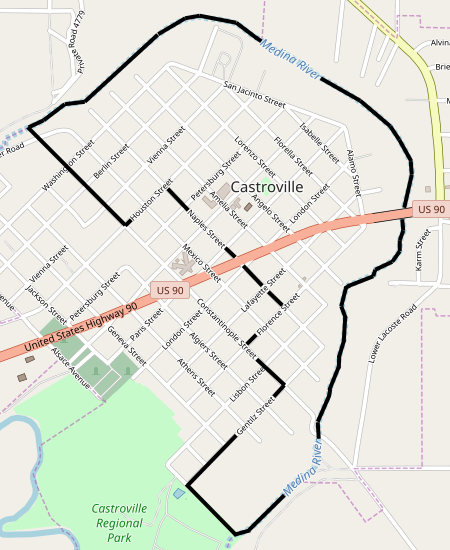
- Map of the Castroville Historic District
- Location: Roughly bounded by the Medina River, SR 471, and Gime, Constantinople and Naples Streets in Castroville, Texas
- Coordinates: 29°21′18″N 98°52′48″W
- Area: 420.6 acres (170.2 ha)
- Architectural style: Colonial Alsatian, Victorian
- NRHP reference No.: 70000758
- Added to NRHP: April 3, 1970

Castroville Historic District is a United States historic district in Castroville, Texas. It includes the oldest parts of the city of Castroville and contains twelve designated contributing properties, including a Texas State Historic Site and numerous Recorded Texas Historic Landmarks. The district was listed on the National Register of Historic Places in 1970.

== History and significance ==
Castroville was established in 1844 by Henri Castro, an empresario of the Republic of Texas, who brought several dozen European families from the Upper Rhine valley regions of Alsace and Baden to populate his land grant along the Medina River, some 25 miles (40 km) west of San Antonio. Long after its foundation the city retained a strongly Alsatian character, both in the continued common use of the Alsatian language into the mid-twentieth century, and in the Alsatian architecture that characterizes the community to the present day.

The oldest portion of the city, surrounded on three sides by a bend in the Medina River, was designated a United States historic district on the National Register of Historic Places on April 3, 1970, in recognition of the old town's well-preserved colonial Alsatian architecture and unusual cultural heritage, for which it is known as the "little Alsace" of Texas. Castroville's was one of the first three United States historic districts to be designated in Texas.

The NRHP nomination specified twelve contributing properties within the district, including the Landmark Inn State Historic Site (an NRHP-listed site in its own right), St. Louis Catholic Church, and a number of private residences exemplifying the prevailing architectural style. Including some of these twelve properties, the district contains numerous Recorded Texas Historic Landmarks, many of them especially well-preserved residences of early colonists.

== Architectural character ==
The structures surveyed during the designation of the historic district, constructed between 1844 and the 1880s, share common architectural elements that mark the old town's Alsatian character. The oldest houses typically contain two rooms and a loft, with thick, stuccoed limestone walls, beams of cypress or cedar wood, and sloping, gabled roofs of tin or cypress wood shingles. A kitchen is typically either attached as a rear shed or built into a nearby free-standing structure. The houses are generally set close to the fronts of their lots, and many have full-width front porches.

== Historic properties ==
Historic properties within Castroville Historic District
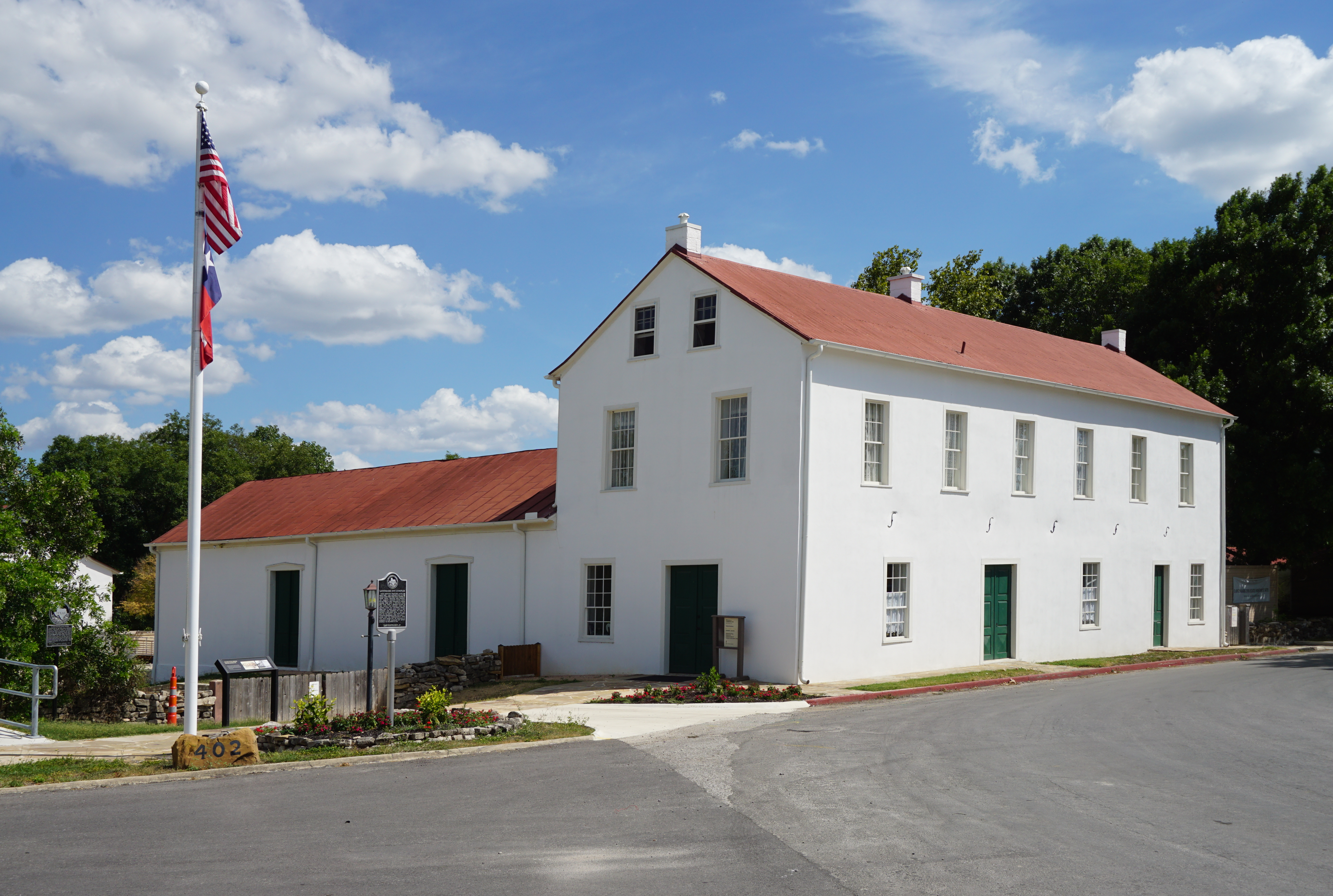
Landmark Inn State Historic Site (about 1844); National Register of Historic Places #72001368, 1972; Recorded Texas Historic Landmark #3031, 1965

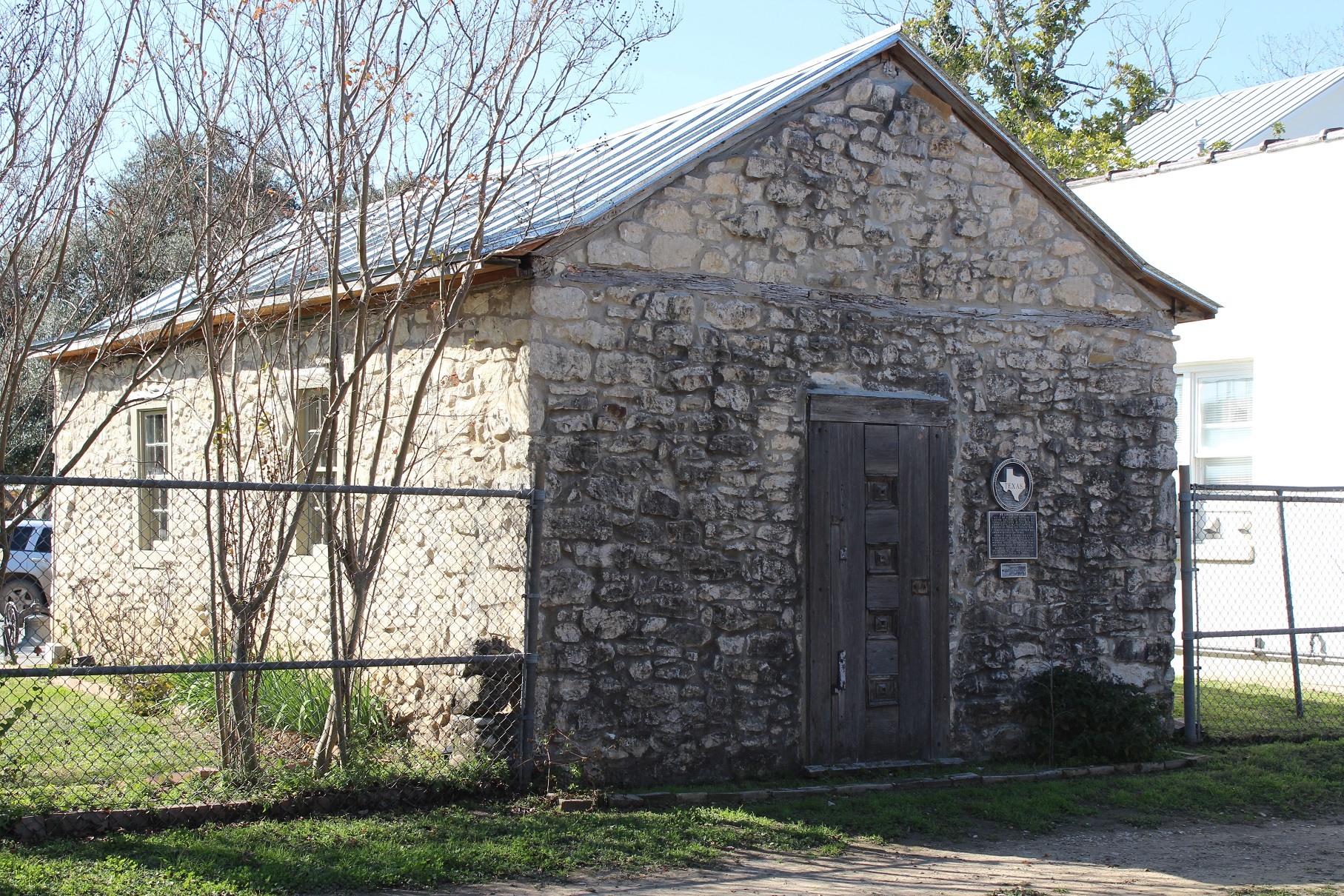
Old St. Louis Church (1846); Recorded Texas Historic Landmark #5053, 1966

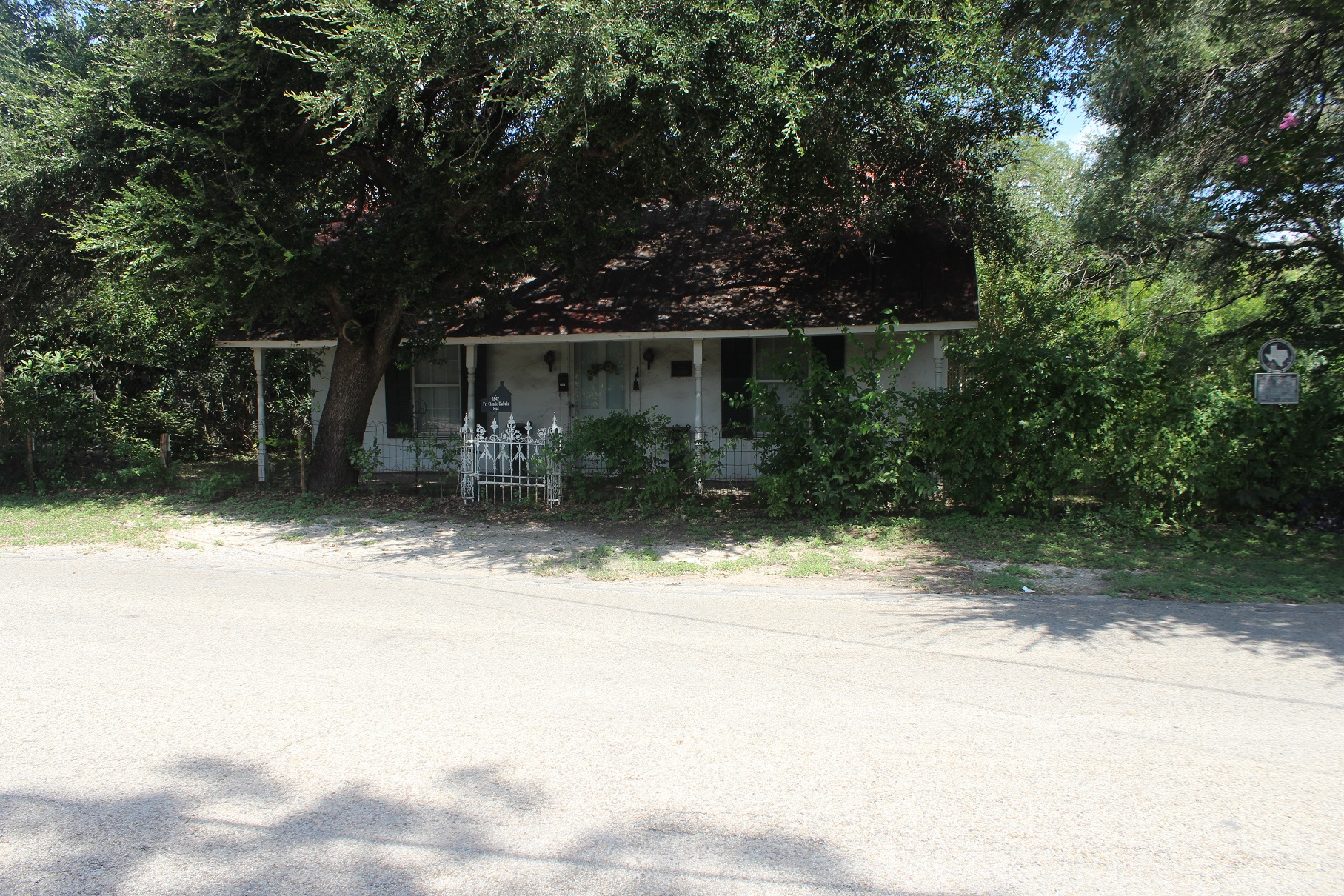
Claude M. Dubuis House (1847); Recorded Texas Historic Landmark #1291, 1966

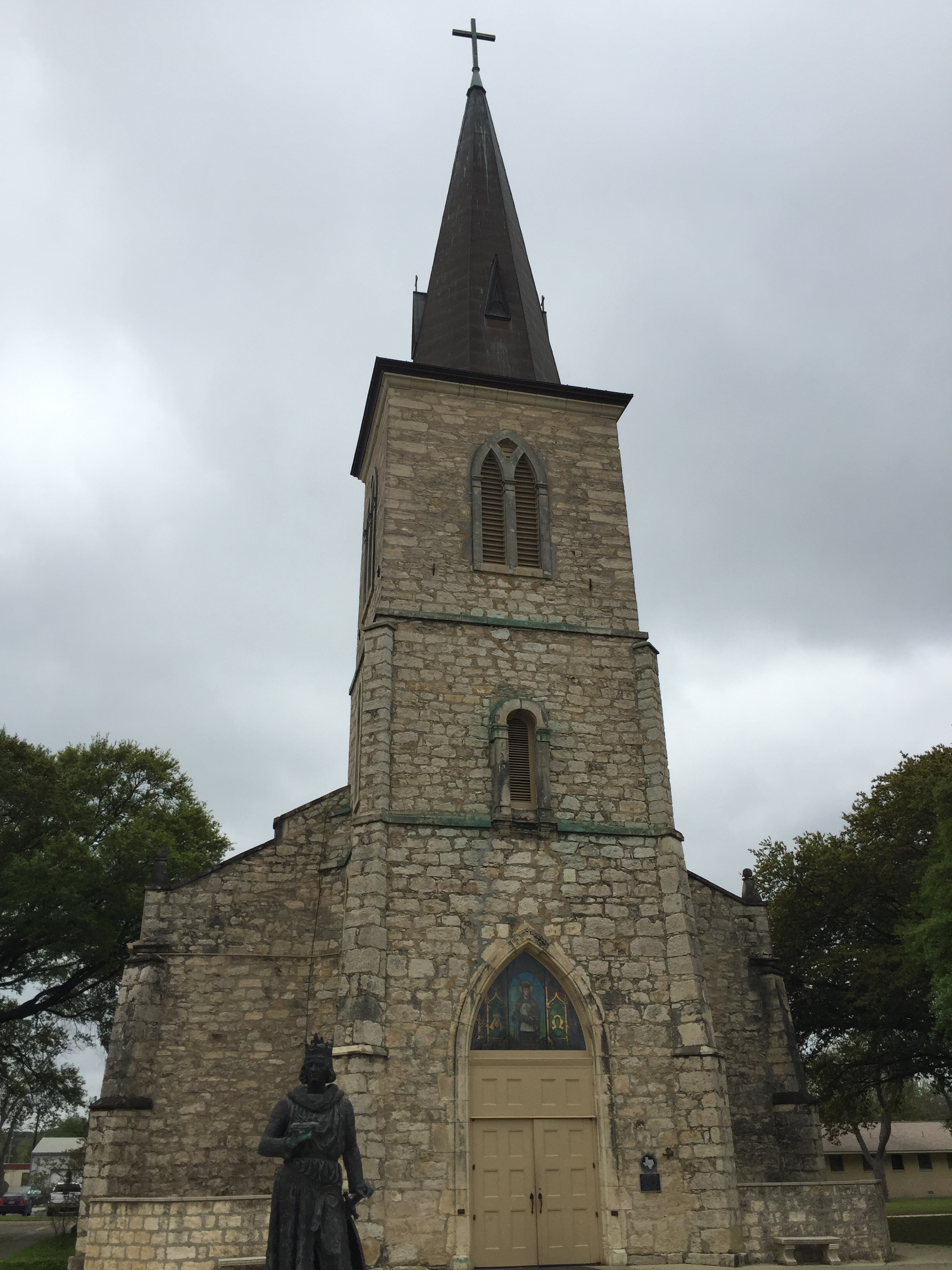
St. Louis Catholic Church (1868–1870); Recorded Texas Historic Landmark #5051, 1970

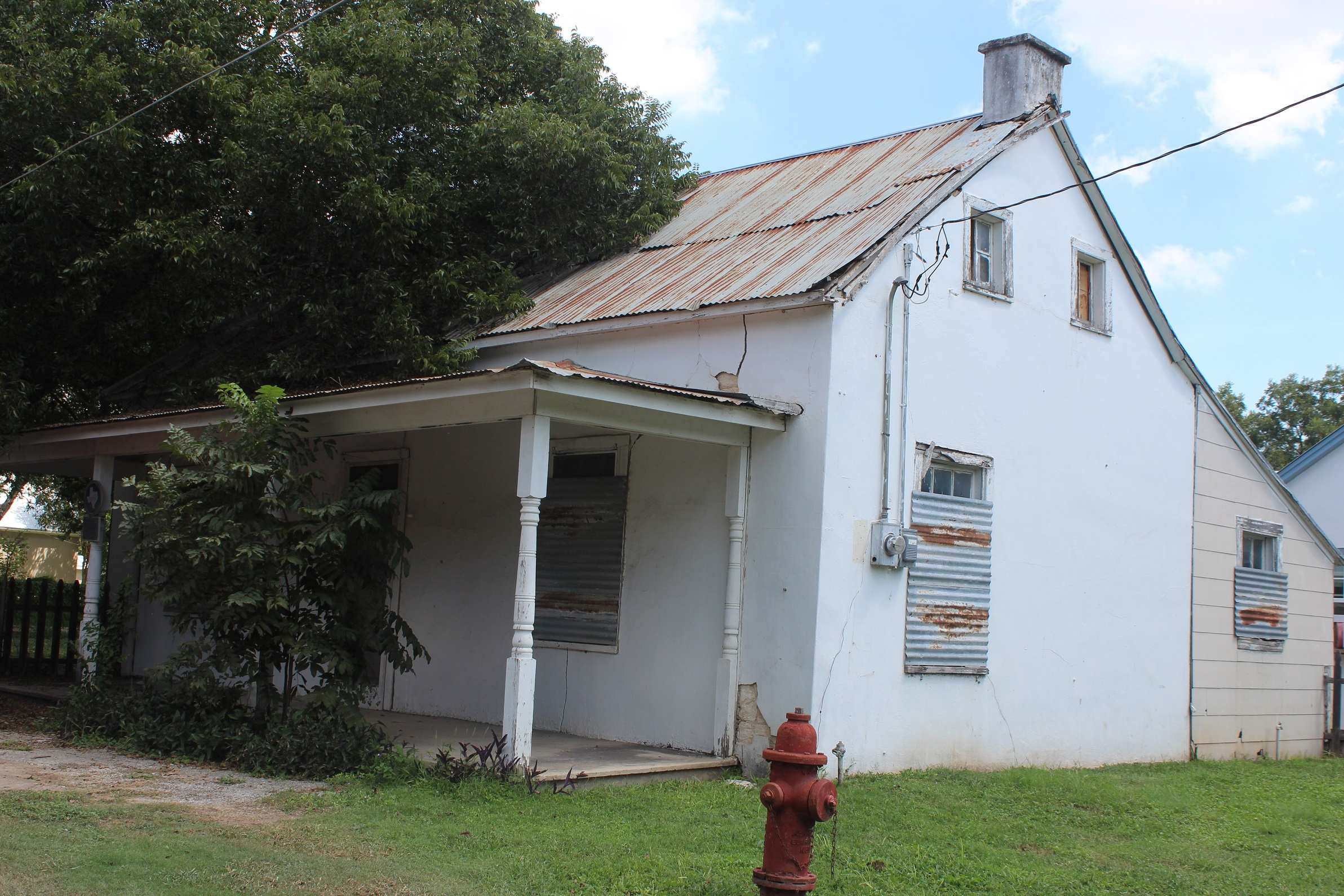
F. Xavier Schmidt House (about 1870); Recorded Texas Historic Landmark #1523, 1966

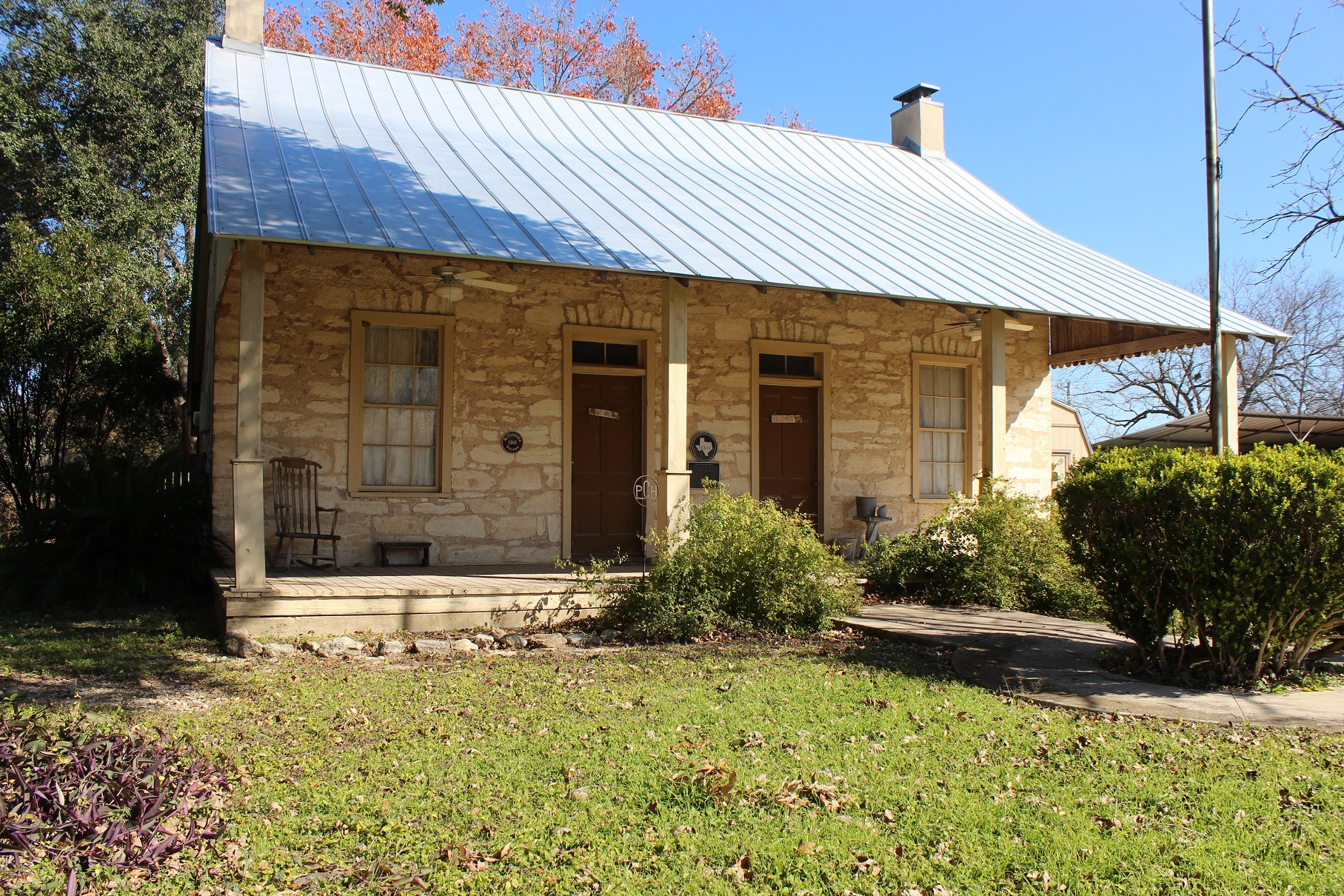
Louis Haller House (about 1877); Recorded Texas Historic Landmark #3135, 1978

== See also ==
- National Register of Historic Places listings in Medina County, Texas
- Recorded Texas Historic Landmarks in Medina County
