= River Oaks Courts =

Historic building in Texas, United States

- U.S. National Register of Historic Places
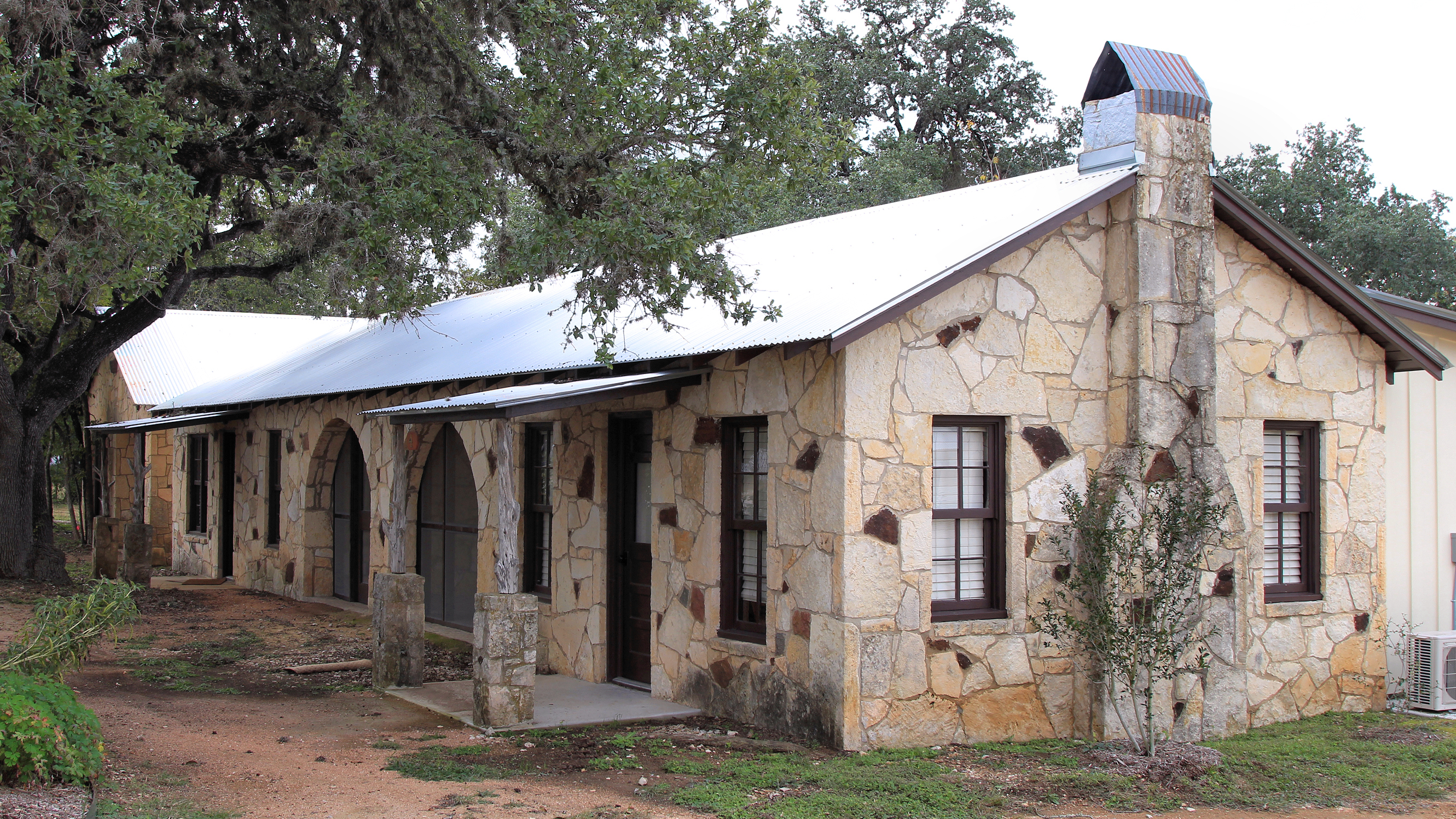
- Cabins 4 & 5

- Location within Texas Location within the United States
- Location: 14349 TX 16, Medina, Texas
- Coordinates: 29.80182°N 99.25386°W
- NRHP reference No.: 100003354
- Added to NRHP: January 28, 2019

The River Oaks Courts, located at 14349 TX 16 in Medina, Texas, United States, were added to the National Register of Historic Places on January 28, 2019.

== See also ==
- National Register of Historic Places listings in Bandera County, Texas
- Medina River Oaks Courts Property website
