= Ascension of Our Lord Catholic Church =

Historic church in Texas, United States

- U.S. National Register of Historic Places
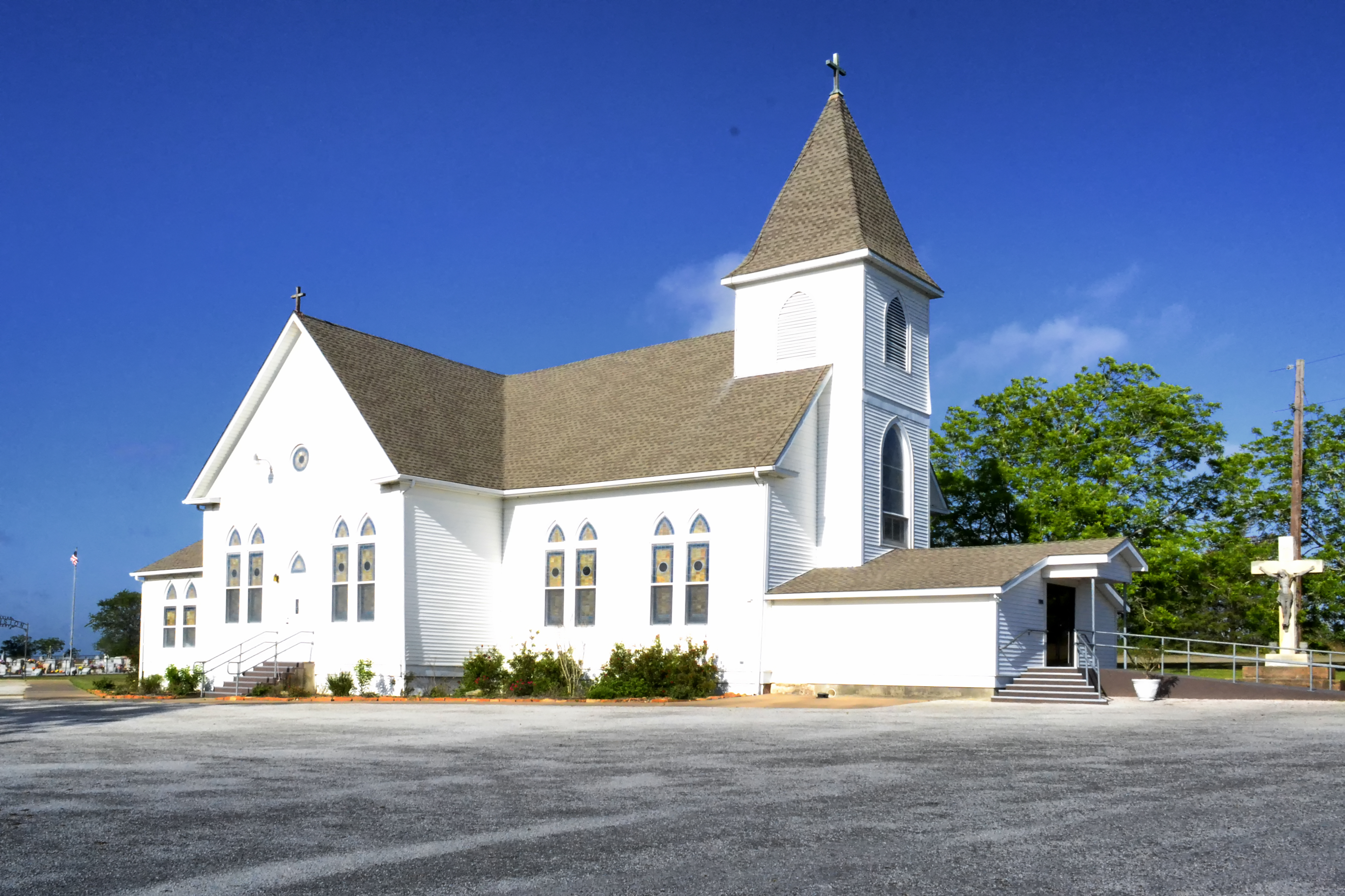
- Ascension Church in 2014

- Location within Texas Location within the United States
- Location: FM 957, Moravia, Texas
- Coordinates: 29°35′3″N 96°59′8″W
- Area: less than one acre
- Built: 1912
- Architect: Koch and Sons
- Architectural style: Late Gothic Revival
- MPS: Churches with Decorative Interior Painting TR
- NRHP reference No.: 83003148
- Added to NRHP: June 21, 1983

Ascension of Our Lord Catholic Church is a historic church on FM 957 in Moravia, Texas.

It was built in 1912 and added to the National Register in 1983.

== See also ==
- National Register of Historic Places listings in Lavaca County, Texas
