= Church of the Immaculate Conception of Blessed Virgin Mary =

Historic church in Texas, United States

- U.S. National Register of Historic Places
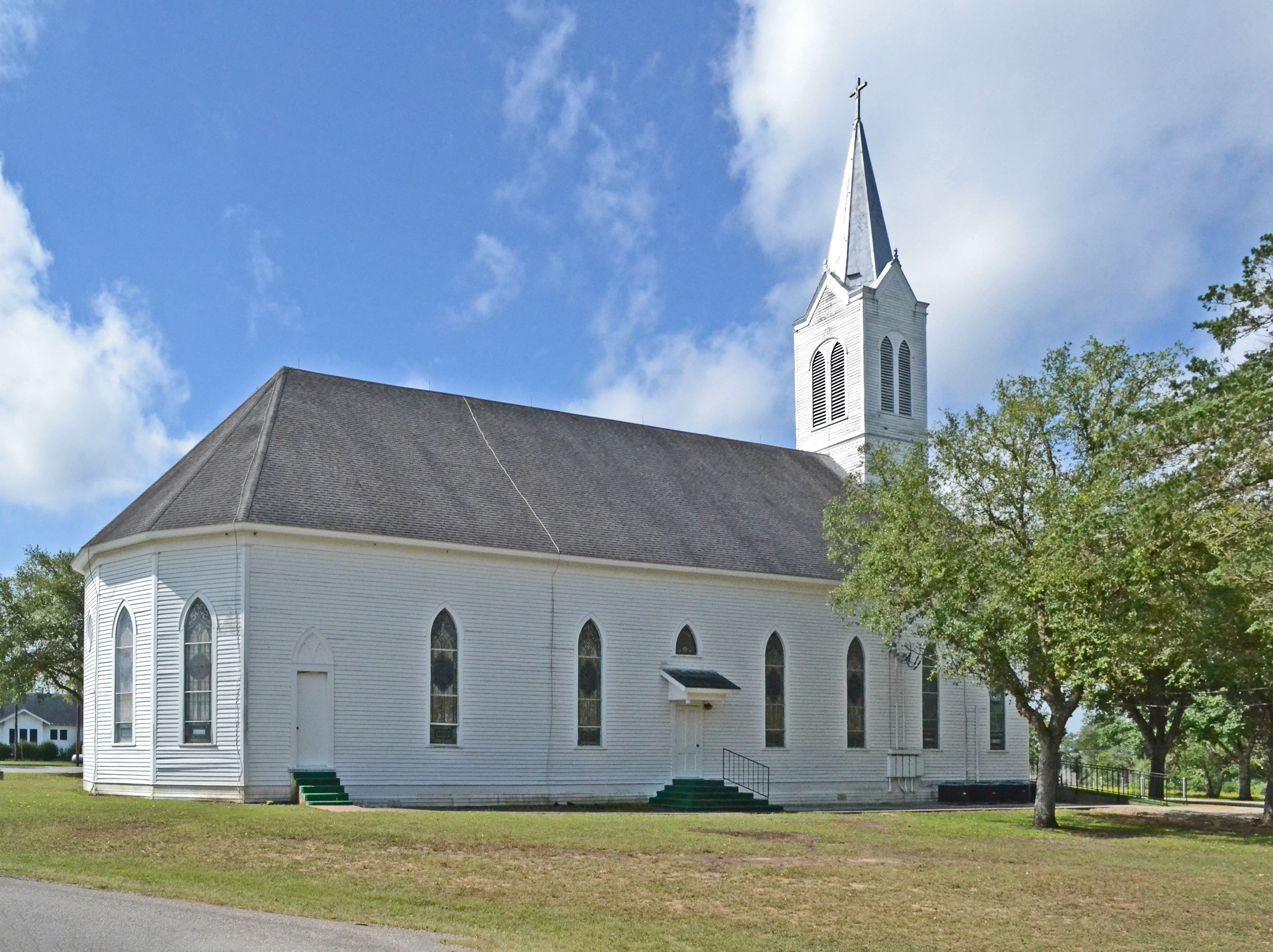
- Immaculate Conception Church in 2014

- Location within Texas Location within the United States
- Location: FM 2672, St. Mary's, Texas
- Coordinates: 29°26′52″N 96°59′49″W
- Area: less than one acre
- Built: 1896
- Architectural style: Late Gothic Revival
- MPS: Churches with Decorative Interior Painting TR
- NRHP reference No.: 83003150
- Added to NRHP: June 21, 1983

Church of the Immaculate Conception of Blessed Virgin Mary is a historic church on FM 2672 in St. Mary's, Texas.

It was built in 1896 and added to the National Register in 1983.

== See also ==
- National Register of Historic Places listings in Lavaca County, Texas
