= National Register of Historic Places listings in Medina County, Texas =

Location of Medina County in Texas

This is a list of the National Register of Historic Places listings in Medina County, Texas.

This is intended to be a complete list of properties and districts listed on the National Register of Historic Places in Medina County, Texas. There are two districts and seven individual properties listed on the National Register in the county. One district includes an individually listed property that is also a State Historic Site, State Antiquities Landmark (SAL), and a Recorded Texas Historic Landmark (RTHL). This district contains several other RTHLs while properties elsewhere in the county include one more SAL and RTHL.

This National Park Service list is complete through NPS recent listings posted March 21, 2025.

== Current listings ==
The locations of National Register properties and districts may be seen in a mapping service provided.

	Name on the Register	Image	Date listed	Location	City or town	Description
1	Castroville Historic District	Castroville Historic District	April 3, 1970 (#70000758)	Roughly bounded by Medina River, SR 471, Gime, Houston, and Constantinople; 29°21′21″N 98°52′45″W	Castroville	Includes State Historic Site, State Antiquities Landmark, and several Recorded Texas Historic Landmarks
2	Dan's Meat Market and Saloon	Dan's Meat Market and Saloon	April 11, 2024 (#100010210)	1303 Lorenzo Street; 29°21′24″N 98°52′42″W	Castroville	
3	D'Hanis Historic District	D'Hanis Historic District	June 24, 1976 (#76002051)	7 mi (11 km). W of Hondo; 29°20′N 99°16′W	D'Hanis	
4	Charles de Montel House	Charles de Montel House	November 25, 1980 (#80004142)	NW of Castroville; 29°22′05″N 98°54′06″W	Castroville	
5	Devine Opera House	Devine Opera House	April 24, 1975 (#75001999)	206 Commercial Dr; 29°08′17″N 98°54′20″W	Devine	
6	Landmark Inn Complex	Landmark Inn Complex	January 7, 1972 (#72001368)	Florella and Florence Sts. 29°21′16″N 98°52′28″W	Castroville	Part of Castroville Historic District; State Historic Site, State Antiquities Landmark, and Recorded Texas Historic Landmark
7	Medina Dam	Medina Dam	March 15, 1976 (#76002050)	N of Castroville on the Medina River; 29°32′25″N 98°56′02″W	Castroville	State Antiquities Landmark
8	Rainbow Theater		December 3, 2024 (#100011087)	410 Paris Street; 29°21′24″N 98°52′40″W	Castroville	
9	Saathoff House		September 9, 1982 (#82004515)	Quihi-Stormhill Rd. 29°23′49″N 99°00′30″W	Quihi	Recorded Texas Historic Landmark

== See also ==
- National Register of Historic Places listings in Texas
- List of Texas State Historic Sites
- Recorded Texas Historic Landmarks in Medina County
