= Gonzales County Courthouse =

- U.S. National Register of Historic Places
- Texas State Antiquities Landmark
- Recorded Texas Historic Landmark
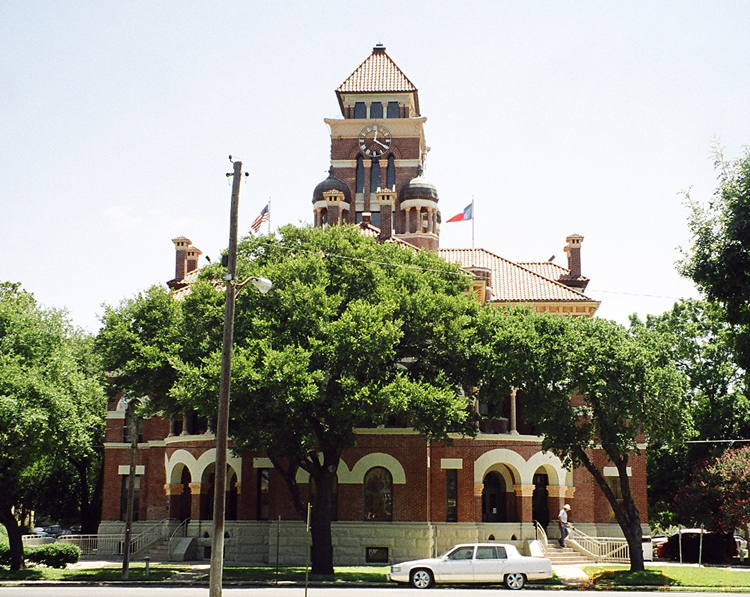
- Gonzales County Courthouse in 2005

- Location within Texas Location within the United States
- Interactive map showing the location of Gonzales County Courthouse
- Location: 414 St. Joseph St., Gonzales, Texas
- Coordinates: 29°30′2″N 97°27′7″W
- Area: 2.7 acres (1.1 ha)
- Built: 1894
- Architect: James Riely Gordon
- Architectural style: Second Empire
- NRHP reference No.: 72001364
- TSAL No.: 8200000293
- RTHL No.: 2219

Significant dates
- Added to NRHP: June 19, 1972
- Designated TSAL: 5/28/1981
- Designated RTHL: 1966

The Gonzales County Courthouse is located in Gonzales, capital of the county of the same name in the U.S. state of Texas. It was designated a Recorded Texas Historic Landmark in 1966 and was added to the National Register of Historic Places in 1972.

It is the second building to serve as the county courthouse. The first burned on December 3, 1893. The current three-story building, designed by J. Riely Gordon in Romanesque Revival style with eclectic details, was built with red brick and a white limestone trim. The brick came from St. Louis, Missouri, while the limestone was cut from a nearby quarry owned by Firmin Maurin, who in 1895 was hired as superintendent for construction of the courthouse. The contract was let on June 26, 1894, and the courthouse was completed on April 8, 1898. The structure cost $64,450. The building was extensively repaired in 1958 including receiving a new roof, and received historic restoration in 1997.

== See also ==
- National Register of Historic Places listings in Gonzales County, Texas
- Recorded Texas Historic Landmarks in Gonzales County
- List of county courthouses in Texas
