= Landmark Inn State Historic Site =

- Landmark Inn Complex
- U.S. National Register of Historic Places
- U.S. Historic district – Contributing property
- Texas State Historic Site
- Texas State Antiquities Landmark
- Recorded Texas Historic Landmark
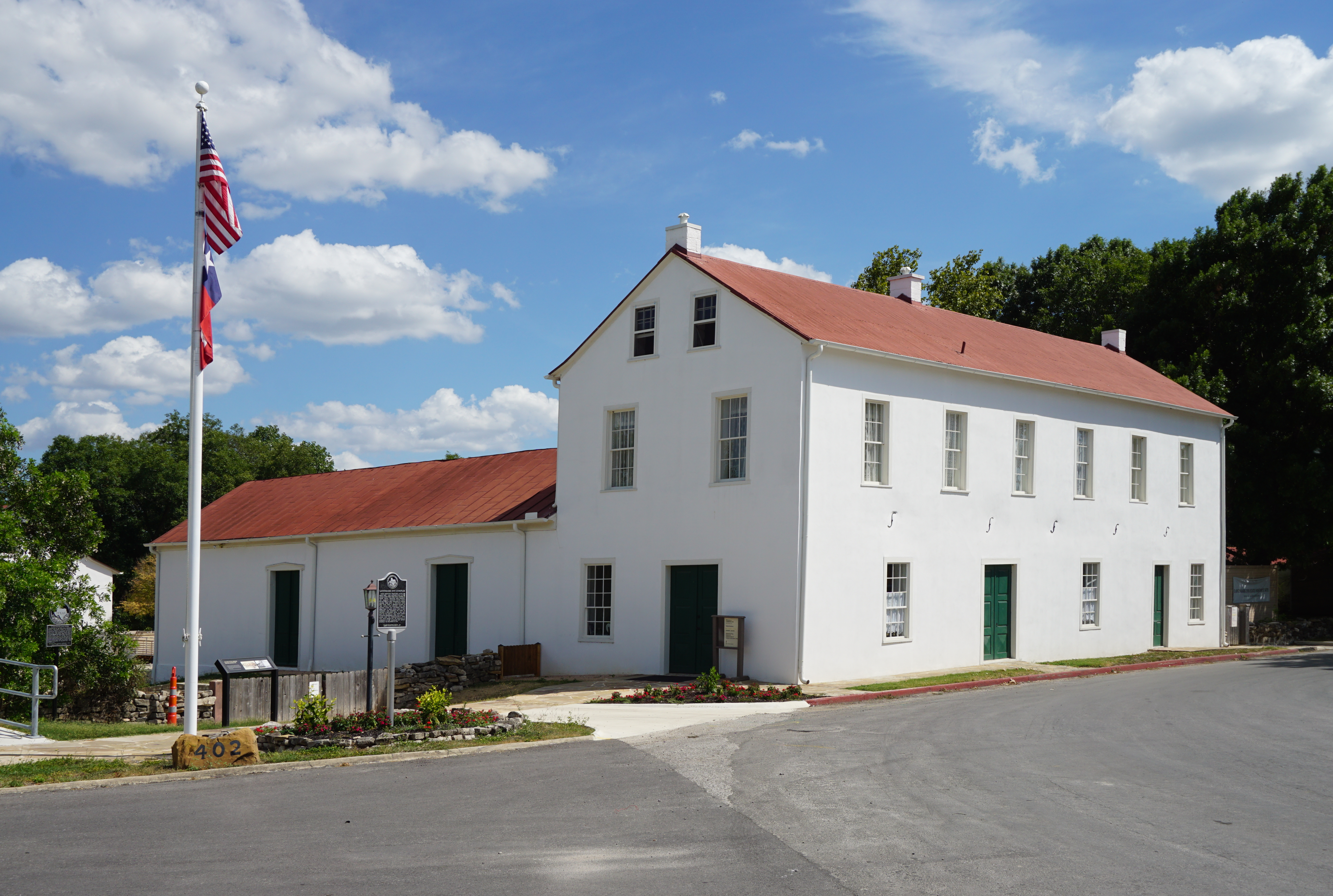
- The Landmark Inn in 2017

- Location within Texas Location within the United States
- Location: Florella and Florence Sts, Castroville, Texas
- Coordinates: 29°21′16″N 98°52′28″W
- Area: 1.5 acres (0.61 ha)
- Built: 1846
- Architect: Caesar Monod, John Vance
- Part of: Castroville Historic District (ID70000758)
- NRHP reference No.: 72001368
- TSAL No.: 470
- RTHL No.: 3031

Significant dates
- Added to NRHP: January 7, 1972
- Designated CP: April 3, 1970
- Designated TSHS: 1981
- Designated TSAL: June 28, 1983
- Designated RTHL: 1965

The Landmark Inn State Historic Site is a historic inn in Castroville, Texas, United States. It serves the general public as both a state historic site and inn eight overnight rooms.

Cesar and Hannah Monod, Swiss immigrants, arrived in Indianola, Texas in the 1830s and settled in Castroville, Texas above a busy crossing on the Medina River in 1849. They constructed a one-story limestone building used as a residence and a general store. They also built a detached commercial kitchen that was the working and living space for their enslaved woman and enslaved infant. In 1850, he bought the adjacent lot with a small house built by immigrants Michel and Rosine Simon in 1847.

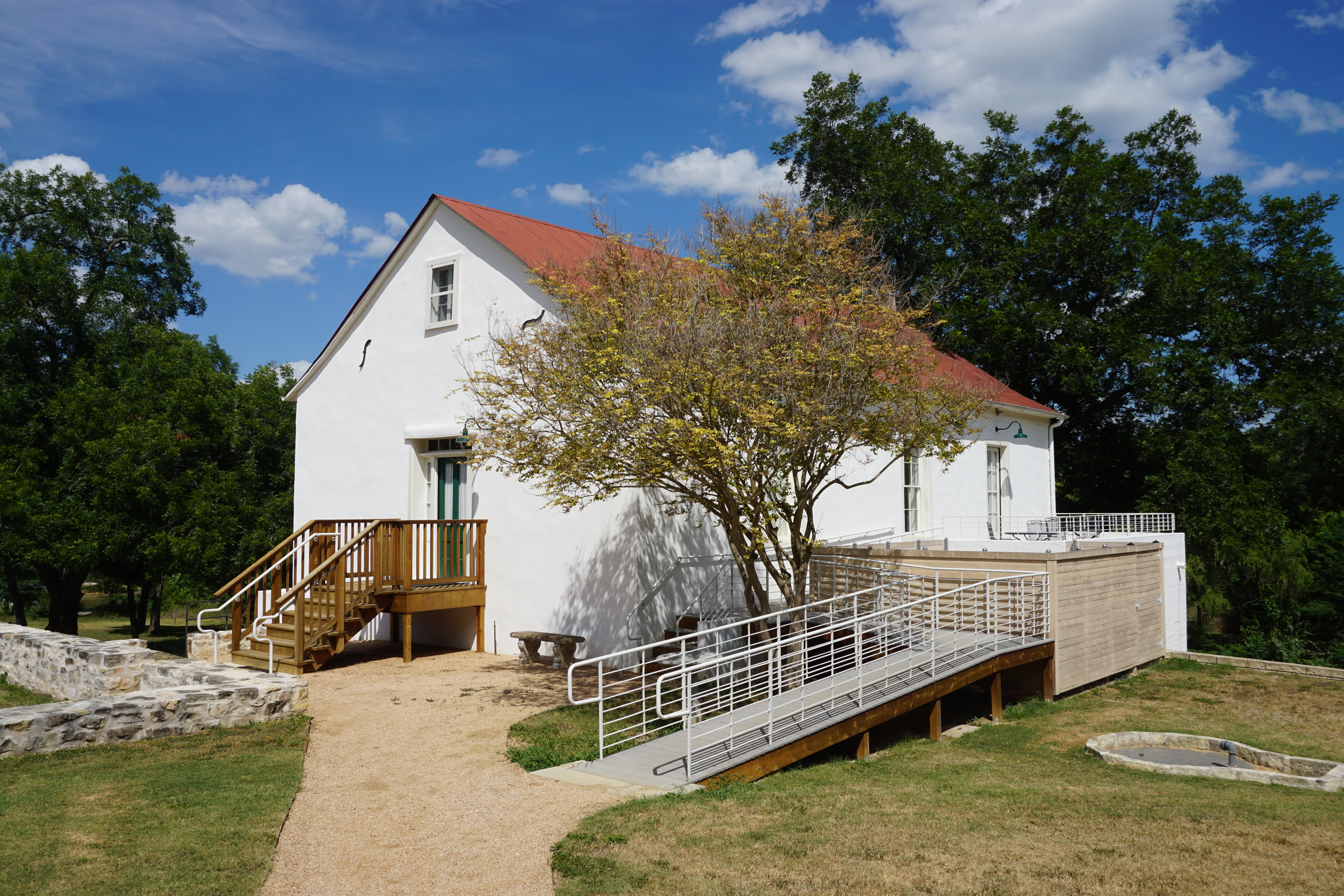
Vance House in 2017

John and Rowena Vance purchased Monod's property in 1853 and added an ell wing to the general store to better serve travelers on the Old San Antonio Road that passed through Castroville on the way west to Eagle Pass, El Paso, and points beyond. In 1859, the Vances added a personal residence, which was the largest in Castroville at the time, and converted Simon's small house into a wash house for use in both bathing and clothes washing. As the town grew and traffic on the road increased after the Civil War, the Vances added a second story to the store building in 1874 to provide rooms for overnight guests.

In 1854, the Vances sold the riverfront portion of his property to George L. Haass and Laurent Quintle, who built a dam on the river and constructed a water-powered grist mill to process grain and gin cotton for local farmers. Joseph and Margarethe Courand, immigrants to Texas from Alsace, bought the mill in 1876 and made substantial improvements to it before his death three years later. When Joseph Jr. and Julia Courand took over from his parents, the mill was processing lumber, cotton, wheat, and over a million bushels of corn per year starting in the 1880s. The mill was the industrial center of Castroville until the 1920s.

The Courands bought the Vance property in 1899 from John and Rowena's children and converted the 1859 Vance residence into a warehouse. The Vance Hotel was rented periodically but was otherwise not maintained as it had been in the past. The Courands moved to San Antonio in 1903 but continued to manage the property and a separate general store on the town square in Castroville.

Not willing to update technology in the early 1920s, the Courands posted the entire property for sale. Jordan T. Lawler bought the Courand property in 1925 and converted the mill to a hydroelectric plant to provide Castroville with electricity for the first time. In 1927, the Lawler siblings Jordan (1879-1970), Henry (1881-1967), and Ruth (1900-1990), along with their mother Carrie and Henry's family relocated to Castroville. Another sister, C. Genevieve Lawler (1891-1976), relocated in 1952 to Castroville with her partner Mary Ruth Lionberger (1900-1987). The historic hotel re-opened as the Landmark Inn on July 4, 1942, primarily serving military personnel between the air bases in San Antonio and Hondo. Ruth Lawler had the property designated a Recorded Texas Historic Landmark in 1965 and designated as a contributing property in the surrounding Castroville Historic District in 1970. It was added to the National Register of Historic Places in its own right in 1972.

== State Historic Site ==
In 1974, the property was donated to the Texas Parks and Wildlife Department (TPWD), which conducted extensive archaeological investigations and made significant repairs and improvements before opening the property to the public as a state historic site on October 25, 1981. TPWD also had the property designated as a Texas State Antiquities Landmark in 1983. On January 1, 2008, the site was transferred from TPWD to the Texas Historical Commission, which completed a two-year renovation and historic preservation project in December 2015. Tours, programs, and special events are offered regularly for visitors to the site. A new museum exhibit was installed in April 2017. Preservation Texas and the San Antonio Conservation Society were recognized with awards in 2018 for the historic preservation work accomplished.

== Hotel ==
In addition to serving as a state historic site, the Landmark Inn is also a hotel with eight rooms or overnight stays. The guest rooms are furnished with antiques and historical reproductions that are representative of the 1850s, 1880s, and 1920s, depending on the room. While the rooms have furnishings that reinforce the historical interpretation of the site, they also have modern conveniences, such as electricity, indoor plumbing, and climate control systems. Televisions and radios are not provided but free Wi-Fi is available.

== See also ==
- National Register of Historic Places listings in Medina County, Texas
- List of Texas state historic sites
- Recorded Texas Historic Landmarks in Medina County
