= Lay-Bozka House =

- U.S. National Register of Historic Places
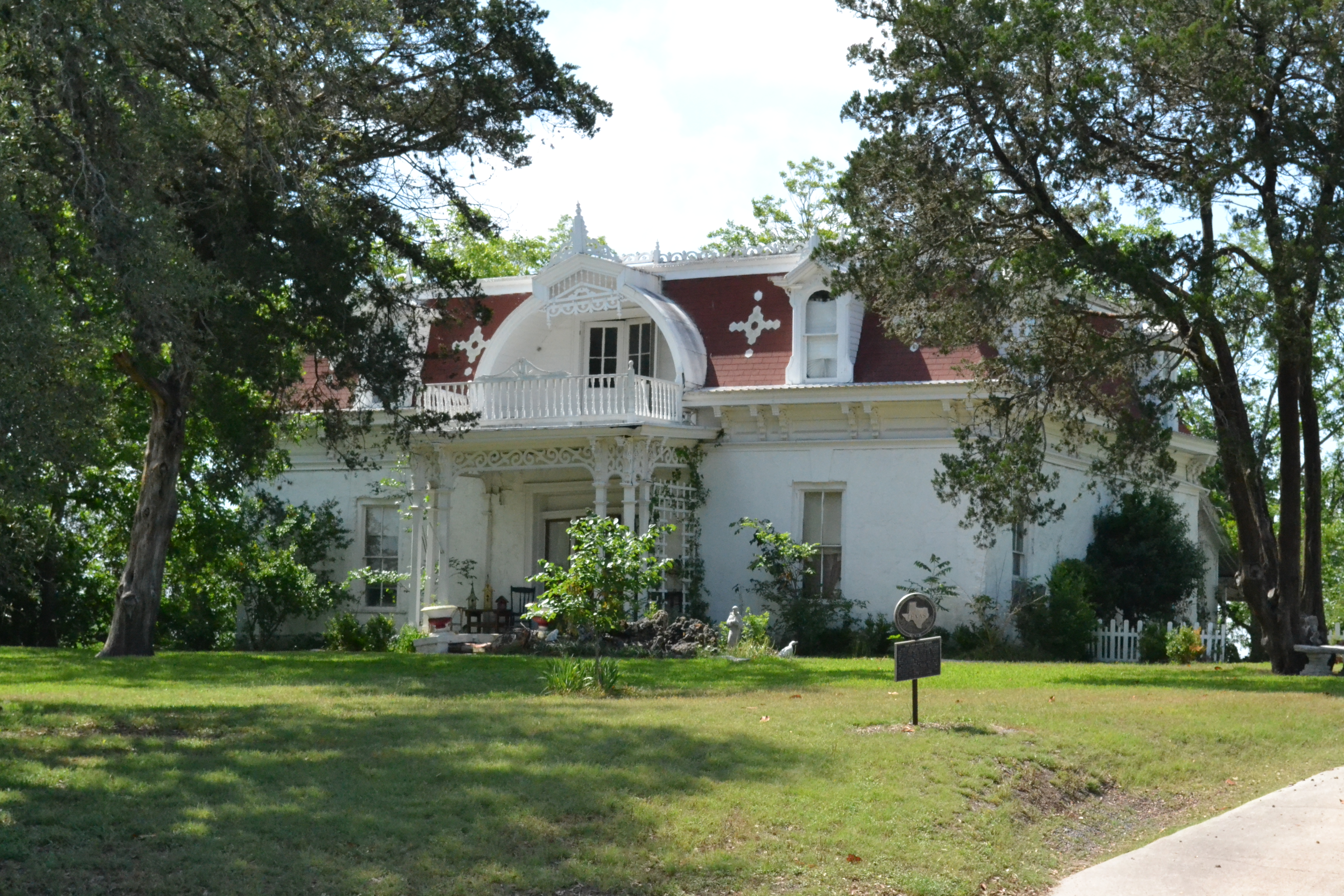
- Location: 205 Fairwinds, Hallettsville, Texas
- Coordinates: 29°26′31″N 96°56′50″W
- Area: 2 acres (0.81 ha)
- Built: 1878-82
- Built by: Dietz, B.J.E.
- Architect: Hugo, Victor
- NRHP reference No.: 71000946
- Added to NRHP: January 25, 1971

The Lay-Bozka House, at 205 Fairwinds in Hallettsville, Texas, was built during 1878–82. It was listed on the National Register of Historic Places in 1971.

It is a two-story house with the second floor highlighted by a red mansard roof. Its NRHP nomination describes: "The Lay-Bozka House in Hallettsville, Texas, with its bright red and white roof, is of a type that is quite rare now, in part because so many of the original patterned shingle mansard roofs have been replaced. This was always a very colorful example. The house has a frosting of white wooden rope moldings and finials cresting the roof and the dormers, and there is Carpenter's Lace and bead and spindle work on the front porch and the fanciful canopy above it."

It was the home of James Lay, a doctor who happened to have as a patient a French agent named Victor Hugo (unrelated to the famous French writer), when Hugo was visiting Hallettsville. Hugo was unable to pay for the medical care by normal means, and provided a design for the house instead. The house was built by B.J.E. Dietz.

It is a Recorded Texas Historic Landmark.
