= Cuero I Archeological District =

- U.S. National Register of Historic Places
- Nearest city: Cuero, Texas
- Area: 57,000 acres (230 km^{2})
- Architect: Hoch, Valentine
- Architectural style: Greek Revival
- NRHP reference No.: 74002271
- Added to NRHP: October 9, 1974

The Cuero I Archeological District, in the vicinity of Cuero, Texas, is a 57,000 acres (230 km^{2}) historic district which was listed on the National Register of Historic Places in 1974. It includes parts of DeWitt County, Texas and Gonzales County, Texas.

The listing includes three contributing buildings and 10 contributing sites. It has some representation of Greek Revival architecture and some association with a Valentine Hoch.

It was listed for its information potential of its archeological sites and also for its association with historic events.

The Valentine Hoch House, a two-and-a-half-story stone house in DeWitt County, was documented by the Historic American Buildings Survey. It was built by German immigrant stonemason Valentine Hoch during 1856–57. Its stone was quarried near the Guadalupe River.
