= Church of the Blessed Virgin Mary, the Queen of Peace =

Historic church in Texas, United States

- U.S. National Register of Historic Places
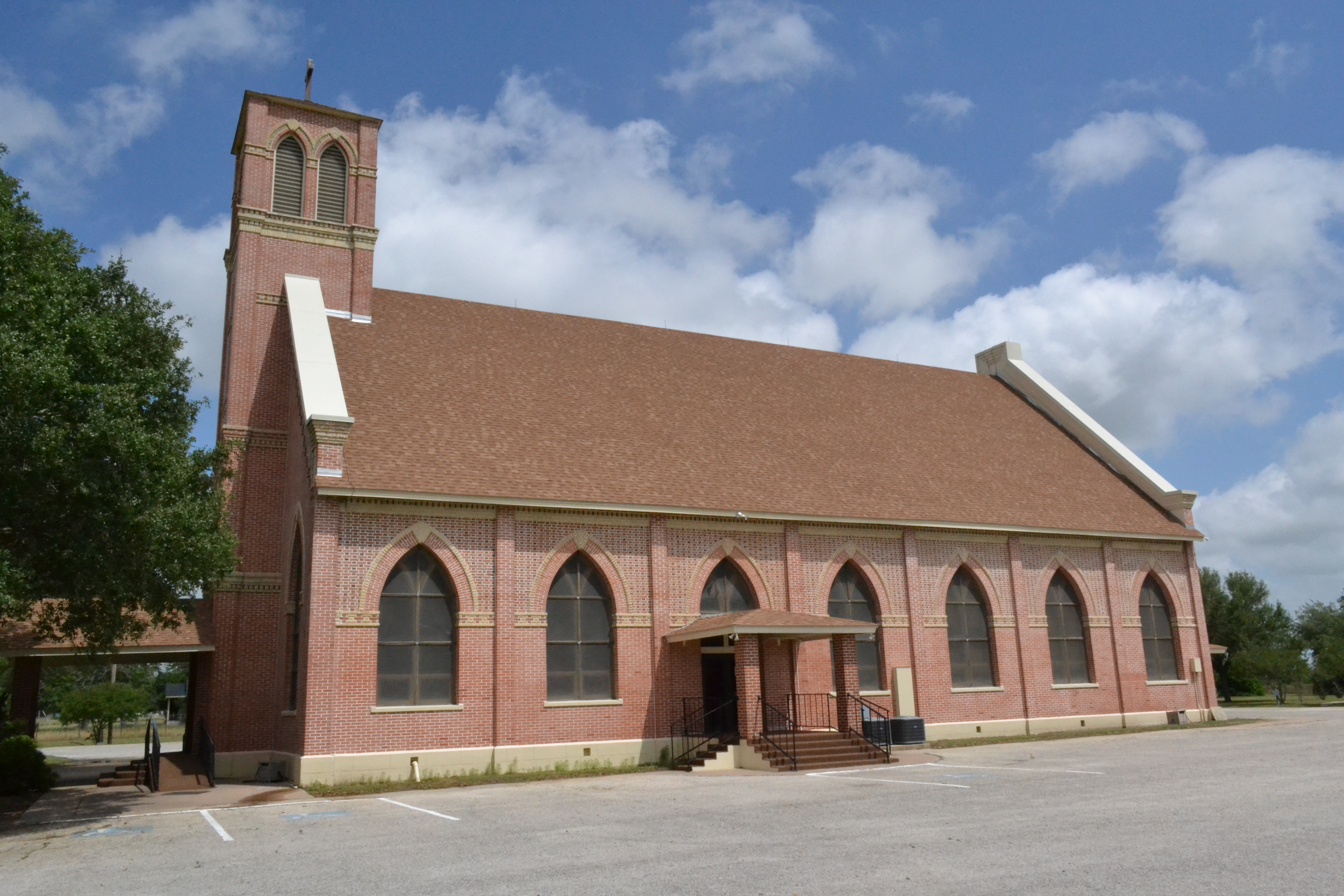
- Church of the Blessed Virgin Mary, the Queen of Peace in 2014

- Location within Texas Location within the United States
- Location: FM 340, Sweet Home, Texas
- Coordinates: 29°20′32″N 97°4′8″W
- Area: less than one acre
- Built: 1918
- Built by: Vincent Falbo, M. Deodati
- Architectural style: Gothic Revival
- MPS: Churches with Decorative Interior Painting TR
- NRHP reference No.: 83003149
- Added to NRHP: 21 June 1983

Church of the Blessed Virgin Mary, the Queen of Peace is a historic Roman Catholic church on FM 340 in Sweet Home, Texas. It is dedicated to Blessed Virgin Mary, the Queen of Peace.

It was built in 1918 and added to the National Register in 1983.

== See also ==
- National Register of Historic Places listings in Lavaca County, Texas
