= Jureczki House =

- U.S. National Register of Historic Places
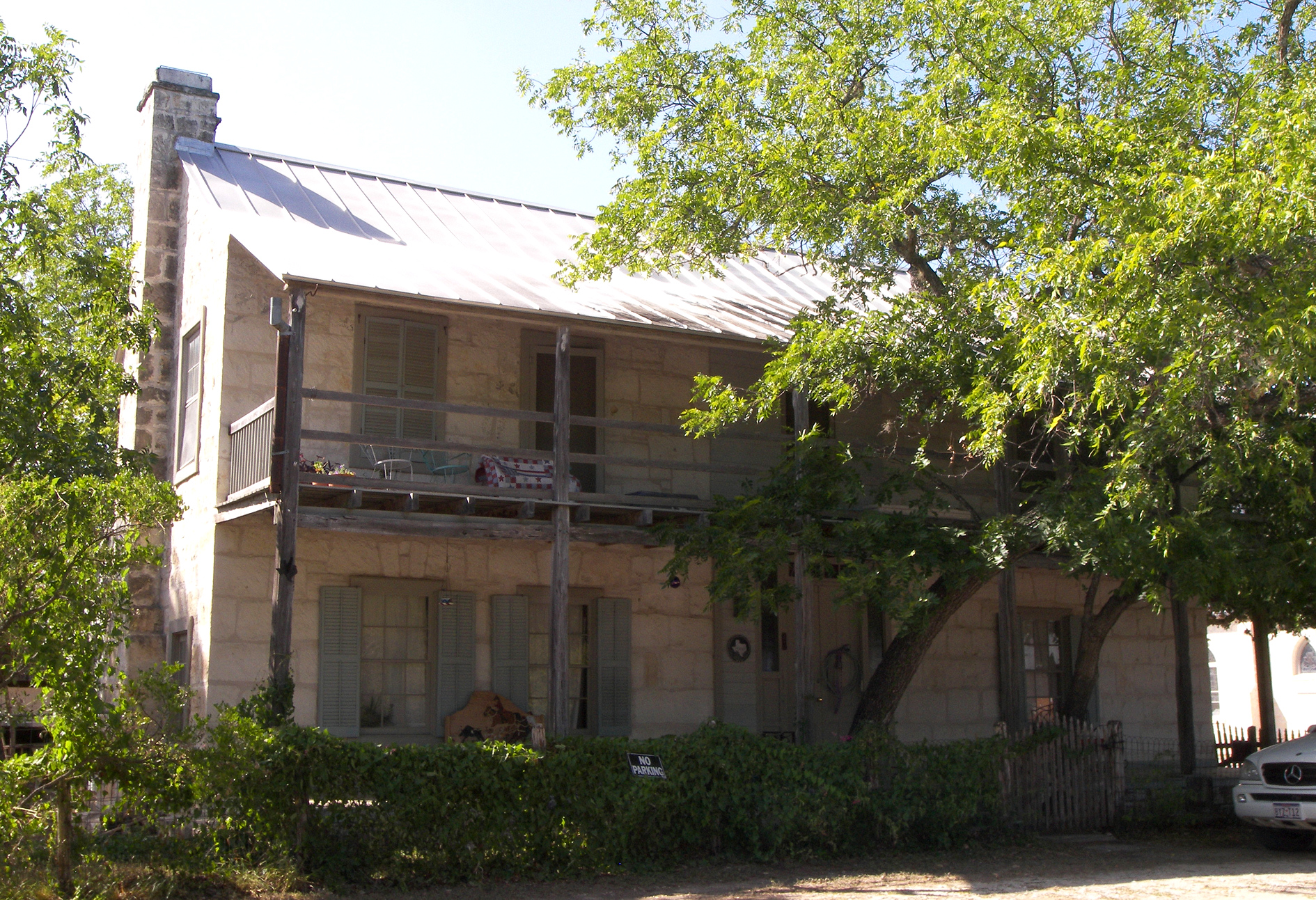

- Location within Texas
- Location: 607 Cypress St., Bandera, Texas
- Coordinates: 29°43′13″N 99°04′31″W
- Area: less than one acre
- Built: 1876
- Architectural style: Polish pioneer
- NRHP reference No.: 80004075
- Added to NRHP: January 11, 1980

The Jureczki House, at 607 Cypress St. in Bandera, Texas, was built in 1876. It was listed on the National Register of Historic Places in 1980.

It is a two-story plastered stone house which is one of the largest Polish pioneer houses in central Texas.
