= New Wehdem, Texas =

- Unincorporated community
- Location within Texas Location within the United States
- Coordinates: 30.0724422°N 96.3460767°W
- Country: United States
- State: Texas
- County: Austin
- Elevation: 377 ft (115 m)
- Time zone: UTC-6 (Central (CST))
  - Summer (DST): UTC-5 (CDT)
- Area code: 979
- GNIS feature ID: 2034862

New Wehdem is an unincorporated community in Austin County, in the U.S. state of Texas. According to the Handbook of Texas, the community had a population of 100 in 2000. It is located within the Greater Houston metropolitan area.

== Geography ==
New Wehdem is located just off Texas State Highway 36, 8 mi (13 km) northwest of Bellville, 23 mi (37 km) north of Sealy and 11 mi (18 km) south of Brenham in northern Austin County.

== Education ==
New Wehdem is served by the Bellville Independent School District.
