= Post Oak Point, Texas =

- Unincorporated community
- Location within Texas Location within the United States
- Coordinates: 29.9288365°N 96.5260822°W
- Country: United States
- State: Texas
- County: Austin
- Elevation: 381 ft (116 m)
- Time zone: UTC-6 (Central (CST))
  - Summer (DST): UTC-5 (CDT)
- Area code: 979
- GNIS feature ID: 1365661

Post Oak Point is an unincorporated community in Austin County, in the U.S. state of Texas. According to the Handbook of Texas, the community had a population of 40 in 2000. It is located within the Greater Houston metropolitan area.

== Geography ==
Post Oak Point is located along the banks of the San Bernard River tributary of Post Oak Point Creek, 3 mi (4.8 km) south of Industry in far western Austin County, near the Colorado County line.

== Education ==
A school was located near Post Oak Point sometime before the 20th century. Today, the community is served by the Bellville Independent School District.
