= Cochran, Texas =

- Unincorporated community
- Location within Texas Location within the United States
- Coordinates: 30.0288326°N 96.1294045°W
- Country: United States
- State: Texas
- County: Austin
- Elevation: 187 ft (57 m)
- Time zone: UTC-6 (Central (CST))
  - Summer (DST): UTC-5 (CDT)
- Area code: 979
- GNIS feature ID: 1333046

Cochran is an unincorporated community in Austin County, in the U.S. state of Texas. According to the Handbook of Texas, its population was 116 in 2000. It is located within the Greater Houston metropolitan area. Cochran County was formed on August 21, 1876, from lands originally assigned to Bexar and Young counties, and it was named after Robert Cochran who died in the Alamo.

== Geography ==
Cochran is located on Texas State Highway 159 at the edge of the Raccoon Bend oilfield, 9 mi (14 km) northeast of Bellville in far northeastern Austin County. Situated in the southern High Plains, Cochran County shares borders with New Mexico to the west, Bailey County to the north, Hockley County to the east, and Yoakum County to the south.

== Education ==
Cochran had its own school in 1918. Today, the community is served by the Bellville Independent School District.
