= Shelby, Texas =

Shelby
- Unincorporated community
- Location within the state of Texas Shelby (the United States)
- Coordinates: 30°01′18″N 96°35′54″W
- Country: United States
- State: Texas
- County: Austin
- Time zone: UTC-6 (Central (CST))
  - Summer (DST): UTC-5 (CDT)

Shelby is an unincorporated community in Austin County, Texas, United States. According to the Handbook of Texas, the community had a population of 175 in 2000. It is located within the Texas German belt region, a region stretching from Sealy in the east to Fredericksburg in the west, settled by German emigrants. To this day, Austin County has a large German Texan population and many people still speak German.

== Geography ==
Shelby is located at the FM 389 and FM 1457 crossroads in far northwest Austin County. The community is 7.3 miles (11.7 km) northwest of Industry via State Highway 159 and FM 1457. Round Top is 8.0 miles (12.9 km) northwest on FM 1457. Brenham is 17.1 miles (27.5 km) to the northeast on FM 389. Harmonie Hall and the Shelby Volunteer Fire Department are located a short distance to the southwest on FM 389, while the town cemetery can be found a few hundred yards to the south at FM 1457 and Voelkel Road. It is also located 24 mi (39 km) northwest of Bellville.

== History ==
Otto von Roeder was the first settler in Shelby in 1841. The community was named for David Shelby, one of The Old Three Hundred under Stephen F. Austin. Shelby would become the home of many Adelsverein colonists in 1845, but it was founded a year before that organization was formed in Germany, and three years before the Adelsverein sent its first colonists to Texas. Von Roeder had emigrated to Texas from Westphalia in the 1830s and was not affiliated with the Adelsverein's colonization efforts and established a grain mill in 1841. Because many of the German settlers spoke Latin, it is believed to be part of the Latin Settlement communities populated in Texas at that time.

The community became known as Rödersmühl or Röders Mill. August Vogelsang then bought the mill in 1845 and several German families surnamed Vanderwerth, Rothermel, and Ohlendorf immigrated to the area. A post office was established at Shelby in 1846 and remained in operation until 1912. A singing society was founded in the community in 1852. It expanded in 1867 that attracted other German singing groups throughout the state and was named in honor of Prussian soldiers who died during the Seven Weeks War. It had 75 residents in 1884, and its businesses included three saloons, three general stores, two cotton gins, a blacksmith and a saddlemaker. A Lutheran church was then built in the community in the 1880s, followed by a hotel in 1896. Its population grew to 248 in 1904. It dropped to 200 and remained at that level throughout World War II. This caused further population loss in the community and the closure of several businesses. Its population was reported as 175 in 1992 through 2000. An agricultural society and a band were founded in the community. A tombstone of Vogelsang and his family is in the community cemetery.

== Education ==
The community's first school was established in 1854. It had two schools by 1884. Most of its first settlers were from well-educated, middle-class families promoting the arts and sciences. Today, the community is served by the Bellville Independent School District.
