= Thomas B. Bell =

Thomas Bell
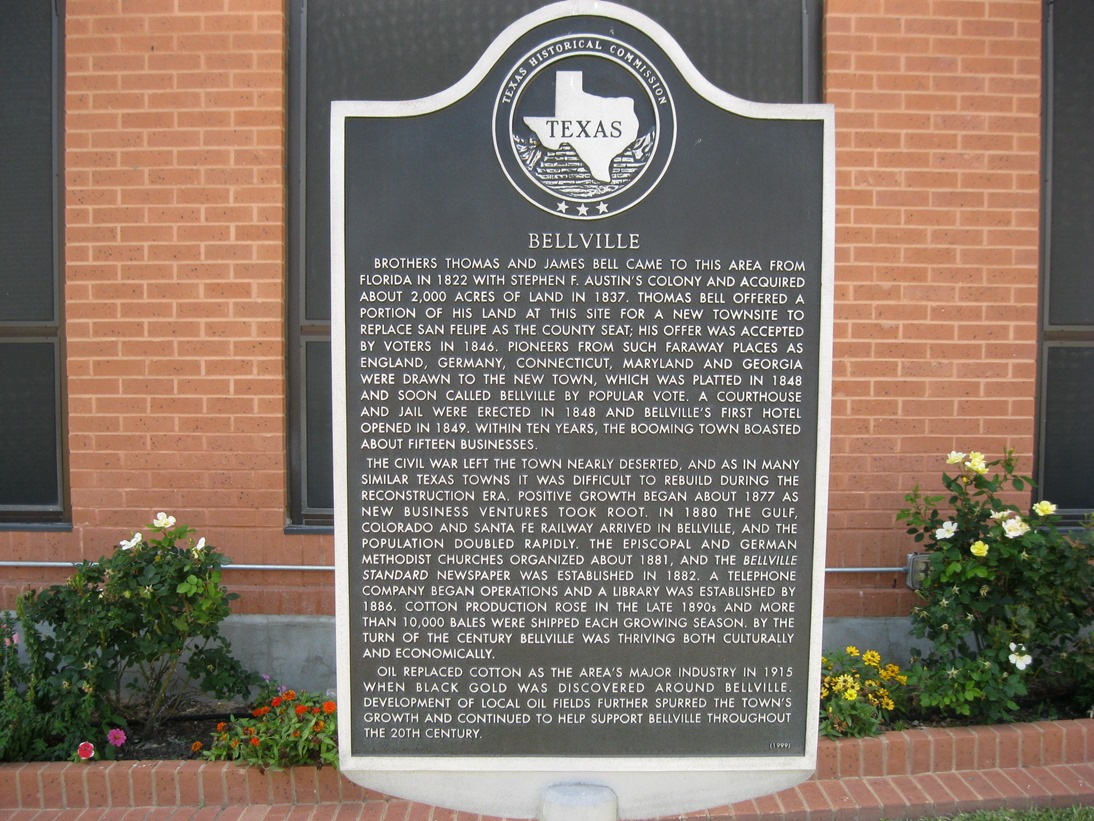
- Texas state historical marker at Bellville city hall
- Born: 1796-1802; North Carolina
- Died: 1858; Bellville, Texas
- Spouse: Abigail Grimes
- Children: adopted son John G. Slade (Bell)

Thomas Bell was one of Stephen F. Austin's colonists, having moved to Texas in 1824 although one record has him entering the colony as early as 1822. He was a soldier during the Texas Revolution and received a bounty of land for participating in the Siege of Bexar. He and his brother James Bell later donated the land upon which the town of Bellville, Texas was built. His will was probated in Austin County, Texas.

== Texian settler ==
In 1822, Thomas Bell moved to Texas from Florida with his brother James Bell. A different Thomas Bell is recorded on 16 August 1824, Felipe Enrique Neri, Baron de Bastrop granted Bell title to a league of land in what is now Brazoria County. This Thomas Bell can be traced until his death living on the grant of land in Brazoria, Texas until his death in 1849. His estate partition lists his surviving widow as Nancy M. Bell who received 1/2 of his estate. The remainder was divided in 1/10 increments to: Toila Bell, Laura D. Hinkle, Willis C. Bell, Emily A Bell and Christopher E. Bell. As head of a committee in Cedar Lake, a Thomas Bell corresponded with Austin on how to deal with the Karankawa Indians in October 1825. The census of 1825 recorded that a Thomas Bell was married with three children and made a living farming and raising livestock. A legal document from 1829 noted that his wife's name was Prudencio and his place of habitation as Austin Municipality. Noah Smithwick was a guest at Bell's pole cabin on the San Bernard River in 1835. A Thomas Bell served in Captain John York's volunteer company from September to December 1835, including the Siege of Béxar. Thomas Bell of Bellville is noted in his obituary as having been with Ben Milam in the Siege of Bexar. A Thomas Bell was the flag bearer at the Battle of Concepción in October 1835. Thomas Bell was on a committee that helped write the Goliad Declaration of Independence in December 1835.

== Texas independence ==
Thomas Bell received 2,000 acres of land from the Republic of Texas in 1837. It is known that a Thomas Bell was living with his family in Austin County in 1844. Since a new county seat to replace San Felipe was desired, he along with his brother James Bell donated the land on which Bellville was founded in 1846. The town grew rapidly. A courthouse and jail were constructed in 1848 and a hotel the following year. Bell later obtained a certificate for 640 acres in Archer County in north Texas. In 1857 he received an additional 320 acres in the same county. There is much confusion between these two Thomas Bells as they both arrived in Austin's Colony in the early years. Both Thomas Bells received leagues of land. Both Thomas Bells are recorded in Austin's earliest accounting.

The Thomas Bell of Bellville along with his brother-in-law Benjamin Granville donated land to the Methodist Church on Piney Creek. It is apparent that the younger Thomas lived in Bellville most of his life while the other Thomas Bell lived in Columbia in Brazoria County until his death in 1849.
