= Wehdem, Texas =

- Unincorporated community
- Location within Texas Location within the United States
- Coordinates: 30.0713311°N 96.3877446°W
- Country: United States
- State: Texas
- County: Austin
- Elevation: 331 ft (101 m)
- Time zone: UTC-6 (Central (CST))
  - Summer (DST): UTC-5 (CDT)
- Area code: 979
- GNIS feature ID: 1379250

Wehdem is an unincorporated community in Austin County, in the U.S. state of Texas. It is located within the Greater Houston metropolitan area.

== Geography ==
Wehdem is located on the banks of Buffalo Creek, 11 mi (18 km) northwest of Bellville in extreme-northern Austin County near the Washington County line.

== Education ==
Wehdem had its own school in the 1930s. Today, the community is served by the Bellville Independent School District.
