= Millheim, Texas =

- Unincorporated community
- Location within Texas Location within the United States
- Coordinates: 29.8718954°N 96.2482970°W
- Country: United States
- State: Texas
- County: Austin
- Elevation: 236 ft (72 m)
- Time zone: UTC-6 (Central (CST))
  - Summer (DST): UTC-5 (CDT)
- Area code: 979
- GNIS feature ID: 1378684

Millheim is an unincorporated community in Austin County, in the U.S. state of Texas. According to the Handbook of Texas, its population was 150 in 2000. It is located within the Greater Houston metropolitan area.

== Geography ==
Millheim is located 8 mi (13 km) south of Bellville, 27 mi (43 km) south of Brenham, 5 mi (8.0 km) west of Cat Spring and 8 mi (13 km) northwest of Sealy in central Austin County.

== Education ==
Millheim's first school held German-language classes and started sometime in the 1850s. Today, the community is served by the Bellville Independent School District.
