= Kenney, Texas =

Kenney
- Unincorporated community
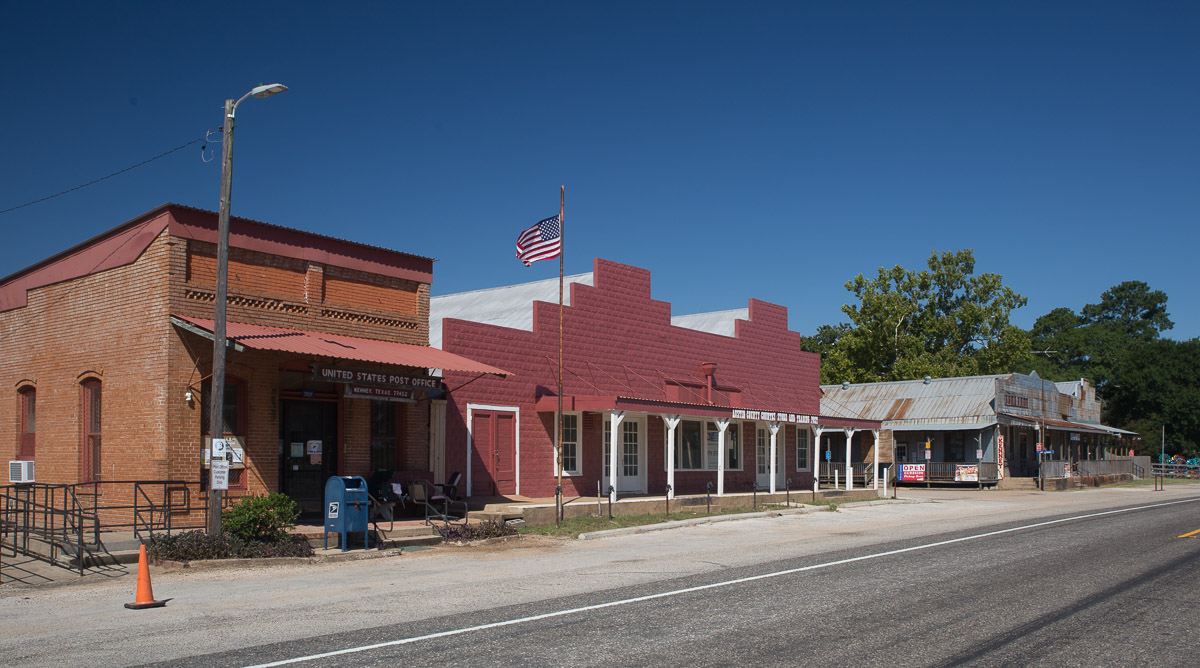
- Kenney in 2020

- Location within the state of Texas Kenney (the United States)
- Coordinates: 30°2′52″N 96°19′37″W
- Country: United States
- State: Texas
- County: Austin
- Elevation: 390 ft (120 m)
- Time zone: UTC-6 (Central (CST))
  - Summer (DST): UTC-5 (CDT)
- ZIP codes: 77452
- GNIS feature ID: 1339040

Kenney (also Kinney) is an unincorporated community in northern Austin County, Texas, United States. According to the Handbook of Texas, the community had a population of 200 in 2000. It is located within the Greater Houston metropolitan area.

== History ==
The area around Kenney was first settled in the 1820s, with German immigrants arriving from the 1830s through 1900, but the community itself was not started until 1880, when a station on the Gulf, Colorado and Santa Fe Railway between Brenham and Bellville and a post office was established. The community was originally named Thompson for its first postmaster, JE Thompson. After four years under that name, the community was renamed Kenneyville in 1884, in honor of evangelist John Wesley Kenney; the name was shortened to Kenney in 1892. The community thrived in 1885 with a steam-powered gristmill and cotton gin, three churches, several businesses, and 150 residents. Its population shrank to 75 in 1890. The community's first hotel was established by William Schill and a general store was managed by John Chernosky. Its population rose to 202 in 1904. The American Red Cross organized a chapter here in 1917 and included 76 black residents on its 178-member roster. It lost two people in 1936, but had 12 businesses in operation. It had a church in the late 1980s. Its population remained at 200 from 1990 through 2000.

Although Kenney is unincorporated, it has a post office, with the ZIP code of 77452.

== Geography ==
Kenney is located at the intersection of Farm to Market Road 2754 and Texas State Highway 36 on the Atchison, Topeka and Santa Fe Railway, 8 mi (13 km) north of Bellville and 11 mi (18 km) south of Brenham in far northern Austin County.

=== Climate ===
The climate in this area is characterized by relatively high temperatures and evenly distributed precipitation throughout the year. The Köppen Climate System describes the weather as humid subtropical, and uses the abbreviation Cfa.

Climate data for Kenney, Texas
Month	Jan	Feb	Mar	Apr	May	Jun	Jul	Aug	Sep	Oct	Nov	Dec	Year
Mean daily maximum °C (°F)	61 (16)	65 (18)	72 (22)	79 (26)	85 (29)	92 (33)	95 (35)	96 (36)	90 (32)	82 (28)	71 (22)	63 (17)	79 (26)
Mean daily minimum °C (°F)	40 (4)	43 (6)	50 (10)	57 (14)	65 (18)	71 (22)	73 (23)	73 (23)	68 (20)	58 (14)	49 (9)	42 (6)	57 (14)
Average precipitation mm (inches)	3.1 (79)	3 (76)	3 (76)	3.6 (91)	4.5 (110)	3.8 (97)	2.6 (66)	2.7 (69)	3.8 (97)	3.9 (99)	3.9 (99)	3.6 (91)	41.5 (1,050)
Source: Weatherbase

== Education ==
A school was established at Kenney in 1885. It then had two schools in the late 1980s. Today, the community is served by the Bellville Independent School District.

== Notable people ==
- Nolan Luhn, wide receiver for the Green Bay Packers
- Red Lynn, former MLB pitcher

== Gallery ==
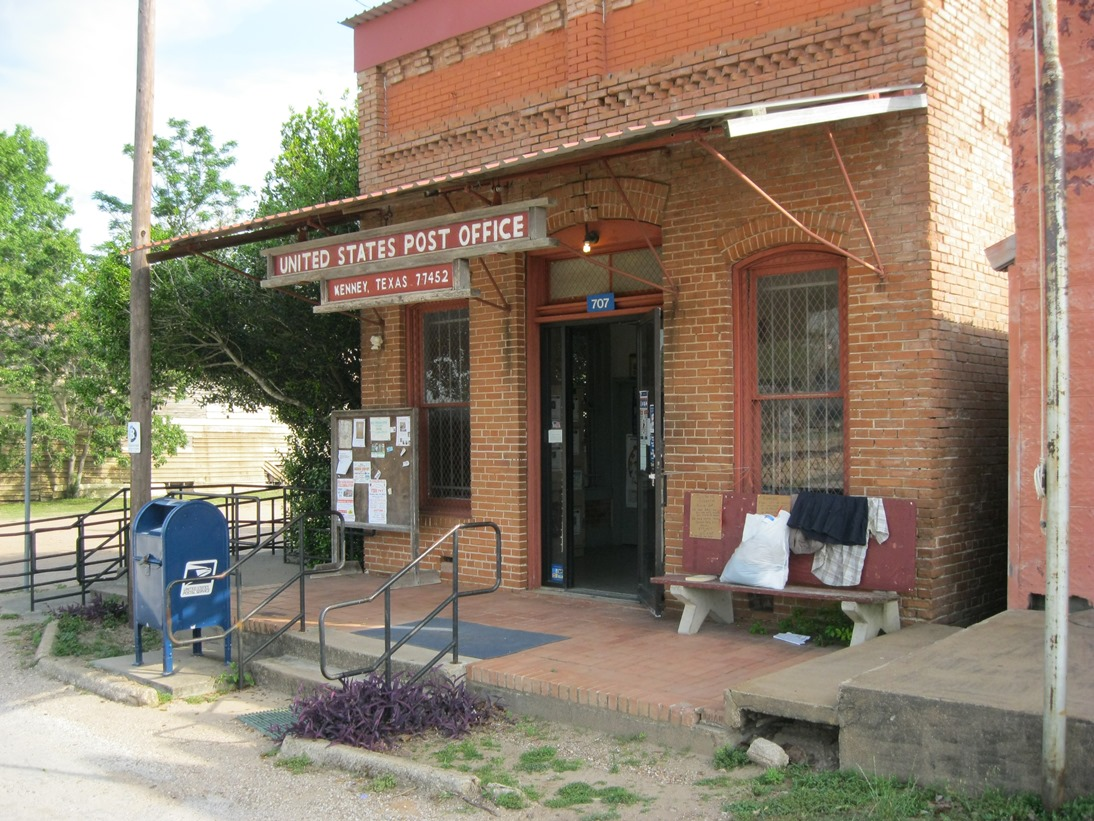
US Post Office is located on Loop 497 in Kenney.

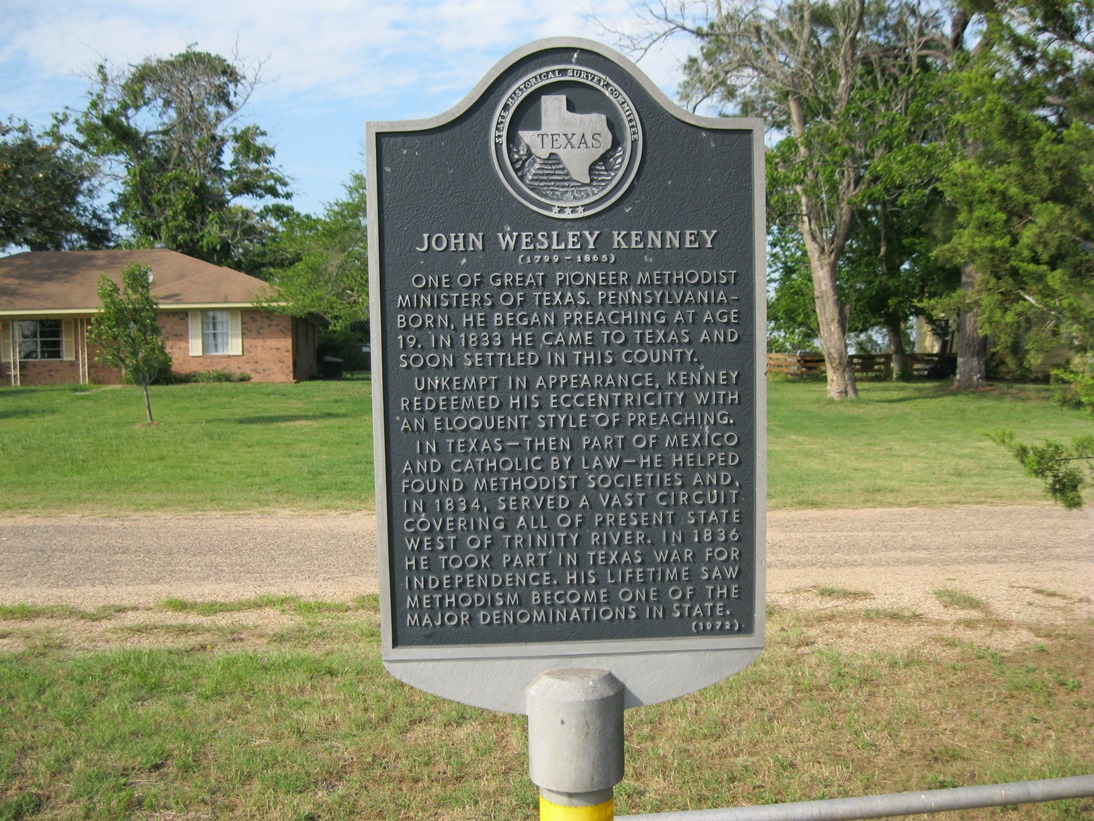
Historical marker gives a short biography of the town's namesake, Methodist preacher John Wesley Kenney.

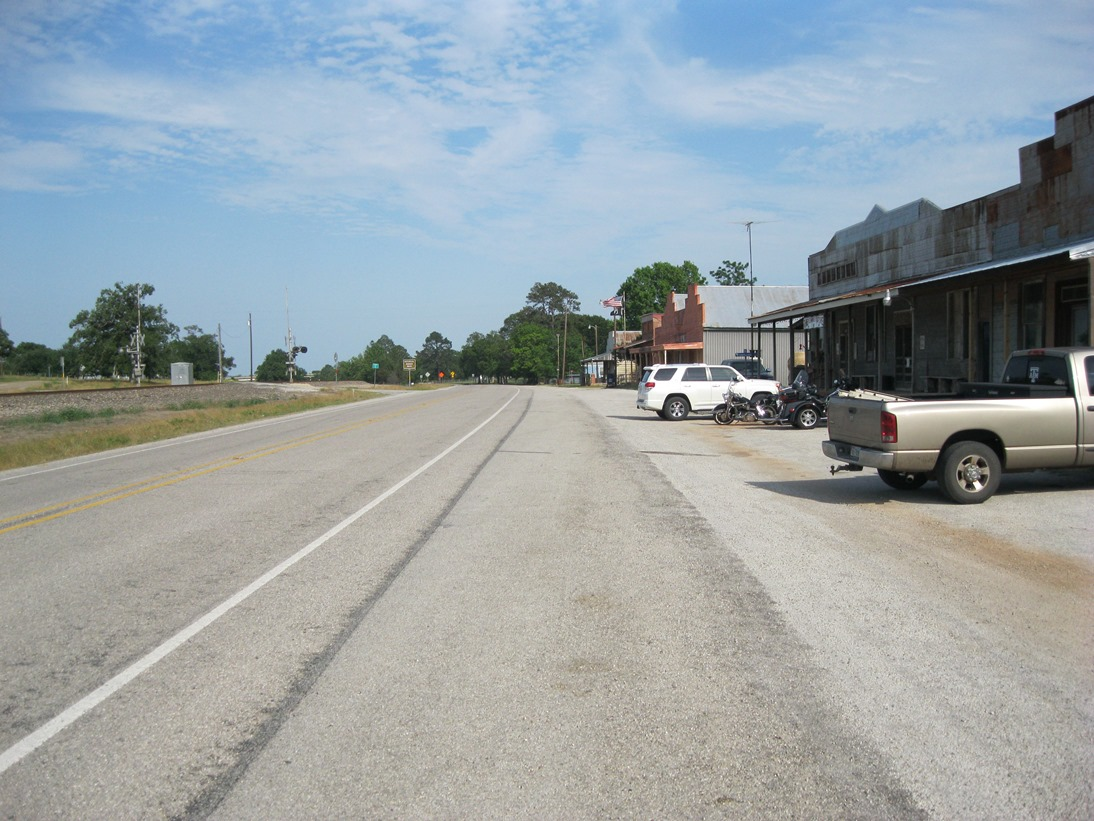
Looking southeast at some businesses on Loop 497. BNSF Railway is at left.

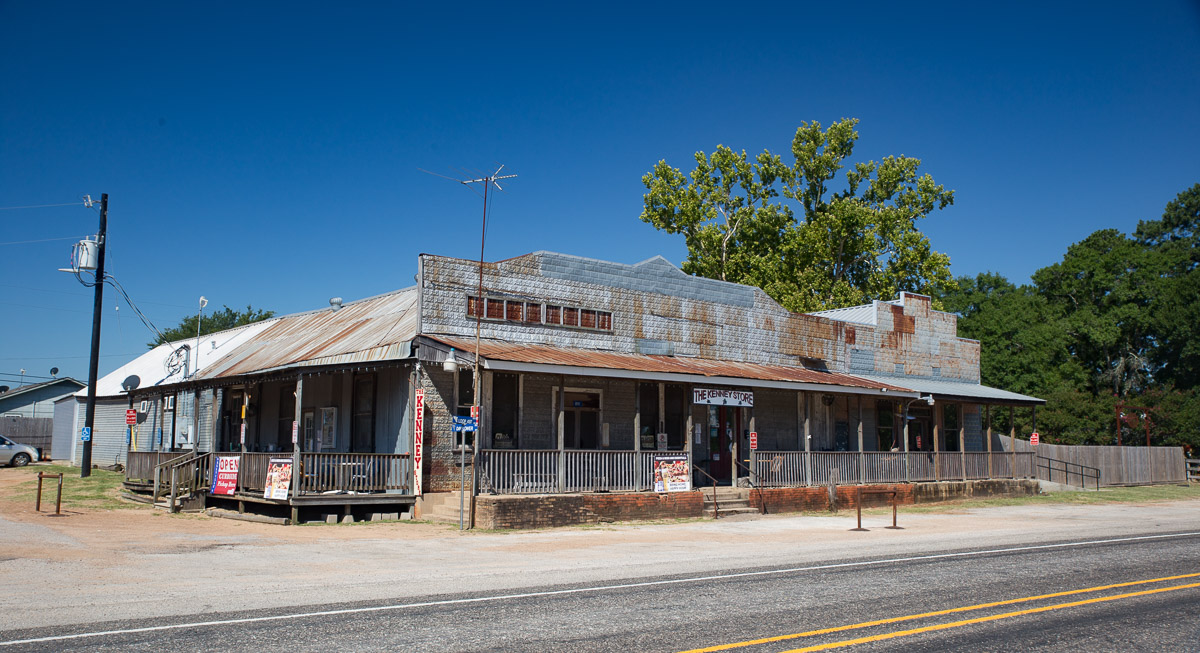
Old Kenney Store.
