= Red Lynn =

American baseball player (1913–1977)

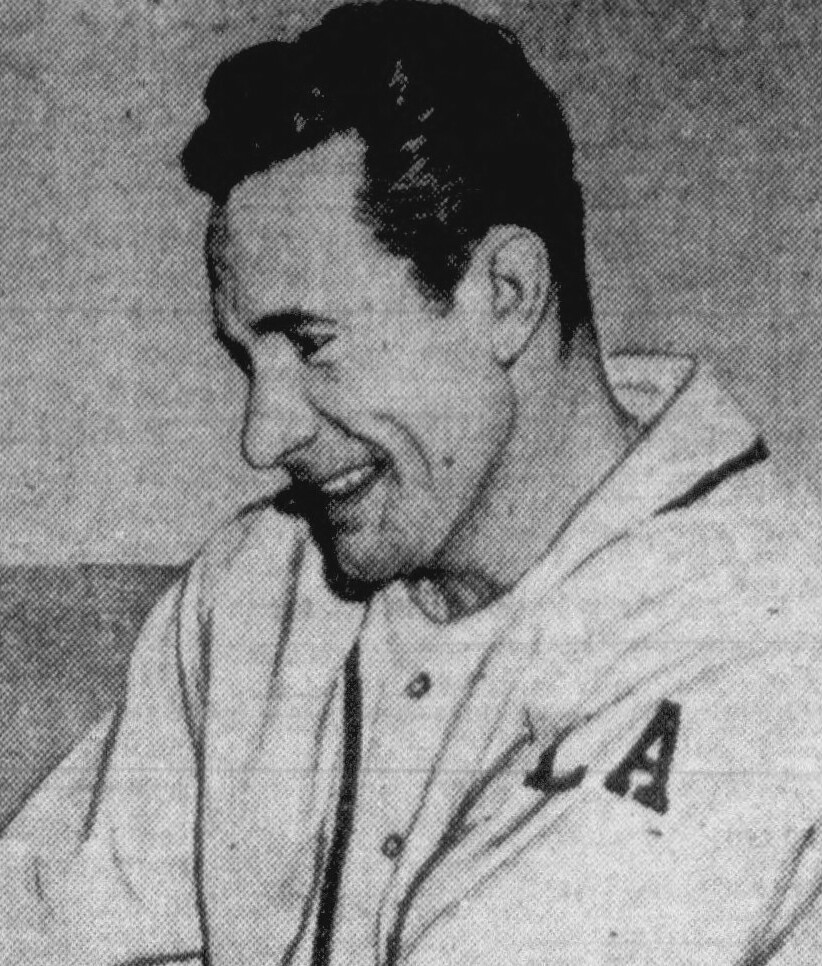
- Lynn, circa 1946
- Pitcher
- Born: December 27, 1913; Kenney, Texas, U.S.
- Died: October 27, 1977 (aged 63); Bellville, Texas, U.S.
- Batted: Right Threw: Right

MLB debut
- April 25, 1939, for the Detroit Tigers

Last MLB appearance
- October 1, 1944, for the Chicago Cubs

MLB statistics
- Win–loss record: 10–8
- Earned run average: 3.95
- Strikeouts: 85
- Stats at Baseball Reference

Teams
- Detroit Tigers (1939); New York Giants (1939–1940); Chicago Cubs (1944)

Japhet Monroe Lynn (December 27, 1913 – October 27, 1977) was an American professional baseball player who played pitcher in Major League Baseball (MLB) from 1939 to 1940 and 1944. He would play for the Chicago Cubs, Detroit Tigers, and New York Giants. Although is MLB career lasted only three seasons, his professional baseball career encompassed 23 seasons.

Listed at 6 ft 0 in (1.83 m) and weighing 162 lb (73 kg), the Kenney, Texas native was said to be ambidextrous. Although Lynn only pitched right-handed in games, he sometimes threw batting practice left-handed.

Several highlights of Lynn's minor league career came in 1937 while pitching for the Jacksonville Jax (Jacksonville, Texas in the East Texas League), when he posted a 32–13 win–loss record (leading all of professional baseball), 2.65 ERA with 233 strikeouts. He also had a breakout year in 1943 while pitching for the Los Angeles Angels in the Pacific Coast League finishing the year with a league-leading 21–8 record and 2.47 ERA.

Lynn "once told The Sporting News, 'I was a real yokel when it came to pitching. In my first game, when the catcher held down one finger, I thought he wanted me to hold the ball with one finger. I didn't know I was supposed to pitch a fast ball, which happened to be my only pitch. So I held the ball with one finger and it sailed over the catcher's head. When he held down two fingers (for a curve) I put two fingers on the ball. I was really dumb.'"

In Lynn's brief three-season MLB career, he compiled a 10–8 record, 3.95 ERA, and 85 strikeouts, while surrendering 85 walks.

Lynn work diverse jobs during the off-season including involvement in boxing and wrestling as well as a rodeo cowboy and railroad laborer.

Lynn died on October 27, 1977, in Bellville, Texas.
