= Burleigh, Texas =

- Unincorporated community
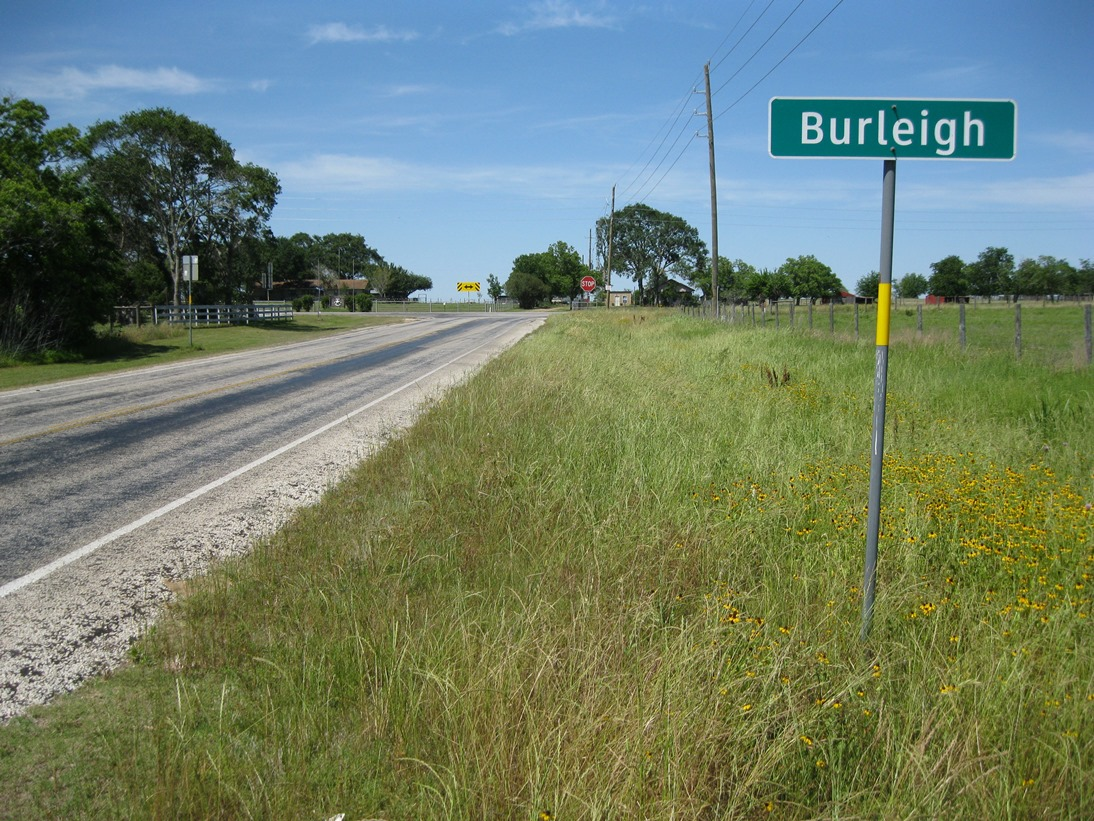
- Road sign in Burleigh

- Location within the state of Texas Burleigh, Texas (the United States)
- Coordinates: 29°55′11″N 96°9′1″W
- Country: United States
- State: Texas
- County: Austin
- Elevation: 196 ft (60 m)
- Time zone: UTC-6 (Central (CST))
  - Summer (DST): UTC-5 (CDT)
- ZIP code: 77418
- Area code: 979

Burleigh is an unincorporated community in northeastern Austin County, in the U.S. state of Texas. According to the Handbook of Texas, its population was 69 from 1972 through 2000. It is located within the Greater Houston metropolitan area.

== Geography ==
Burleigh is situated a distance of 6.7 miles (10.8 km) southeast of Bellville where eastbound FM 529 intersects with northbound FM 331. From Burleigh, FM 529 goes 33.5 miles (53.9 km) east to link with State Highway 6 in the Houston area. FM 331 connects with State Highway 36, 5.9 miles (9.5 km) to the south. For 0.4 miles (0.6 km) at Burleigh, FM 331 shares the right-of-way with FM 529, then it heads north 5.9 miles (9.5 km) before state maintenance ends at Oil Field Road. The Brazos River is 1.6 miles (2.6 km) east on FM 529, which is also called Crump Ferry Road. Burleigh is also located 26 mi (42 km) southeast of Brenham.

== History ==
The eastern part of Austin County was first settled in the 1820s, but the community itself did not appear until the late 19th century. A post office began operating out of a general store in Burleigh in 1893, but it closed in 1913. As late as 1968 the population was reckoned at about 150 souls, but in 1972 there were only 69 persons and remained at that level through 2000. There were three churches in Burleigh in the early 1980s.

Camp Gillespie, a Confederate prison, was located in Burleigh.

== Education ==
Burleigh had its own school in 1918 and had 62 students enrolled. It then had two schools in the early 1880s. Today, the community is served by the Bellville Independent School District.

== Gallery ==
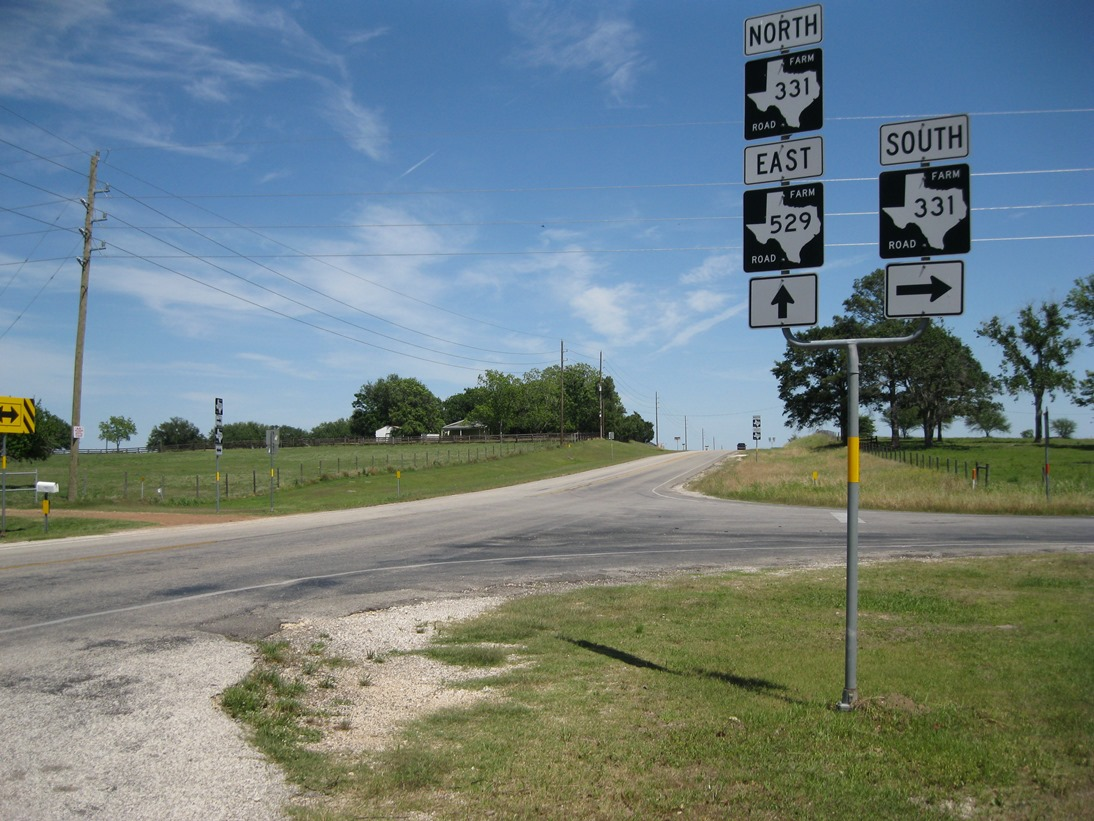
FM 529 at FM 331 looking east

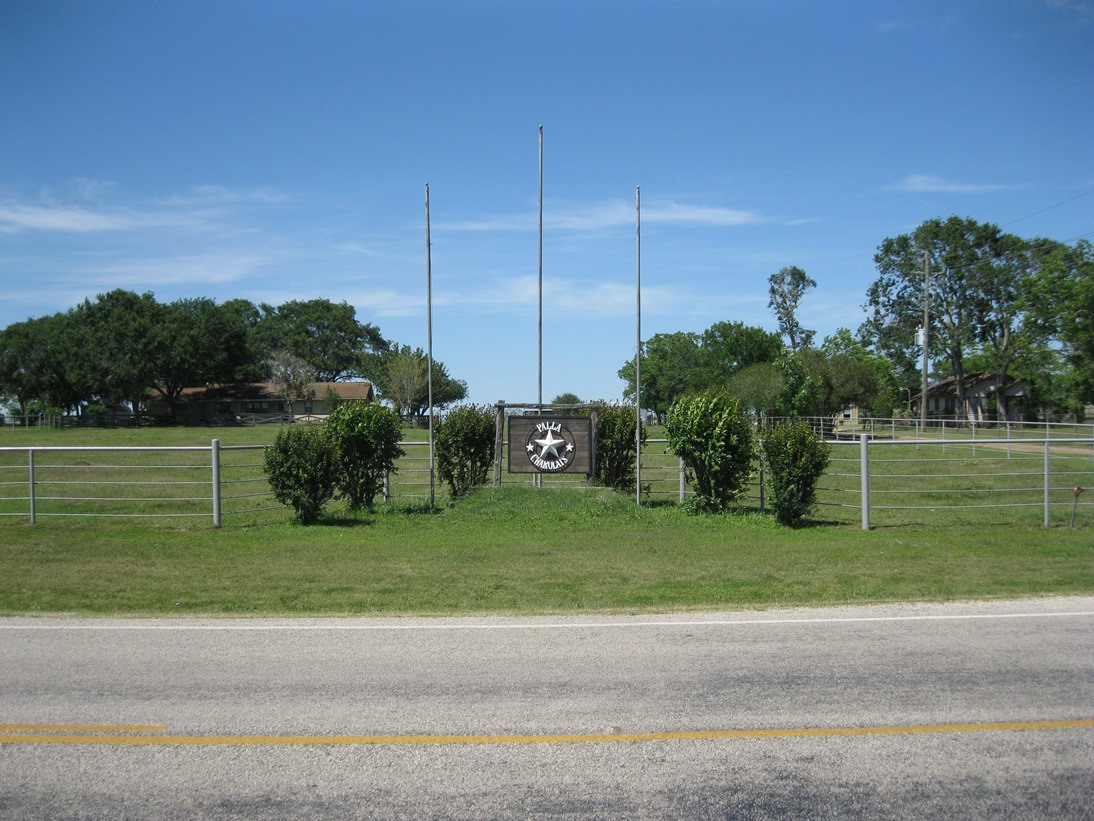
Ranch in Burleigh, Texas
