= Hunter Goodwin =

American football player (born 1972)

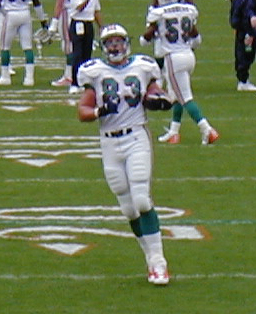
- Goodwin with the Dolphins in 2001

No. 83, 87
- Position: Tight end

Personal information
- Born: October 10, 1972 (age 54); Bellville, Texas, U.S.
- Listed height: 6 ft 5 in (1.96 m)
- Listed weight: 270 lb (122 kg)

Career information
- High school: Bellville
- College: Texas A&M
- NFL draft: 1996: 4th round, 97th overall pick

Career history
- Minnesota Vikings (1996–1998); Miami Dolphins (1999–2001); Minnesota Vikings (2002–2003); Atlanta Falcons (2004)*
- * Offseason or practice squad member only

Awards and highlights
- First-team All-SWC (1995)

Career NFL statistics
- Receptions: 37
- Receiving yards: 265
- Receiving touchdowns: 2
- Stats at Pro Football Reference

Robert Hunter Goodwin (born October 10, 1972) is an American former professional football player who was a tight end in the National Football League (NFL). He played college football for the Texas A&M Aggies.

== College career ==
Goodwin transferred from Texas A&M University–Kingsville to Texas A&M University in 1993. While in Kingsville, he was a Lone Star Conference award recipient as a tight end. He walked on to the Texas A&M football team and soon received a full scholarship. He played as an offensive tackle for the Aggies for two years where he was an All-Southwest Conference pick, second-team All-American, and GTE Scholar Athlete. Throughout his college career, he received All-Conference honors at two different schools at two different positions. Goodwin graduated from Texas A&M with a degree in agricultural economics.

== Professional career ==
Pre-draft measurables
Height	Weight	Arm length	Hand span	40-yard dash	10-yard split	20-yard split	20-yard shuttle	Vertical jump	Broad jump	Bench press
6 ft 5 1/4 in (1.96 m)	279 lb (127 kg)	33 1/8 in (0.84 m)	9 3/4 in (0.25 m)	4.97 s	1.76 s	2.88 s	4.44 s	31.0 in (0.79 m)	9 ft 7 in (2.92 m)	22 reps

Goodwin was the 97th pick of the 1996 NFL Draft to the Minnesota Vikings as a tight end. He played as a tight end in the NFL for nine years: five with Minnesota, and three with the Miami Dolphins. Although he signed with Atlanta in March 2004, he was forced to retire four months later due to a hip injury. While in the NFL, he served as Team Captain in the 1999 and 2000 seasons. He was also an NFL Players Representative for three years, a 2002 USA Today All-Joe pick, and a spokesman for several commercials, including a nationally televised Snickers commercial. Goodwin was also a draft day commentator for various Austin, Texas media outlets.

While Goodwin logged only 37 catches and two touchdowns throughout his pro career, he was known more for his blocking abilities. Goodwin was picked up by the Miami Dolphins in 1999 while he was a restricted free agent by then head coach, Jimmy Johnson. Johnson paid for him to come in and improve their running game, and Goodwin did. A high point in his career came in 2000 when Merril Hoge dubbed Goodwin as "the best blocking tight end in the league" in one of his ESPN commentaries. Many believe that 2000 was Goodwin's best year. Hoge went on to say that Goodwin can easily handle any defensive end with no help drastically improving the offensive line. When Goodwin was awarded the "All Joe" pick, his teammates were quoted as saying that he is the sixth offensive lineman.

== Personal life ==
Goodwin's charity and volunteer work have included Habitat For Humanity, numerous visits to the children's hospitals in the Metropolitan area, the Cystic Fibrosis foundation in Miami, and Special Olympics. He has a first cousin who was diagnosed with cerebral palsy, and Goodwin has been quoted as saying, ("if only all kids could be as smart and well adjusted as he is"). Goodwin participated each year in the Miami Dolphins Fishing Tournament in which the proceeds are used to help the Cystic Fibrosis Foundation. Goodwin, an avid outdoorsman, caught the largest tuna in the 1999 tournament.

Goodwin currently works as a real estate developer and president of Oldham Goodwin Group, LLC. He resides in College Station, Texas with his wife, Amber (also Texas A&M University Class of 1997), daughter Ella Grace, and son Rockne "Holt" Goodwin. He appeared in Fox Sports Southwest as a commentator during the 2005 Texas A&M Football season. Locals may hear his voice before Texas A&M Football games on fan website TexAgs' radio show on Thursdays at 9:00 AM for "The Hunter Goodwin Hour." Goodwin is active with the City of College Station Design Review Board, Scotty's House, and other boards and charities around the Brazos Valley.
