= Farm to Market Road 109 =

Road in Texas, United States

Farm to Market Road 109

Route information
- Maintained by TxDOT
- Length: 34.245 mi (55.112 km)
- Existed: August 1, 1944–present

Major junctions
- South end: Bus. SH 71 in Columbus
- FM 1291 in Frelsburg; FM 1094 in New Ulm; SH 159 in Industry; FM 2502 in Welcome
- North end: SH 36 in Brenham

Location
- Country: United States
- State: Texas
- Counties: Austin, Colorado, Washington

Highway system
- Highways in Texas; Interstate; US; State; Former; Toll; Loops; Spurs; FM/RM; Park; Rec
| ← FM 108 | → FM 110 |

Farm to Market Road 109 (FM 109) is a farm to market road in the U.S. state of Texas. The highway begins at Business State Highway 71 (SH 71) just north of Columbus in Colorado County. It winds its way to the northeast across Austin County, passing through the communities of New Ulm and Industry before ending at State Highway 36 (SH 36) in Brenham in Washington County.

== Route description ==
FM 109 begins at an intersection with Business SH 71 about 0.5 miles (0.8 km) northwest of the bridge over the Colorado River. This location is just north of Columbus in Colorado County. After going north for 1.8 miles (2.9 km), the highway crosses Cummins Creek and heads northeast for a short distance before turning back to the north again. From its start to Frelsburg is 11.2 miles (18.0 km). At Frelsburg, FM 109 comes to a crossroads at Heinsohn's Country Store, with FM 1291 coming from the west and McElroy Lane coming from the north. At the intersection, FM 109 turns sharply to the east. The highway gradually swings to the east-northeast for 3.8 miles (6.1 km) before entering New Ulm in Austin County. FM 109 is also called Ernst Parkway in this area. At New Ulm, the highway crosses the BNSF Railway tracks and intersects with FM 1094 from the east. FM 109 leaves New Ulm heading north and continues for 5.8 miles (9.3 km) to Industry. At this place, the highway intersects with SH 159, which goes east and west. From Industry, FM 109 heads north-northeast for 4.9 miles (7.9 km) until crossing FM 2502 near the community of Welcome. From this point, the highway heads to the northeast 8.3 miles (13.4 km) until its end. Just inside the southern city limits of Brenham, FM 109 crosses the BNSF Railway tracks and ends at a traffic signal on SH 36.

== History ==
FM 109 was originally designated on August 1, 1944, to go from Industry to New Ulm and from Frelsburg to SH 71 near Columbus. On June 13 and 16, 1945, the two separate sections were linked when a new section between New Ulm and Frelsburg was added. On December 16, 1948, FM 109 was extended from Industry to SH 36 south of Brenham, replacing FM 388, which went from the Colorado County line to SH 36. The new segment went through the communities of Welcome and Muellersville.

== Major intersections ==
| County | Location | mi | km | Destinations | Notes |
|---|---|---|---|---|---|
| Colorado | Columbus | 0.0 | 0.0 | Bus. SH 71 | Southern terminus of FM 109 |
| Colorado | Frelsburg | 11.2 | 18.0 | FM 1291 | |
| Austin | New Ulm | 15.0 | 24.1 | FM 1094 | |
| Austin | Industry | 20.8 | 33.5 | SH 159 | |
| Austin | Welcome | 25.7 | 41.4 | FM 2502 | |
| Washington | Brenham | 34.2 | 55.0 | SH 36 | Northern terminus of FM 109 |
1.000 mi = 1.609 km; 1.000 km = 0.621 mi
