= Texas State Highway 36 =

State highway in Texas

State Highway 36

Route information
- Maintained by TxDOT
- Length: 343.1 mi (552.2 km)
- Existed: 1919–present

Major junctions
- South end: SH 288 / FM 1495 in Freeport
- I-69 / US 59 in Rosenberg; I-10 near Sealy; US 77 / US 190 Milano; US 79 in Cameron; I-35 / US 190 in Temple; US 84 in Gatesville; US 67 / US 377 in Comanche
- North end: Bus. US 83 in Abilene

Location
- Country: United States
- State: Texas
- Counties: Brazoria, Fort Bend, Austin, Washington, Burleson, Milam, Bell, Coryell, Hamilton, Comanche, Eastland, Callahan, Taylor

Highway system
- Highways in Texas; Interstate; US; State; Former; Toll; Loops; Spurs; FM/RM; Park; Rec
← SH 35	→ I-37

State Highway 36 (SH 36) runs from Freeport to Abilene. It was designated as the 36th Division Memorial Highway between Cameron and Sealy by the Texas Legislature in 1985.

== History ==
SH 36 was originally proposed on November 21, 1917, as a route from Cisco to Waco. On December 20, 1917, this became part of SH 18.

On November 20, 1917, an intercounty highway was designated from Goldthwaite to Temple. On January 24, 1918, the intercounty highway was extended to Cameron. On March 18, 1918, the intercounty highway was extended to Brenham. On March 20, 1918, SH 36 was designated as a route from Goldthwaite to Hearne. On January 23, 1919, SH 36 was extended to Richmond, and the old route had been changed to SH 36A. On March 19, 1919, SH 36 was extended to Freeport. On August 21, 1923, the sections from Temple to Goldthwaite and Richmond to Freeport were cancelled. On January 16, 1928, SH 36 was extended back to Freeport. On September 19, 1929, SH 36 was extended northwest to Hamilton. On December 18, 1932, the route was extended to Rising Star, with the section from Hamilton to Comanche replacing part of SH 22. On February 10, 1933, the section from Rising Star to Comanche was cancelled. On July 10, 1933, the route was extended to its current terminus in Abilene. On October 4, 1935, the section from Cross Plains to Comanche was cancelled. On January 21, 1936, the section from Abilene to Cross Plains was cancelled. Later that year, the section from Temple to Gatesville was cancelled. On September 22, 1936, the section from Abilene to SH 191 was restored. On February 11, 1937, the sections from Temple to a lateral road (now SH 317) and from Rising Star to Comanche were restored. On April 28, 1937, the section from Rising Star to Comanche was cancelled again, but the section from the lateral road to Gatesville was restored. On May 18, 1937, the section from the lateral road to Gatesville was cancelled again, but the section from Rising Star to Comanche was restored. On November 5, 1937, the section from the lateral road to Gatesville was restored again. On January 6, 1939, SH 36 had been rerouted on its current route south of Temple. On August 31, 1939, the section from SH 191 to Rising Star was restored, but the section from Rising Star to northwest of Comanche was cancelled. On December 10, 1946, the section from Rising Star to northwest of Comanche was restored. Only minor route changes to bypass Brenham on June 4, 1964, Temple on January 24, 1978, and Freeport on January 28, 1985 were made.

Historic SH 36A

SH 36A was a spur route of SH 36 designated on January 23, 1919, splitting off at Cameron and traveling east to Hearne as a replacement for part of SH 36, which was rerouted. On August 21, 1923, the route had been renumbered as SH 69. An alternate routing just south of Temple, serving the town of Heidenheimer, was designated on May 25, 1925. A new SH 36A was designated on September 18, 1929, from Temple to Valley Mills. On March 19, 1930, it was renumbered as SH 153 (now SH 317). The alternate route of SH 36 through Heidenheimer was changed to SH 36A that day. On August 27, 1935, the route had been renumbered SH 221.

SH 36B was a spur route of the original routing of SH 36 designated on July 20, 1920, splitting off at Lampasas and travelling southeast to Georgetown. On January 15, 1923, it was extended to Brady. On August 21, 1923, it had been renumbered as SH 74 (now US 190 and US 183).

== Business routes ==
SH 36 has two business routes.

=== Gatesville business loop ===
Business State Highway 36-E
- Location: Gatesville
- Length: 4.696 mi (7.557 km)
- Existed: 1990–present

Business State Highway 36-E (Bus. SH 36-E), formerly Loop 452, is a 4.696-mile (7.557 km) long business loop that runs on the former routing of SH 36 through Gatesville. The road was bypassed on April 18, 1986, by SH 36 and designated Loop 452. The road was redesignated as Business SH 36-E on June 21, 1990.

=== Brenham business loop ===
Business State Highway 36-J
- Location: Brenham
- Length: 3.832 mi (6.167 km)
- Existed: 1990–present

Business State Highway 36-J (Bus. SH 36-J), formerly Loop 283, is a 3.832-mile (6.167 km) long business loop that runs on the former routing of SH 36 through Brenham. The road was bypassed on June 4, 1964, and designated Loop 283. The road was designated as Business SH 36-J on June 21, 1990.

== Proposed future Alternate 36 ==
Alternate State Highway 36
- Location: Pleak - north of Hempstead
- Length: 75 mi (121 km)
- Existed: 2017–present

A group calling itself the Highway 36A Coalition has proposed a new highway (tentatively titled Highway 36A) which would run between SH 36 at Pleak and another planned route in Waller County (the proposed Prairie Parkway), ultimately connecting to SH 6 north of Hempstead. According to the Coalition, the new highway would be limited access (along with improvements to the existing Highway 36 between Freeport and Pleak) and provide a western bypass of the Greater Houston area (as well as a new hurricane evacuation corridor).

== Major intersections ==
County	Location	mi	km	Destinations	Notes
Brazoria	Freeport			FM 1495 – Surfside Beach, Quintana County Park, Quintana Beach, Bryan Beach, Port Freeport, Brazos Harbor	South end of SH 288 overlap
Brazoria	Freeport			SH 288 north – Freeport, Angleton, Houston	Interchange; north end of SH 288 overlap
Brazoria				Bridge over Brazos River	
Brazoria				FM 2004 north / FM 2611 south – Lake Jackson, Angleton, Houston	
Brazoria	Brazoria			FM 521 west – Wadsworth	South end of FM 521 overlap
Brazoria	Brazoria			SH 332 east / FM 521 east – Clute, Lake Jackson	North end of FM 521 overlap
Brazoria				FM 522 south	
Brazoria	West Columbia			Bus. SH 35 (17th Street) – Sweeny, Bay City, Angleton, Business District	
Brazoria	West Columbia			SH 35 – Pledger, Angleton, Business District, Varner-Hogg State Historic Site	
Brazoria	Damon			FM 1462 east – Rosharon, Brazos Bend State Park	
Fort Bend	Guy			FM 1994 north	
Fort Bend				FM 442 west – Boling	
Fort Bend	Needville			FM 360 north – Needville	
Fort Bend	Needville			FM 1236 south – Business District, Historic Downtown	
Fort Bend				FM 361 south – Fairchild	
Fort Bend	Pleak			FM 2218 north – Richmond	
Fort Bend	Rosenberg			I-69 / US 59 – Victoria, Houston	I-69/US 59 exit 97
Fort Bend	Rosenberg			FM 1640 (Avenue I)	
Fort Bend	Rosenberg			US 90 Alt. east (Avenue H) / FM 723 north – Fulshear, Richmond, Historic Downtown District	South end of US 90 Alt. overlap
Fort Bend	Rosenberg			Spur 529 south – Wharton	
Fort Bend	Rosenberg			US 90 Alt. west – Eagle Lake	North end of US 90 Alt. overlap
Fort Bend	Rosenberg			Spur 10 south	
Fort Bend				FM 1489 – Simonton	
Austin	Wallis			FM 1952 south – Tavener	
Austin	Wallis			FM 1093 east – Fulshear	South end of FM 1093 overlap
Austin	Wallis			SH 60 south – Wharton	
Austin				FM 1093 west – Eagle Lake	North end of FM 1093 overlap
Austin	Sealy			FM 3013 west – Eagle Lake	
Austin	Sealy			I-10 – Columbus, San Antonio, Houston	I-10 exit 720
Austin	Sealy			Loop 350 north (South Circle) to US 90	
Austin	Sealy			Loop 350 south (North Circle) to US 90	
Austin	Sealy			FM 1094 west – New Ulm	
Austin	Sealy			FM 2187 west	
Austin				FM 331 north – Burleigh	
Austin				FM 949 west – Cat Spring	
Austin	Bellville			FM 2429 south – Cat Spring	
Austin	Bellville			SH 159 east – Hempstead	South end of SH 159 overlap
Austin	Bellville			FM 1456 east (North Bell Street) – Buckhorn	traffic circle around Austin County Courthouse
Austin	Bellville			SH 159 west – La Grange	North end of SH 159 overlap
Austin				Loop 497 – Kenney	Interchange
Austin				Hall Road	interchange
Austin				Loop 497 – Kenney	
Washington	Brenham			FM 109 south – Industry	
Washington	Brenham			US 290 east / Bus. SH 36 north – Downtown Brenham, Houston	interchange; south end of US 290 overlap; south end of freeway
Washington	Brenham			Lubbock Street / Industrial Boulevard	Northbound exit and southbound entrance
Washington	Brenham			FM 389 – Blinn College, Industrial Park	
Washington	Brenham			Old Mill Creek Road	
Washington	Brenham			US 290 west / Bus. US 290 east – Austin, Brenham	interchange; north end of US 290 overlap; north end of freeway
Washington	Brenham			FM 577 south	
Washington	Brenham			Bus. SH 36 south – Brenham	Interchange; no southbound entrance
Washington				FM 390 – Gay Hill, Burton, Independence	
Washington	Quarry			FM 1948 south – Somerville Dam and Reservoir	
Burleson	Somerville			FM 1361 east	
Burleson	Lyons			FM 60 east – Snook, College Station	South end of FM 60 overlap
Burleson	Lyons			FM 60 west – Lake Somerville Birch Creek Unit	North end of FM 60 overlap
Burleson				FM 976 west – Deanville, Lake Somerville State Park Birch Creek Unit	
Burleson	Caldwell			FM 166 east – Tunis	
Burleson	Caldwell			Loop 83 (Buck Street) – Business District	
Burleson	Caldwell			SH 21 – Bastrop, Bryan	
Burleson				FM 1363 west – Chriesman	
Milam	Milano			US 79 north / US 190 east – Hearne	South end of US 79 / US 190 overlap, future I-14
Milam	Milano			FM 3242 north	
Milam	Milano			US 79 south – Rockdale	North end of US 79 overlap
Milam				US 77 south – Rockdale	South end of US 77 overlap
Milam				FM 2095 east – Gause, Hearne	
Milam	Cameron			US 77 north (North Travis Avenue) – Rosebud	North end of US 77 overlap
Milam	Cameron			FM 1600 south (North Crockett Avenue)	
Milam	Cameron			FM 2269 north	
Milam				FM 845 east	
Milam	Pettibone			FM 486 south – Thorndale	
Milam	Buckholts			FM 1915 south	South end of FM 1915 overlap
Milam	Buckholts			FM 1915 north	North end of FM 1915 overlap
Bell	Rogers			FM 2184 north – New Colony	south end of FM 2184 overlap
Bell	Rogers			FM 437 – Davilla, Holland, Zabcikville	
Bell	Rogers			FM 2184 south – Joe Lee	north end of FM 2184 overlap
Bell				Bus. US 190 west	
Bell				FM 436 – Little River-Academy	Interchange; no direct southbound exit (signed at FM 93)
Bell				FM 93 – Belton	Interchange
Bell				Bus. US 190 east	
Bell				FM 3117 east – Oscar	
Bell	Temple			SH 95 south / Loop 363 north to I-35 north – Waco, Taylor	Interchange; south end of Loop 363 overlap
Bell	Temple			Spur 290 north – Temple	interchange; south end of freeway
Bell	Temple			To 5th Street (1st Street) / Spur 290	
Bell	Temple			FM 1741 (31st Street)	Access to Scott & White Memorial Hospital
Bell	Temple			57th Street / Thornton Lane	
Bell	Temple			I-35 (US 190 west) – Waco, Austin	North end of US 190 overlap, future I-14; I-35 exit 299
Bell	Temple			Wildflower Lane	Southbound exit only
Bell	Temple			FM 2305 – Lake Belton	interchange; north end of freeway
Bell	Temple			SH 53 east / Loop 363 north to I-35 – Temple	North end of Loop 363 overlap
Bell	Temple			SH 317 – Belton, Moody	Interchange
Bell				FM 2409 north – White Hall	
Coryell				SH 236 north / FM 1114 south – The Grove, McGregor, Mother Neff State Park	
Coryell				FM 184 south	
Coryell	Flat			FM 931 – Leon Junction	
Coryell				FM 1829 north – Mound	
Coryell	Gatesville			FM 107 east – Moody	
Coryell	Gatesville			Bus. SH 36 west – Gatesville	
Coryell	Gatesville			US 84 – Evant, Waco	Interchange
Coryell				FM 929 – Coryell City, Woodman State Jail, Texas Department of Criminal Justice Hughes Unit	
Coryell				Bus. SH 36 east (State School Road) / FM 215	Interchange
Coryell				FM 182 north – Turnersville	
Coryell				FM 2955 north – Pancake	
Coryell	Jonesboro			FM 217 east – Mosheim	
Hamilton	Jonesboro			FM 1602 north – Fairy	
Hamilton	Hamilton			SH 22 east – Meridian	east end of SH 22 overlap
Hamilton	Hamilton			US 281 (Rice Street) – Lampasas, Evant, Stephenville, Hico	west end of SH 22 overlap
Hamilton	Hamilton			FM 218 west – Pottsville, Goldthwaite	
Comanche	Siloam			FM 1702 – Energy, Dublin	
Comanche	Gustine			Loop 130 west (Speed Street North)	
Comanche	Gustine			Loop 130 east (Main Street East)	
Comanche				FM 1476 – Pettit, Newburg, Proctor	
Comanche				US 67 north / US 377 north – Stephenville	east end of US 67/US 377 overlap
Comanche	Comanche			SH 16 – Goldthwaite	
Comanche	Comanche			US 67 south / US 377 south – Brownwood	west end of US 67/ US 377 overlap
Comanche	Comanche			FM 1689 west – Sidney, May	
Comanche	Comanche			FM Spur 2247 east (West Wrights Avenue)	
Comanche				FM 589 west – Sidney	
Comanche				FM 588 north – Beattie	
Comanche	Stag Creek			FM 1477 south	east end of FM 1477 overlap
Comanche				FM 1477 north – Sipe Springs	west end of FM 1477 overlap
Eastland	Chuckville			FM 587 east – De Leon, Carbon	
Eastland	Rising Star			US 183	
Eastland				FM 583 south	
Eastland				FM 569 north	
Eastland				FM 374 east	east end of FM 374 overlap
Eastland				FM 374 west	west end of FM 374 overlap
Callahan	Cross Plains			SH 206 to SH 279 – Brownwood, Coleman, Cisco	
Callahan				FM 2707 south	
Callahan	Rowden			FM 2287 east	
Callahan				US 283 – Coleman, Baird	
Callahan	Denton			FM 604 – Oplin, Clyde	
Callahan				FM 603 north – Eula	
Callahan				FM 1178 south – Dudley	
Callahan				FM 1750 north – Potosi	
Taylor	Abilene			FM 18 east – Clyde	
Taylor	Abilene			Loop 322 to I-20 / US 83 / US 84	interchange
Taylor	Abilene			FM 1750 south (Oldham Lane) – Potosi	
Taylor	Abilene			Bus. US 83 (Treadaway Boulevard) – Winters, Coleman, Anson	
1.000 mi = 1.609 km; 1.000 km = 0.621 mi: Concurrency terminus; Incomplete access
