= Caroline Ernst =

American settler (1819–1902)

Caroline Ernst (February 13, 1819 – May 12, 1902) was an American settler. She was born on February 13, 1819, in Germany. Her parents, Louise Ernst and Johann Friedrich Ernst or Diercks moved to Texas, then a part of Mexico, in 1831. The family settled in Austin County, Texas and established the first permanent German colony in Texas. Ernst published her account Life of German Pioneers in Early Texas in 1899. She married Louis von Roeder, and the couple had three children before Louis died in the Texas Cart War. Ernst died in 1902.
