= Ernie Koy Jr. =

American football player (born 1942)

No. 23
- Positions: Running back, Wide receiver, Punter

Personal information
- Born: October 22, 1942 (age 84); Bellville, Texas, U.S.
- Listed height: 6 ft 3 in (1.91 m)
- Listed weight: 230 lb (104 kg)

Career information
- High school: Bellville
- College: Texas (1961–1964)
- NFL draft: 1965: 11th round, 141st overall pick
- AFL draft: 1965: 3rd round, 18th overall pick

Career history
- New York Giants (1965–1970)

Awards and highlights
- Pro Bowl (1967); National champion (1963); Second-team All-SWC (1964)

Career NFL statistics
- Rushing yards: 1,723
- Rushing average: 4.2
- Receptions: 76
- Receiving yards: 498
- Total touchdowns: 15
- Punts: 223
- Punting yards: 8,583
- Longest punt: 67
- Stats at Pro Football Reference

Ernest Melvin Koy Jr. (born October 22, 1942) is an American former professional football player who was a running back for the New York Giants of the National Football League (NFL). He played college football for the Texas Longhorns from 1962 to 1964 and was selected by the Giants in the 11th round of the 1965 NFL draft. He scored two touchdowns in Texas upset victory over number 1 ranked Alabama in the 1965 Orange Bowl.

== Early life ==
Koy was born on October 22, 1942, in Bellville, Texas. His father, Ernie Koy Sr., was a Major League Baseball player, All-Southwest Conference (SWC) football and baseball player at the University of Texas, teammate of Babe Ruth, and had once defeated Jesse Owens in the 100-yard dash. His five-year younger brother Ted Koy would also star in football at Texas and go on to a career in the NFL.

Koy attended Bellville High School, and was a high school All-American and all-Southern halfback, punter and linebacker. In 1960, he was selected team captain and “Most Valuable Texas High School Player”. He played in the Texas High School All-Star Game in 1961. He was inducted into the Texas High School Football Hall of Fame in 1989. He led the team to the 1960 Class 2A state title game.

== College football ==
Koy attended the University of Texas, where he played running back and punter on the Longhorns varsity football team, 1962–65. He played under future College Football Hall of Fame head coach Darrell Royal. He was a wingback on the 1962 Longhorn team, rushing for 185 yards and a 5.8 yards per carry average. The team won the SWC title, and had a 9–0–1 record before losing the 1963 Cotton Bowl to Louisiana State University. His punting in the October 13, 1962 game against the University of Oklahoma had been pivotal in the Texas victory.

He was a member of the undefeated 1963 Texas Longhorns football team, which won a national championship, although he missed most of the season to injury and illness; playing in only three games.

In 1964, he led the team in rushing, with 574 yards. He also led the SWC in touchdowns (8). Texas played number one ranked Alabama in the 1965 Orange Bowl. The Crimson Tide was led by coaching great Bear Bryant and future Pro Football Hall of Fame quarterback Joe Namath. Koy had a 79-yard touchdown run in Texas' 21–17 upset victory over Alabama. He also scored a second touchdown which provided the margin of victory in the game. A photo of Koy from the Orange Bowl was on the January 11, 1965 cover of Sports Illustrated.

Koy was named an All-SWC Freshman Back, SWC Outstanding Back, All-SWC second-team, and received an All-American honorable mention. He was recognized with the Longhorn Sportsmanship Award in 1964. Koy also was selected to play in the Hula Bowl.

Koy (1998), his father (1960) and his brother Ted (1995) have all been inducted into the University of Texas Athletics Hall of Honor.

== Professional football ==
The New York Giants selected Koy with the first pick in the 11th round of the 1965 NFL draft. He was taken in the 3rd round of the 1965 American Football League (AFL) draft by the Houston Oilers, but chose to play in New York. Koy believed the NFL to be the more stable league, and said that he had always wanted to come and play in New York, like his father did for the Brooklyn Dodgers.

It was reported in early September 1966 that Koy was drafted into the military, but the Giants denied that not long after it was reported. He received a temporary draft deferment after suffering a perforated eardrum and viral infection in Giants' training camp the following month.

During his six years in the NFL, Koy played in 79 games, carried 414 times and gained 1,723 yards. He also has 498 receiving yards with 76 receptions, many from future Hall of fame Giants quarterback Fran Tarkenton (1967–1971). In addition, he completed six passes in 12 attempts, with one touchdown and one interception. Koy was also the Giants' punter with a 38.5 yard average on 223 punts over six years. He also returned 30 kicks during his career.

Koy's best year came in 1967. He rushed for 704 yards, with a 4.8 yards per carry average and four touchdowns. He also caught 32 passes for 212 yards and another touchdown. He was selected to the Pro Bowl for the only time in his career. He also punted 40 times for 1,509 yards that year.

Koy was part of the "baby bulls" backfield with Tucker Frederickson and Steve Thurlow. He was waived by the Giants before the start of the 1971 season.

== Personal ==
After he retired from the NFL, Koy began a career in banking. He returned to his hometown of Bellville, Texas to work at a savings and loan there. He later worked for Austin County State Bank, which was eventually sold to Wells Fargo.

Koy returned to Bellville after retiring and after two years earned a master's degree in education in 1973. He also worked as an assistant coach at Sam Houston State University in Huntsville, Texas. In Bellville, Koy had a 25-year association with the booster club of Bellville High. In 1979, he helped create a nonprofit organization that teaches life skills to the mentally challenged. He served a seven-year term on the Brazos River Authority, until 2004.
