= Friedrich Diercks =

First German emigrant in Texas

Friedrich Diercks or Friedrich Ernst (June 18, 1796 – 1848) was born at Burg (castle) Gödens near the village of Neustadtgödens. In February 1814 he joined the Oldenburg Regiment of the Duke of Oldenburg, and he remained a soldier until June 1819. In 1831, Friedrich Diercks received land at Mill Creek in Austin County and began writing letters to friends in Oldenburg and Westphalia. Upon reading about the favorable conditions in Austin's colony, he and his family set out for Texas.

On April 16 Ernst obtained a league of land on the west bank of the west fork of Mill Creek in Austin's colony. Ernst became well known as a benefactor to new German immigrants and acquired the nickname "father of the immigrants". Later, he became a justice of the peace in Austin County and sold lots from his league to new immigrants. The resulting settlement, Industry, was the first German town in Texas. Diercks died in 1848.

== See also ==
- Caroline Ernst Diercks' daughter
