= Rockhouse, Texas =

- Unincorporated community
- Location within Texas Location within the United States
- Coordinates: 29.9571686°N 96.5560830°W
- Country: United States
- State: Texas
- County: Austin
- Elevation: 381 ft (116 m)
- Time zone: UTC-6 (Central (CST))
  - Summer (DST): UTC-5 (CDT)
- Area code: 979
- GNIS feature ID: 2034855

Rockhouse, also Rock House, is an unincorporated community in Austin County, in the U.S. state of Texas. According to the Handbook of Texas, the community had a population of 30 in 2000. It is located within the Greater Houston metropolitan area.

== Education ==
Rockhouse had its own school in 1918, with 12 students enrolled. Today, the community is served by the Bellville Independent School District.
