= San Bernard River =

River in Texas

Coordinates: 28.85224°N 95.44084°W

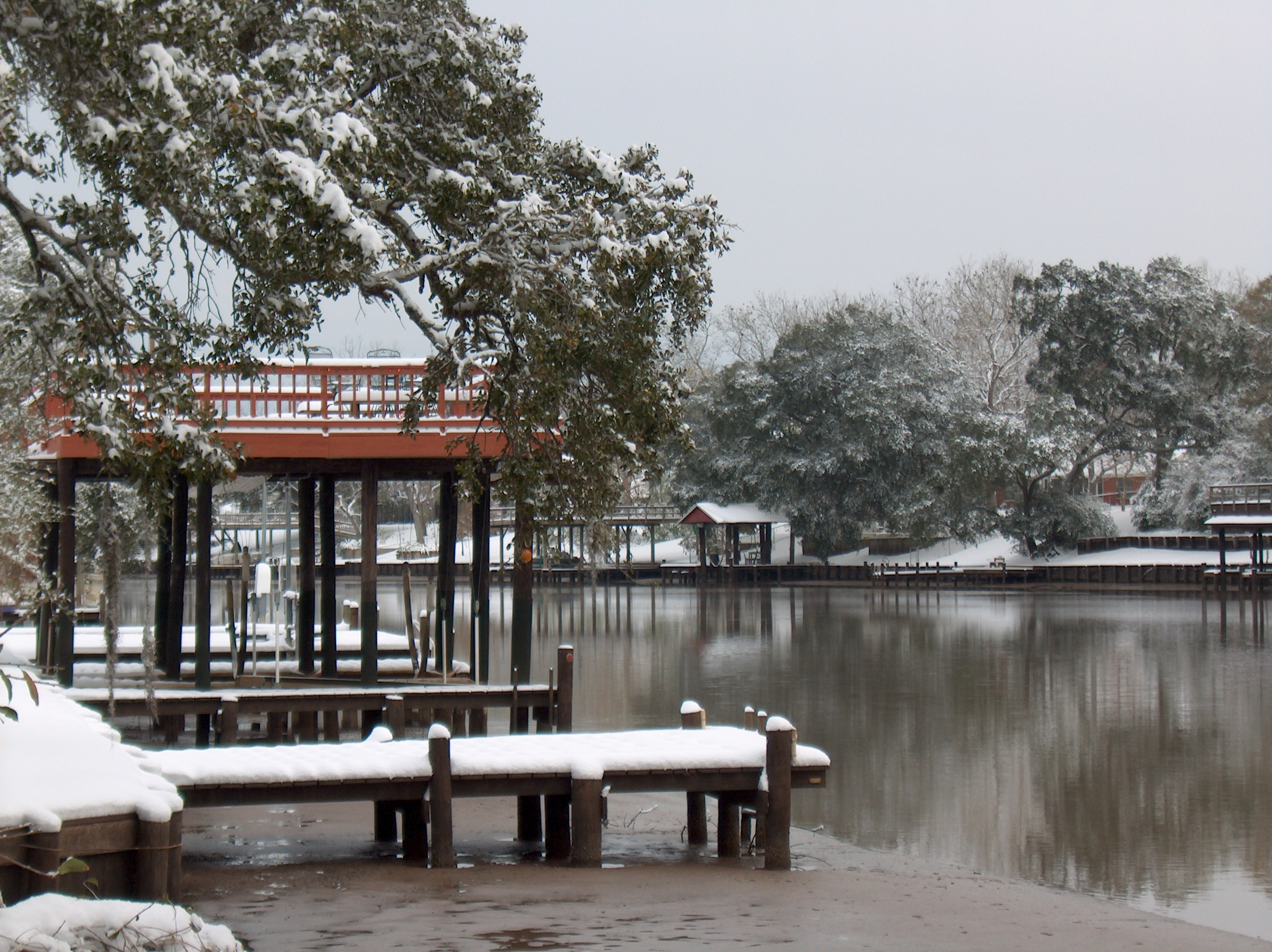
- San Bernard River after the 2004 Christmas Eve Snowstorm, a rarity in Texas

Location
- Country: United States
- State: Texas

Physical characteristics
- Source: New Ulm, Texas
- Mouth: Gulf of Mexico
- Basin size: 4,791 km^{2} (1,850 sq mi)

The San Bernard River is a river in Texas.

== Course ==
San Bernard River flows from a spring near New Ulm, Texas to its mouth on the Gulf of Mexico, some 120 miles (190 km) to the southeast of the source. It passes through portions of Austin, Brazoria, Colorado, Fort Bend, Matagorda and Wharton counties. It passes alongside the Attwater Prairie Chicken National Wildlife Refuge, which shelters one of the last populations of the critically endangered Attwater's prairie-chicken, a ground-dwelling grouse of the coastal prairie ecosystem.

The San Bernard River is one of a small number of rivers in Texas which empties directly into the Gulf. Its mouth was impeded in 2005 causing it to drain into the Gulf Intracoastal Waterway, but was later corrected. Shortly after being opened back up, the entrance silted in again, and remains so at this time.

== Watershed ==
The San Bernard drains approximately 1,850 square miles (4800 km^{2}) of land, and its basin area is home to approximately 87,000 people according to the 1990 census. The region was once the home of the Karankawa Indians. The river runs near several communities, including West Columbia, Texas and along the San Bernard National Wildlife Refuge. The basin receives approximately 35 to 70 inches (890 to 1,780 mm) of rainfall annually.

== See also ==
- List of rivers of Texas
- East Bernard, Texas
