= Steve Thurlow =

American football player (born 1942)

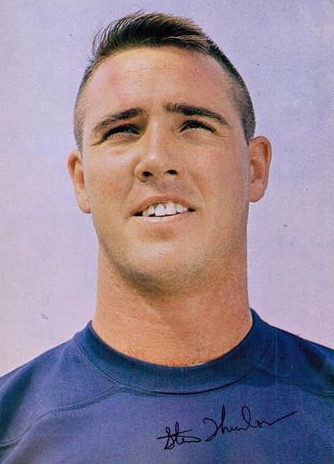

No. 27, 39, 44
- Position: Running back

Personal information
- Born: April 25, 1942 (age 84); Long Beach, California, U.S.
- Listed height: 6 ft 3 in (1.91 m)
- Listed weight: 222 lb (101 kg)

Career information
- High school: Escondido (Escondido, California)
- College: Stanford (1960-1963)
- NFL draft: 1964: 2nd round, 25th overall pick

Career history
- New York Giants (1964–1966); Washington Redskins (1966-1968)

Career NFL statistics
- Rushing yards: 1,127
- Rushing average: 3.6
- Receptions: 61
- Receiving yards: 539
- Total touchdowns: 6
- Stats at Pro Football Reference

Stephen Charles Thurlow (born April 25, 1942) is an American former professional football player who was a running back in the National Football League (NFL) for the New York Giants and the Washington Redskins. He played college football for the Stanford Cardinal. Thurlow was selected by the Giants in the 2nd round (25th overall) of the 1964 NFL draft.

Along with fellow Giants' running backs Tucker Frederickson, Chuck Mercein, and Ernie Koy Jr., Thurlow was part of a group called the "Baby Bulls" by the media and fans.

While playing for the Giants, he was offered a three-year contract at USD40,000 per year by the American Football League's San Diego Chargers. While admitting that he had held discussions with Charger's head coach Sid Gillman, Thurlow told the media that he intended to stay in New York.

Thurlow appeared as an imposter on the March 15, 1965 CBS television game show To Tell the Truth. Posing as a research volunteer who spent 30 days in bed in support of the NASA astronaut evaluation program, he received three votes.

Thurlow was traded by the Giants to the Washington Redskins on September 14, 1966 in exchange for Darrell Dess, an offensive lineman.

During a 2018 interview, Thurlow said he was ready to retire from football after he was traded from the Giants to the Redskins, but decided to continue playing, given the opportunity to work with Vince Lombardi who had recently been hired by Washington as their head coach.

“He’s the only reason I came back for my sixth season,” Thurlow said. “I wanted to see what it was like and what everyone was talking about when they said playing for him was very different than playing for anyone else. He became legendary in terms of success and how he ran a football team.”

At the time of the interview, Thurlow and his wife Chris were living in Vero Beach, Florida.
