= Buckhorn, Austin County, Texas =

- Unincorporated community
- Location within Texas Location within the United States
- Coordinates: 30.0385546°N 96.1999618°W
- Country: United States
- State: Texas
- County: Austin
- Elevation: 266 ft (81 m)
- Time zone: UTC-6 (Central (CST))
  - Summer (DST): UTC-5 (CDT)
- Area code: 979
- GNIS feature ID: 1378063

Buckhorn is an unincorporated community in Austin County, in the U.S. state of Texas. According to the Handbook of Texas, its population was 20 in 2000. It is located within the Greater Houston metropolitan area.

== Education ==
Buckhorn had its own school in 1880. It had 21 students enrolled in 1918. Today, the community is served by the Bellville Independent School District.
