= Rexville, Texas =

- unincorporated area
- Location within the state of Texas Rexville, Texas (the United States)
- Coordinates: 29°43′35″N 96°12′48″W
- Country: United States
- State: Texas
- County: Austin
- Elevation: 180 ft (55 m)
- Time zone: UTC-6 (Central (CST))
  - Summer (DST): UTC-5 (CDT)
- ZIP code: 77474
- Area code: 979

Rexville or Reckville was an unincorporated area in Austin County, in the U.S. state of Texas. The former location of the community, now a ghost town, is in a rural area between Sealy in Austin County and Eagle Lake in Colorado County. The name Rexville is still used to identify a United States Geological Survey (USGS) quadrangle map.

== Geography ==
The one-time community of Rexville was situated at 29°43′35″N 96°12′48″W on a former railroad right-of-way about 0.5 miles (0.8 km) north-northwest of the intersection of Rexville and Mieth Roads. This junction is located on Rexville Road 4.9 miles (7.9 km) southwest of Sealy and 1.5 miles (2.4 km) northwest of Farm to Market Road 3013 (FM 3013) on Mieth Road. The disused railroad right-of-way converges with Rexville Road about 0.5 miles (0.8 km) to the southwest of Rexville and Mieth. There is a large Wal-Mart distribution center to the northeast at FM 3013 and Farm to Market Road 3538. Rexville Road starts near U.S. Route 90 in Sealy and crosses Interstate 10 at a bridge near Sealy High School. There is no interchange. A short distance southwest of the overpass, the pavement ends and Rexville Road becomes gravel-topped. On the 1960 Rexville USGS 7.5' Quadrangle, Rexville is marked on a railroad siding beside a gravel pit on the west side of East Bernard Creek.

== History ==
The area was first settled by Anglo-Americans in the 1830s. Originally called Reckville, the settlement was founded by German immigrants in the 1870s about 6 miles (9.7 km) southwest of Sealy. In the 1880s, a spur line of the Gulf, Colorado and Santa Fe Railway was built between Sealy and Eagle Lake. Though the town became a flag stop on the railroad, few people moved there. The Rexville community never had a post office but got its mail from Sealy. By the 1950s there was nothing in the area but a triangulation station on the Atchison, Topeka and Santa Fe Railroad and a few farms. One source lists Rexville as a ghost town.

== Gallery ==
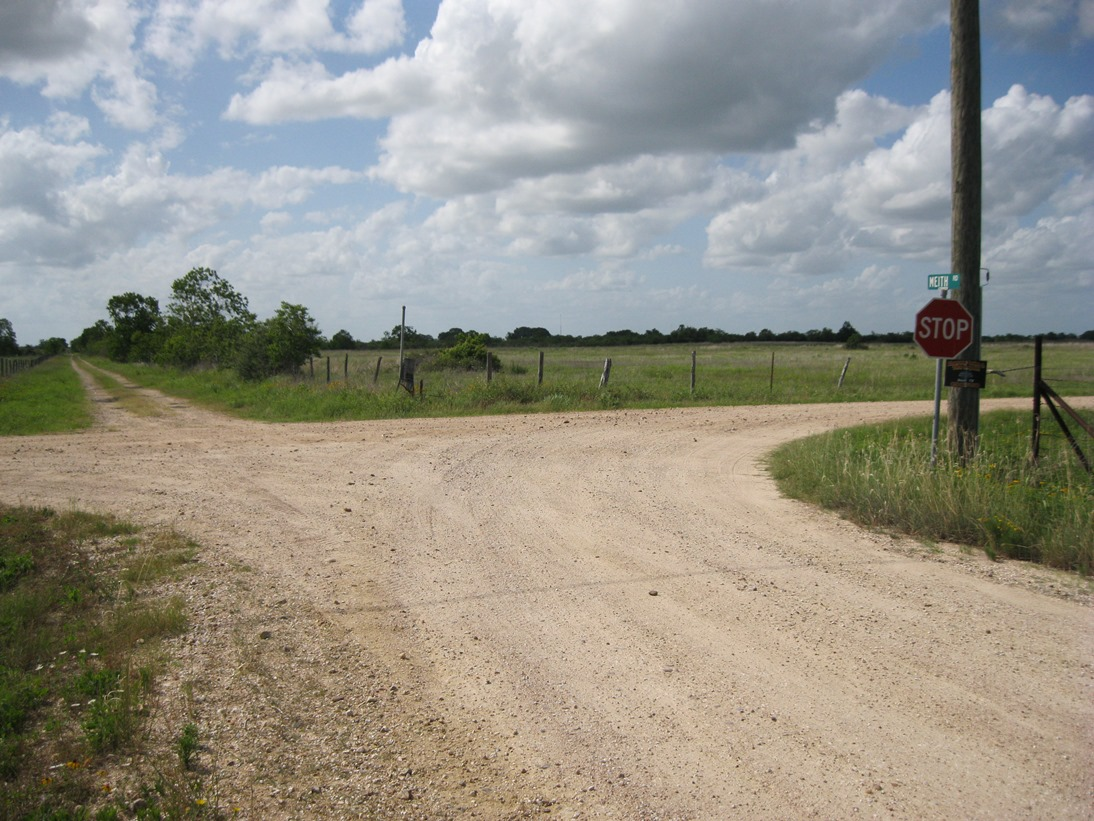
View is northwest at junction of Mieth and Rexville Rds. The railroad once followed the line of trees on the horizon.

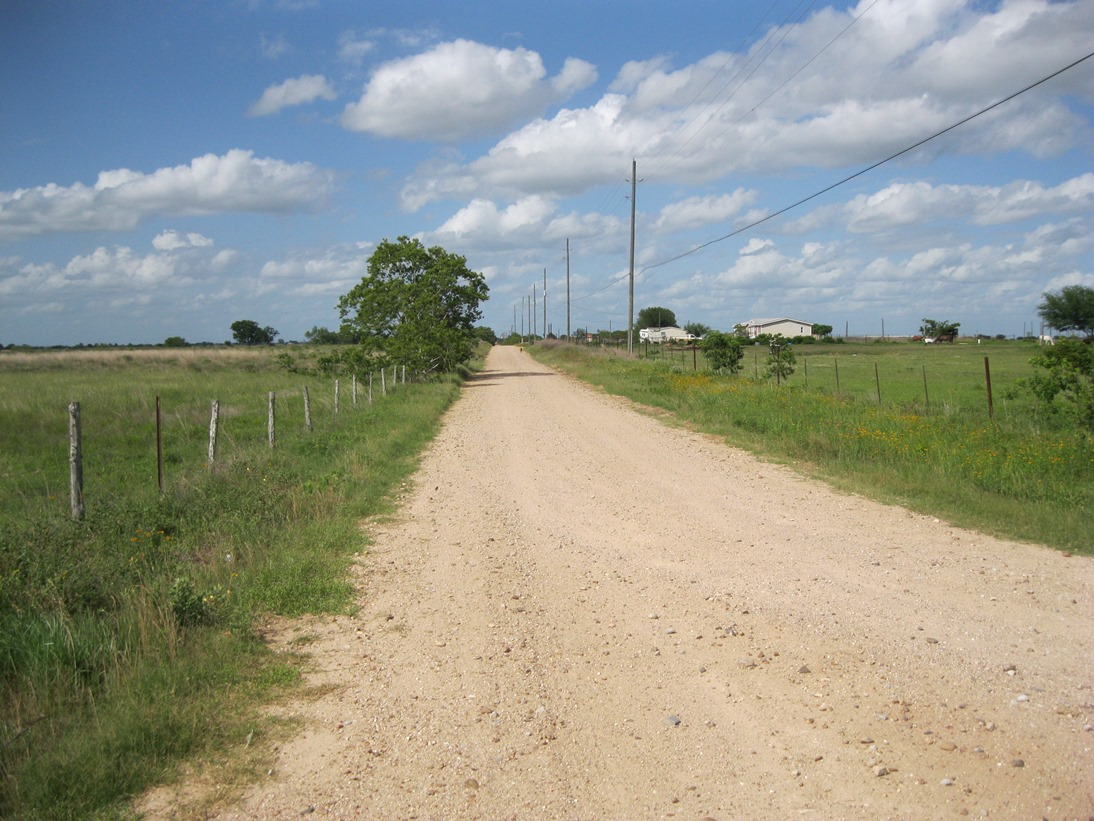
A few homes remain near the former site of Rexville. The view is northeast on Rexville Rd near Mieth Rd.

== See also ==
- U.S. Geological Survey Geographic Names Information System: Rexville, Texas
