= New Ulm, Texas =

Unincorporated community in Texas, US

New Ulm
- Unincorporated community
- New Ulm logo

- Location within the state of Texas New Ulm (the United States)
- Coordinates: 29°53′32″N 96°29′25″W
- Country: United States
- State: Texas
- County: Austin
- Time zone: UTC-6 (Central (CST))
  - Summer (DST): UTC-5 (CDT)
- ZIP codes: 78950
- GNIS feature ID: 1363801

New Ulm is an unincorporated community in Austin County, Texas, United States. As of the 2020 census, New Ulm had a population of 285.

== Geography ==
New Ulm is situated at the junction of Farm Roads 109 and 1094 in western Austin County, approximately 22 miles southwest of Bellville and 16 miles northeast of Columbus.

== History ==
The history of New Ulm dates back to the 1840s. It was founded in 1841 as Duff's Settlement, named for James C. Duff, who purchased the original land on which the town was built. This community sat approximately one mile north of the present New Ulm site. By the mid-1840s, the area grew as an influx of German-speaking settlers arrived from nearby communities such as Industry, Shelby, and Nassau Farm. After petitioning the government for a post office, one opened in 1852 under the name New Ulm – in commemoration of the well-known German city of Ulm, as many of the settlers came from that area. During the 1850s, New Ulm had six general stores, five blacksmiths, and three breweries. In 1867, a church building that doubled as a schoolhouse was built. The Missouri–Kansas–Texas (MKT) Railroad purchased farm land owned by local resident Franz Pille for a line extension and it arrived in 1892, further stimulating New Ulm's economy. An estimated 225 people were living in the community in 1898. At that time, a variety of businesses operated in New Ulm, including five general merchandise stores, a drug store, saddlery, cabinet shops, and a soda water factory.

A bank opened in 1906 and a newspaper – the New Ulm Enterprise – began publishing in 1910. On April 11, 1916, twenty-one men in the community met for the purpose of securing fire apparatus to protect local property. That led to the formation of the New Ulm Fire Company (now known as the New Ulm Volunteer Fire Department). A fire engine was purchased at a cost of $137.50. By 1930, New Ulm's population stood at around 500 with forty businesses operating in the community. The number of residents had fallen to 390 by 1950, but growth resumed during the 1960s, and in 1968, the population was estimated at 600. That figure had risen to 650 by 1990 and remained at that level through 2000. New Ulm has an active Chamber of Commerce and Lions Club.

Although New Ulm is unincorporated, it does have a post office with the zip code of 78950.

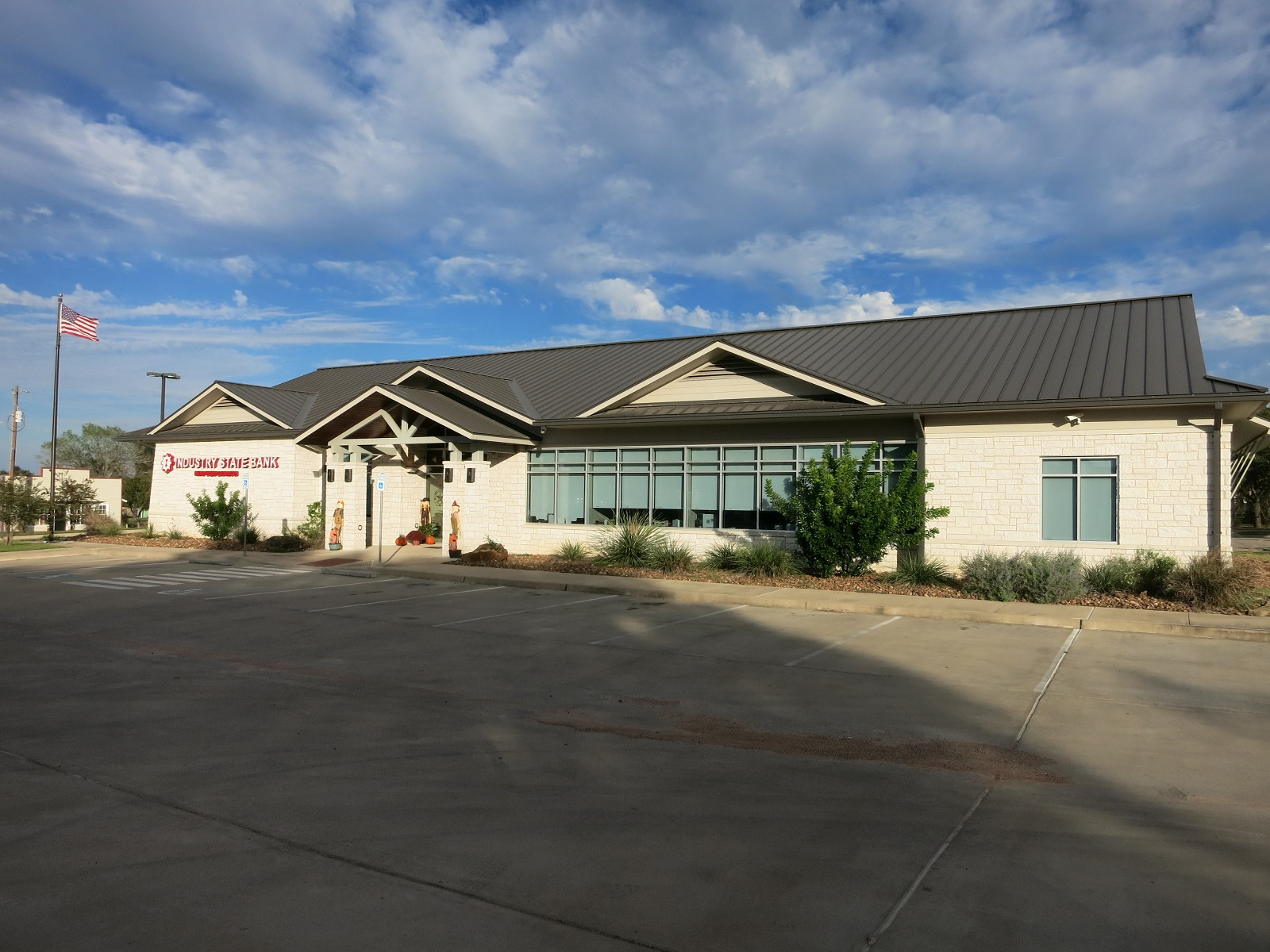
Industry State Bank is at FM 109 and FM 1094.

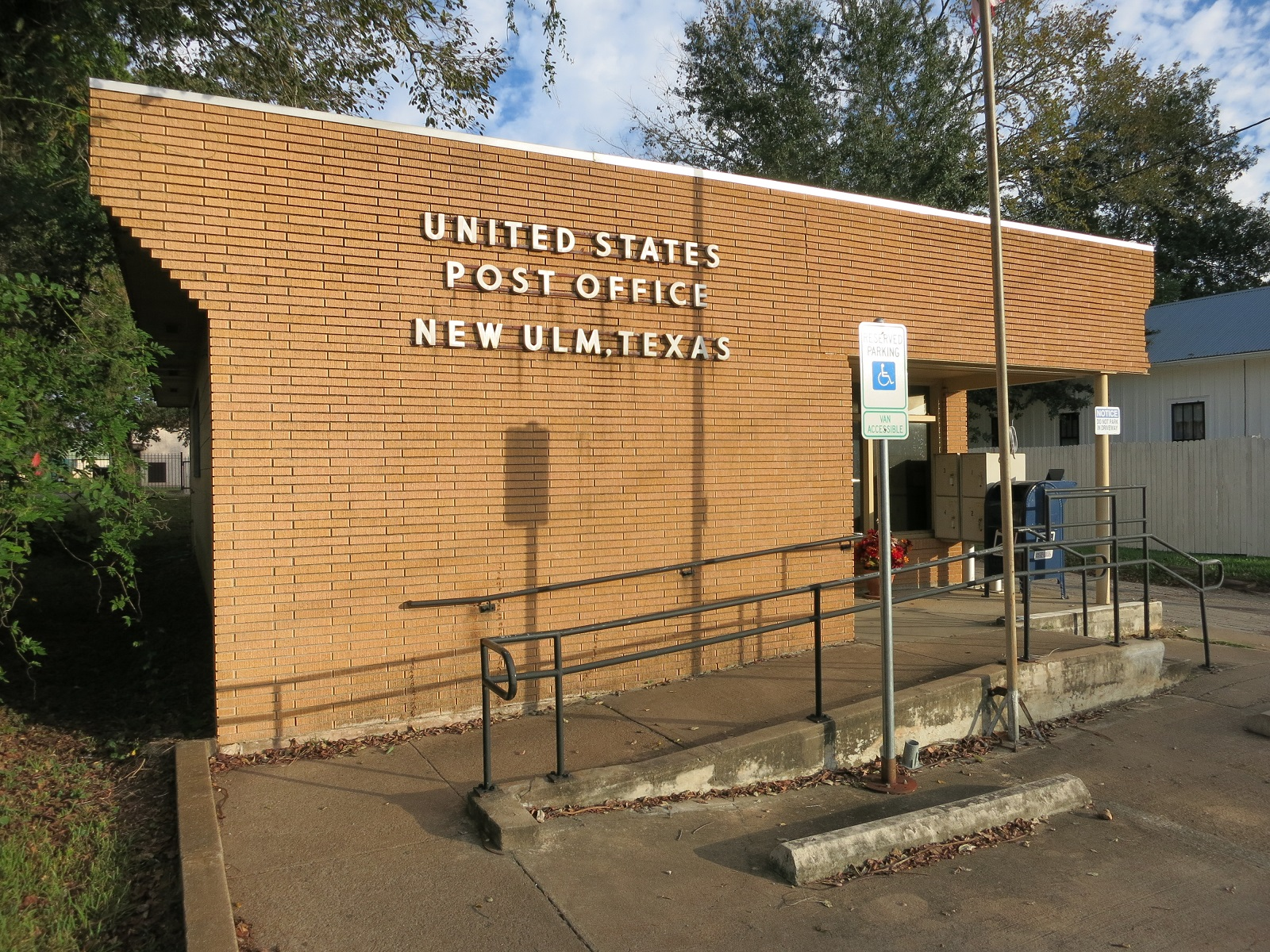
US Post Office, on Pecan Street.

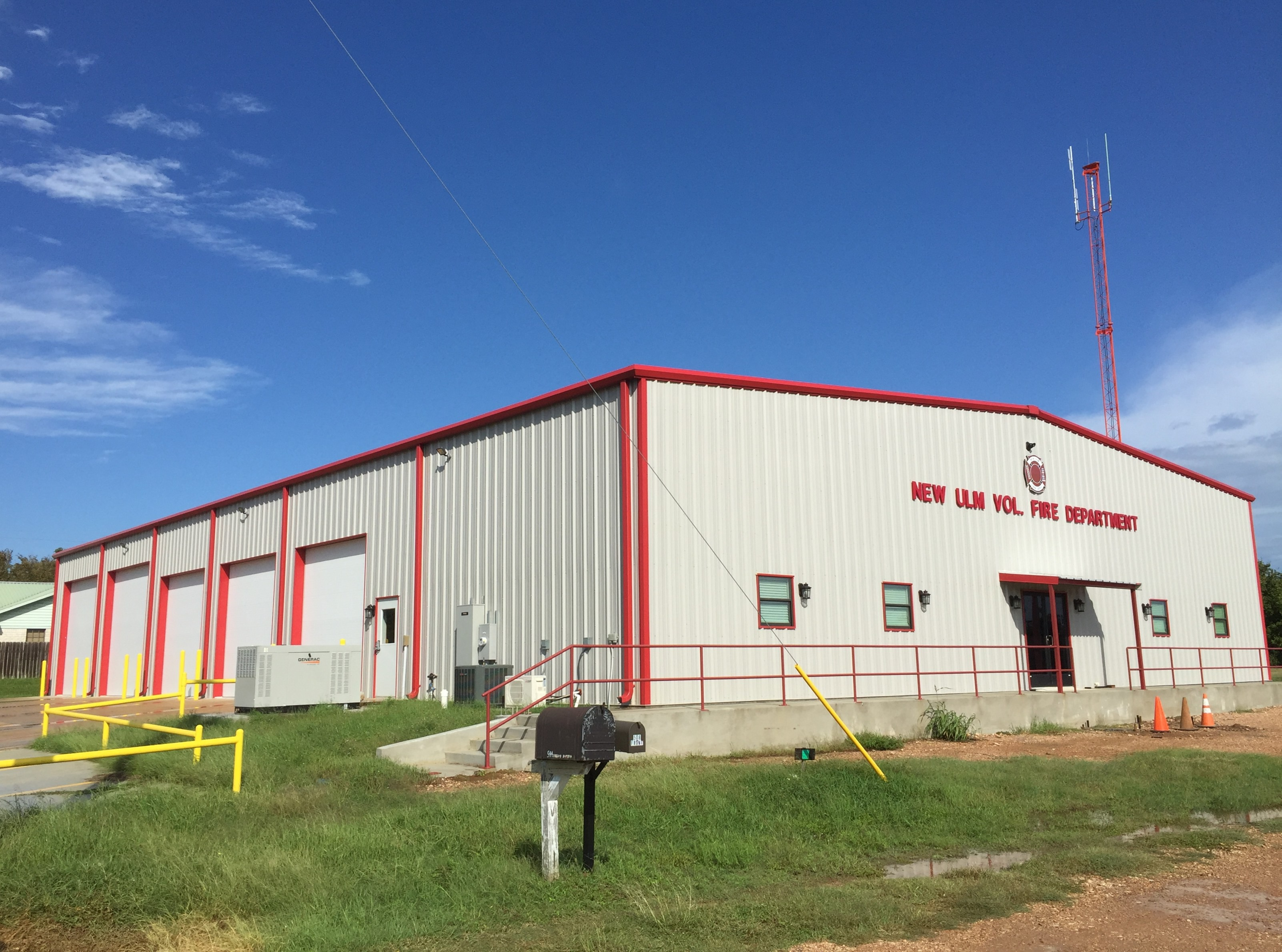
Volunteer Fire Department building, opened in 2018, on Walnut Street.

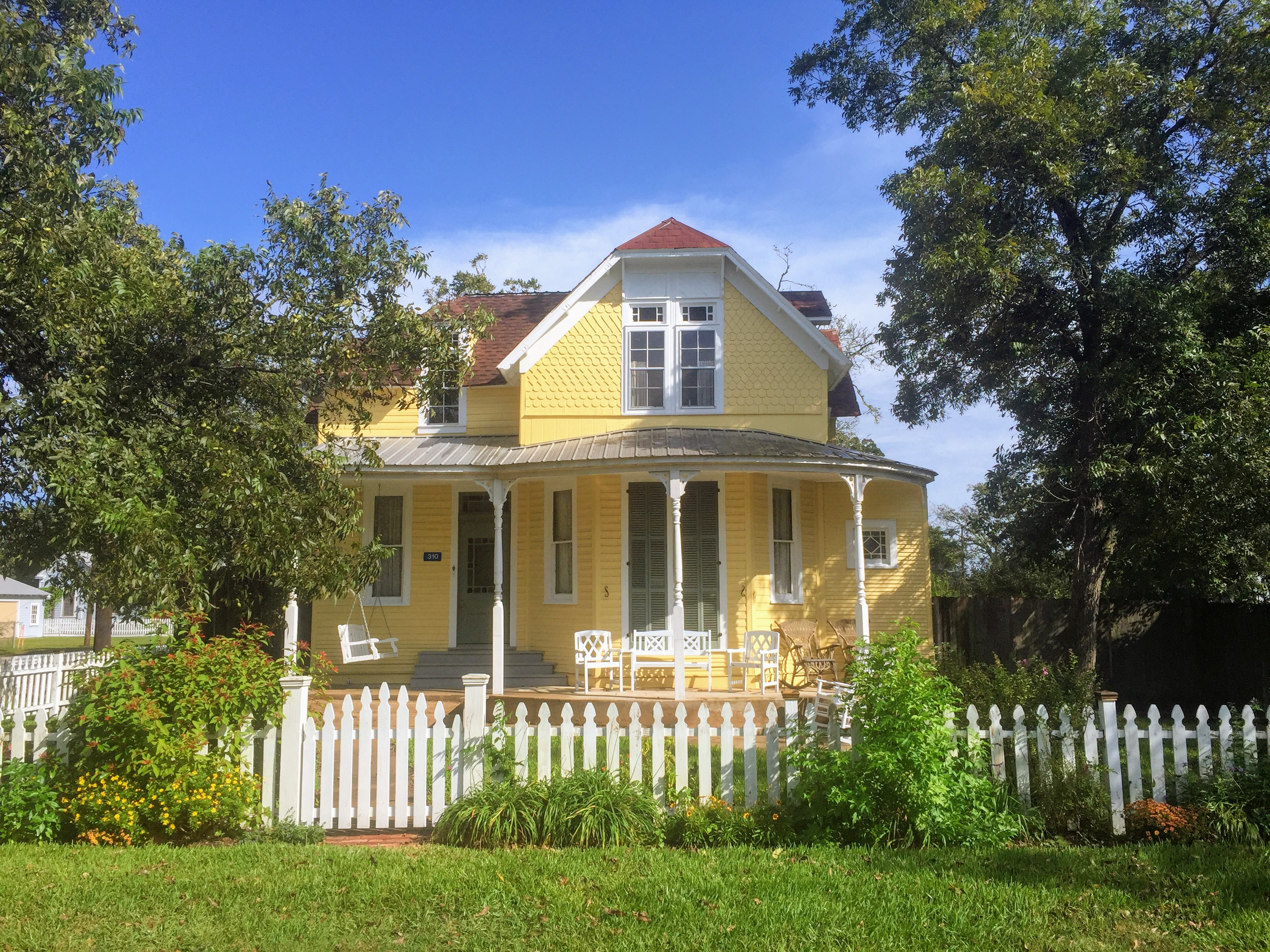
One of the few original buildings from the 1890s, built when the railway came to town.

== Demographics ==
Historical population
Census	Pop.	Note	%±
2020	285		—
U.S. Decennial Census; 1850–1900 1910; 1920 1930 1940; 1950 1960 1970; 1980 1990 2000; 2010 2020

New Ulm first appeared as a census-designated place in the 2020 U.S. census.

=== 2020 census ===
New Ulm CDP, Texas – Racial and ethnic composition Note: the US Census treats Hispanic/Latino as an ethnic category. This table excludes Latinos from the racial categories and assigns them to a separate category. Hispanics/Latinos may be of any race.
Race / Ethnicity (NH = Non-Hispanic)	Pop 2020	% 2020
White alone (NH)	221	77.54%
Black or African American alone (NH)	6	2.11%
Native American or Alaska Native alone (NH)	0	0.00%
Asian alone (NH)	0	0.00%
Native Hawaiian or Pacific Islander alone (NH)	0	0.00%
Other race alone (NH)	1	0.35%
Mixed race or Multiracial (NH)	3	1.05%
Hispanic or Latino (any race)	54	18.95%
Total	285	100.00%

== Education ==
Public education in the community of New Ulm is provided by the Columbus Independent School District, which is headquartered in the Colorado County city of Columbus.
