= Quarry, Texas =

Unincorporated community in Texas, US

Quarry is an unincorporated community in northern Washington County, Texas, United States. It lies along State Highway 36, northwest of the city of Brenham, the county seat of Washington County. Its elevation is 256 feet (78 m), and it is located at 30°18′28″N 96°30′38″W (30.3077111, -96.5105241). Named for local quarries, the community was built along the Gulf, Colorado and Santa Fe Railway. In 1891, a post office was opened in Quarry. As the years passed, Quarry declined, in part due to the decreasing importance of its mining economy; its post office closed in 1905. Ranching has been the mainstay of the community in recent years.
