= Industry, Texas =

Industry, Texas 78944
- Town
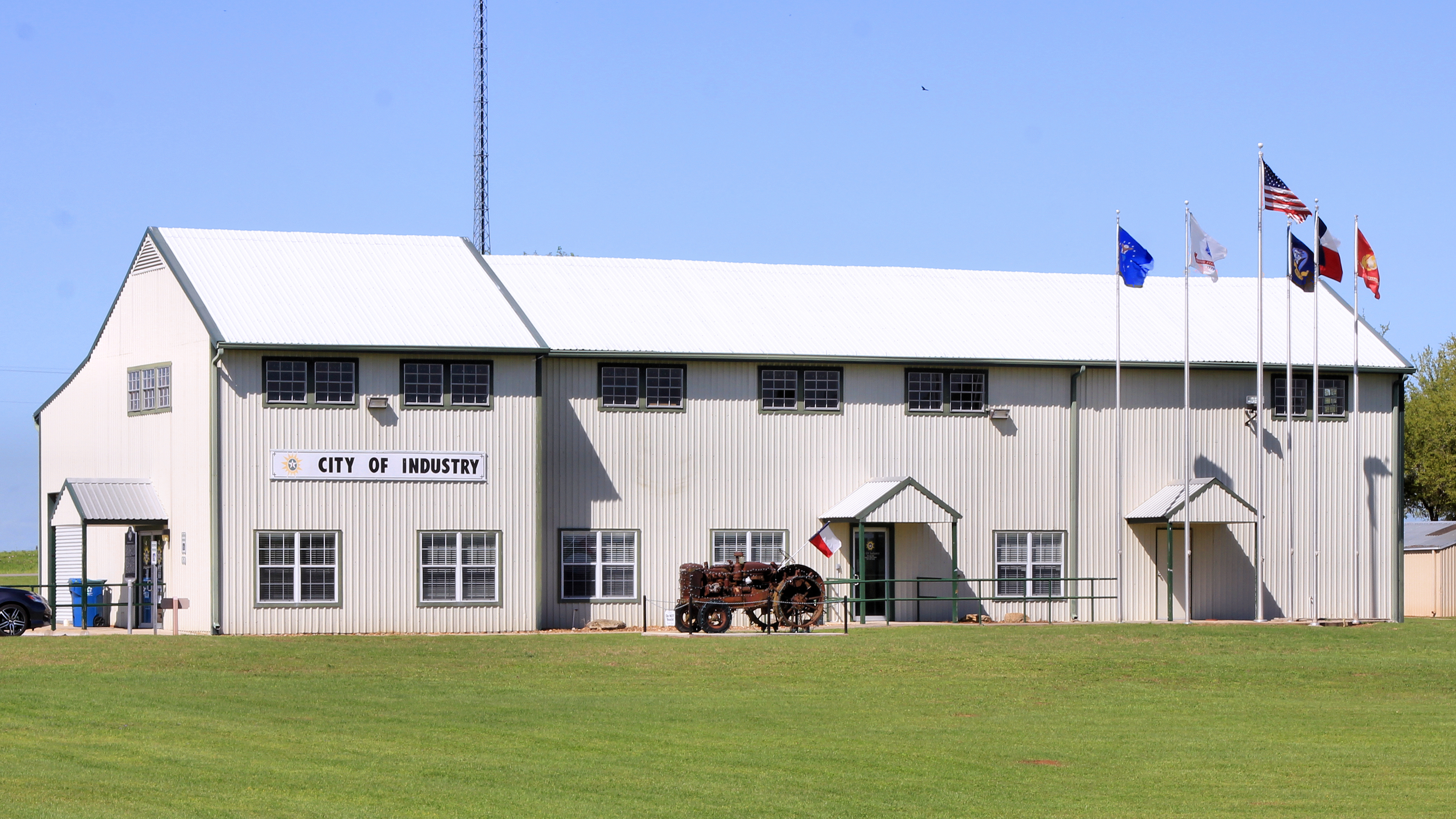
- Industry City Hall

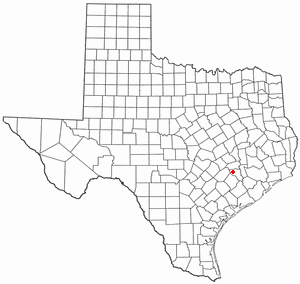
- Location of Industry, Texas

- Coordinates: 29°58′3″N 96°29′50″W
- Country: United States
- State: Texas
- County: Austin

Government
  - Mayor: Mable Meyers

Area
  - Total: 1.08 sq mi (2.80 km^{2})
  - Land: 1.07 sq mi (2.76 km^{2})
  - Water: 0.015 sq mi (0.04 km^{2})
- Elevation: 312 ft (95 m)

Population (2020)
  - Total: 268
  - Density: 304.7/sq mi (117.64/km^{2})
- Time zone: UTC-6 (Central (CST))
  - Summer (DST): UTC-5 (CDT)
- ZIP code: 78944
- Area code: 979
- FIPS code: 48-35984
- GNIS feature ID: 1360006
- Website: www.industrytexas.com

Industry is a town in Austin County, Texas, United States, at the junction of State Highway 159 (SH 159) and Farm to Market Road 109 (FM 109). The population was 268 at the 2020 census. Industry was the first permanent German settlement in Texas. Friedrich Ernst, Industry's founder, settled here in 1831 and gained Industry the title "Cradle of German Settlement in Texas" (see German Texan).

The community was so named on account of the industrious character of the first settlers.

== Geography ==
Industry is located at 29°58′3″N 96°29′50″W (29.967368, –96.497089) at the intersection of east-west running SH 159 and FM 109 which goes north and south. The county seat at Bellville is 15.6 miles (25.1 km) east-southeast on SH 159 while Fayetteville is 12.6 miles (20.3 km) west-southwest on the same highway. New Ulm is 5.8 miles (9.3 km) to the south on FM 109, while a trip 13.3 miles (21.4 km) to the north and northeast on the same road will take one to State Highway 36 in Brenham. West End Elementary School is within the city limits.

According to the United States Census Bureau, the city has a total area of 1.08 square miles (2.80 km^{2}), of which 1.07 square miles (2.76 km^{2}) is land and 0.015 square miles (0.04 km^{2}), or 1.33%, is water.

== Demographics ==
Historical population
Census	Pop.	Note	%±
2000	304		—
2010	304		0.0%
2020	268		−11.8%
U.S. Decennial Census

Industry racial composition as of 2020 (NH = Non-Hispanic) (Note: Note: the US Census treats Hispanic/Latino as an ethnic category. This table excludes Latinos from the racial categories and assigns them to a separate category. Hispanics/Latinos can be of any race.)
Race	Number	Percentage
White (NH)	150	55.97%
Black or African American (NH)	41	15.3%
Native American or Alaska Native (NH)	1	0.37%
Some Other Race (NH)	18	6.72%
Mixed/Multi-Racial (NH)	8	2.99%
Hispanic or Latino	50	18.66%
Total	268	

As of the 2020 United States census, there were 268 people, 119 households, and 94 families residing in the city.

As of the census of 2000, there were 304 persons, 142 households, and 84 families residing in the city. The population density was 291.0 inhabitants per square mile (112.4/km^{2}). There were 142 housing units at an average density of 135.9 per square mile (52.5/km^{2}). The racial makeup of the city was 69.41% White, 19.74% African American, 9.21% from other races, and 1.64% from two or more races. Hispanic or Latino of any race were 10.53% of the population.

There were 119 households, out of which 32.8% had children under the age of 18 living with them, 56.3% were married couples living together, 9.2% had a female householder with no husband present, and 29.4% were non-families. 26.9% of all households were made up of individuals, and 16.0% had someone living alone who was 65 years of age or older. The average household size was 2.55 and the average family size was 3.11.

In the city, the population was spread out, with 26.0% under the age of 18, 9.5% from 18 to 24, 23.7% from 25 to 44, 24.0% from 45 to 64, and 16.8% who were 65 years of age or older. The median age was 38 years. For every 100 females, there were 101.3 males. For every 100 females age 18 and over, there were 94.0 males.

The median income for a household in the city was $30,625, and the median income for a family was $38,750. Males had a median income of $25,500 versus $23,542 for females. The per capita income for the city was $13,294. About 15.8% of families and 22.4% of the population were below the poverty line, including 31.6% of those under the age of eighteen and 28.6% of those 65 or over.

== Education ==
Industry is within the Bellville Independent School District.

Industry students are zoned to West End Elementary School, Bellville Junior High School, and Bellville High School.

== Notable person ==
- Lucas Luetge, major league baseball pitcher
