= Ernie Koy =

American baseball player (1909–2007)

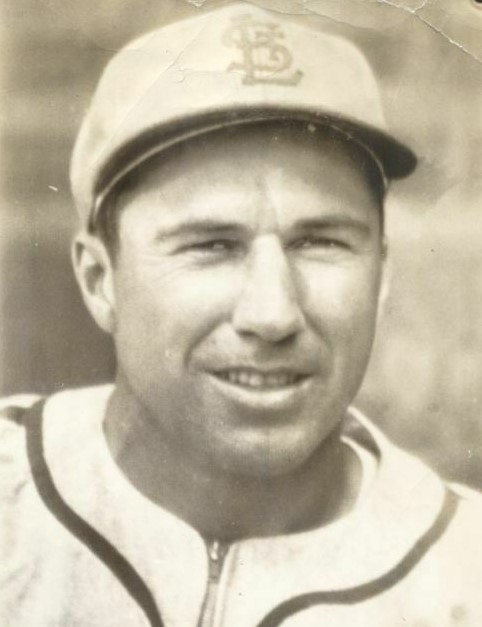
- Outfielder
- Born: September 17, 1909; Sealy, Texas, U.S.
- Died: January 1, 2007 (aged 97); Bellville, Texas, U.S.
- Batted: Right Threw: Right

MLB debut
- April 19, 1938, for the Brooklyn Dodgers

Last MLB appearance
- September 27, 1942, for the Philadelphia Phillies

MLB statistics
- Batting average: .279
- Home runs: 36
- Runs batted in: 260
- Stats at Baseball Reference

Teams
- Brooklyn Dodgers (1938–1940); St. Louis Cardinals (1940–1941); Cincinnati Reds (1941–1942); Philadelphia Phillies (1942)

Ernest Anyz Koy (September 17, 1909 – January 1, 2007), nicknamed "Chief", was an American left fielder in Major League Baseball, who played for four National League teams from 1938 to 1942. He was born in Sealy, Texas and was of American Indian ancestry. He attended the University of Texas at Austin (UT). While at UT he was a fullback on the football team from 1930 to 1932. He played as an outfielder on the baseball team from 1931 to 1933 and served as captain in 1933. In 1960, he was inducted into the University of Texas Longhorn Hall of Fame.

== Major League Baseball career ==
After signing with the New York Yankees, Koy's contract was sold to the Brooklyn Dodgers on April 15, 1938. He hit a home run in his first at bat with the Dodgers on April 19, and played 142 games that season as an outfielder and one game as a third baseman. Koy finished the year ranking second in the NL with 15 stolen bases, and ninth with a .468 slugging average. He appeared in 125 games during the 1939 season, and 24 during the 1940 season as an outfielder. In 1940, Koy batted .301 for the Dodgers. He was traded on June 12, 1940 to the St. Louis Cardinals with Bert Haas, Sam Nahem and Carl Doyle and $125,000 for Curt "Coonskin" Davis and Joe "Ducky" Medwick. Koy played 91 games as an outfielder with the Cardinals in 1940, and 12 games of the 1941 season with the Cardinals. He was traded from the Cardinals to the Cincinnati Reds on May 14, 1941. Koy played 49 games of the remaining 1941 season in a Reds uniform. He was sold by the Reds to the Philadelphia Phillies on May 2, 1942. Koy appeared in 78 games with the Phillies, and was eventually released from his contract May 27, 1946 after serving in the Navy during World War II. He ended his career with a .279 batting average, 36 home runs, 260 runs batted in, 238 runs, 515 hits and 40 stolen bases in 558 games.

== Personal life ==
His son Ernie Koy Jr. starred on the 1963 National Champion Texas Longhorn football team. He later played professional football for the New York Giants from 1965 to 1970. His youngest son Ted Koy played for the college national champion Texas Longhorns in 1969 and went on to play with the Oakland Raiders and Buffalo Bills. His daughter Margaret Koy Kistler (August 14, 1944 – February 22, 2008) was one of the first female sportswriters in Texas. Koy died at age 97 at his home in Bellville, Texas, one month after breaking his hip. He is buried at Oak Knoll Cemetery in Bellville.

== See also ==
- List of Major League Baseball players with a home run in their first major league at bat
