= Bellville High School =

Public school in Texas, United States

Location
- 850 Schumann Rd; Bellville, Austin County, Texas 77418-1599; United States; 29.9248°N 96.2519°W

Information
- School type: Public, high school
- Motto: Learners Today, Leaders Tomorrow
- Locale: Town: Distant
- School district: Bellville ISD
- NCES School ID: 480981000449
- Principal: James Dristas
- Staff: 52.48 (on an FTE basis)
- Grades: 9–12
- Enrollment: 742 (2023–2024)
- Student to teacher ratio: 14.14
- Colors: Red & White
- Athletics conference: UIL Class 4A
- Mascot: Brahmas/Brahmanettes
- Website: Bellville High School

Bellville High School is a public high school located in the city of Bellville, Texas in Austin County, United States and classified as a 4A school by the University Interscholastic League (UIL). It is a part of the Bellville Independent School District located in central Austin County. During 2022–2023, Bellville High School had an enrollment of 698 students and a student to teacher ratio of 14.30. The school received an overall rating of "B" from the Texas Education Agency for the 2024–2025 school year.

== Athletics ==
The Bellville Brahmas compete in these sports:

- Baseball
- Basketball
- Cross Country
- Football
- Golf
- Powerlifting
- Softball
- Tennis
- Track and Field
- Volleyball
- Soccer

=== State Titles ===
- Baseball –
  - 1993(3A)
- Girls Track –
  - 1976(2A)
  - 1978(2A)
- Volleyball –
  - 1984(3A)
  - 1986(3A)
  - 1990(3A)
  - 1991(3A)
  - 1993(3A)
  - 1995(3A)
  - 1996(3A)
  - 1997(3A)
  - 2005(3A)

== Notable alumni ==
- Lucas Luetge (born March 24, 1987) is a professional baseball player for the New York Yankees of Major League Baseball.
- Richard Reese is a college football running back for the Baylor Bears.
- Emmanuel Sanders (born March 17, 1987) is a former American football wide receiver for the National Football League.
