= Austin County, Texas =

County in Texas, United States

- County
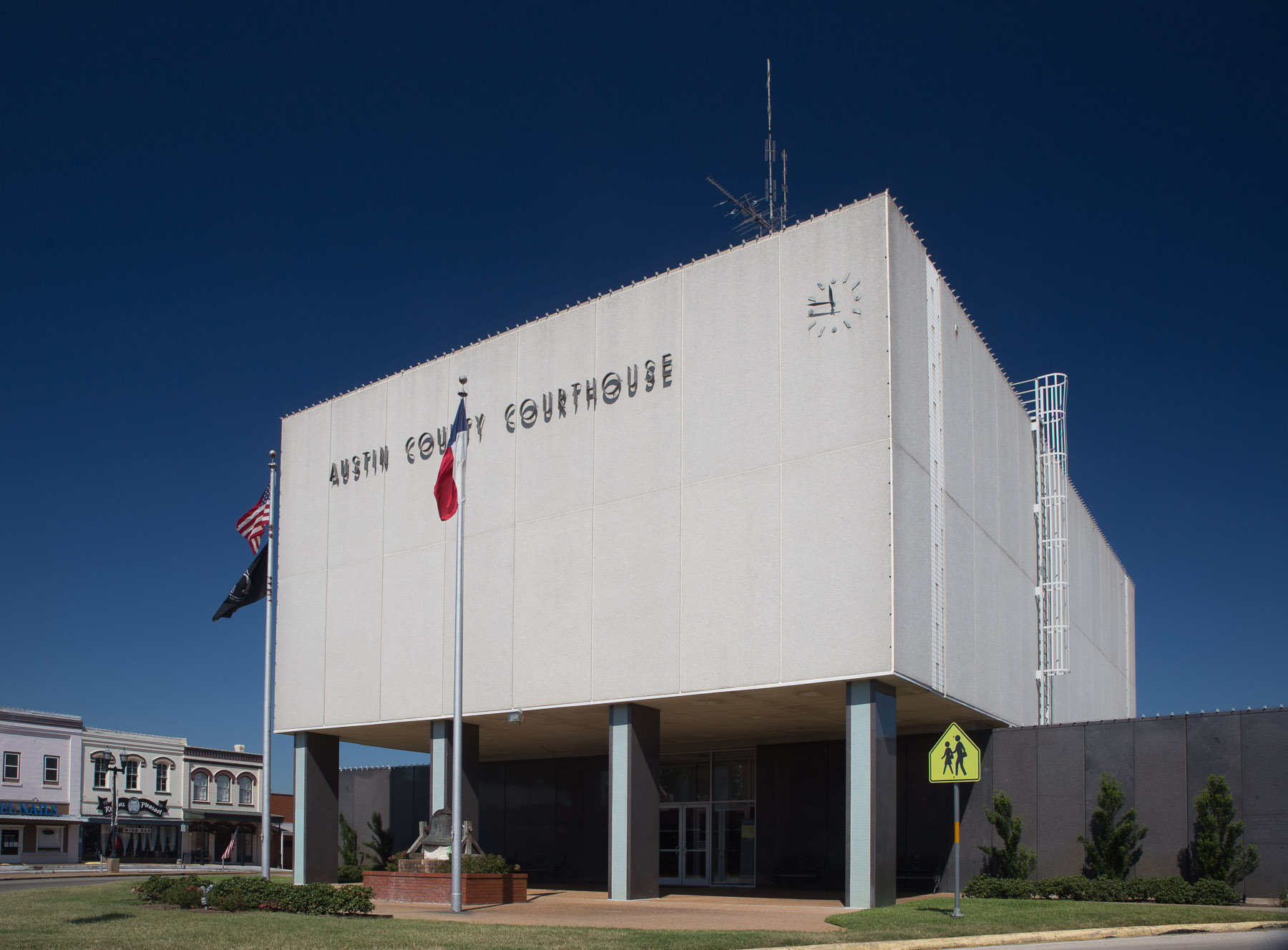
- The Austin County Courthouse in Bellville

- Flag

- Location within the U.S. state of Texas
- Coordinates: 29°53′N 96°17′W
- Country: United States
- State: Texas
- Founded: 1837
- Named for: Stephen F. Austin
- Seat: Bellville
- Largest city: Sealy

Area
  - Total: 656 sq mi (1,700 km^{2})
  - Land: 647 sq mi (1,680 km^{2})
  - Water: 9.9 sq mi (26 km^{2}) 1.5%

Population (2020)
  - Total: 30,167
  - Estimate (2025): 33,625 ▲
  - Density: 46.6/sq mi (18.0/km^{2})
- Time zone: UTC−6 (Central)
  - Summer (DST): UTC−5 (CDT)
- Congressional district: 10th
- Website: www.austincounty.com

Austin County is a rural, agricultural dominated county in the U.S. state of Texas. As of the 2020 census, its population was 30,167. Its county seat is Bellville. The county and region were settled primarily by German immigrants in the 1800s.

Austin County is included in the Houston–Pasadena–The Woodlands metropolitan statistical area. Austin County and the state capital Austin were both named after Stephen F. Austin; the city Austin is in Travis County, about 110 miles to the northwest.

== History ==
In 1836, the Texas Legislature established Austin County, naming it for Stephen F. Austin, who facilitated Texas' Anglo-American colonization.

== Geography ==
According to the U.S. Census Bureau, the county has a total area of 656 square miles (1,700 km^{2}), of which 9.9 square miles (26 km^{2}) (1.5%) are covered by water.

=== Adjacent counties ===
- Washington County (north)
- Waller County (east)
- Fort Bend County (southeast)
- Wharton County (south)
- Colorado County (southwest)
- Fayette County (west)

== Communities ==
=== Cities ===
- Bellville (county seat)
- Brazos Country
- Sealy
- South Frydek
- Wallis

=== Towns ===
- Industry
- San Felipe

=== Census-designated place ===
- New Ulm

=== Unincorporated communities ===
- Bleiblerville
- Buckhorn
- Burleigh
- Cat Spring
- Cochran
- Frydek
- Kenney
- Millheim
- Nelsonville
- New Wehdem
- Peters
- Post Oak Point
- Raccoon Bend
- Rockhouse
- Shelby
- Wehdem
- Welcome

=== Ghost town ===
- Rexville

== Demographics ==
Historical population
Census	Pop.	Note	%±
1850	3,841		—
1860	10,139		164.0%
1870	15,087		48.8%
1880	14,429		−4.4%
1890	17,859		23.8%
1900	20,676		15.8%
1910	17,699		−14.4%
1920	18,874		6.6%
1930	18,860		−0.1%
1940	17,384		−7.8%
1950	14,663		−15.7%
1960	13,777		−6.0%
1970	13,831		0.4%
1980	17,726		28.2%
1990	19,832		11.9%
2000	23,590		18.9%
2010	28,417		20.5%
2020	30,167		6.2%
2025 (est.)	33,625	▲	11.5%
U.S. Decennial Census; 1850–1900 1910; 1920 1930 1940 1950 1960 1970 1980 1990 2000; 2010 2020

=== Racial and ethnic composition ===
Austin County, Texas – Racial and ethnic composition Note: the US Census treats Hispanic/Latino as an ethnic category. This table excludes Latinos from the racial categories and assigns them to a separate category. Hispanics/Latinos may be of any race.
Race / Ethnicity (NH = Non-Hispanic)	Pop 1980	Pop 1990	Pop 2000	Pop 2010	Pop 2020	% 1980	% 1990	% 2000	% 2010	% 2020
White alone (NH)	14,091	15,125	16,964	18,657	18,480	79.49%	76.27%	71.91%	65.65%	61.26%
Black or African American alone (NH)	2,564	2,556	2,475	2,622	2,352	14.46%	12.89%	10.49%	9.23%	7.80%
Native American or Alaska Native alone (NH)	40	46	47	79	78	0.23%	0.23%	0.20%	0.28%	0.26%
Asian alone (NH)	14	26	68	110	201	0.08%	0.13%	0.29%	0.39%	0.67%
Native Hawaiian or Pacific Islander alone (NH)	x	x	1	1	8	x	x	0.00%	0.00%	0.03%
Other race alone (NH)	28	6	34	36	107	0.16%	0.03%	0.14%	0.13%	0.35%
Mixed race or Multiracial (NH)	x	x	196	271	889	x	x	0.83%	0.95%	2.95%
Hispanic or Latino (any race)	989	2,073	3,805	6,641	8,052	5.58%	10.45%	16.13%	23.37%	26.69%
Total	17,726	19,832	23,590	28,417	30,167	100.00%	100.00%	100.00%	100.00%	100.00%

=== 2020 census ===
As of the 2020 census, the county had a population of 30,167. The median age was 42.8 years. 23.2% of residents were under the age of 18 and 20.7% of residents were 65 years of age or older. For every 100 females there were 98.1 males, and for every 100 females age 18 and over there were 96.1 males age 18 and over.

The racial makeup of the county was 66.8% White, 8.1% Black or African American, 0.9% American Indian and Alaska Native, 0.7% Asian, <0.1% Native Hawaiian and Pacific Islander, 10.3% from some other race, and 13.2% from two or more races. Hispanic or Latino residents of any race comprised 26.7% of the population.

21.2% of residents lived in urban areas, while 78.8% lived in rural areas.

There were 11,618 households in the county, of which 31.2% had children under the age of 18 living in them. Of all households, 53.9% were married-couple households, 17.6% were households with a male householder and no spouse or partner present, and 23.8% were households with a female householder and no spouse or partner present. About 25.9% of all households were made up of individuals and 13.4% had someone living alone who was 65 years of age or older.

There were 13,779 housing units, of which 15.7% were vacant. Among occupied housing units, 76.5% were owner-occupied and 23.5% were renter-occupied. The homeowner vacancy rate was 1.8% and the rental vacancy rate was 10.7%.

=== 2000 census ===
As of the 2000 census, 23,590 people, 8,747 households, and 6,481 families resided in the county. The population density was 36 people per square mile (14 people/km^{2}). The 10,205 housing units averaged 16 units per square mile (6.2/km^{2}). The racial makeup of the county was 80.22% White, 10.64% African American, 0.28% Native American, 0.29% Asian, 6.99% from other races, and 1.58% from two or more races. About 16.13% of the population was Hispanic or Latino of any race, and 26.9% were of German, 8.0% Czech, 6.4% English, and 5.0% Irish ancestry according to Census 2000.

Of the 8,747 households, 34.70% had children under 18 living with them, 60.60% were married couples living together, 9.60% had a female householder with no husband present, and 25.90% were not families; 22.80% of all households were made up of individuals, and 11.50% had someone living alone who was 65 or older. The average household size was 2.67 and the average family size was 3.14.

In the county, the population was distributed as 27.0% under the age of 18, 8.1% from 18 to 24, 26.4% from 25 to 44, 23.7% from 45 to 64, and 14.8% who were 65 or older. The median age was 38 years. For every 100 females, there were 96.5 males. For every 100 females 18 and over, there were 92.9 males.

The median income for a household in the county was $38,615, and for a family was $46,342. Males had a median income of $32,455 versus $22,142 for females. The per capita income for the county was $18,140. About 8.80% of families and 12.10% of the population were below the poverty line, including 13.70% of those under age 18 and 14.40% of those age 65 or over.

== Politics ==
United States presidential election results for Austin County, Texas
Year	Republican		Democratic		Third party(ies)	
Year	No.	%	No.	%	No.	%
1912	244	16.43%	1,161	78.18%	80	5.39%
1916	673	40.96%	960	58.43%	10	0.61%
1920	568	19.65%	538	18.62%	1,784	61.73%
1924	457	12.60%	2,601	71.71%	569	15.69%
1928	466	17.94%	2,129	81.98%	2	0.08%
1932	142	4.81%	2,806	94.96%	7	0.24%
1936	290	15.03%	1,635	84.76%	4	0.21%
1940	1,400	49.88%	1,404	50.02%	3	0.11%
1944	619	19.44%	1,316	41.33%	1,249	39.23%
1948	1,260	43.98%	1,252	43.70%	353	12.32%
1952	2,964	67.17%	1,445	32.74%	4	0.09%
1956	2,501	67.12%	1,215	32.61%	10	0.27%
1960	1,978	52.92%	1,725	46.15%	35	0.94%
1964	1,545	39.46%	2,365	60.41%	5	0.13%
1968	1,971	45.27%	1,299	29.83%	1,084	24.90%
1972	3,084	74.24%	1,043	25.11%	27	0.65%
1976	2,686	53.37%	2,313	45.96%	34	0.68%
1980	3,734	64.91%	1,893	32.90%	126	2.19%
1984	4,872	71.29%	1,941	28.40%	21	0.31%
1988	4,524	63.18%	2,593	36.22%	43	0.60%
1992	4,015	50.89%	2,278	28.87%	1,597	20.24%
1996	4,669	58.36%	2,719	33.98%	613	7.66%
2000	6,661	72.19%	2,407	26.09%	159	1.72%
2004	8,072	75.43%	2,582	24.13%	48	0.45%
2008	8,786	74.96%	2,821	24.07%	114	0.97%
2012	9,265	79.53%	2,252	19.33%	132	1.13%
2016	9,637	78.52%	2,320	18.90%	317	2.58%
2020	11,447	78.48%	2,951	20.23%	188	1.29%
2024	12,457	80.98%	2,816	18.31%	110	0.72%

United States Senate election results for Austin County, Texas1
Year	Republican		Democratic		Third party(ies)	
Year	No.	%	No.	%	No.	%
2024	11,981	78.36%	2,998	19.61%	310	2.03%

United States Senate election results for Austin County, Texas2
Year	Republican		Democratic		Third party(ies)	
Year	No.	%	No.	%	No.	%
2020	11,454	79.10%	2,752	19.00%	275	1.90%

Texas Gubernatorial election results for Austin County
Year	Republican		Democratic		Third party(ies)	
Year	No.	%	No.	%	No.	%
2022	9,209	82.19%	1,873	16.72%	123	1.10%

Austin County was one of the earliest counties in Texas to turn Republican. After 1944, the only time a Democrat has carried this county is in 1964. Every Republican presidential candidate since 2000 has carried more than 70% of the county vote.

=== United States Congress ===
Austin County is part of Texas's 10th congressional district, which as of 2019 is represented in the United States House of Representatives by Michael McCaul.

=== Texas Legislature ===
==== Texas Senate ====
District 18: Lois Kolkhorst (R) – first elected in 2014

==== Texas House of Representatives ====
District 13: Ben Leman (R) – first elected in 2018

=== Austin County Courthouse ===
County judge: Tim Lapham (R)

Tax assessor-collector: Kim Rinn (R)

== Education ==
These school districts serve Austin County:

- Bellville Independent School District
- Brazos Independent School District (partial) (formerly Wallis-Orchard ISD)
- Brenham Independent School District (partial)
- Columbus Independent School District (partial)
- Sealy Independent School District
- Burton Independent School District (partial)

Blinn Junior College District is the designated community college for most of the county. Areas in Brazos ISD are in Wharton County Junior College District.

== Transportation ==
=== Major highways ===
- Interstate 10
- U.S. Highway 90
- State Highway 36
- State Highway 60
- State Highway 159
- Loop 350
- Loop 497

The TTC-69 component (recommended preferred) of the once-planned Trans-Texas Corridor went through Austin County.

== See also ==
- Adelsverein
- List of museums in the Texas Gulf Coast
- National Register of Historic Places listings in Austin County, Texas
- Recorded Texas Historic Landmarks in Austin County
