= Bellville, Texas =

- City
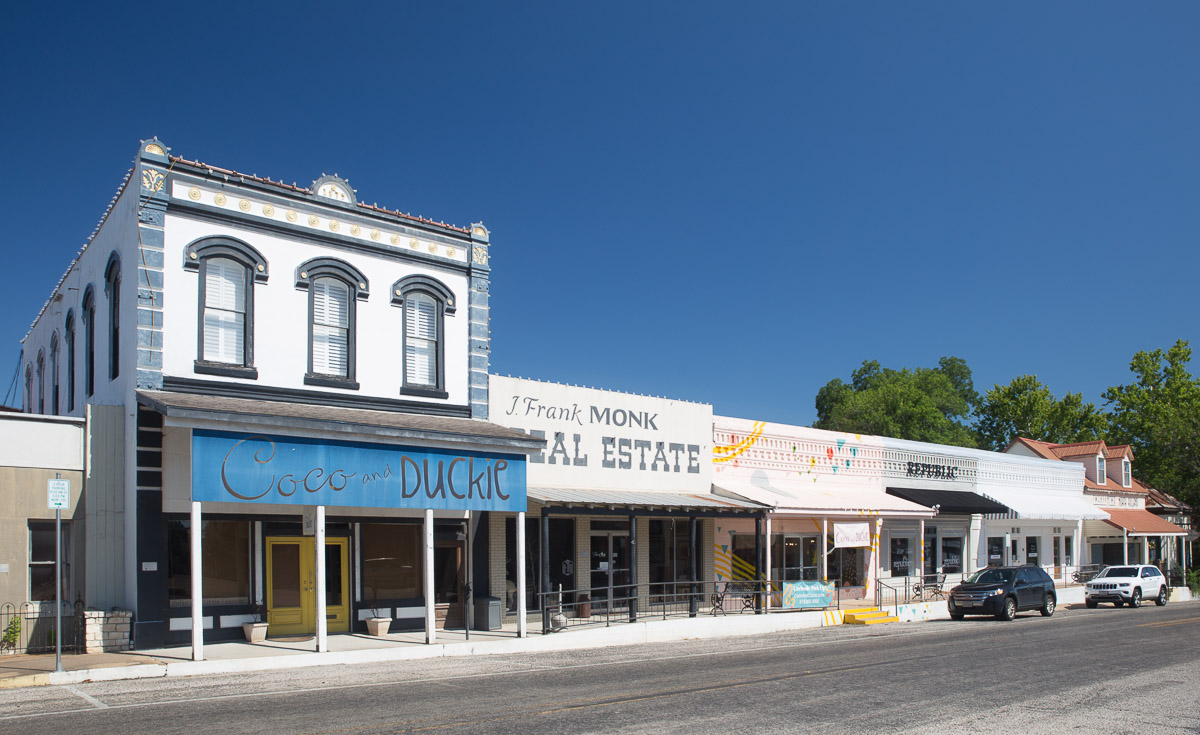
- Stores along Holland Street on the courthouse square
- Motto: "A Texas Experience"
- Interactive map of Bellville, Texas
- Coordinates: 29°56′50″N 96°15′31″W
- Country: United States
- State: Texas
- County: Austin

Area
  - Total: 2.68 sq mi (6.93 km^{2})
  - Land: 2.66 sq mi (6.88 km^{2})
  - Water: 0.019 sq mi (0.05 km^{2})
- Elevation: 292 ft (89 m)

Population (2020)
  - Total: 4,206
  - Density: 1,588.5/sq mi (613.32/km^{2})
- Time zone: UTC-6 (Central (CST))
  - Summer (DST): UTC-5 (CDT)
- ZIP code: 77418
- Area code: 979
- FIPS code: 48-07432
- GNIS feature ID: 1372492
- Website: www.cityofbellville.com

Bellville is a city in the U.S. state of Texas and the county seat of Austin County. The city's population was 4,206 at the 2020 census. Bellville is on the eastern edge of the Texas-German belt, and Bellville is known for its German culture and descendants of those Germans still call Bellville home.

State Highway 36 and State Highway 159 intersect at Bellville, as do FM 529, FM 1456, and FM 2429.

== History ==
Bellville was named for Thomas B. Bell, one of Stephen F. Austin's earliest colonists, after his brother and he donated land for the new county seat established by voters in 1846. San Felipe had been the county seat before the war for independence.

From 1860 to 1869, The Bellville Countryman served as Bellville's newspaper, and was published by John Patterson Osterhout.

== Geography ==
Bellville is located in Northern Austin County. According to the United States Census Bureau, Bellville has a total area of 2.7 square miles (6.9 km^{2}), all land.

=== Climate ===
The climate in this area is characterized by relatively high temperatures and evenly distributed precipitation throughout the year. The Köppen climate system describes the weather as humid subtropical, designated as Cfa on weather maps.

== Demographics ==
Historical population
| Census | Pop. | Note | %± |
|---|---|---|---|
| 1880 | 500 | | — |
| 1890 | 807 | | 61.4% |
| 1930 | 1,533 | | — |
| 1940 | 1,347 | | −12.1% |
| 1950 | 2,112 | | 56.8% |
| 1960 | 2,218 | | 5.0% |
| 1970 | 2,371 | | 6.9% |
| 1980 | 2,860 | | 20.6% |
| 1990 | 3,378 | | 18.1% |
| 2000 | 3,794 | | 12.3% |
| 2010 | 4,097 | | 8.0% |
| 2020 | 4,206 | | 2.7% |
U.S. Decennial Census

Bellville racial composition as of 2020 (NH = Non-Hispanic) (Note: Note: the US Census treats Hispanic/Latino as an ethnic category. This table excludes Latinos from the racial categories and assigns them to a separate category. Hispanics/Latinos can be of any race.)
| RaceC | Number | Percentage |
|---|---|---|
| White (NH) | 2,709 | 64.41% |
| Black or African American (NH) | 476 | 11.32% |
| Native American or Alaska Native (NH) | 17 | 0.4% |
| Asian (NH) | 44 | 1.05% |
| Some Other Race (NH) | 11 | 0.26% |
| Mixed/multiracial (NH) | 97 | 2.31% |
| Hispanic or Latino | 852 | 20.26% |
| Total | 4,206 | |

=== 2020 census ===
As of the 2020 census, Bellville had a population of 4,206, 1,729 households, and 923 families residing in the city. The median age was 40.7 years, 23.9% of residents were under the age of 18, and 21.1% of residents were 65 years of age or older. For every 100 females there were 89.3 males, and for every 100 females age 18 and over there were 82.9 males age 18 and over.

0% of residents lived in urban areas, while 100.0% lived in rural areas.

There were 1,729 households in Bellville, of which 32.0% had children under the age of 18 living in them. Of all households, 41.4% were married-couple households, 18.2% were households with a male householder and no spouse or partner present, and 35.2% were households with a female householder and no spouse or partner present. About 33.4% of all households were made up of individuals and 16.0% had someone living alone who was 65 years of age or older.

There were 1,926 housing units, of which 10.2% were vacant. Among occupied housing units, 58.6% were owner-occupied and 41.4% were renter-occupied. The homeowner vacancy rate was 2.4% and the rental vacancy rate was 8.8%.

Racial composition as of the 2020 census
| Race | Percent |
|---|---|
| White | 68.9% |
| Black or African American | 11.6% |
| American Indian and Alaska Native | 0.7% |
| Asian | 1.0% |
| Native Hawaiian and Other Pacific Islander | 0% |
| Some other race | 7.2% |
| Two or more races | 10.4% |
| Hispanic or Latino (of any race) | 20.3% |

=== 2000 census ===
As of the census of 2000, 3,794 people, 1,425 households, and 966 families lived in the city. The population density was 1,452.0 inhabitants per square mile (560.6/km^{2}). There were 1,566 housing units with an average density of 599.3 per square mile (231.4/km^{2}). The racial makeup of the city was 81.89% White, 11.68% African American, 0.40% Native American, 0.34% Asian, 3.95% from other races, and 1.74% from two or more races. Hispanics or Latinos of any race were 11.97% of the population.

Of the 1,425 households, 34.7% had children under 18 living with them, 52.6% were married couples living together, 11.6% had a female householder with no husband present, and 32.2% were not families. About 27.9% of all households were made up of individuals, and 15.3% had someone living alone who was 65 or older. The average household size was 2.52 and the average family size was 3.11.

In the city, the age distribution was 26.4% under 18, 8.3% from 18 to 24, 25.3% from 25 to 44, 20.2% from 45 to 64, and 19.7% who were 65 or older. The median age was 38 years. For every 100 females, there were 90.9 males. For every 100 females 18 and over, there were 85.1 males.

The median income for a household in the city was $40,806, and for a family was $49,730. Males had a median income of $36,719 versus $21,685 for females. The per capita income for the city was $17,671. About 4.5% of families and 8.0% of the population were below the poverty line, including 7.9% of those under age 18 and 8.1% of those age 65 or over.

== Education ==
Bellville Independent School District serves Bellville.

=== Schools ===
==== Public ====
- Bellville High School (grades 9–12)
- Bellville Junior High School (grades 6–8)
- O'Bryant Intermediate School (grades 4 and 5)
- O'Bryant Primary School (prekindergarten to grade 3)
- West End Elementary School (kindergarten to grade 5)

==== Private ====
- Faith Academy of Bellville (prekindergarten to grade 12)

== Notable people ==
- Beau Bell, Major League Baseball (MLB) player
- Juke Boy Bonner, blues musician
- William Crump, first speaker of the Texas House of Representatives following statehood
- Johnny Holland, NFL linebacker and coach
- Ernie A. Koy, MLB player
- Ernie M. Koy, NFL player
- Ted Koy, NFL player
- Lucas Luetge, MLB pitcher
- Leo Meyer, elected as mayor of Bellville in 1895, later moved to Oklahoma, where he became the first Jewish-Oklahoman elected to statewide public office.
- Emmanuel Sanders, NFL wide receiver
- Doug Supernaw, country music artist
- Hunter Goodwin, NFL player
