= Bellville Independent School District =

School district in Texas, United States

Address
- 518 South Mathews ESC Region 6 Bellville, Texas; United States
- Coordinates: 29°57′01″N 96°15′26″W

District information
- Type: Public Independent school district
- Grades: EE through 12
- Superintendent: Dr. Nicole Poenitzsch
- Schools: 6
- NCES District ID: 4809810

Students and staff
- Students: 2,283 (2023–2024)
- Teachers: 171.38 (on an FTE basis) (2023–2024)
- Staff: 176.51 (on an FTE basis) (2023–2024)
- Student–teacher ratio: 13.32 (2023–2024)
- Athletic conference: UIL Class 4A Football & Basketball
- District mascot: Brahmas
- Colors: Red, White

Other information
- TEA District Accountability Rating for 2011: Academically Acceptable
- Website: www.bellvilleisd.org

Bellville Independent School District is a public school district based in Bellville, Texas (USA). In addition to Bellville, the district also serves the city of Industry as well as rural areas in northern Austin County.

== Finances ==
As of the 2010-2011 school year, the appraised valuation of property in the district was $968,000,000. The maintenance tax rate was $0.104 and the bond tax rate was $0.022 per $100 of appraised valuation.

== Academic achievement ==
In 2011, the school district was rated "academically acceptable" by the Texas Education Agency.

== Schools ==
In the 2012-2013 school year, the district had students in six schools.

High schools

- Bellville High School (Bellville; Grades 9-12)

Middle schools

- Bellville Junior High (Bellville; Grades 6-8)

Elementary schools

- O'Bryant Intermediate (Bellville; Grades 4-5)
- O'Bryant Primary (Bellville; Grades EE-3)
- West End Elementary (Industry; Grades K-5)

Alternative schools

- Spicer Alternative Education Center (Grades 5-12)

== See also ==
- List of school districts in Texas
