= Sealy =

Sealy may refer to:

== Places ==
- Mount Sealy, New Zealand
- Sealy Tarns, New Zealand
- Sealy Township, Logan County, North Dakota
- Sealy, Texas
  - Sealy High School
  - Sealy Independent School District

== Other uses ==
- Sealy (surname), a surname (including a list of people with the name)
- Sealy Corporation, a manufacturer of mattresses

== See also ==
- John Sealy Hospital, a hospital in Galveston, Texas
- Seely
- Sealey
- Seeley (disambiguation)
- Sealy Hill, Canadian thoroughbred racehorse
