= Frydek, Texas =

Frydek
- Unincorporated community
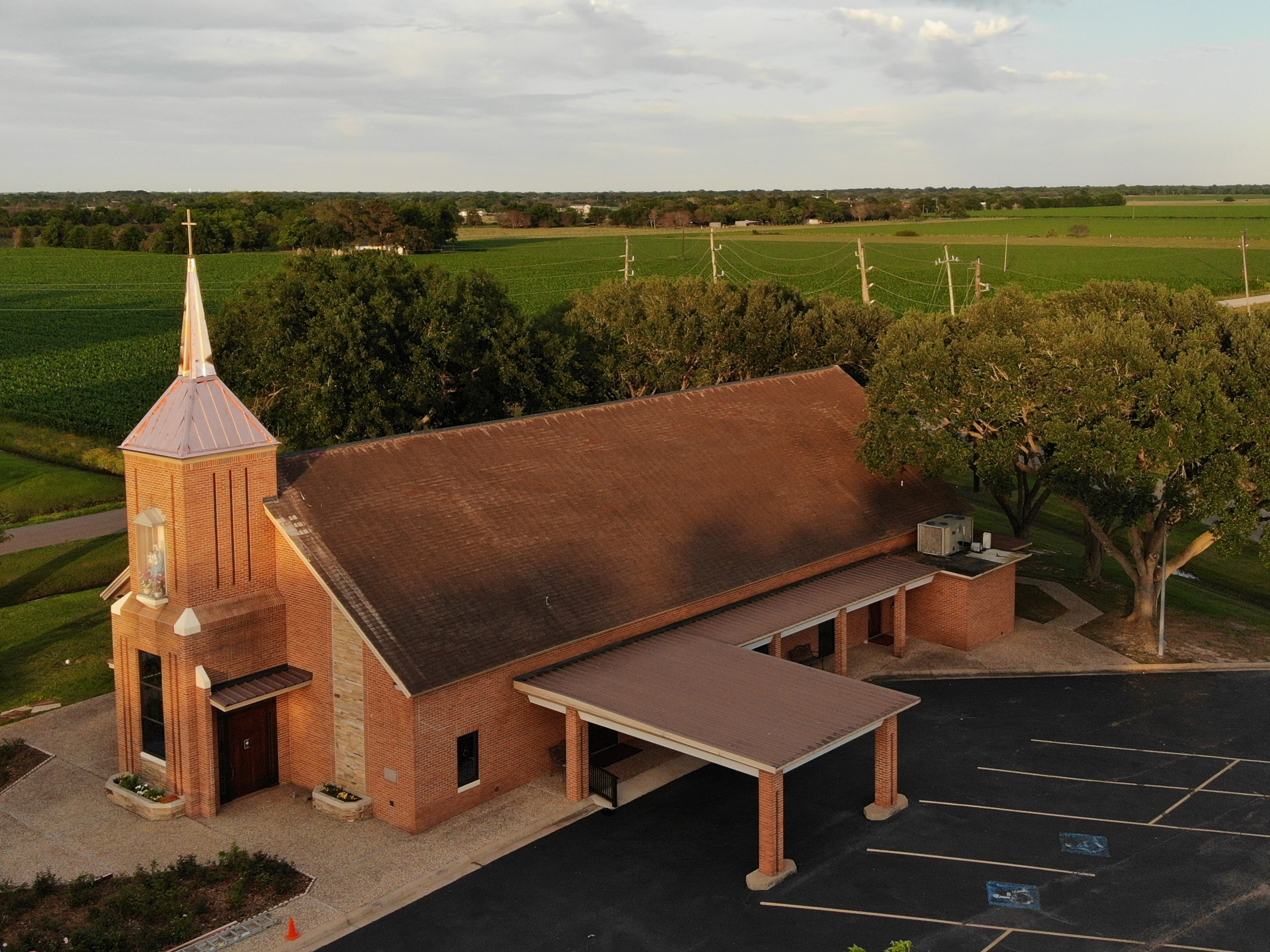
- A church in Frydek

- Location within the state of Texas Frydek (the United States)
- Coordinates: 29°45′12″N 96°5′18″W
- Country: United States
- State: Texas
- County: Austin
- Elevation: 151 ft (46 m)
- Time zone: UTC-6 (Central (CST))
  - Summer (DST): UTC-5 (CDT)
- ZIP codes: 77474
- GNIS: 1336285

Frydek (/ˈfridɛk/ FRY-dək) is an unincorporated community in southeastern Austin County, Texas, United States. According to the Handbook of Texas, the community had a population of 150 from 1964 through 2000. It is located within the Greater Houston metropolitan area.

== Geography ==
Frydek is situated on the west bank of the Brazos River on FM 1458, approximately 3 miles (4.8 km) south of San Felipe and 3 miles (4.8 km) east of Sealy. It is also located 18 mi (29 km) southeast of the county seat of Bellville.

== History ==
The area was first settled when some members of the Old Three Hundred received land grants in the 1820s. Czechs set up the community of Frydek in 1895 on a league of land that was originally granted to Stephen F. Austin in 1831. The settlement was probably named after the town of Frýdek in what is now the Czech Republic. It soon became a market for farmers and ranchers and had a post office in 1901–1906. Frydek had four commercial establishments in 1931 as well as a church that remained in operation in 1999. The population was 25 in 1933, 75 in 1939, and 150 in 1964 through 2000. The population of the community remains predominantly Czech.

In 2019, part of this community was incorporated as the city of South Frydek, after the area around the church became part of the city of Sealy's Extra Territorial Jurisdiction (ETJ).

== Education ==
The local school had 36 students in 1918. Today, the community is served by the Sealy Independent School District.

== Gallery ==
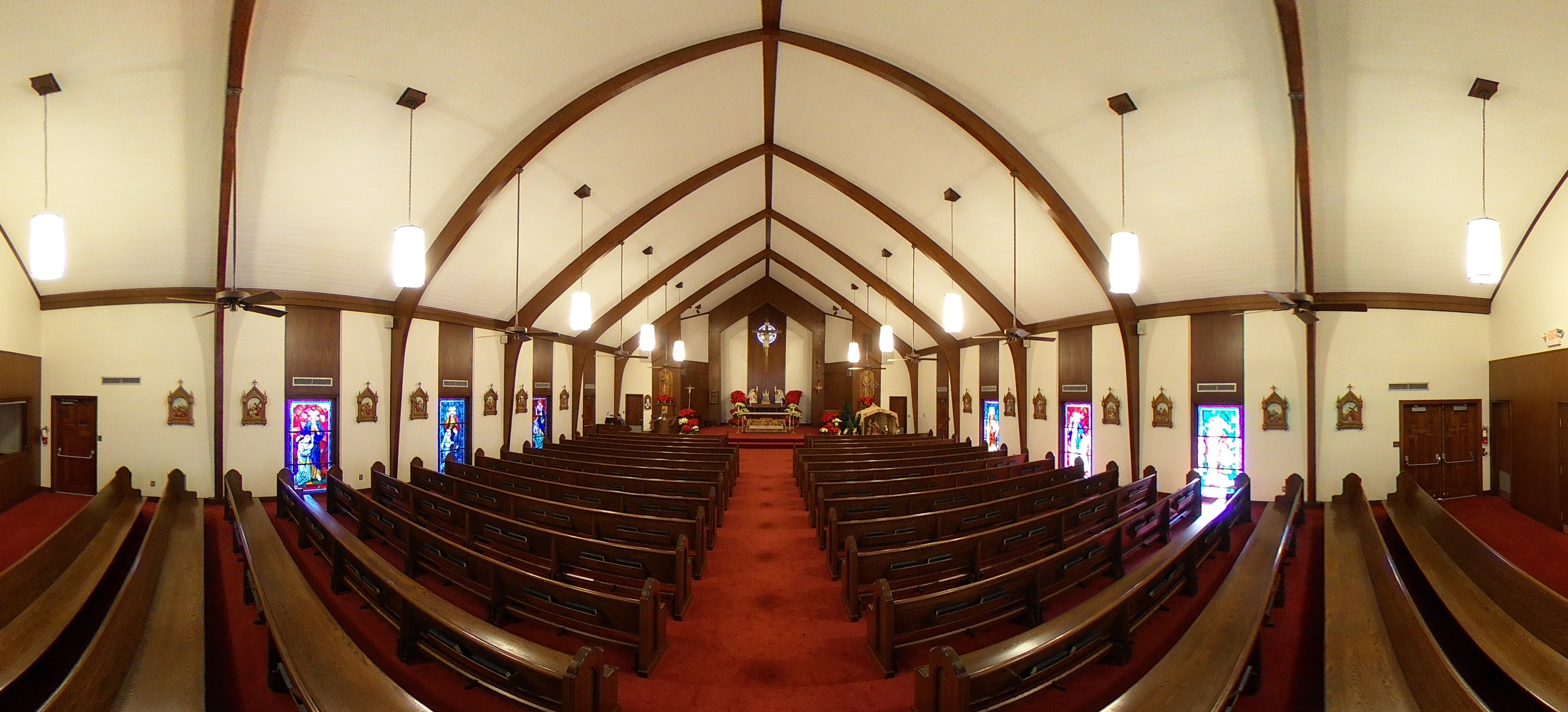
St. Mary's Catholic Church in Frydek

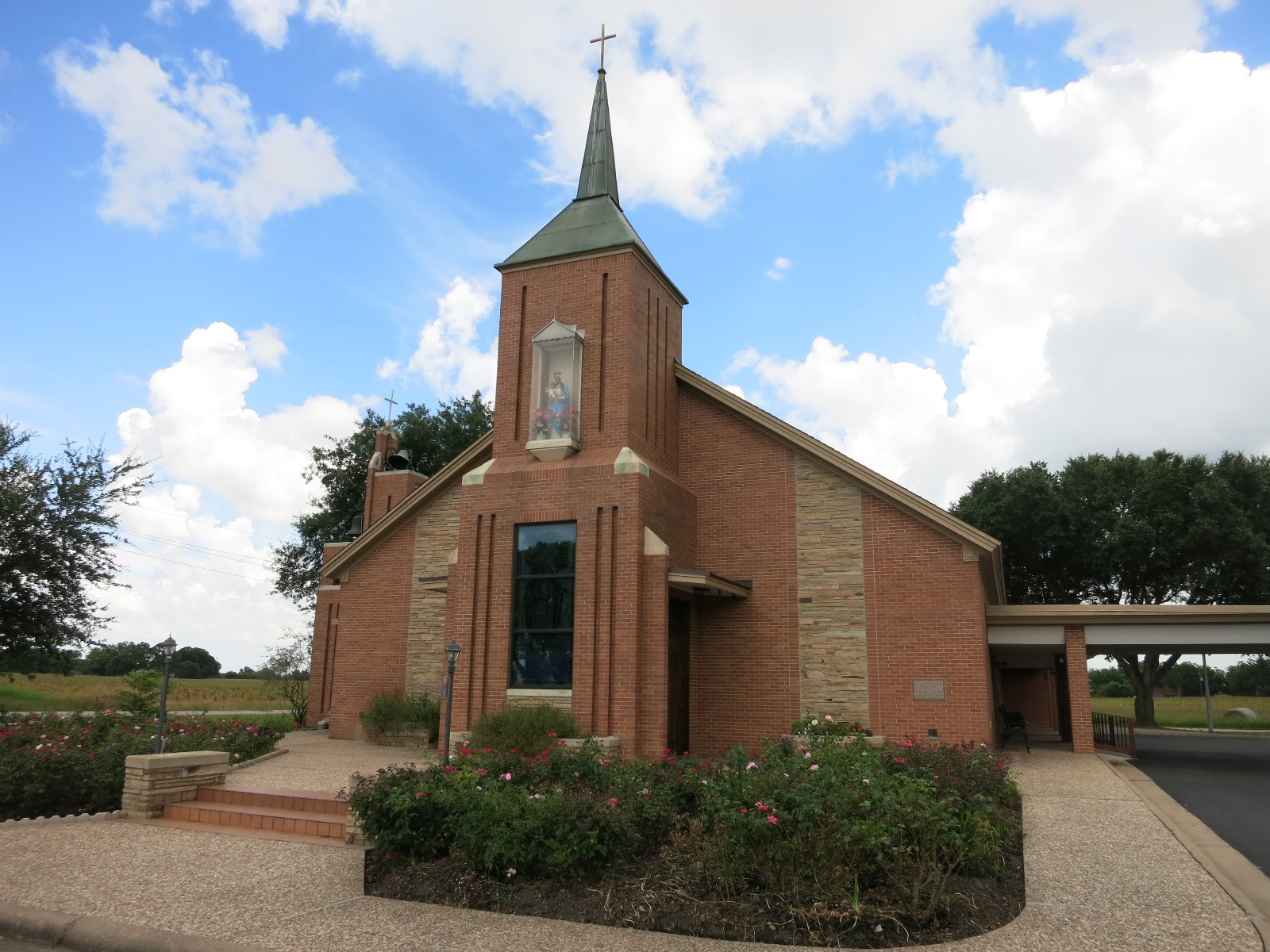
St. Mary's Catholic Church in Frydek

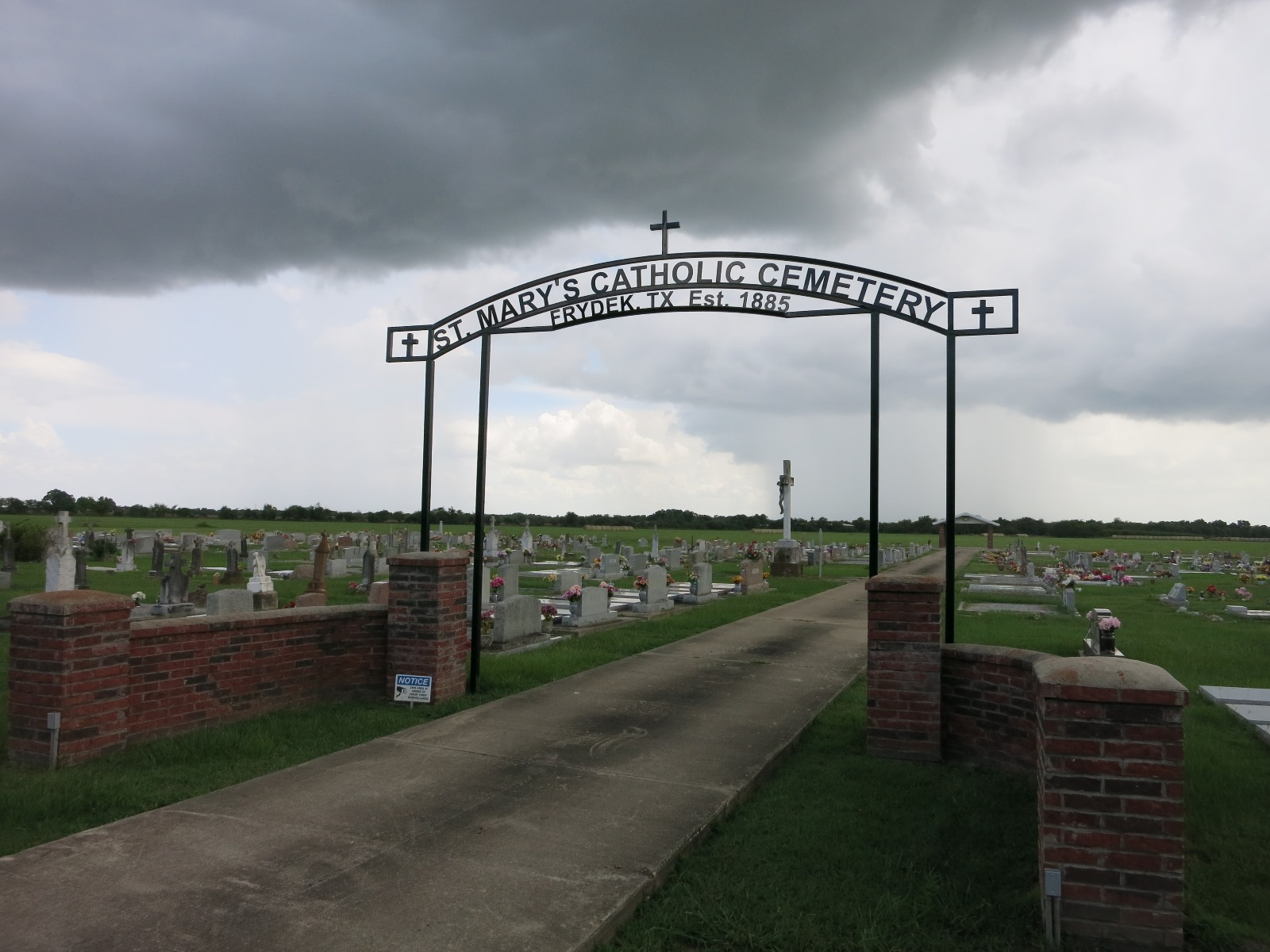
St. Mary's Catholic Church Cemetery on FM 1458

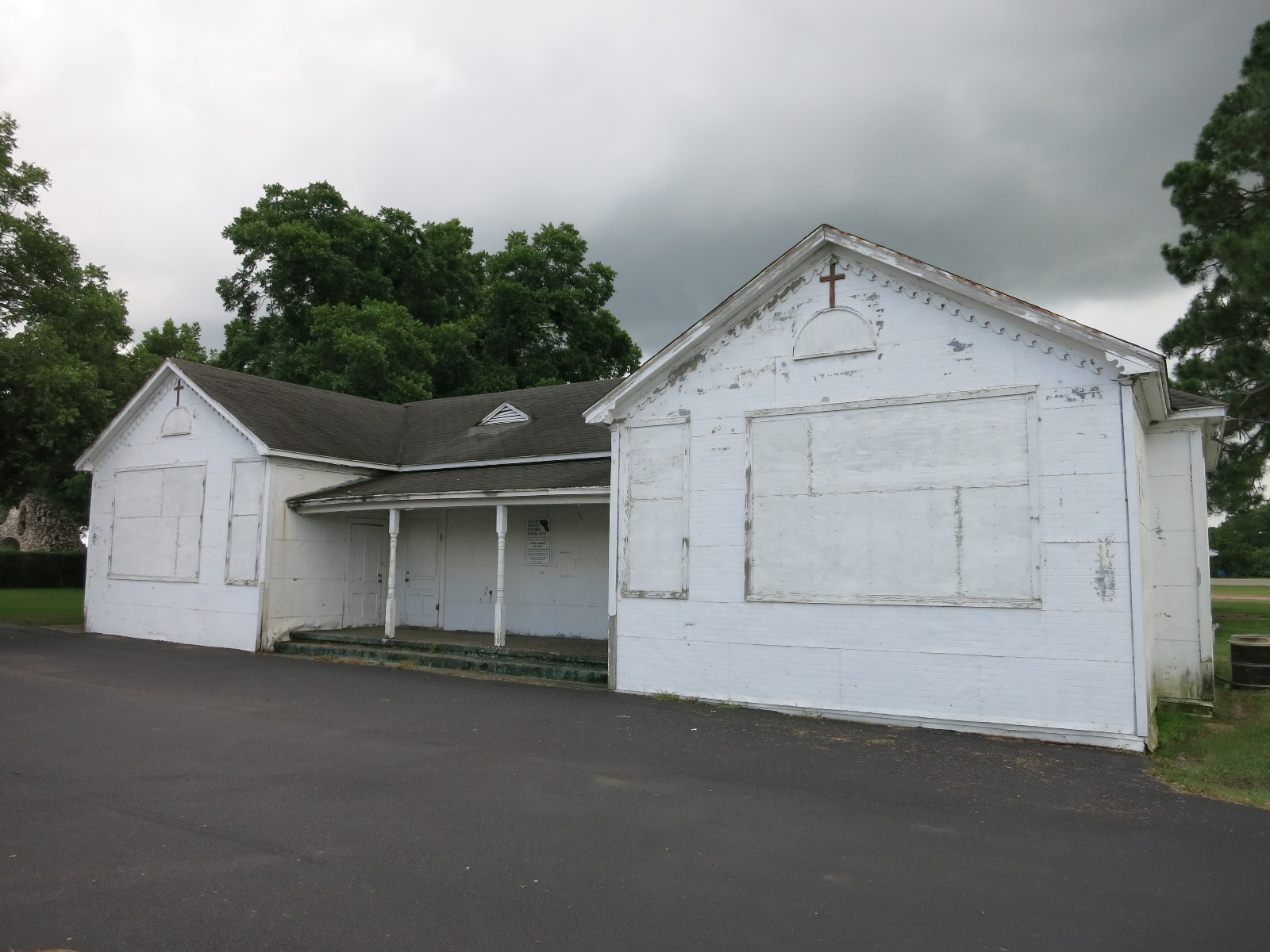
St. Mary's Parochial School (1916–1964)
