= Pat Oliphant =

Australian-American political cartoonist (1935–2026)

- Born: Patrick Bruce Oliphant; 24 July 1935; Maylands, South Australia, Australia
- Died: 13 July 2026 (aged 90); Santa Fe, New Mexico, U.S.
- Known for: Caricature, painting, sculpture
- Awards: Pulitzer Prize

Patrick Bruce Oliphant (24 July 1935 – 13 July 2026) was an Australian-born American political cartoonist whose career spanned more than 60 years. His body of work primarily focused on American and global politics, culture, and corruption; he is particularly known for his caricatures of American presidents and other powerful leaders. Over the course of his long career, Oliphant produced thousands of daily editorial cartoons, dozens of bronze sculptures, and a large oeuvre of drawings and paintings. He retired in 2015.

== Early life and education ==
Oliphant was born on 24 July 1935, in Maylands, a suburb of Adelaide, Australia, to Donald Knox Oliphant and Grace Lillian Oliphant (née Price) of Rosslyn Park. Patrick grew up in a three-room cabin in Aldgate, in the Adelaide Hills, with no electricity or running water in a desert of snakes and scorpions. He attended a one-room schoolhouse and hated formal education. His father worked as a draftsman for Australia's Ministry of Lands, and Oliphant credited him with sparking his interest in drawing. His early education took place in a one-room schoolhouse, followed by Unley High School.

== Career ==
In 1952, while still a teenager, Oliphant began his career in journalism as a copy boy at Adelaide's evening tabloid newspaper, The News, which had recently been inherited by Rupert Murdoch. He had no interest in attending college, as he had an ambivalent relationship with formal education and already knew he wanted to be a journalist. In 1955, he moved to The News' rival, The Advertiser, a morning broadsheet with 200,000 subscribers.

Before long, editors noticed his interest in drawing, and he began producing both cartoons and illustrations. However, the paper's conservative editorial policies frustrated him, and after frequent vetoes of his commentaries on Australian politics, he learned that cartoons on international affairs were less likely to be censored. During this period, he found inspiration in the work of English cartoonist Ronald Searle, Western Australian cartoonist Paul Rigby, and the political commentary in Mad magazine, which he described as a "shot in the arm."

=== The Denver Post ===
In 1959, Oliphant travelled to the United States and Great Britain to learn about cartooning in those countries. He decided he wanted to move to the United States, but he had to wait five years until his contract with The Advertiser expired. In 1964, while preparing to move without a job, he learned that cartoonist Paul Conrad was leaving the Denver Post. Oliphant sent a portfolio of work to the Post and was hired over 50 American applicants. He moved to the United States with his wife, Hendrika DeVries, and their two children. The Post featured a small snippet of Oliphant's cartoon on the front page as a "teaser" for what would be found on the editorial page.

Announcing his arrival, Time magazine stated, "Few U.S. cartoonists have so deftly distilled the spirit of [Lyndon B. Johnson and Barry Goldwater] as Australia's Patrick Bruce Oliphant, 29, a recent arrival who has not yet set eyes on either Johnson or Goldwater." Less than a year after Oliphant began working at the Denver Post, in April 1965, his work was syndicated internationally by the Los Angeles Times Syndicate. Oliphant's reputation grew rapidly, and in 1967, he was awarded the Pulitzer Prize for Editorial Cartooning for his 1 February 1966 cartoon They Won't Get Us To The Conference Table... Will They? In this cartoon, Ho Chi Minh is depicted carrying the body of a dead Vietnamese man in the posture of a Pietà. Oliphant had intentionally submitted what he considered one of the weakest cartoons he had published that year. When it won, he criticized the Pulitzer board, stating that they had selected the cartoon for its subject matter rather than the quality of the work. He refused to be considered for the award again and became a regular critic of the Pulitzer.

According to Ralph Steadman, Oliphant would have been Hunter S. Thompson's "first choice of a 'cartoonist collaborator'".

=== The Washington Star ===
In 1975, Oliphant moved to The Washington Star, attracted by editor Jim Bellows. In 1980, he switched syndication companies, joining Universal Press Syndicate. The Star ceased publication in 1981.

=== Independent work ===
After The Washington Star folded, Oliphant received offers from other newspapers but chose to remain independent, relying on the earnings from his extensive syndication. He was the first political cartoonist in the twentieth century to work independently from a home newspaper, which provided him with unique independence from editorial control. By this time, he had become a nationally recognized figure. In 1976, a survey of 188 cartoonists found that fellow professionals regarded Oliphant as the "best all-around cartoonist" on the editorial pages. A decade later, a similar survey reached the same conclusion, noting Oliphant's original and influential aesthetic. By 1983, Oliphant was the most widely syndicated American political cartoonist, with his work appearing in more than 500 newspapers. His work influenced the field's overall appearance. For example, when he stopped using Duoshade, a chemical process for creating textured backgrounds, in the early 1980s, other cartoonists followed suit. In 1990, The New York Times described him as "the most influential editorial cartoonist now working".

By 1995, Oliphant had reduced the frequency of his daily cartoons to four days a week. At this time, he began submitting his cartoons in digital form as scans of his original drawings. By 2014, he was submitting three cartoons a week.

In 1997, Oliphant began to transfer his home and studio from Washington, D.C., to Santa Fe, New Mexico, completing the move in 2004.

In 2012, Oliphant was the Roy Lichtenstein Artist in Residence at the American Academy in Rome for three months.

In January 2015, Oliphant retired from publishing syndicated cartoons. However, in February 2017, he came out of retirement with two cartoons for The Nib featuring Donald Trump and Steve Bannon. One cartoon depicted Trump as a childlike member of the Hitler Youth, asking a ghoulish Bannon what he thought of his outfit.

== Personal life and death ==
Oliphant was the nephew of Sir Mark Oliphant, the Australian physicist who worked on the Manhattan Project during World War II and later became the Governor of South Australia.

In 1979, Oliphant was naturalized as an American citizen. In 1983, he married his second wife, Mary Ann Kuhn, but they divorced in 1994. He married Susan C. Conway in 1996, and they remained married for the rest of his life. He had three children, Grant, Laura, and Susanne Oliphant, and two stepchildren, Pauline and Daniel Conway.

He enjoyed flying and held a commercial pilot's certificate. Oliphant was a longtime member of the Bad Golfers Association. He was left-handed and a vegetarian.

Oliphant died at his home in Santa Fe, on 13 July 2026, at the age of 90 of age-related health issues. His memorial service was held at Westminster Presbyterian Church in Charlottesville, Virginia on July 18, 2026.

== Style ==
Oliphant's earliest cartoons in Australia often mimicked the style of his elders, but his mature style is easily identifiable and distinctive. His caricatured subjects are immediately recognizable and are made "grotesque" through "extreme distortion". He is recognized for his skilled drafting, and for his innovative use of the horizontal format in editorial cartoons. As Rick Marschall noted in 1999, "Oliphant offered a style totally his own and revolutionary in the field. The Oliphant look—long-faced characters, sparse use of icons and labels, arresting 'camera angles'—still dominates the field, at least in the minds of cartoonists who aspire to Oliphant's unflagging brilliance." Curator Harry Katz has called him "one of history's finest comic artists".

Oliphant specialized in caricaturing United States presidents, and multiple exhibitions have featured his work organized chronologically or respectively by presidential administration. He developed specific tropes for various presidents: His dark, brooding Richard Nixon is sometimes depicted naked and ashamed, covering his privates like Adam and Eve, and at other times making the "Victory" sign. Oliphant regularly portrayed the accident-prone Gerald Ford with a bandage on his forehead. His fondness for Ronald Reagan did not prevent him from portraying the president as an oblivious buffoon in a parody of one of his films. George H. W. Bush sometimes appears clutching a handbag and at other times is swathed in cloth as "Bush of Arabia". During the Bill Clinton administration, Oliphant regularly used Socks the cat and Buddy the dog as a sort of "Greek chorus" to comment on the events. He famously portrayed Barack Obama as an Easter Island head worshipped by voters. Oliphant found that it took time to find the right look for a new president, noting, "I hate changes of Administrations. It takes six months to 'get' a new man."

=== "Punk" ===
Early in his career, Oliphant began to include a small penguin in almost every one of his political cartoons. This character, which he named Punk, joined a tradition of such secondary figures, termed "dingbats" by cartoonist R. C. Harvey. These figures appear in the work of earlier cartoonists such as Fred O. Seibel of the Richmond Times-Dispatch, whose cartoons featured a small, ironic crow, and earlier by W.K. (William Keevil) Patrick of the New Orleans Times-Democrat and later Times-Picayune, who had a signature duck character. Punk was inspired by a penguin brought back by a colleague from South Australia's south coast, who delivered the penguin to the zoo. Oliphant decided to include a penguin in his cartoon as a result. Initially, Punk was depicted as an easily identifiable Adelie penguin, but he soon became stylized and remained so throughout Oliphant's career. Punk adds a layer of commentary to the subject of the cartoon, and is often placed in conversation with another tiny figure. Punk proved popular with both adults and children, who enjoyed the game of finding him in each cartoon. In 1984, Oliphant briefly drew a full-colour comic strip featuring Punk for the Sunday funnies, titled Sunday Punk, but found the work too laborious and soon discontinued the strip.

Oliphant originally created Punk as a space for subversion in the conservative editorial environment of the Adelaide Advertiser. Punk provided a platform for Oliphant's own opinions, while the overall cartoon needed to align with the views of the paper's editors. Punk's perspective varies from cartoon to cartoon: sometimes bemused, sometimes ironic, and sometimes trenchant, and does not always represent Oliphant's personal viewpoint.

== Courting controversy ==
Oliphant's cartoons are rarely warm towards their subjects. He often stated that his job is to criticize, and he deliberately avoided getting to know his subjects for fear of liking them. He intentionally courted backlash, saying in Rolling Stone in 1976, "This really isn't a business ... it's a cause. I'm an outcast because of it. A writer can’t really say, 'This man's an idiot,' because the law holds him back. We can say it."

Oliphant often remarked on his intention to draw criticism from all political perspectives and indeed received strong criticism from ethnic and religious groups for some of his cartoons. In 2001, the Asian American Journalists Association accused Oliphant of "cross[ing] the line from acerbic depiction to racial caricature".

In 2005, the American-Arab Anti-Discrimination Committee expressed concern that some of Oliphant's caricatures were racist and misleading. In 2007, two Oliphant cartoons produced similar responses. One cartoon about Israel's December 2008 offensive against Hamas in Gaza sparked criticism among some American Jews. The cartoon featured a jackbooted, headless figure representing Israel in a goosestepping posture, looming over a small female figure holding a baby labelled "Gaza". The Los Angeles-based Simon Wiesenthal Center said the cartoon denigrated and demonized Israel and mimicked Nazi propaganda. It called on the New York Times and other media outlets to remove the cartoon from their websites.

A 2005 cartoon showing Condoleezza Rice as a parrot perched on George W. Bush's shoulder was criticized by some readers for depicting her with buck teeth and exaggerated lips.

Oliphant's cartoons featuring Catholic scandals have also been controversial. The Catholic League called him "one of the most viciously anti-Catholic editorial cartoonists ever to have disgraced the pages of American newspapers". On Christmas Eve 1993, Catholic readers were angered by a cartoon associating Michael Jackson and priests with child molestation. One of his most famous cartoons, "Celebration of Spring at St. Pedophilia's – the Annual Running of the Altar Boys", sparked nationwide debates in print, radio, and television when it was published on 20 March 2002. The New York Times and Washington Post, as well as other papers, chose not to include the cartoon online, while some did not run it at all.

In 1987, Oliphant protested the selection of Berkeley Breathed for the Pulitzer Prize for Editorial Cartooning. Oliphant's concern was that Breathed's work "has, so far as I know, not appeared on one editorial page in the country". Addressing the Association of American Editorial Cartoonists convention to hearty applause, Oliphant represented the views of many of his colleagues: that the seriousness of editorial cartooning as a journalistic pursuit was at risk and that the Pulitzer was encouraging the valuing of humour over political statement.

== Non-newspaper drawings ==
Newspaper editorial cartoons were not Oliphant's only genre. In his early days in Australia, he produced a wide variety of newspaper illustrations. Later in his career, he created illustrations for numerous books, and his work, often in full colour, was featured in the pages and on the covers of many magazines. For a time, he drew cartoons for Rolling Stone; this body of work was intended for a different audience than his newspaper cartoons and was often more graphic or intentionally offensive than his syndicated work. In the 1990s, he drew for a Northwest Airlines advertising campaign advocating the "open skies" policy concept. (Oliphant sometimes flew privately and held a pilot's certificate.) By the early 1980s, Oliphant had begun producing sculpture in addition to his editorial cartoons. In 1988, he started attending William Christenberry's figure drawing classes at the Corcoran School of Art. His work in various media has been featured in several exhibitions, most notably at the National Portrait Gallery. He worked in pen and ink, oil, lithography, and other media.

== Sculpture ==
Oliphant began working in bronze in the early 1980s and produced a significant body of work throughout the remainder of his career. His bronze caricatures have been favorably compared with those of the nineteenth-century French caricaturist Honoré Daumier. Oliphant's bronzes often depict heads, busts, or full-figure portraits of major political figures, although he also sculpted animals, various human types, and compositions featuring multiple figures. His sculptures vary in scale, from a diminutive Jimmy Carter to a larger-than-life depiction of Angelina Eberly, an important figure in the Texas Archive War, which is located on the sidewalk along Congress Avenue in Austin, Texas, near the Capitol.

=== Works in bronze ===
- Tip O’Neill, 1985. Held by Albert and Shirley Small Special Collections Library
- Military Dance/Dancing Couple, 1986
- Klansman, 1987; edition of 3. Held by Albert and Shirley Small Special Collections Library
- Harry Byrd, edition of 10. Held by Albert and Shirley Small Special Collections Library
- Artist and Model [Oliphant and Nixon]; unique. Held by Albert and Shirley Small Special Collections Library
- Nixon on Horseback, 1985; edition of 12. Held by National Portrait Gallery; Albert and Shirley Small Special Collections Library
- Nixon [victory sign]; edition of 10. Held by Albert and Shirley Small Special Collections Library
- Naked Nixon, 1985; edition of 12. Held by Phillips Collection; Albert and Shirley Small Special Collections Library
- Richard Nixon, 1985; held by National Portrait Gallery
- Lyndon Johnson, 1985; edition of 12. Held by National Portrait Gallery; Albert and Shirley Small Special Collections Library
- Reagan on Horseback, 1985; edition of 12. Held by National Portrait Gallery; Albert and Shirley Small Special Collections Library
- Gerald Ford, 1989. Held by National Portrait Gallery; Albert and Shirley Small Special Collections Library
- Jimmy Carter, 1989; edition of 10. Held by National Portrait Gallery; Albert and Shirley Small Special Collections Library
- Clinton as Billy the Kid. Held by Albert and Shirley Small Special Collections Library
- George Bush [throwing horseshoes], 1989. Held by National Portrait Gallery; Albert and Shirley Small Special Collections Library
- Jesse Helms, 1991; edition of 12. Held by Albert and Shirley Small Special Collections Library
- General Schwartzkopf, 1991; edition of 12. Held by Albert and Shirley Small Special Collections Library
- Clark Clifford, 1991; edition of 10. Held by Albert and Shirley Small Special Collections Library
- Daniel Patrick Moynihan, 1991; edition of 10. Held by National Portrait Gallery; Albert and Shirley Small Special Collections Library
- Rhino, 1992; edition of 9
- Bush of Arabia, 1993; edition of 20. Held by Albert and Shirley Small Special Collections Library
- Cigar Dreams (Bill Clinton), 1999; edition of 9
- The Adjournment of the Luncheon Party, 2002
- Leadership [Bush and Cheney]
- Angelina Eberly, 2004
- Mrs. Levine, 2006; edition of 5. Held by Albert and Shirley Small Special Collections Library
- Rumsfeld, 2006; edition of 9
- Alan Greenspan, 2008; edition of 5. Held by Albert and Shirley Small Special Collections Library
- Obama: An Easter Island Figure, 2009; edition of 10

== Publications ==
=== Exhibitions and catalogues ===
- Cartoons by Pat Oliphant, Dimock Gallery, The George Washington University, October 1–29, 1970. (Checklist only.)
- Washington '76 Show, Chicago: Jack O'Grady Galleries, 1976.
- Mauldin / Oliphant: Origins, Washington, DC: Jane Haslem Gallery, 1982. Exhibition with Bill Mauldin.
- Oliphant's Presidents: Twenty-five Years of Caricature by Pat Oliphant, Kansas City: Andrews and McMeel, 1990.
- Politische Karikaturen in USA und in Deutschland, Landau: Thomas-Nast-Vereins, 1992. Exhibition with Gerhard Mester.
- A Window on the 1992 Campaign, New York: Princeton Club of New York, 1992. Pamphlet. Exhibition with David Levine, Edward Sorel, and Paul Conrad.
- Oliphant: The New World Order in Drawing and Sculpture 1983–1993, Kansas City: Andrews and McMeel, 1994.
- Seven Presidents: The Art of Oliphant: March 4, 1995 – June 4, 1995, San Diego Museum of Art, 1995.
- Oliphant in Washington, Rigby in New York: Two Australians Loose in America: June 22–August 10, 1995, [Washington, DC?, 1995?]. Exhibition with Paul Rigby.
- Oliphant's Anthem: Pat Oliphant at the Library of Congress, Kansas City: Andrews McMeel, 1998.
- Oliphant in Santa Fe, Santa Fe: Museum of Fine Arts, 2000.
- Leadership: Oliphant Cartoons and Sculpture from the Bush Years, Kansas City: Andrews McMeel, 2007.
- Patrick Oliphant: A Survey: Selections from Rome and Other Works, Santa Fe: Gerald Peters Gallery, 2013.
- Oliphant: Unpacking the Archive, Charlottesville, VA: University of Virginia Library and UVA Press, 2019.

=== Print suites ===
- The Nixon Series: Four New Lithographs by Pat Oliphant, New York: Solo Press, 1985.
- Century's End (Aquatints), Santa Fe: Landfall Press, undated.

=== Cartoon collections ===
- The Oliphant Book: A Cartoon History of Our Times, New York: Simon & Schuster, 1969.
- Four More Years, New York: Simon & Schuster, 1973.
- Oliphant: An Informal Gathering, New York: Simon & Schuster, 1978.
- Oliphant!: A Cartoon Collection, Kansas City: Andrews and McMeel, 1980.
- The Jellybean Society: A Cartoon Collection, Kansas City: Andrews and McMeel, 1981.
- Ban This Book!: A Cartoon Collection, Kansas City: Andrews and McMeel, 1982.
- But Seriously, Folks!: More Cartoons, Kansas City: Andrews and McMeel, 1983.
- The Year of Living Perilously: More Cartoons, Kansas City: Andrews, McMeel and Parker, 1984.
- Make My Day!: More Cartoons, Kansas City: Andrews and McMeel, 1985.
- Between Rock and a Hard Place, Kansas City: Andrews, McMeel and Parker, 1986.
- Up to There in Alligators: More Cartoons, Kansas City: Andrews, McMeel and Parker, 1987.
- Nothing Basically Wrong: More Cartoons, Kansas City: Andrews and McMeel, 1988.
- What Those People Need Is a Puppy!: More Cartoons, Kansas City: Andrews and McMeel, 1989.
- Fashions for the New World Order: More Cartoons, Kansas City: Andrews and McMeel, 1991.
- Just Say No!: More Cartoons, Kansas City: Andrews, McMeel and Parker, 1992.
- Why Do I Feel Uneasy?: More Cartoons, Kansas City: Andrews and McMeel, 1993.
- Waiting for the Other Shoe to Drop... More Cartoons, Kansas City: Andrews and McMeel, 1994.
- Off to the Revolution: More Cartoons, Kansas City: Andrews and McMeel, 1995.
- Reaffirm the Status Quo!: More Cartoons, Kansas City: Andrews McMeel, 1996.
- 101 Things to Do With a Conservative, Kansas City: Andrews McMeel, 1996.
- So That's Where They Came From, Kansas City: Andrews McMeel, 1997.
- Are We There Yet?, Kansas City: Andrews McMeel, 1999.
- Now We're Going To Have To Spray For Politicians, Kansas City: Andrews McMeel, 2000.
- When We Can't See The Forest for the Bushes, Kansas City: Andrews McMeel, 2001.

=== Illustrated by Oliphant ===
- Max Fatchen, Facing Up with Fatchen, Adelaide: Griffin Press, 1959. Heavily illustrated by Pat Oliphant.
- John Osborne, The Third Year of the Nixon Watch, New York: Liveright, 1972. Illustrated by Pat Oliphant.
- Larry L. King, That Terrible Night Santa Got Lost in the Woods: A Story, Encino, Calif.: Encino Press, 1981. Illustrated by Pat Oliphant.
- Brian Kelly, Adventures in Porkland: How Washington Wastes Your Money and Why They Won't Stop, New York: Villard, 1992. Illustrated by Pat Oliphant.
- Bruce Nash and Allan Zullo with Bill Hartigan, Golf's Most Outrageous Quotes: An Official Bad Golfers Association Book, Kansas City: Andrews McMeel, 1995. Illustrated by Pat Oliphant.
- Karen Walker and Pat Oliphant, Understanding Santa Fe Real Estate, Santa Fe: Karen Walker Real Estate, 1997.
- William C. Carson, Peter Becomes a Trail Man: The Story of a Boy's Journey on the Santa Fe Trail, Albuquerque: University of New Mexico Press, 2002. Illustrations by Pat Oliphant.

=== Text contributed by Oliphant ===
- Aislin, Where's the Trough? and Other Aislin Cartoons, Toronto: McClelland and Stewart, 1985. Introduction by Pat Oliphant.
- Dan Wasserman, We've Been Framed!: Cartoons, Boston: Faber and Faber, 1987. Introduction by Pat Oliphant.
- Bill Watterson, Something Under the Bed Is Drooling, Kansas City: Andrews and McMeel, 1988. Foreword by Pat Oliphant.
- Jim Morin, Line of Fire: Political Cartoons, Miami: Florida International University Press, 1991. Foreword by Pat Oliphant.
- Bill Mitchell, Mitchell's View, Rochester, NY: Coconut Press, 1993. Foreword by Pat Oliphant.
- S. L. Harrison, Florida's Editorial Cartoonists: A Collection of Editorial Art, Sarasota: Pineapple Press, 1996. Foreword by Pat Oliphant.
- Kevin Kallaugher, KAL Draws a Crowd: Political Cartoons, Baltimore: Woodholme House, 1997. Foreword by Pat Oliphant.
- Asa E. Reid, Ace Reid and the Cowpokes Cartoons, Austin: University of Texas Press, 1999. Foreword by Pat Oliphant.
- Richard's Poor Almanack: Twelve Months of Misinformation in Handy Cartoon Form, Cincinnati: Emmis Books, 2004. Foreword by Pat Oliphant.

=== Book cover art ===
- Karl Kirchwey, Stumbling Blocks: Roman Poems, Evanston, IL: TriQuarterly Books, 2017.
- Maureen Dowd, Bushworld: Enter at Your Own Risk, New York: G.P. Putnam's Sons, 2004.
- P.J. O'Rourke, Thrown Under the Omnibus, New York: Atlantic Monthly Press, 2015.

=== Contributions to anthologies ===
- Josef Josten, The Great Challenge, London: Pemrow Publications, 1958.

=== Animated films ===
- A Snort History. Directed by Stan Phillips, animation by Pat Oliphant. 1971. Anti-drunk-driving video for the Colorado Department of Health, Denver Alcohol Safety Action Project.
- Choice Stakes. Directed by Stan Phillips. Animation concept and design by Pat Oliphant. 1974. Produced for the Environmental Protection Agency.

== Awards and honours ==
- Award-winner in the Grand Challenge Editorial Cartoonist Competition (London), 1958
- Sigma Delta Chi Distinguished Service Award, Society of Professional Journalists, 1966
- Pulitzer Prize for Editorial Cartooning, 1967
- Reuben Award for Outstanding Cartoonist of the Year, National Cartoonists Society, 1968, 1972
- Distinguished Service Award, National Wildlife Federation, 1969
- Reuben Award for Editorial Cartooning, National Cartoonists Society, 1971, 1973, 1974, 1984, 1989, 1990, 1991
- Larry Tajiri Media Award, American Civil Liberties Union of Colorado, 1973
- National Headliners Award for Editorial Cartooning
- National Cartoonists Society Editorial Cartoon Award, 1971, 1972, 1973, 1974, 1984, 1989, 1990, 1991
- Golden Plate Award of the American Academy of Achievement, 1974
- Honorary Doctor of Humane Letters, Dartmouth College, 1981
- Thomas Nast Prize, 1992
- Cartoonist of the Year, Washington Journalism Review (1985, and another year)
- Inkpot Award, 2009
- Honorary Officer of the Order of Australia, 30 November 2012, "For service to the arts, particularly as a cartoonist, and to strengthening Australia's relations with the United States of America"

== Archives and collections ==
Oliphant's papers are housed at the Albert and Shirley Small Special Collections Library at the University of Virginia. The collection includes nearly 7,000 daily cartoon drawings, numerous sketchbooks, fine art on paper, sculpture, fan and hate mail, and extensive documentation of Oliphant's career. His works are also held in the permanent collections of the Library of Congress, National Portrait Gallery, Gerald R. Ford Presidential Museum, George W. Bush Presidential Library, the University of Colorado Boulder Libraries, and the New Mexico Museum of Art in Santa Fe.

== See also ==
- A Savage Art: The Life & Cartoons of Pat Oliphant, a 2025 American documentary film.
