= South Frydek, Texas =

City in Texas

- City
- Location within Texas Location within the United States
- Coordinates: 29°43′55″N 96°4′26″W
- Country: United States
- State: Texas
- County: Austin
- Established: 2019

Area
  - Total: 1.77 sq mi (4.6 km^{2})
  - Land: 1.77 sq mi (4.6 km^{2})
  - Water: 0.00 sq mi (0 km^{2})

Population (2020)
  - Total: 207
- Time zone: UTC-6 (Central (CST))
  - Summer (DST): UTC-5 (CDT)
- ZIP Code: 77474 (Sealy)
- Area code: 979
- FIPS code: 48-68978
- GNIS feature ID: 2805587

South Frydek is a city in Austin County, Texas, United States. Initially incorporated as Gloster in May 2019, the name was changed to South Frydek seven months later. The city had a population of 207 at the 2020 census.

== Government ==
Prior to incorporation, South Frydek was part of the unincorporated community of Frydek in southeastern Austin County. As portions of the Frydek community were added to the extraterritorial jurisdiction (ETJ) of nearby Sealy, it fueled an incorporation effort meant to preserve the rural character of the area. On November 4, 2018, approximately 50 residents attended a meeting at the Gloster Aerodrome, and over 45 signatures were collected on a petition to incorporate a portion of Frydek as the city of Gloster. The name 'Gloster' was chosen in recognition of the local airport built in the style of an old English Aerodrome and the nearby Glostershire aviation subdivision.

The incorporation election was held on May 4, 2019. A total of 100 votes were cast, with 86 residents voting in favor of incorporating Gloster as a Type C General-Law municipality, with 14 opposed. Residents were also given the option of choosing a Mayor and two Commissioners in the event that incorporation measure passed. In the mayoral race, Laura Meyer defeated Brandon Hawbaker, 79 votes to 18. Four candidates competed in the Commissioners race. Henry Mlcak received 78 votes, followed by John Couch with 65, John Mathews with 27, and 25 for Michael Blommer. Mlcak and Couch were therefore elected Commissioners. The election results were canvassed at the May 13, 2019 meeting of the Austin County Commissioners Court, formally creating the city of Gloster.

Residents returned to the polls on November 5, 2019, to vote on two propositions. Proposition A was the adoption of the adoption of a one percent local sales and use tax to fund city operations, which passed 56 votes to 28. Proposition B contained two parts. The first asked residents if they favored a change from the name of Gloster, with 64 voting in favor and 22 opposed. With the measure endorsed, the choices of "Mistek" and "South Frydek" were presented as potential names for the city. South Frydek narrowly edged out Mistek, 37 to 33.

== Demographics ==
=== 2020 census ===
As of the 2020 census, South Frydek had a population of 207. The median age was 46.8 years. 19.3% of residents were under the age of 18 and 21.3% of residents were 65 years of age or older. For every 100 females there were 95.3 males, and for every 100 females age 18 and over there were 96.5 males age 18 and over.

0.0% of residents lived in urban areas, while 100.0% lived in rural areas.

There were 85 households in South Frydek, of which 32.9% had children under the age of 18 living in them. Of all households, 63.5% were married-couple households, 14.1% were households with a male householder and no spouse or partner present, and 17.6% were households with a female householder and no spouse or partner present. About 16.4% of all households were made up of individuals and 5.9% had someone living alone who was 65 years of age or older.

There were 85 housing units, of which 0.0% were vacant. The homeowner vacancy rate was 0.0% and the rental vacancy rate was 0.0%.

Racial composition as of the 2020 census
Race	Number	Percent
White	174	84.1%
Black or African American	2	1.0%
American Indian and Alaska Native	4	1.9%
Asian	2	1.0%
Native Hawaiian and Other Pacific Islander	0	0.0%
Some other race	9	4.3%
Two or more races	16	7.7%
Hispanic or Latino (of any race)	29	14.0%

== Education ==
The Sealy Independent School District serves South Frydek.
