= Seeley =

Seeley may refer to:

== People and fictional characters ==
- Seeley (surname)
- Seeley Booth, a fictional character in the American television series Bones
- Seeley G. Mudd (1895-1968), American physician, professor and philanthropist
- Seeley W. Mudd (1861–1926), mining engineer

== Places ==
United States

- Seeley, California, a census-designated place
- Camp Seeley, a US Army World War II training camp near El Centro, California
- Seeley, New Jersey, a census-designated place
- Seeley, Wisconsin, an unincorporated community
- Seeley Lake, Montana, a lake and community
- Seeley Cottage, Harrietstown, New York
- Seeley Farmhouse, Glenville, New York
- Samuel W. Seeley House, Bridgeton, New Jersey
- William Stuart Seeley House, Mount Pleasant, Utah

Canada

- a lake in Seeley Lake Provincial Park, British Columbia

== Other uses ==
- Seeley Historical Library, the history library of the University of Cambridge, England
- Seeley, Service, British publishing firm (1744-1979)

== See also ==
- Sealey
- Sealy (disambiguation)
- Seely
