= Brazos Country, Texas =

City in Texas, United States

- City
- Interactive map of Brazos Country, Texas
- Location within Texas
- Coordinates: 29°45′11″N 96°2′17″W
- Country: United States
- State: Texas
- County: Austin
- Incorporated: 2000

Area
  - Total: 2.00 sq mi (5.19 km^{2})
  - Land: 1.95 sq mi (5.06 km^{2})
  - Water: 0.050 sq mi (0.13 km^{2})

Population (2020)
  - Total: 514
  - Density: 263/sq mi (102/km^{2})
- ZIP code: 77474
- FIPS code: 48-10090
- GNIS feature ID: 1923026
- Website: citybrazoscountry.org

Brazos Country is a residential community in Austin County, Texas, United States. As of the 2020 census, the population was 514.

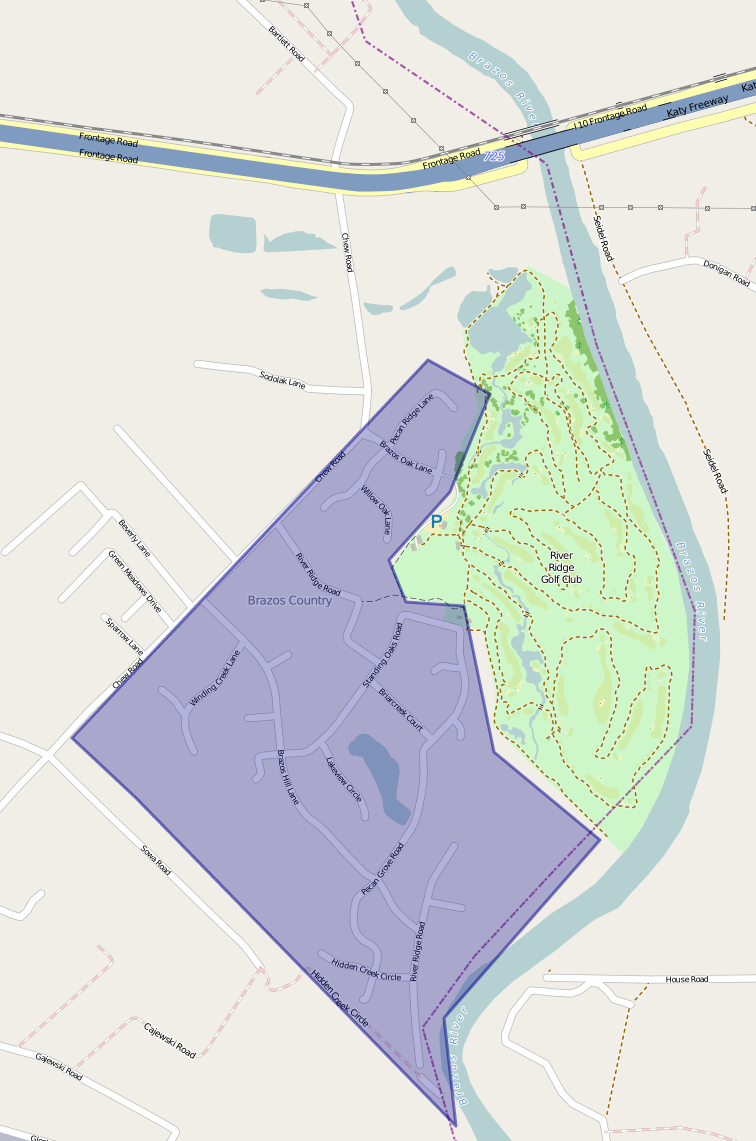
City Map, showing position from I-10

== Geography ==
Brazos Country is located south of Interstate 10 and 7 miles (11 km) southeast of Sealy. Downtown Houston is 43 miles (69 km) to the east. The eastern city limits of Brazos Country run along the west bank of the Brazos River. The only entrances to the city are from Chew Road.

There are several small, unnamed bodies of water within Brazos Country, likely manmade.

Brazos Country is located at 29°45′11″N 96°2′17″W. According to the United States Census Bureau, the city has a total area of 5.5 square miles (14 km^{2}), of which, 5.4 square miles (14 km^{2}) of it is land and 0.1 square miles (0.26 km^{2}) is water.

Historical population
| Census | Pop. | Note | %± |
|---|---|---|---|
| 2010 | 469 | | — |
| 2020 | 514 | | 9.6% |
U.S. Decennial Census; 2020 Census

== Demographics ==
=== 2020 census ===
As of the 2020 census, Brazos Country had a population of 514. The median age was 53.6 years. 14.8% of residents were under the age of 18 and 25.9% of residents were 65 years of age or older. For every 100 females there were 94.7 males, and for every 100 females age 18 and over there were 92.1 males age 18 and over.

0% of residents lived in urban areas, while 100.0% lived in rural areas.

There were 193 households in Brazos Country, of which 25.9% had children under the age of 18 living in them. Of all households, 82.4% were married-couple households, 5.7% were households with a male householder and no spouse or partner present, and 8.8% were households with a female householder and no spouse or partner present. About 8.8% of all households were made up of individuals and 6.7% had someone living alone who was 65 years of age or older.

There were 206 housing units, of which 6.3% were vacant. Among occupied housing units, 97.9% were owner-occupied and 2.1% were renter-occupied. The homeowner vacancy rate was 3.6% and the rental vacancy rate was 50.0%.

Racial composition as of the 2020 census
| Race | Percent |
|---|---|
| White | 91.2% |
| Black or African American | 1.4% |
| American Indian and Alaska Native | 0.2% |
| Asian | 0% |
| Native Hawaiian and Other Pacific Islander | 0% |
| Some other race | 1.6% |
| Two or more races | 5.6% |
| Hispanic or Latino (of any race) | 7.4% |

=== 2010 census ===
As of the 2010 census, the population was 469.

== Government ==
City government is by mayor and city council.

Brazos Country encompasses the River Ridge Golf Club which occupies the west bank of the Brazos River.

== Education ==
It is within the Sealy Independent School District.

== History ==
Development of the area began in the late 1970s, and the city was incorporated in May 2000.
