= A Savage Art: The Life & Cartoons of Pat Oliphant =

2025 documentary film

- Theatrical release poster
- Directed by: Bill Banowsky
- Produced by: Bill Banowsky; Paul O'Bryan
- Cinematography: Mayo Whaley
- Edited by: Dean Alioto; Michael Linn; Mayo Whaley
- Music by: Geneviève Gros-Louis
- Distributed by: Magnolia Pictures
- Release date: 2025
- Running time: 88 minutes
- Country: United States
- Language: English
- Box office: $16,545

A Savage Art: The Life & Cartoons of Pat Oliphant is a 2025 American documentary film about the life of the Pulitzer Prize winning cartoonist Pat Oliphant. It is produced and directed by Bill Banowsky.

== Reception ==
On the review aggregator website Rotten Tomatoes, 85% of 20 critics' reviews are positive, with an average rating of 7.3/10.

Tony Medley gave it a score of 7 out of 10, calling it "interesting", but "politically biased".

Alissa Wilkinson of The New York Times wrote, "[W]here A Savage Art really shines is when it traces the discipline of political cartooning and the satirical edge it's brought to journalism and commentary for centuries."
