= George Sealy =

American businessman (1835–1901)

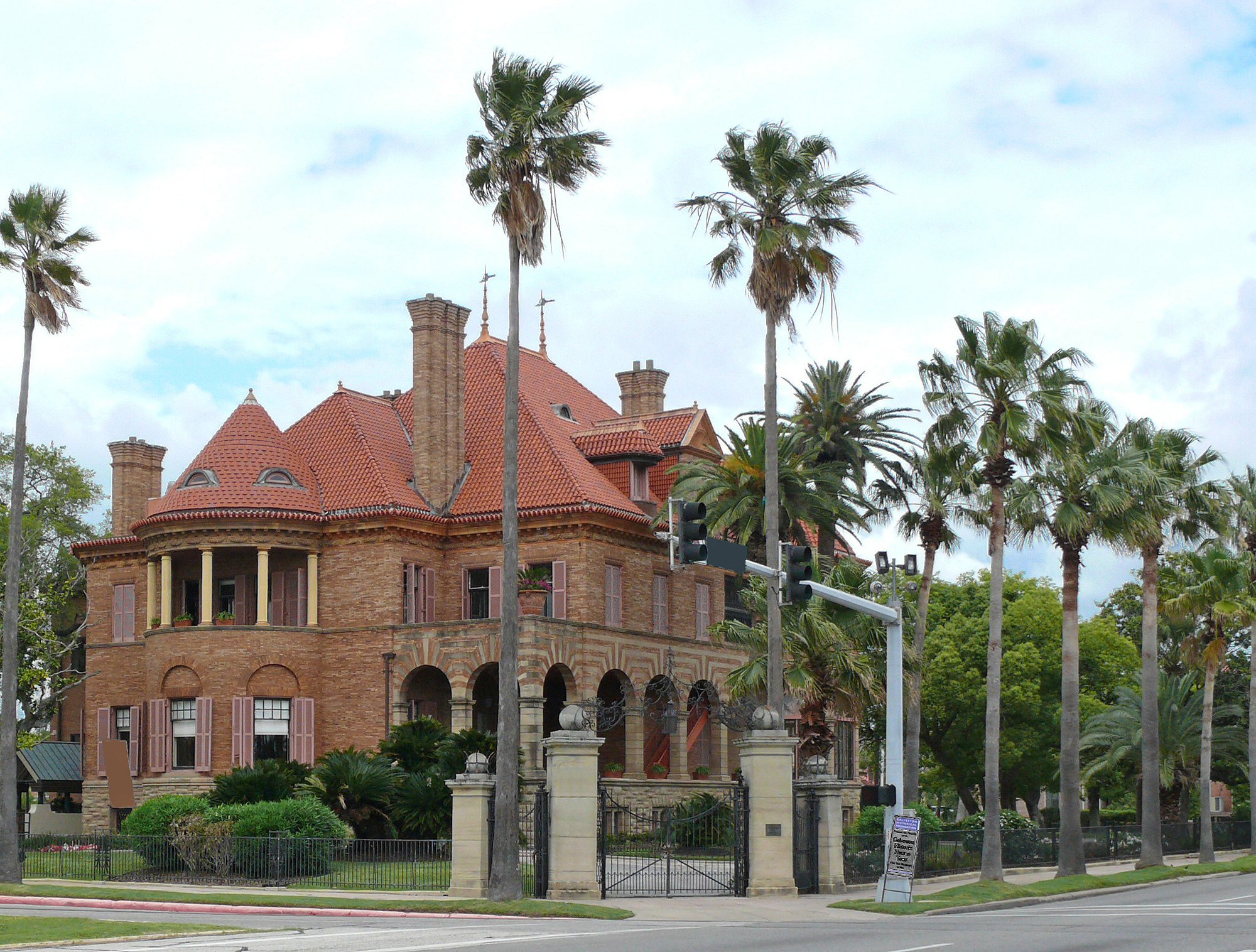
George Sealy Mansion called Open Gates

George Sealy (1835–1901) was a Galveston businessman born in Wilkes-Barre, Pennsylvania. He moved to Texas in 1857 to join his brother, and worked at Ball, Hutchings and Company in Galveston. During the Civil War, he served as a private in the Confederate Army.

== Career ==
Sealy served as treasurer of Gulf, Colorado and Santa Fe Railway. After it went bankrupt, he bought the company at foreclosure, and reorganized the company. New towns were developed along the route of the railroad. Named after officers of the Gulf, Colorado and Santa Fe Railway, they include Rosenberg, Sealy, and Temple.

== Notable Influence ==
- Sealy, Texas, Origin of City name

George Sealy House that Sealy built is listed on the National Register of Historic Places. It is also a Recorded Texas Historic Landmark. Named "Open Gates", the house survived the Galveston Hurricane of 1900, and residents of the house saved Galvestonians by pulling them out of the floodwaters. Open Gates was donated to the University of Texas Medical Branch in 1969 (conveyed in 1979), and it eventually was used as the George and Magnolia Willis Sealy Conference Center.

== Bibliography ==
- Beasley, Ellen; Fox, Stephen (1996). Galveston Architectural Guidebook. Houston: Rice University Press. ISBN 0-89263-345-X.
