= Sealey =

Sealey is a variation of the English and Anglo-Irish surname Sealy.

Notable persons with the name include:

- Alan Sealey (1942–1996), English footballer
- Ben Sealey (1899–1963), Barbadian cricketer
- Joan Sealey (died 1996), Trinidadian politician
- John Sealey (born 1945), English footballer
- Les Sealey (1957–2001), English footballer
- Marger Sealey, Venezuelan singer-songwriter and actress
- Nicole Sealey (born 1979), American poet
- Raphael Sealey (1927–2013), British-American historian of Ancient Greece

== See also ==
- Sealy (disambiguation)
- Seely
- Seeley (disambiguation)
