= Ricky Seals-Jones =

American football player (born 1995)

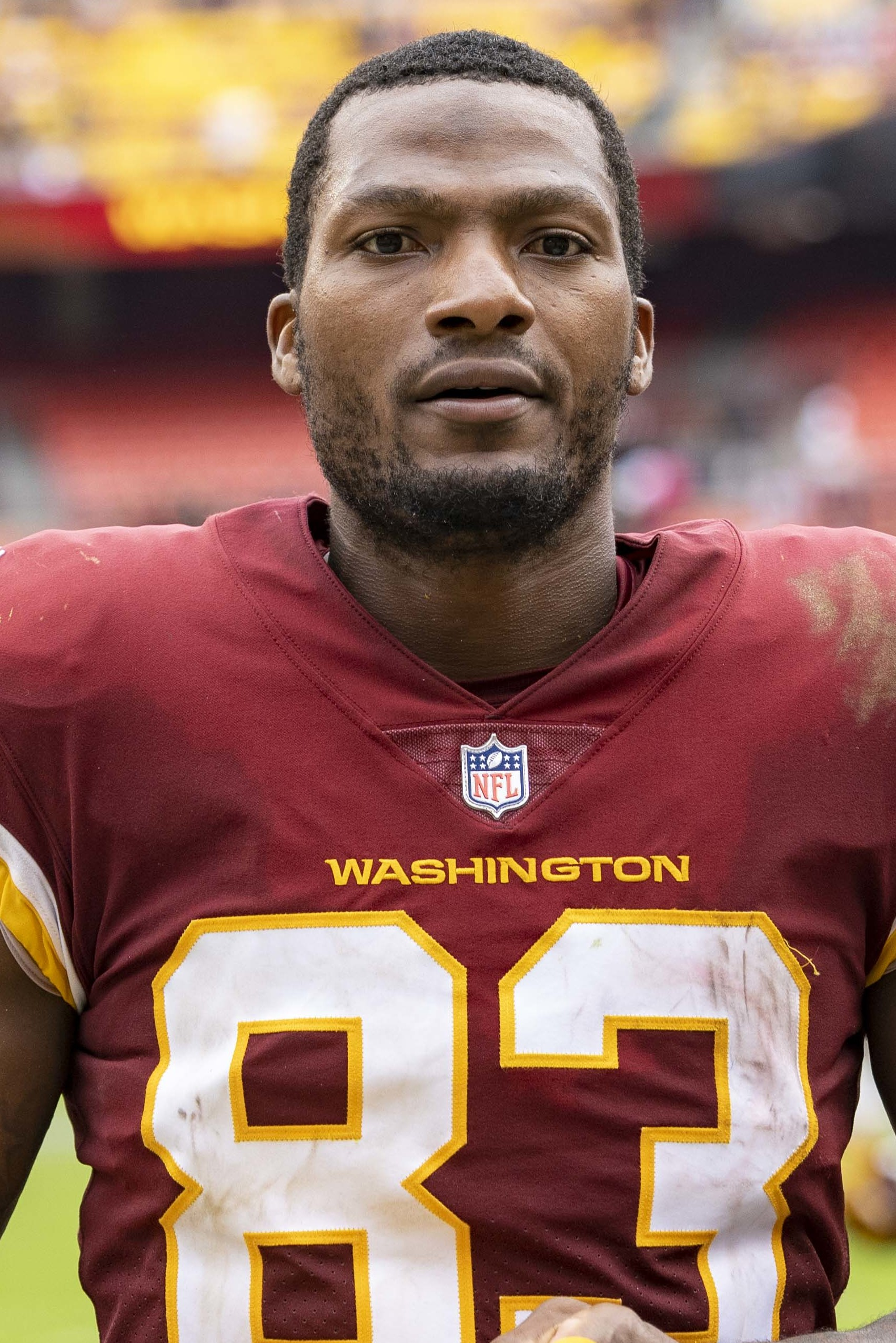
- Seals-Jones with Washington in 2021

No. 83, 86
- Position: Tight end

Personal information
- Born: March 15, 1995 (age 31); Houston, Texas, U.S.
- Listed height: 6 ft 5 in (1.96 m)
- Listed weight: 243 lb (110 kg)

Career information
- High school: Sealy (Sealy, Texas)
- College: Texas A&M (2013–2016)
- NFL draft: 2017: undrafted

Career history
- Arizona Cardinals (2017–2018); Cleveland Browns (2019); Kansas City Chiefs (2020); Washington Football Team (2021); New York Giants (2022)*; Indianapolis Colts (2023)*
- * Offseason or practice squad member only

Career NFL statistics
- Receptions: 90
- Receiving yards: 1,044
- Receiving touchdowns: 10
- Stats at Pro Football Reference

Roderick "Ricky" Seals-Jones (born March 15, 1995) is an American former professional football player who was a tight end in the National Football League (NFL). He played college football for the Texas A&M Aggies as a wide receiver and signed with the Arizona Cardinals as an undrafted free agent in 2017. He was also a member of the Cleveland Browns, Kansas City Chiefs, Washington Redskins, New York Giants and Indianapolis Colts.

== Early life ==
A two-sport athlete at Sealy High School, Seals-Jones was a dominant force at the 3A Texas high school football level and was also named a Parade All-American in basketball.

== College career ==
Seals-Jones played college football at Texas A&M University from 2013 to 2016 under head coach Kevin Sumlin.

As a true freshman in 2013, he ended up redshirting after only appearing in two games before suffering a season-ending injury. In the game against Rice, he had his first three collegiate receptions for 84 yards, which included a 71-yard touchdown reception from quarterback Matt Joeckel.

As a redshirt freshman in 2014, his role in the offense expanded. In the season opener against #9 South Carolina, he recorded five receptions for 67 yards and a touchdown. In the next two games, against Lamar and Rice, he recorded a receiving touchdown in both games. On October 4, in a 48–31 loss against SEC West rival #12 Mississippi State, he had a season-high 10 receptions for 72 yards. He finished his redshirt freshman season with a single reception for 21 yards against West Virginia in the 45–37 victory in the 2014 Liberty Bowl.

As a redshirt sophomore in 2015, he played in all 13 games. On October 3, he scored his first receiving touchdown of the season against #21 Mississippi State. On October 17, he had his best collegiate performance against #10 Alabama with six receptions for 107 yards and a touchdown. He finished out the season with three receptions for 18 yards and a touchdown in the 27–21 defeat to Louisville in the 2015 Music City Bowl.

As a redshirt junior in 2016, his production dropped but still was an important contributor to the Aggies. On September 3, against #16 UCLA in the season opener, he had four receptions for 57 yards in the 31–24 victory. On September 24, against #17 Arkansas, he recorded one reception for 47 yards before suffering a left leg injury. He returned from his injury to play against #1 Alabama over a month later, but only had a single reception for 25 yards in the 33–14 loss. On November 19, against UTSA, he had six receptions for a season-high 75 yards. In his final game with the Aggies, he had six receptions for 34 yards and his lone touchdown of the 2016 season in the 33–28 loss to the Kansas State Wildcats in the 2016 Texas Bowl. After the 2016 season, he decided to enter the 2017 NFL draft.

=== Statistics ===
Year	School	Conf	Pos	G	Rec	Yds	Avg	TD
2013	Texas A&M	SEC	WR	1	3	84	28.0	1
2014	Texas A&M	SEC	WR	11	49	465	9.5	4
2015	Texas A&M	SEC	WR	13	45	560	12.4	4
2016	Texas A&M	SEC	WR	9	26	333	12.8	1
Career					123	1,442	11.7	10

== Professional career ==
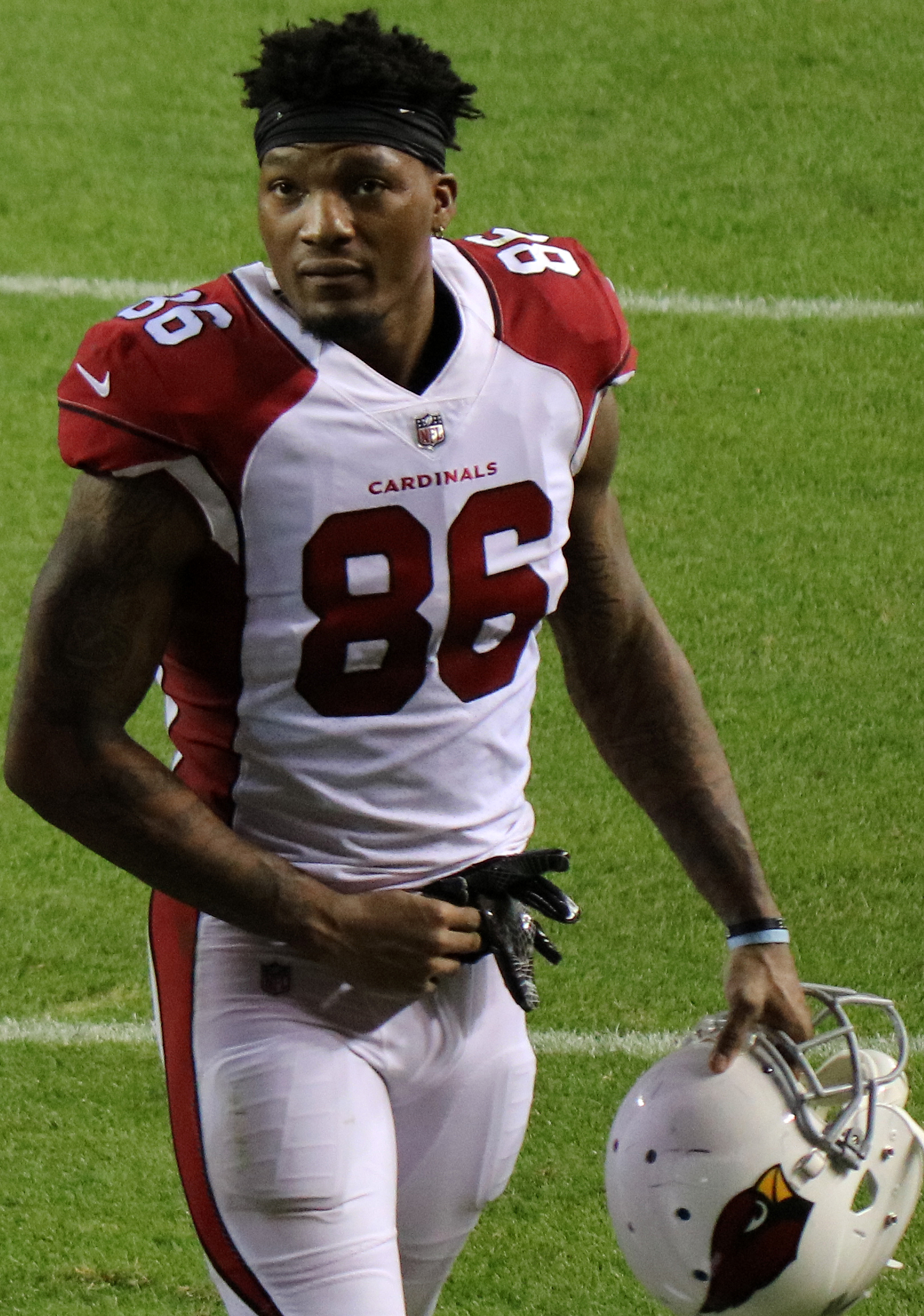
Seals-Jones playing for the Arizona Cardinals in 2017.

Pre-draft measurables
Height	Weight	Arm length	Hand span	40-yard dash	10-yard split	20-yard split	20-yard shuttle	Three-cone drill	Vertical jump	Broad jump	Bench press
6 ft 4 5/8 in (1.95 m)	243 lb (110 kg)	33 1/8 in (0.84 m)	9 5/8 in (0.24 m)	4.69 s	1.53 s	2.75 s	4.33 s	7.46 s	31.0 in (0.79 m)	10 ft 1 in (3.07 m)	17 reps
All values from NFL Combine/Pro Day

=== Arizona Cardinals ===
Seals-Jones was signed by the Arizona Cardinals as an undrafted free agent on May 2, 2017. The Cardinals chose to switch Seals-Jones from a wide receiver to tight end when he reported to training camp. He was waived on September 2, 2017, and was signed to the practice squad the next day. He was promoted to the active roster on September 25, 2017.

On September 25, 2017, in Week 3 against the Dallas Cowboys, he appeared on special teams in his NFL debut. In Week 11, against the Houston Texans, he had recorded three receptions for 54 yards and the first two touchdowns of his professional career. He followed that up with four receptions for 72 yards and a touchdown in the next game against the Jacksonville Jaguars. He finished the season with 12 receptions for 201 yards and three touchdowns in 10 games and one start.

In 2018, Seals-Jones played in 15 games with five starts, recording 34 receptions for 343 yards and one touchdown. Prior to the 2019 season, he was waived by the Cardinals during final roster cuts on August 31, 2019.

=== Cleveland Browns ===
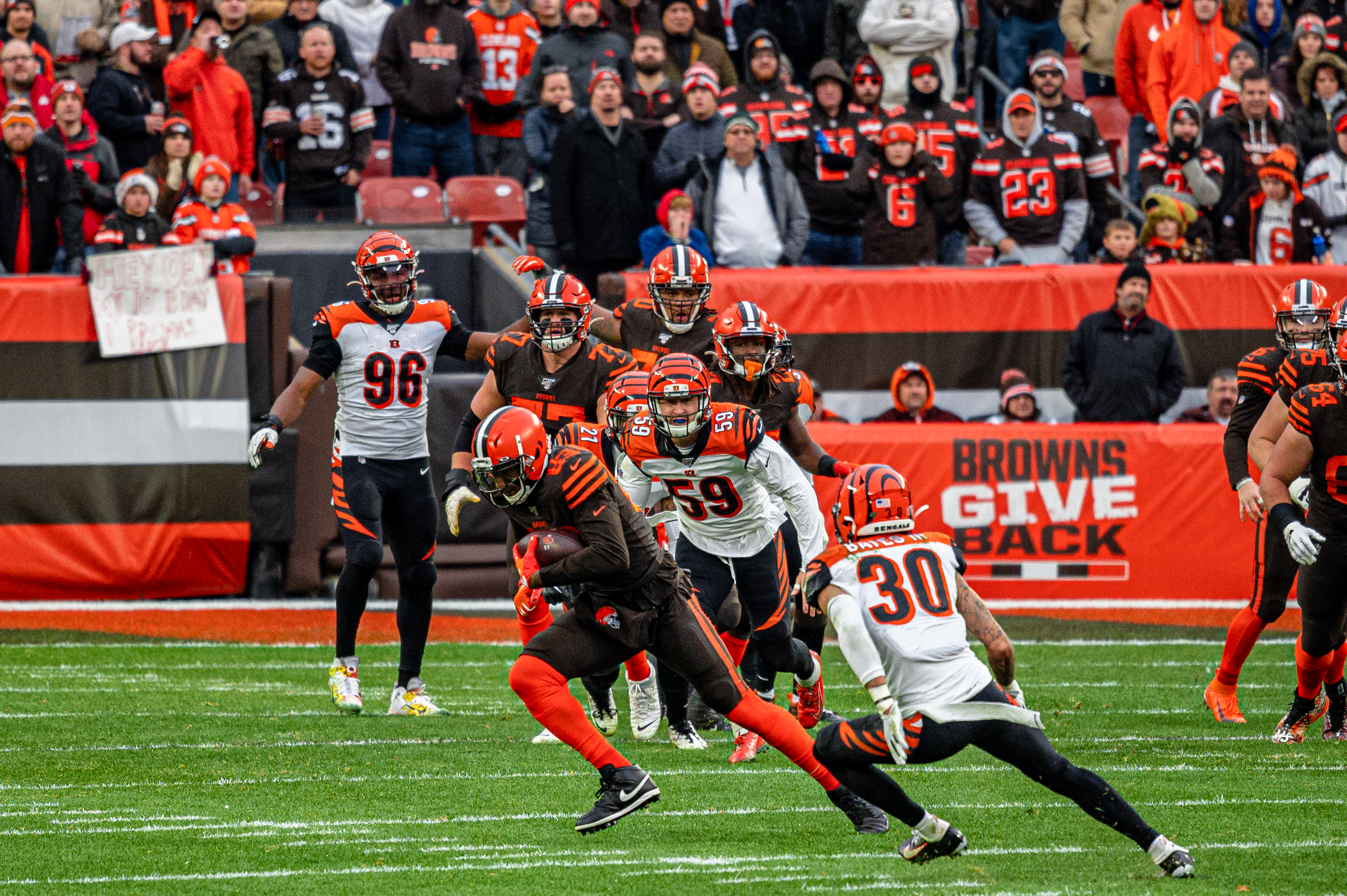
Seals-Jones playing against the Cincinnati Bengals in 2019.

On September 1, 2019, Seals-Jones was claimed off waivers by the Cleveland Browns. In Week 15 against his former team, the Cardinals, Seals-Jones caught three passes for 29 yards and two touchdowns during the 38–24 loss. In the 2019 season, he finished with 14 receptions for 229 receiving yards and four receiving touchdowns.

=== Kansas City Chiefs ===
On April 9, 2020, the Kansas City Chiefs signed Seals-Jones to a one-year contract. He was waived on January 2, 2021, and re-signed to the practice squad four days later. On January 16, 2021, Seals-Jones was promoted to the active roster.

=== Washington Football Team ===
Seals-Jones signed with the Washington Football Team on May 25, 2021. He recorded his first catch with Washington in a Week 2 victory against the New York Giants, making a game winning 19-yard touchdown reception late in the fourth quarter. He was placed on injured reserve on January 8, 2022. He appeared in 13 games in the 2021 season. He finished with 30 receptions for 271 receiving yards and two receiving touchdowns.

=== New York Giants ===
Seals-Jones signed a one-year, $1.2 million contract with the New York Giants on March 18, 2022. On August 23, 2022, he was placed on injured reserve with a toe injury. On September 2, 2022, he was released with an injury settlement.

=== Indianapolis Colts ===
On August 9, 2023, Seals-Jones signed with the Indianapolis Colts. He was placed on injured reserve on August 29, 2023, then released a week later.

== Personal life ==
Seals-Jones is the cousin of Pro Football Hall of Fame running back Eric Dickerson.
