= Seely =

Seely is a variation of the English and Anglo-Irish Sealy surname, and may refer to:

- Brad Seely (born 1956), American football coach
- Charles Seely (politician, born 1803) (1803–1887), British politician
- Sir Charles Seely, 1st Baronet (1833–1915), British industrialist and politician
- Sir Charles Seely, 2nd Baronet (1859–1926), British industrialist, landowner and politician
- Clinton B. Seely (born 1941), American academic and translator
- David Seely, 4th Baron Mottistone (1920–2011), British peer
- Hugh Seely, 1st Baron Sherwood (1898–1970), British politician
- J. E. B. Seely, 1st Baron Mottistone (1868–1947), British soldier and politician
- James M. Seely (1932–2017), American admiral
- Jeannie Seely (1940–2025), American country music singer
- M. W. Seely (1813–1889), Wisconsin state senator
- Tim Seely (1935–2024), British movie and theatre actor

== See also ==
- Seelie (or seely), a Scots epithet applied to færie beings
- Horace Seely-Brown Jr. (1908–1982), American politician
- Sealy (disambiguation)
- Sealey
- Seeley (disambiguation)
