= Seeley (surname) =

Seeley is a variation of the Anglo-Norman Sealy surname. Notable people with the surname include:

- Alastair Seeley (born 1979), Northern Irish motorcycle racer
- Blossom Seeley (1891–1974), American vaudeville performer
- Bob Seeley (born 1928), American boogie woogie pianist
- Colin Seeley (1936–2020), British motorcycle sidecar racer and motorcycle manufacturer
- D. J. Seeley (born 1989), American basketball player in Europe
- Drew Seeley (born 1982), Canadian actor
- Elias P. Seeley (1791–1846), American politician, 11th governor of New Jersey
- George Seeley (footballer) (1877–1921), English footballer
- Gerald Seeley (1903–1941), English cricketer
- Harry Seeley (1839–1909), British paleontologist
- Ken Seeley (born 1962), American television personality
- Janet Seeley (1905–1987), American physical educator
- John Seeley (disambiguation)
- Mabel Seeley (1903–1991), American mystery book author
- Mildred Seeley (1918–2001), American doll collector, doll-related entrepreneur and author on the subject of dolls
- Richard Seeley (born 1979), Canadian ice hockey defenceman
- Robert Seeley (1602–1668), Puritan settler in Massachusetts Bay Colony
- Robert Thomas Seeley (1932–2016), American mathematician
- Stuart William Seeley (1901–1978), American electrical engineer
- Tim Seeley (fl. 2000s), American comic book artist
- Walter Seeley (1941–2019), American boxer
- William Henry Harrison Seeley (1840–1914), the first American citizen to be awarded the Victoria Cross
