= Cummins Creek (Texas) =

Location
- Country: United States
- State: Texas

Physical characteristics
- Mouth
  - location: 29.7239°N 96.5154°W

Cummins Creek in Lee County, Texas, rises near Giddings and runs southeast through Lee, Fayette, and Colorado counties for sixty-five miles to its mouth on a horseshoe bend of the Colorado River, opposite Columbus.

The stream is named for James (Jack) Cummins, one of Stephen F. Austin's Old Three Hundred, who was granted the land at its mouth in 1824. Cummins built a sawmill and gristmill there in 1826. The stream, known to the Spanish as San Benave, was also called Mill Creek before acquiring the name of the pioneer.

Cummins Creek is a major tributary of the Colorado River and was for many years subject to extensive flooding. Throughout its course and along its tributaries a large number of flood-control impoundments built through programs of the United States Department of Agriculture provide both flood protection and opportunities for recreation. Soils along the stream vary in composition but are generally erodible.

Before 1960, the Cummins Creek watershed produced large quantities of cotton and corn. Most of this land has reverted to pasture for cattle and horses. The densely wooded banks, especially along the lower reaches of the creek, provide good stands of native pecans and excellent wildlife habitat.

== See also ==
- List of rivers of Texas
