= Sealy (surname) =

Sealy is an Anglo-Norman surname, arriving in the British Isles with the Norman conquest of England in 1066 (although some claim it originated in Celtic Cornwall prior to the Norman invasion). The name was also found among the Anglo-Irish people of Counties Cork and Kerry in Ireland as far back as the 1500s. Multiple spellings are found throughout British and Irish history: Seally, Sealey, Seeley, Seely, Ceiley, Ceely, Celey, and others. Today the surname is mostly commonly found in the United States and Barbados, while the Sealey form is more common in England.

Notable people with the surname include:

- Alfred Forbes Sealy (1831–1894), British clergyman and educationist in India
- Allan Sealy (born 1951), Indian writer
- Alison Sealy-Smith (born 1959), Canadian actress
- Dante Sealy (born 2003), Trinidadian-American footballer, son of Scott
- Derek Sealy (1912–1982), Barbadian cricketer
- Edward Sealy (1839–1903), Zealand surveyor, photographer, explorer, farmer, and entomologist
- Glenroy Sealy (born 1940), Canadian cricketer
- Jack Sealy (born 1987), English-born Hong Kong footballer
- Jim Sealy (1876–1949), Ireland rugby union player
- Joseph Robert Sealy (1907–2000 ), British botanist
- Lloyd Sealy (1917–1985), American police officer
- Malik Sealy (1970–2000), American basketball player
- Mark Sealy (born 1960), British curator and cultural historian
- Mark Sealy (cricketer), (born 1961), Barbadian cricketer
- Michael Sealy (born 1971), American volleyball coach
- Philip Sealy, Trinidad and Tobago diplomat
- Scott Sealy (born 1981), Trinidadian footballer
- Tony Sealy (born 1959), English footballer
