= James (Jack) Cummins =

James (Jack) Cummins (1773–1849) was a Texas farmer, public official and a colonist of Stephen F. Austin's first settlement in Texas.

== Early life and family ==
James (Jack) Cummins was born circa 1773. He became interested in Texas from as early as July 15, 1819, while operating a salt business on the south side of the Caddo River in Arkansas. He was in Texas before June 1822 and settled on the east bank of the Colorado River, opposite the community at Beason's Ferry, site of the present town of Columbus. While he was returning east to gather his family, an Indian raid destroyed his corn crop, leaving them without provisions when they arrived. Cummins and his wife, Rebecca, were the parents of six children.

== Career ==
He became mayor (alcalde) of San Felipe de Austin on August 16, 1823, and served for four years. On July 5, 1824, as one of Stephen F. Austin's Old Three Hundred, he was granted six leagues and a labor of land in current Colorado and Austin counties. A land bonus was granted to him for his efforts to build both a lumber and grist mill in the new colony. The census of March 1826 listed him as a farmer and stock raiser aged over fifty. His home was a community center on the Colorado River, and he took an active part in all colonial affairs, serving on committees, drafting petitions, and carrying on extensive correspondence with Stephen F. Austin.

He was with the group of settlers who went to Nacogdoches to put down the Fredonian Rebellion, but was too old to fight in the Texas Revolution. He lived on Cummins Creek, now in Colorado County, until his death in 1849.

== Citations ==
- Eugene C. Barker, ed., The Austin Papers (3 vols., Washington: GPO, 1924–28).
- Eugene C. Barker, ed., "Minutes of the Ayuntamiento of San Felipe de Austin, 1828–1832," 12 parts, Southwestern Historical Quarterly 21–24 (January 1918-October 1920).
- Lester G. Bugbee, "The Old Three Hundred: A List of Settlers in Austin's First Colony," Quarterly of the Texas State Historical Association 1 (October 1897). Colorado County Historical Commission, Colorado County Chronicles from the Beginning to 1923 (2 vols., Austin: Nortex, 1986).
