= Angelina Eberly =

American innkeeper and war hero

- Born: July 2, 1798; Sumner County, Tennessee
- Died: August 15, 1860 (aged 62); Indianola, Texas
- Occupation: Innkeeper
- Known for: Texas Archive War

Angelina Belle Peyton Eberly (July 2, 1798 – August 15, 1860) was an innkeeper and a hero of Austin, Texas, during the Texas Archive War.

Angelina was born to John and Margaret (Hamilton) Peyton in Sumner County, Tennessee. In 1818, she married her first cousin, Jonathan C. Peyton, and moved with him to New Orleans, Louisiana. They opened an inn and tavern in San Felipe de Austin from 1825 to 1834, when Jonathan Peyton died. Angelina continued to operate the inn and tavern until the Texas Revolution, when the town was destroyed to prevent capture by Mexican forces.

In 1836, she met and married Captain Jacob Eberly, a widower. They lived briefly in Bastrop, Texas, and moved to Austin, in 1839, opening the Eberly House. On October 18, 1839, President Mirabeau B. Lamar and his cabinet dined in her tavern, and his successor, Sam Houston, resided at Eberly House rather than the presidential mansion. Jacob Eberly died in 1841.

In December 1842, Houston ordered the secret removal of the archives of the Republic to safekeeping in Washington-on-the-Brazos. Mrs. Eberly, realizing that the symbols of national government were being removed from the city, fired a six-pound cannon into the General Land Office Building, which aroused the town to what it considered to be theft. The ensuing conflict became known as the Archive War, which was won by the Austinites and preserved Austin as capital of Texas and keeper of the archives.

In April 1847, Angelina moved to Port Lavaca and operated Edward Clegg's Tavern House. The next year, she moved to Indianola and ran the American Hotel there until her death in 1860, at the age of 62. She was buried in a cemetery outside Lavaca and left her $50,000 estate to her grandson, Peyton Bell Lytle.

A bronze statue of Angelina Eberly, created by Pat Oliphant, stands near the place where Eberly helped preserve Austin as Texas' capital city.

== See also ==
- Mary Hays
