= San Felipe, Texas =

- Town
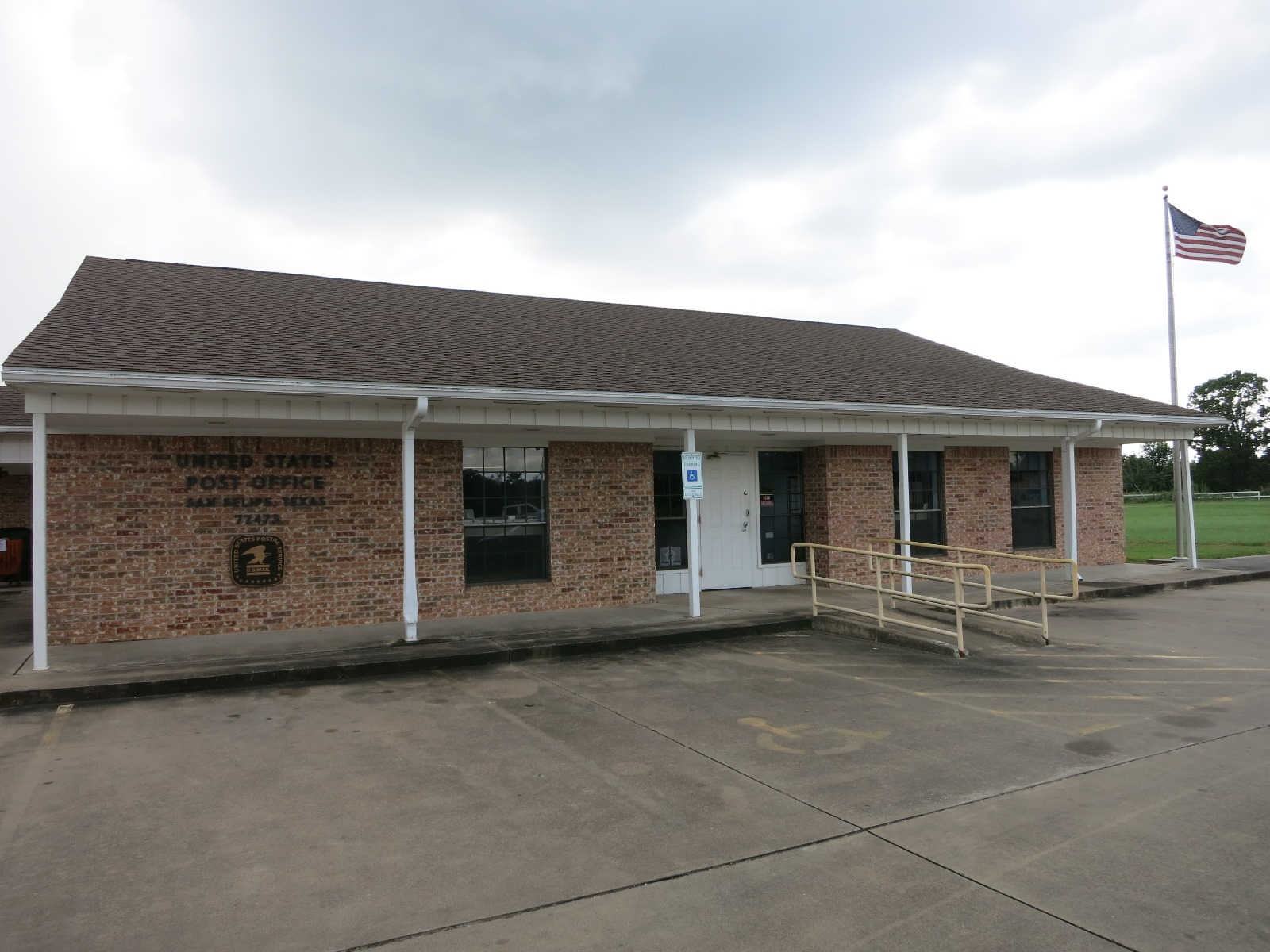
- San Felipe Post Office

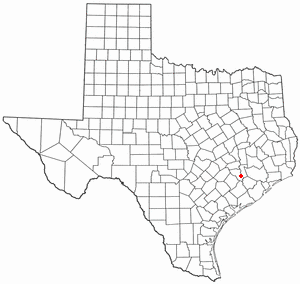
- Location of San Felipe, Texas

- Coordinates: 29°47′40″N 96°6′17″W
- Country: United States
- State: Texas
- County: Austin
- Incorporated: November 18, 1837

Area
  - Total: 8.66 sq mi (22.42 km^{2})
  - Land: 8.36 sq mi (21.65 km^{2})
  - Water: 0.30 sq mi (0.77 km^{2})
- Elevation: 154 ft (47 m)

Population (2020)
  - Total: 691
  - Density: 82.7/sq mi (31.9/km^{2})
- Time zone: UTC-6 (Central (CST))
  - Summer (DST): UTC-5 (CDT)
- ZIP code: 77473
- Area code: 979
- FIPS code: 48-65372
- GNIS feature ID: 1346329
- Website: townofsanfelipe.net

San Felipe (/ˌsæn fɪˈliːp/ SAN fi-LEEP), also known as San Felipe de Austin, is a town in Austin County, Texas, United States. The town was the social, economic, and political center of the early Stephen F. Austin colony. Its population was 691 at the 2020 census.

== History ==
In 1823, John McFarland operated a ferry on the Brazos River near this location. In the fall of the same year, the site was chosen by Stephen F. Austin, with the help of Felipe Enrique Neri, Baron de Bastrop, to be the main site in Texas for American colonization. Founded in 1824 as San Felipe de Austin, the town served as the capital of Stephen F. Austin's first colony and the founding site of the Texas Rangers.

By 1828, San Felipe had been surveyed, with Calle Commercio laid out as the main commercial street. Austin and his secretary, Samuel May Williams, both resided in log cabins on the square. Of about 30 buildings, at least one was a wood-framed structure. Also on the square was the tavern of Jonathan Peyton. Starting in 1830, James (Jack) Cummins operated a nearby lumber mill and grist mill, and about the same time, settlers raised livestock in the area.

By 1835, the town's population had increased to around 600.

It was home to the first post office and one of the earliest newspapers and land offices in Texas. San Felipe was second only to San Antonio as a commercial center of Texas.

The Texas conventions of 1832 and 1833 and the Consultation of November 3, 1835, were held here. San Felipe acted as the capital for the provisional government of Texas until the Convention of 1836. The town was burned in 1836 to prevent the Mexican army from capturing it, and rebuilt a few years later, but never regained its popularity. The oldest post office in Texas is located here (ZIP code 77473).

Local residents dedicated the original townsite as a commemorative site in 1928. In 1940, the town of San Felipe donated most of the original townsite property to the state, which is now the San Felipe de Austin State Historic Site.

== Geography ==
San Felipe is located in eastern Austin County at 29°47′40″N 96°6′17″W, along the west bank of the Brazos River. The town limits extend south below Interstate 10, with access at Exit 723. Sealy is 3 miles (5 km) to the west, and downtown Houston is 46 miles (74 km) to the east. Stephen F. Austin State Park is located in the northern part of the town.

According to the United States Census Bureau, the town has a total area of 8.7 square miles (23 km^{2}), of which 0.3 sq mi (0.78 km^{2}) is covered by water.

=== Climate ===
The climate in this area is characterized by hot, humid summers and generally mild to cool winters. According to the Köppen climate classification, San Felipe has a humid subtropical climate, Cfa on climate maps.

== Demographics ==
Historical population
Census	Pop.	Note	%±
1880	156		—
1890	177		13.5%
1900	241		36.2%
1910	206		−14.5%
1920	451		118.9%
1930	313		−30.6%
1940	305		−2.6%
1950	296		−3.0%
1960	367		24.0%
1970	422		15.0%
1980	532		26.1%
1990	618		16.2%
2000	868		40.5%
2010	747		−13.9%
2020	691		−7.5%
U.S. Decennial Census

The population of the town was 747 at the 2010 census.

As of the census of 2000, 868 people, 312 households, and 234 families resided in the town. The population density was 103.7 inhabitants per square mile (40.0/km^{2}). The 347 housing units averaged 41.5/sq mi (16.0/km^{2}). The racial makeup of the town was 60.83% White, 34.56% African American, 0.35% Native American, 3.00% from other races, and 1.27% from two or more races. Hispanics or Latinos of any race were 9.45% of the population.

Of the 312 households, 29.8% had children under 18 living with them, 57.7% were married couples living together, 13.5% had a female householder with no husband present, and 24.7% were not families. About 23.1% of all households were made up of individuals, and 8.3% had someone living alone who was 65 or older. The average household size was 2.78 and the average family size was 3.26.

In the town, the population was distributed as 27.8% under 18, 8.1% from 18 to 24, 22.9% from 25 to 44, 27.0% from 45 to 64, and 14.3% who were 65 or older. The median age was 39 years. For every 100 females, there were 102.3 males. For every 100 females age 18 and over, there were 92.3 males.

The median income for a household in the town was $38,203, and for a family was $43,558. Males had a median income of $31,667 versus $22,500 for females. The per capita income for the town was $17,169. About 9.1% of families and 9.1% of the population were below the poverty line, including 3.1% of those under age 18 and 16.0% of those age 65 or over.

== Education ==
San Felipe is served by the Sealy Independent School District.

== Notable people ==
- Stephen F. Austin, founder of the Austin Colony and "Father of Texas"
- Angelina Eberly, gained fame in the "Archives War", fought to keep the capital (then Austin) from being moved.
- William Barret Travis, attorney and Texian revolutionary, Texian commander of the Alamo
- Cedric Watson, zydeco fiddle player
