= ACLU of Colorado =

Nonprofit legal advocacy organization based in the U.S. state of Colorado

The American Civil Liberties Union of Colorado is a civil rights organization in the United States, and it is the Colorado affiliate of the American Civil Liberties Union.

== Larry Tajiri Media Award ==
In 1965, the ACLU of Colorado set up awards in honor of former board members Larry Tajiri and Edwin M. Sears.

== History ==
In 2020, the ACLU of Colorado filed a lawsuit on the behalf of a police brutality victim in Aurora and brought attention to similar cases in the city. In the same year, the ACLU of Colorado worked with Aurora in their search for a new police chief in the wake of the death of Elijah McClain.

The ACLU of Colorado has worked to expand voter rights in the state.

In 2020, the ACLU of Colorado sued Teller County for information sharing between the sheriff's department and U.S. Immigration and Customs Enforcement.

In 2024, the ACLU of Colorado sued Elizabeth School District for banning 19 books.
