= Sealy High School =

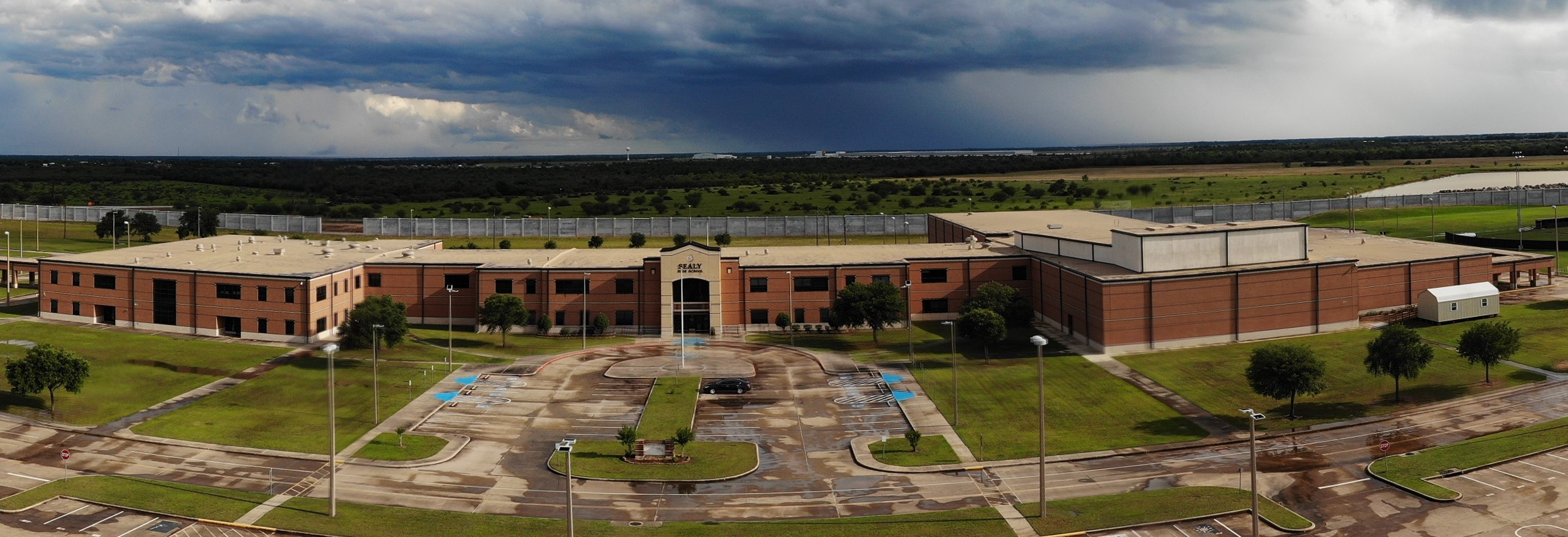
- Aerial view

Location
- 2372 Championship Drive; Sealy, Austin County, Texas 77474-3211; United States; 29.7622°N 96.1744°W

Information
- School type: Public, high school
- Status: Open
- Locale: Rural: Fringe
- School district: Sealy ISD
- NCES District ID: 4839630
- Superintendent: Bryan Hallmark
- NCES School ID: 483963004502
- Principal: Megan Oliver
- Faculty: 66.97 (on an FTE basis)
- Grades: 9–12
- Enrollment: 943 (2023–2024)
- Student to teacher ratio: 14.08
- Colors: Black, gold and white
- Athletics conference: UIL Class AAAA
- Mascot: Tiggy The Tiger
- Website: shs.sealyisd.com

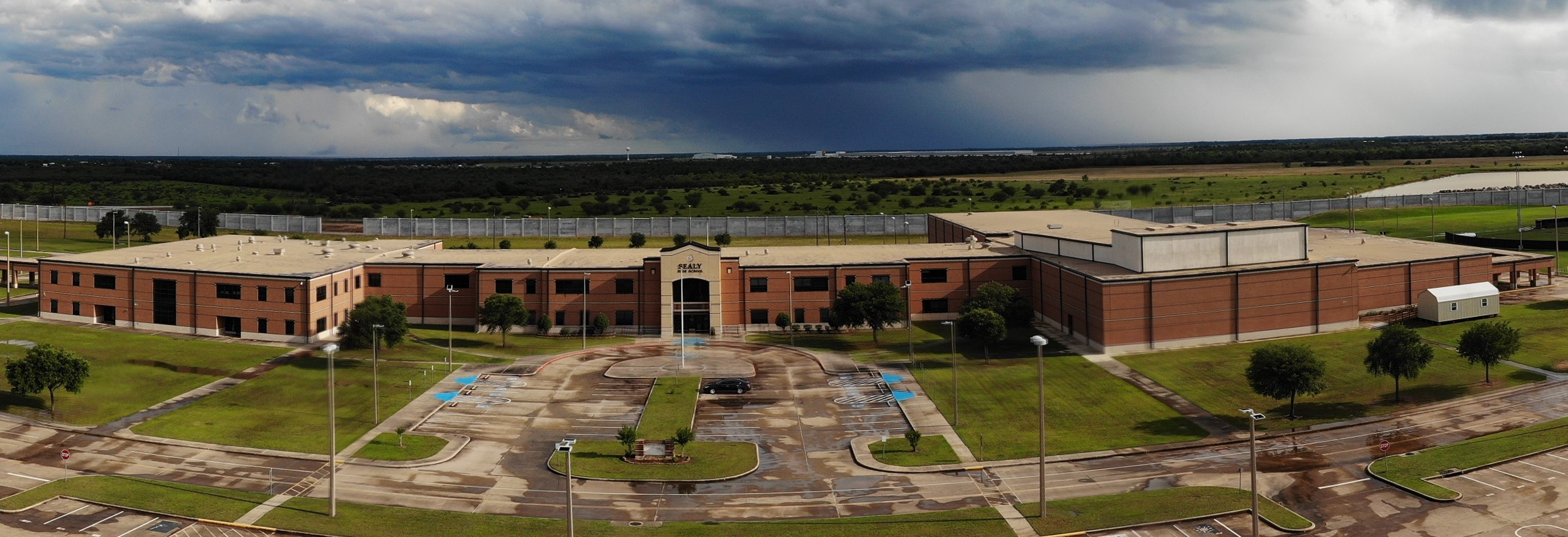
Sealy High School

Sealy High School (SHS) is a public high school located in the city of Sealy, Texas and classified as a 4A school by the University Interscholastic League. It is a part of the Sealy Independent School District located in southern Austin County. During 2023–2024, Sealy High School had an enrollment of 943 students and a student to teacher ratio of 14.08. The school received an overall rating of "B" from the Texas Education Agency for the 2024–2025 school year.

== History ==
A new, multimillion-dollar campus was constructed in 2005. In 2005 SHS struggled with unacceptable scores on the Texas Assessment of Knowledge and Skills (TAKS) test. However, it regained its acceptable state rankings in 2006 testing.

== Athletics ==
The Sealy Tigers compete in the following sports

- Baseball
- Basketball
- Cross Country
- Football
- Golf
- Powerlifting
- Soccer
- Softball
- Tennis
- Track and Field
- Volleyball

=== State Titles ===
Sealy (UIL)

- Football
  - 1978(2A), 1994(3A), 1995(3A), 1996(3A), 1997(3A)
- Boys Track
  - 1971(2A), 1972(2A)

Sealy Austin County (PVIL)

- Football
  - 1956(PVIL-A)

== Notable alumni ==
- Eric Dickerson - Hall of Fame NFL player
- Ricky Seals-Jones - NFL player with the New York Giants
