= Texas Archive War =

Historical event

Date	December 30–31, 1842
Location	Austin, Republic of Texas
Result	Texas national archives retained in Austin

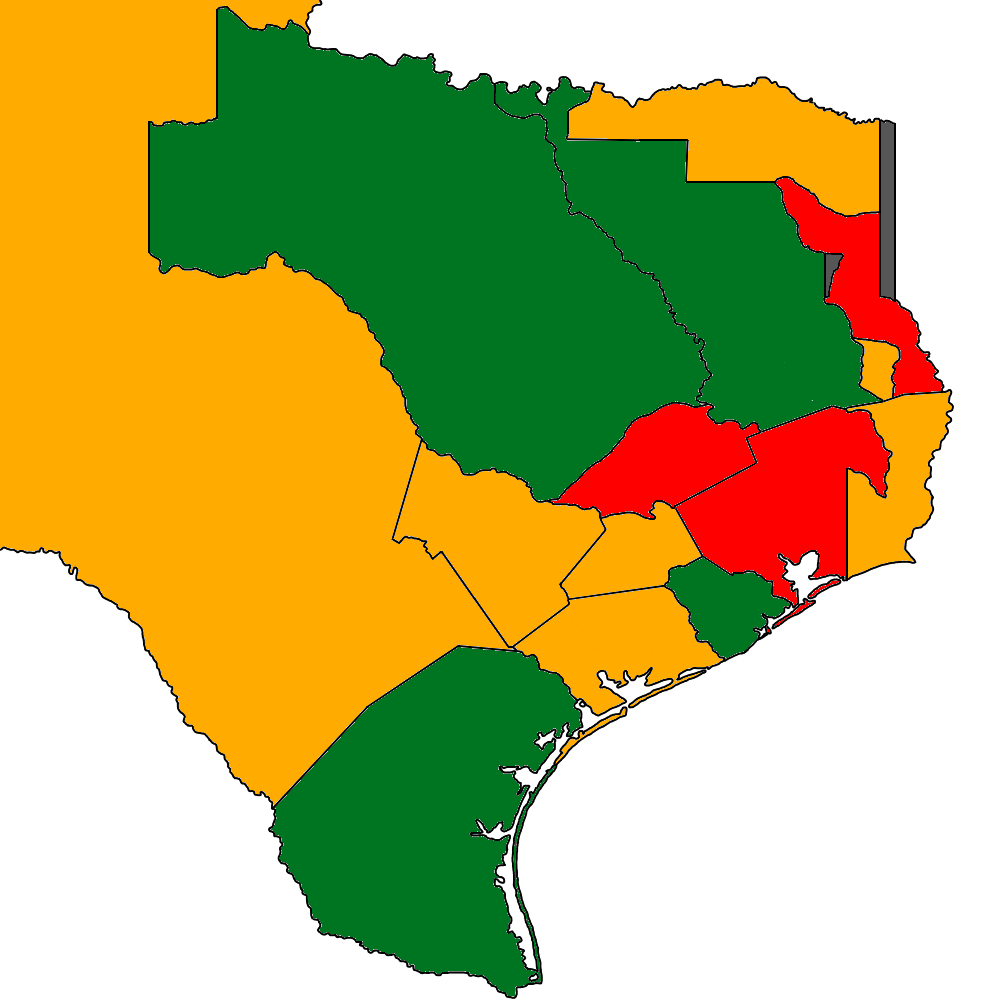
A map of senatorial districts of Texas during the 3rd session, showing the results of the vote to relocate the capital. Orange denotes for (Move) and green (Stay), while red means that the Senator from that district was absent. Districts in gray show land not claimed by a district or an undefined border.

The Texas Archive War was an 1842 dispute over an attempted move of the Republic of Texas national archives from Austin to Houston and, more broadly, over President Sam Houston's efforts to re-establish Houston as the capital of Texas.

== Background ==
The Republic of Texas was formed in 1836. As the Texas Revolution continued, the papers that documented the workings of the interim government accompanied government officials as they evacuated to various towns to stay in front of the Mexican Army. After the war ended in April, Columbia became the nation's capital city, and the archives were located there. The center of government and the archives were then moved to Houston after it was legislated to be the capital of Texas on December 15, 1836.

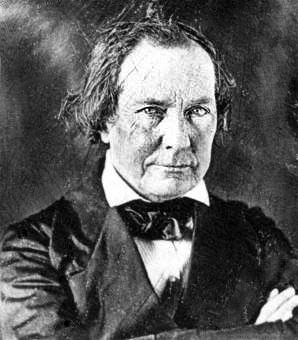
President Mirabeau B. Lamar moved the archives to Austin

In 1839, Mirabeau B. Lamar became President of Texas. Under his influence, the Texas Congress authorized the establishment of a planned city to serve as the seat of government. The new city, Austin, was at the edge of the frontier, near several hostile native tribes, with no easy way to get supplies. Proponents of the move predicted that when the rest of the nation was settled, Austin would be the population center.

The opposition, led by former President Sam Houston, wanted the government to remain near the current population center, along the Gulf Coast. The nation's archives were moved to Austin between August 26 and October 14, 1839. Fifty wagons were used. Lamar and his cabinet arrived on October 17. Over the next several years, the Comanche staged several raids near Austin. Citizens in the Houston area and the Houston Morning Star editorial board used them as evidence to support their argument that the capital and the archives should be returned to Houston.

Sam Houston was elected president again in September 1841, but did not start his second term until the December of 1841. His margin of victory was so large that he assumed a mandate to implement his priorities, including moving the capital. Congress continued to reject proposals to move the archives.

== Prelude ==
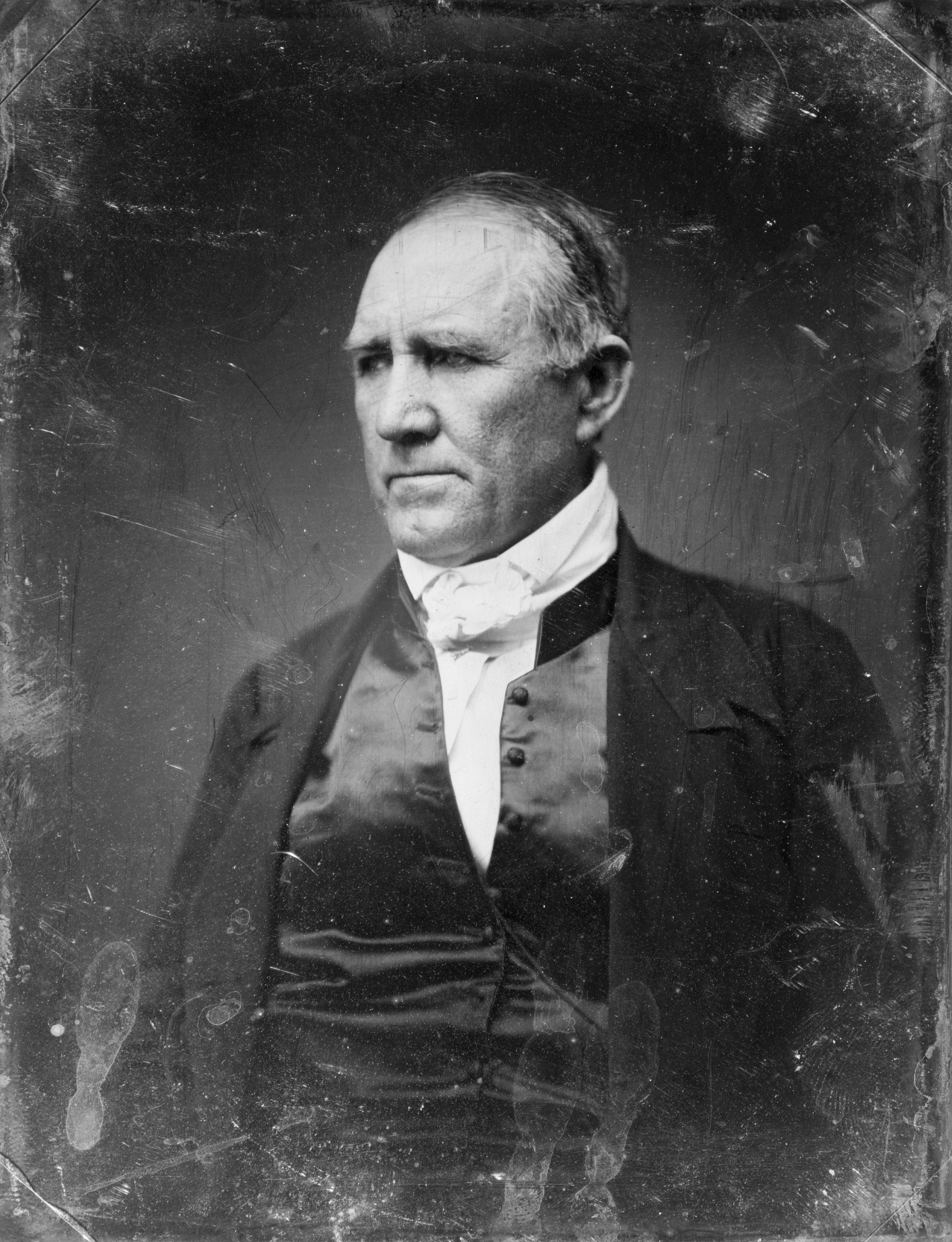
President Sam Houston supported moving the archives

Congress adjourned in February 1842. The following month, Mexican troops, under General Rafael Vásquez, invaded Texas. By March 5, over 1,000 Mexican soldiers were camped in San Antonio. Several days later, a committee of vigilance in Austin recommended martial law and ordered residents to evacuate. A small number of people remained. President Houston returned to the city that bore his name.

Vásquez retreated after a few days. Sam Houston may not have known of that, and on March 10, he ordered George Washington Hockley, Secretary of War, to move the archives to Houston. As justification, he cited the part of the Constitution of the Republic of Texas that stated, "The president and heads of departments shall keep their offices at the seat of government, unless removed by the permission of Congress, or unless, in case of emergency in time of war, the public interest may require their removal."

Colonel Henry Jones, the military commander in Austin, convened a group of citizens to discuss Houston's order. Public sentiment was that Austin was safe and that Houston's departure had created a lack of confidence in the city, which had resulted in devalued real estate. On March 16, the committee of vigilance resolved that removing the archives was against the law. It formed a patrol at Bastrop to search every wagon and to seize any government records found. Sam Houston's private secretary, W.D. Miller, wrote to him that Austin residents "would much rather take their rifles to prevent a removal [of the archives] than to fight Mexicans." To resolve the issue, the president called a special session of Congress, which convened in Houston on June 27, 1842. Congress took no action to move the capital.

== Conflict ==
In September 1842, General Arián Woll led another Mexican expedition into Texas and temporarily captured San Antonio. Houston convened the Seventh Texas Congress at Washington-on-the-Brazos. In his introductory remarks, Houston demanded that Congress support the removal of the archives over the protests of the "seditious" citizens of Austin and asserted that "as to the propriety and necessity of the act no reasonable doubt could exist." On December 9, Senator Greer proposed "A Bill to provide for the safety of the National Archives." The vote to suspend the rules to allow the bill to pass quickly resulted in a tie. Senate President Edward Burleson, who did not like Sam Houston, cast the deciding vote against the bill. Undeterred, on December 10, Greer introduced another bill to move the Texas General Land Office. He left blank the name of the city to which the office should be moved, which resulted in weeks of debate as to which city should be so honored.

On December 10, Houston privately tasked Colonel Thomas I. Smith and Captain Eli Chandler with moving the nation's archives to Washington-on-the-Brazos. Houston wrote, "The importance of removing the public archives and government stores from their present dangerous situation at the City of Austin to a place of security, is becoming daily more and more imperative. While they remain where they are, no one knows the hour when they may be utterly destroyed." The men were encouraged to raise a small troop on the premise of conducting an excursion against the native tribes and then to secure the archives quickly and to transport them.

Smith led over 20 men and 3 wagons into Austin the morning of December 30, 1842. The men were almost finished loading the wagons with papers when they were noticed by Angelina Eberly, the owner of a nearby boarding house. Eberly ran to Congress Avenue, where a six-pound howitzer was situated. She turned the small cannon toward the General Land Office and fired it. Although some shot hit the General Land Office, there was no real damage, and no one was injured.

Smith and his men left quickly and headed northeast to avoid the men patrolling the road through Bastrop. They were accompanied by two clerks from the General Land Office, who were tasked with ensuring the General Land Office records were not harmed or modified. Their progress was slow since a downpour made roads almost impassable for the already slowly-moving oxen. The group managed to travel 18 miles (29 km) before it stopped for the night at Kenney's Fort, along Brushy Creek.

In Walnut Creek, north of Austin, some of Houston's agents were surpassed by angry citizens who then recovered some of the stolen documents and returned them to Austin.

In Austin, Captain Mark Lewis gathered a group of men to retrieve the archives. Some of the pursuers had no horses, and some had little or no weaponry. Lewis's men reached Smith's encampment in the middle of the night. They were undetected since Smith had neglected to post guards. On the morning of December 31, the records were returned to Austin. It is uncertain as to whether Smith's men took them back, or the Austin group took custody of the records and transported them.

== Aftermath ==
The Texas House of Representatives formed a committee to investigate the attempted transferral of the archives. The committee admonished President Houston for his actions in trying to move the capital from Austin without the approval of Congress. A Senate committee reported that they did not agree that Austin should be the capital, but without an immediate threat to the city, Houston had no legal reason to move the records. In 1843, the Senate voted that the archives should be moved if there was not peace with Mexico. The vote was again tied, but this time Burleson cast his deciding vote in favor of the bill. The Texas House rejected it.

The Senate also issued a resolution encouraging Houston to move the governmental agencies back to Austin. Nevertheless, the legislature and government offices continued to run from Washington-on-the-Brazos. Former president Lamar received a letter in March 1843 that said the town of Austin was almost deserted; most businesses were closed, but the archives were still present.

On July 4, 1845, a convention met in Austin to consider the annexation of Texas to the United States. At that time, the governmental records created in Washington-on-the-Brazos were transferred to Austin, creating a single archive.

A bronze statue of Angelina Eberly was placed on Congress Avenue in downtown Austin in the summer of 2004.

== Sources ==
- Spaw, Patsy McDonald (1991), The Texas Senate: Republic to Civil War, 1836–1861, Volume 1 of The Texas Senate, College Station: Texas A&M University Press, ISBN 978-0-89096-442-2
- Winfrey, Dorman H. (October 1960), "The Texan Archive War of 1842", Southwestern Historical Quarterly, 64 (2), Texas State Historical Association: 171–184
