= John Seeley =

John Seeley may refer to:

- John E. Seeley (1810–1875), U.S. representative from New York
- Sir John Robert Seeley (1834–1895), English essayist and historian
- John Seeley (politician, born 1872) (1872–1932), American physician and state senator in New York
- John Ronald Seeley (1913–2007), British sociologist and author

== See also ==
- J. E. B. Seely, 1st Baron Mottistone (John Edward Bernard Seely, 1868-1947), British Army officer and politician
- John Seely, 2nd Baron Mottistone (1899–1963), British architect, son of the above
