= William Stuart Seeley House =

- U.S. National Register of Historic Places
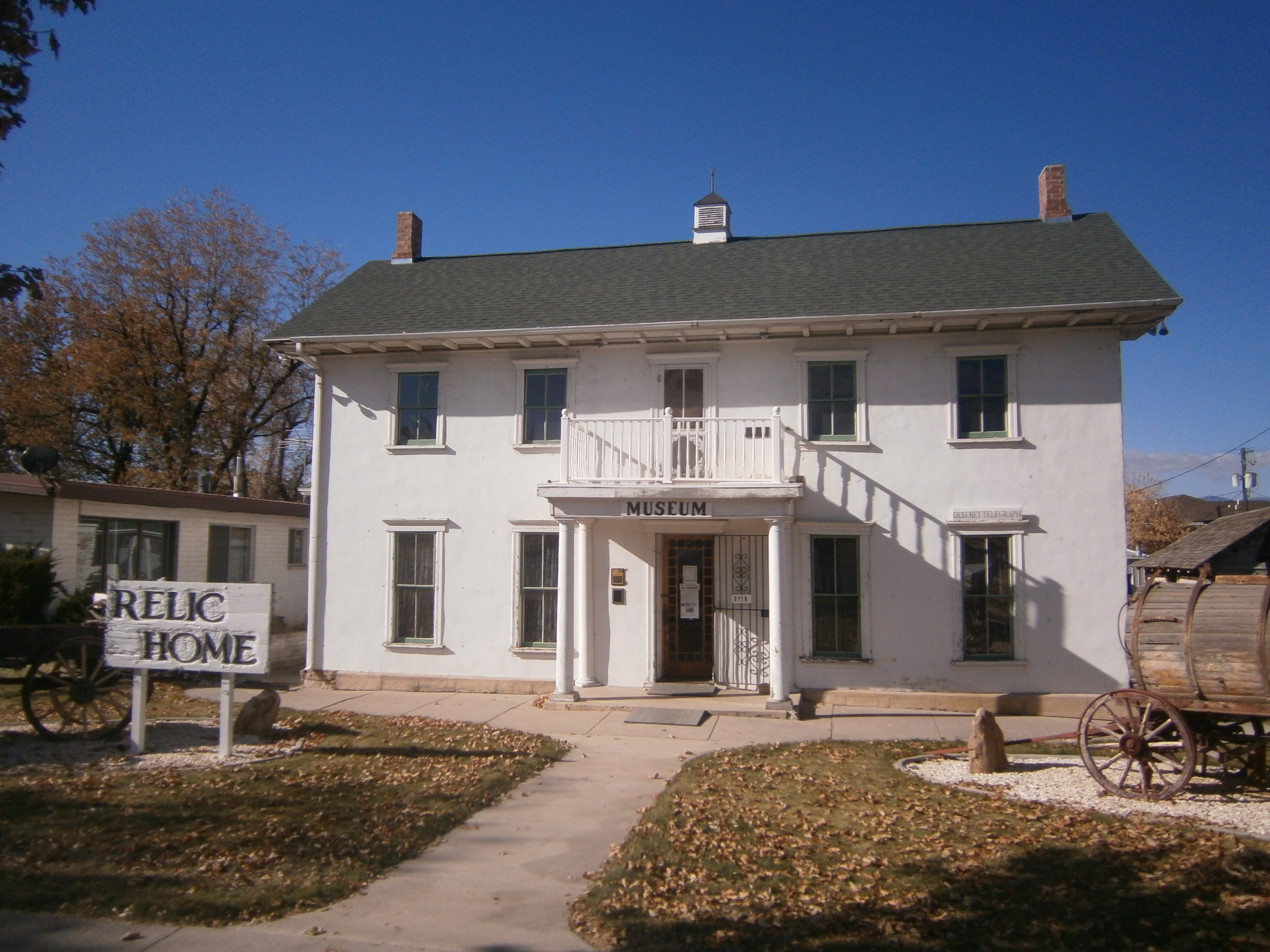

- Location within Utah Location within the United States
- Location: 150 South State Street, Mt. Pleasant, Utah
- Coordinates: 39°32′41″N 111°27′18″W
- Area: 0.3 acres (0.12 ha)
- Built: 1861
- Built by: William S. Seeley (probable)
- Architectural style: Greek Revival, Late Victorian
- NRHP reference No.: 92000894
- Added to NRHP: July 16, 1992

The William Stuart Seeley House is a historic house in Mount Pleasant, Utah. It was built in 1861, probably by William Stuart Seeley, an immigrant from Canada who converted to the Church of Jesus Christ of Latter-day Saints with his wife before moving to Nauvoo, Illinois. They relocated to Utah in 1847, and he was among Mormon settlers to move to a fort in Mount Pleasant in 1849. Seeley served as the bishop of Mount Pleasant for 29 years, and he was the first mayor of Mount Pleasant. He had ten children with his first wife, née Elizabeth DeHart, who died in 1872. The peace treaty of the Black Hawk War was reported signed in this house in 1872. Seeley later married Ellen Carter, with whom he had two children, and Ann Watkins, with whom he had two more children. Seeley died in 1895. The house has been listed on the National Register of Historic Places since July 16, 1992.
