= Sealy Independent School District =

School district in Texas, United States

Coordinates: 29°46′21″N 96°9′39″W

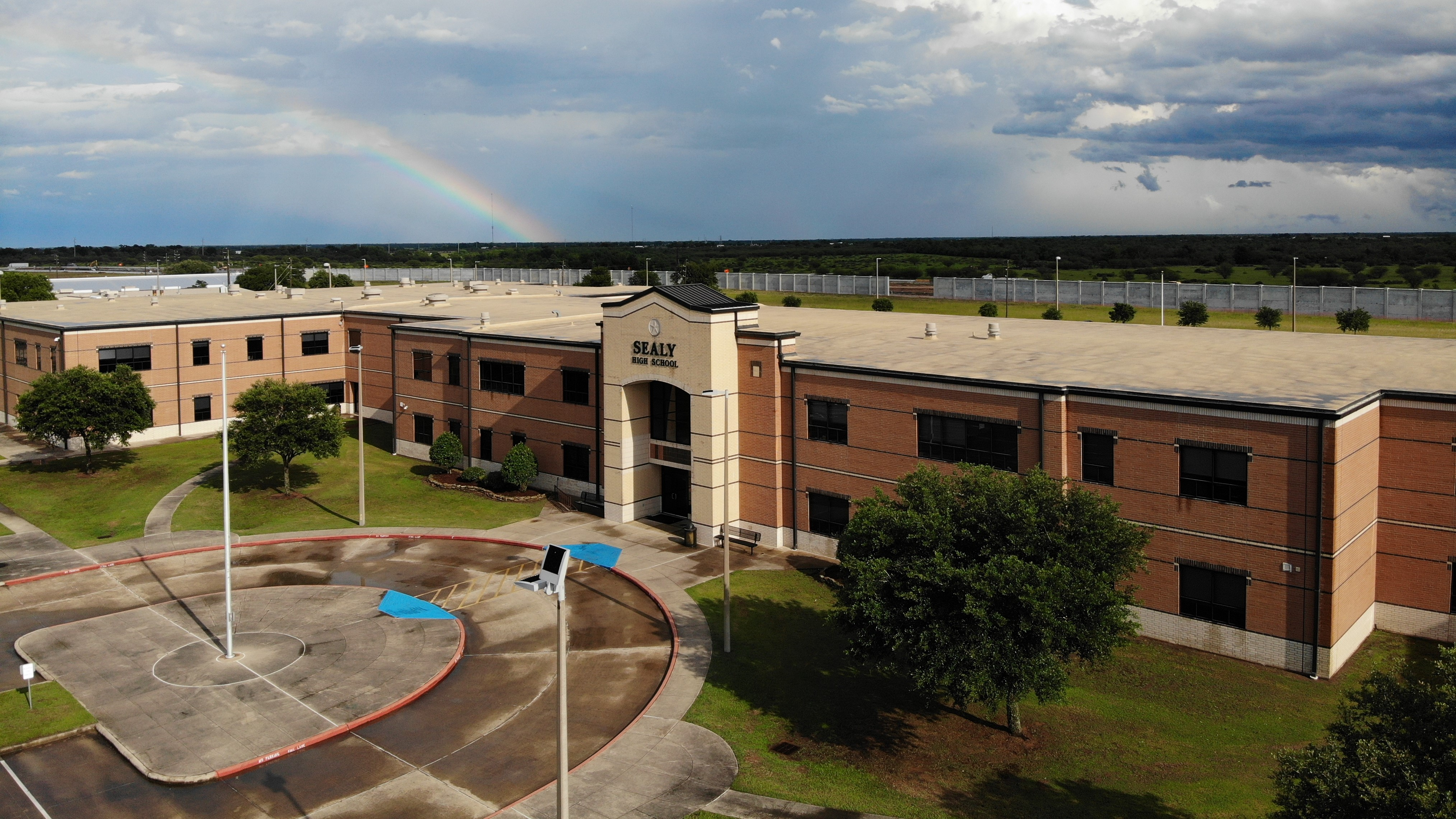
- Sealy High School

Address
- 939 Tiger Lane ESC Region 6 Sealy, Texas, 77474; United States

District information
- Type: Public Independent school district
- Grades: EE through 12
- Superintendent: Bryan Hallmark
- Schools: 4
- NCES District ID: 4839630

Students and staff
- Students: 3,002 (2023–2024)
- Teachers: 214.19 (on an FTE basis) (2023–2024)
- Staff: 177.97 (on an FTE basis) (2023–2024)
- Student–teacher ratio: 14.02 (2023–2024)

Other information
- Website: www.sealyisd.com

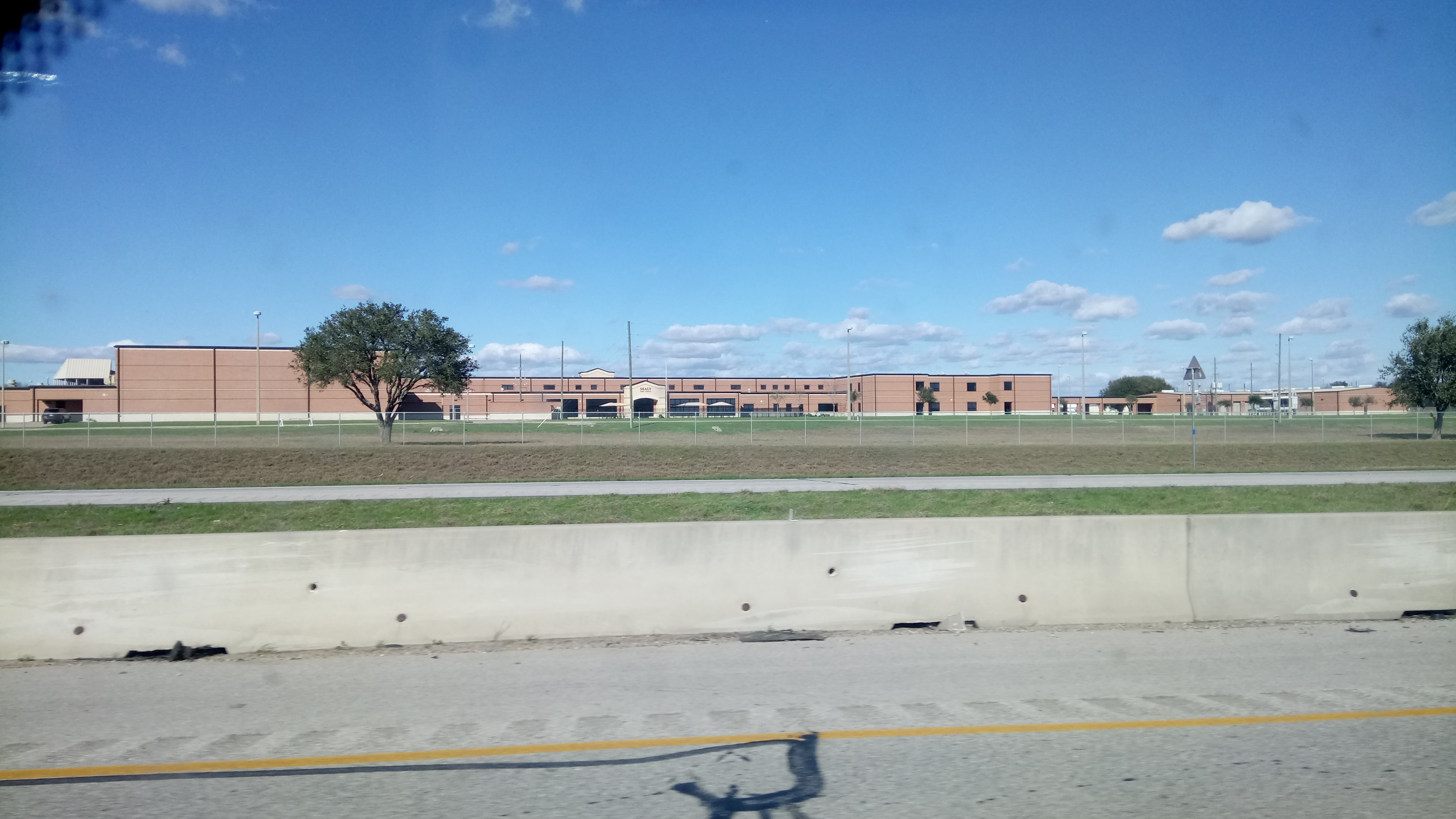
School building from road

Sealy Independent School District is a public school district based in Sealy, Texas (USA). In addition to Sealy, the district serves the towns of San Felipe and Brazos Country serving students in southern Austin County. Sealy Independent School District is the only school district in Austin county with its own police department.

In 2009, the school district was rated "academically acceptable" by the Texas Education Agency. On May 7, 2016, voters approved a $43,220,000 Sealy ISD bond package, with 67 percent in favor. This led to the opening of Sealy Elementary School a few years later.

== Schools ==
The district has students in four schools.

- Sealy High School (Grades 9-12)
- Sealy Junior High School (Grades 6-8)
- Sealy Elementary School (Grades EE-5)
- Selman Elementary School (Grades EE-5)
