= Sealy, Texas =

- City
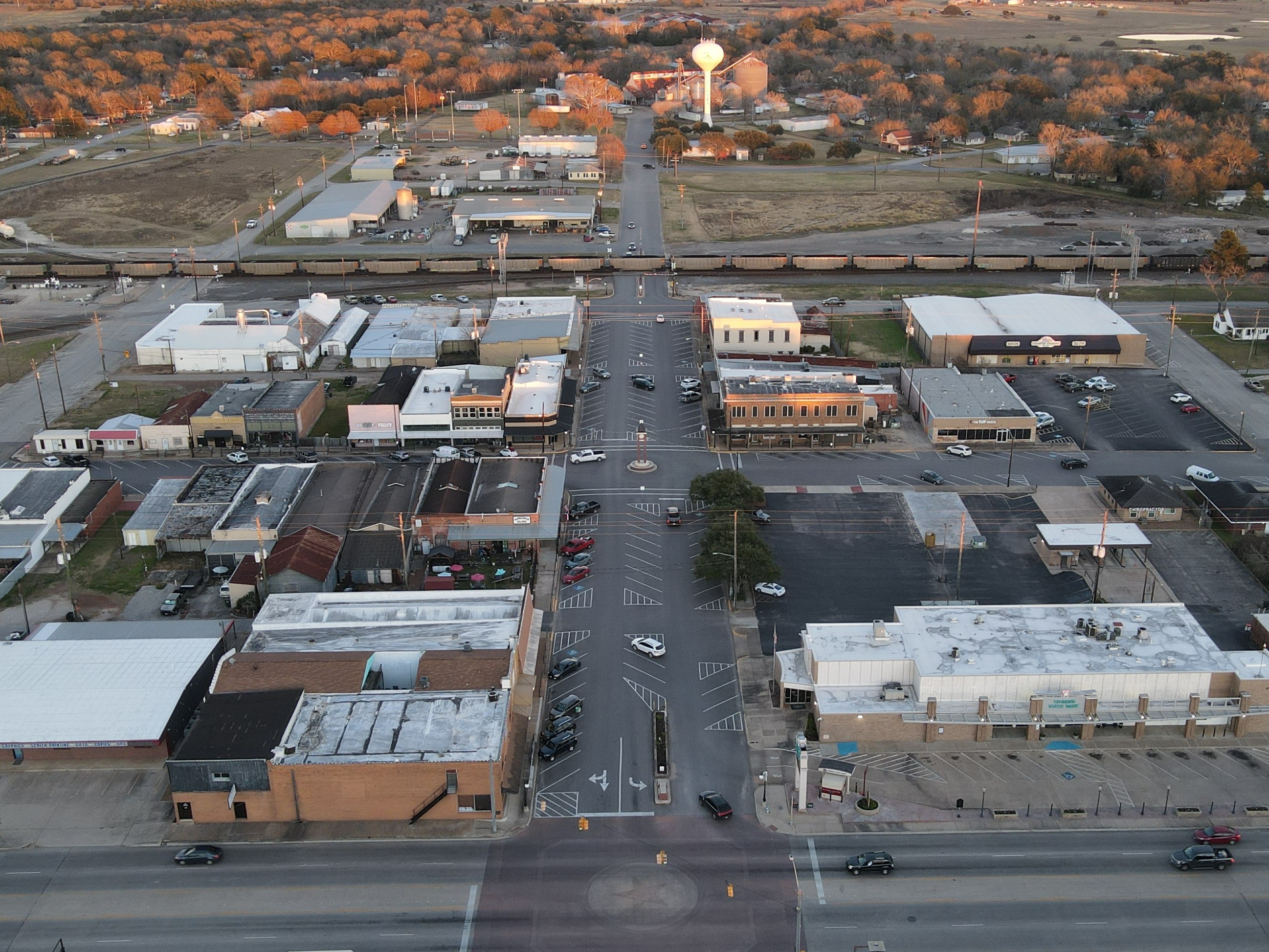
- Aerial view of downtown Sealy

- Seal
- Motto: A History of Excellence. A Future of Progress.
- Location of Sealy, Texas
- Coordinates: 29°46′27″N 96°9′27″W
- Country: United States
- State: Texas
- County: Austin

Government
  - Type: Council–manager
  - Mayor: Carolyn Bilski
  - State Representative: Stan Kitzman (R)
  - State Senator: Lois Kolkhorst (R)
  - U.S. House: Michael McCaul (R)

Area
  - Total: 11.71 sq mi (30.32 km^{2})
  - Land: 11.56 sq mi (29.95 km^{2})
  - Water: 0.14 sq mi (0.37 km^{2})
- Elevation: 200 ft (61 m)

Population (2020)
  - Total: 6,839
  - Density: 557.3/sq mi (215.19/km^{2})
- Time zone: UTC−6 (Central (CST))
  - Summer (DST): UTC−5 (CDT)
- ZIP code: 77474
- Area code: 979
- FIPS code: 48-66464
- GNIS feature ID: 1346849
- Website: www.ci.sealy.tx.us

Sealy is a city in Austin County in southeastern Texas, United States. The population was 6,839 at the 2020 census. Sealy is located 49 miles (79 km) west of the downtown Houston area, on the most eastern part of the Texas-German belt region, an area settled by German emigrants.

== History ==
San Felipe sold part of its original 22,000-acre (8,900 ha) township to the Gulf, Colorado and Santa Fe Railroad to create Sealy in 1879. Sealy derives its name from business tycoon and majority stock holder of the GCSF RR, George Sealy of Galveston. In 1881, Daniel Haynes, a cotton gin builder, filled a request for a cotton-filled mattress which started a company. He named this the Sealy Mattress Company after the town. Business grew exponentially, which led to more innovation and several patents, such as a machine that compressed cotton.

== Geography ==
According to the United States Census Bureau, the city has a total area of 15.5 square miles (40 km^{2}), of which 13.38 square miles (34.7 km^{2}) is land and 0.16 square miles (0.41 km^{2}) is water.

Sealy is 49 miles (79 km) west of Downtown Houston.

== Demographics ==
Historical population
| Census | Pop. | Note | %± |
|---|---|---|---|
| 1880 | 24 | | — |
| 1890 | 837 | | 3,387.5% |
| 1950 | 1,942 | | — |
| 1960 | 2,328 | | 19.9% |
| 1970 | 2,685 | | 15.3% |
| 1980 | 3,875 | | 44.3% |
| 1990 | 4,541 | | 17.2% |
| 2000 | 5,248 | | 15.6% |
| 2010 | 6,019 | | 14.7% |
| 2020 | 6,839 | | 13.6% |
U.S. Decennial Census

=== 2020 census ===
As of the 2020 census, Sealy had a population of 6,839; there were 2,529 households and 1,921 families residing in the city.

The median age was 36.9 years. 26.4% of residents were under the age of 18 and 16.3% of residents were 65 years of age or older. For every 100 females there were 96.9 males, and for every 100 females age 18 and over there were 92.8 males age 18 and over.

93.4% of residents lived in urban areas, while 6.6% lived in rural areas.

Of the 2,529 households, 35.3% had children under the age of 18 living in them. Of all households, 44.9% were married-couple households, 20.0% were households with a male householder and no spouse or partner present, and 30.1% were households with a female householder and no spouse or partner present. About 29.1% of all households were made up of individuals and 14.2% had someone living alone who was 65 years of age or older.

There were 2,834 housing units, of which 10.8% were vacant. The homeowner vacancy rate was 2.2% and the rental vacancy rate was 12.6%.

Racial composition as of the 2020 census
| Race | Number | Percent |
|---|---|---|
| White | 3,450 | 50.4% |
| Black or African American | 792 | 11.6% |
| American Indian and Alaska Native | 85 | 1.2% |
| Asian | 100 | 1.5% |
| Native Hawaiian and Other Pacific Islander | 2 | 0.0% |
| Some other race | 1,116 | 16.3% |
| Two or more races | 1,294 | 18.9% |
| Hispanic or Latino (of any race) | 2,813 | 41.1% |

=== 2000 census ===
As of the census of 2000, there were 5,248 people, 1,882 households, and 1,349 families residing in the city. The population density was 759.3 inhabitants per square mile (293.2/km^{2}). There were 2,077 housing units at an average density of 300.5 per square mile (116.0/km^{2}). The racial makeup of the city was 75.1% White, 12.3% African American, 0.30% Native American, 0.55% Asian, 12.88% from other races, and 1.92% from two or more races. Hispanic or Latino of any race were 30.43% of the population.

There were 1,882 households, out of which 38.4% had children under the age of 18 living with them, 52.6% were married couples living together, 13.7% had a female householder with no husband present, and 28.3% were non-families. 24.5% of all households were made up of individuals, and 11.7% had someone living alone who was 65 years of age or older. The average household size was 2.75 and the average family size was 3.30.

In the city, the population was spread out, with 30.2% under the age of 18, 9.3% from 18 to 24, 28.9% from 25 to 44, 19.2% from 45 to 64, and 12.5% who were 65 years of age or older. The median age was 33 years. For every 100 females, there were 91.3 males. For every 100 females age 18 and over, there were 87.8 males.

The median income for a household in the city was $34,277, and the median income for a family was $40,348. Males had a median income of $28,720 versus $20,793 for females. The per capita income for the city was $15,986. About 11.2% of families and 15.6% of the population were below the poverty line, including 18.9% of those under age 18 and 13.5% of those age 65 or over.

== Education ==
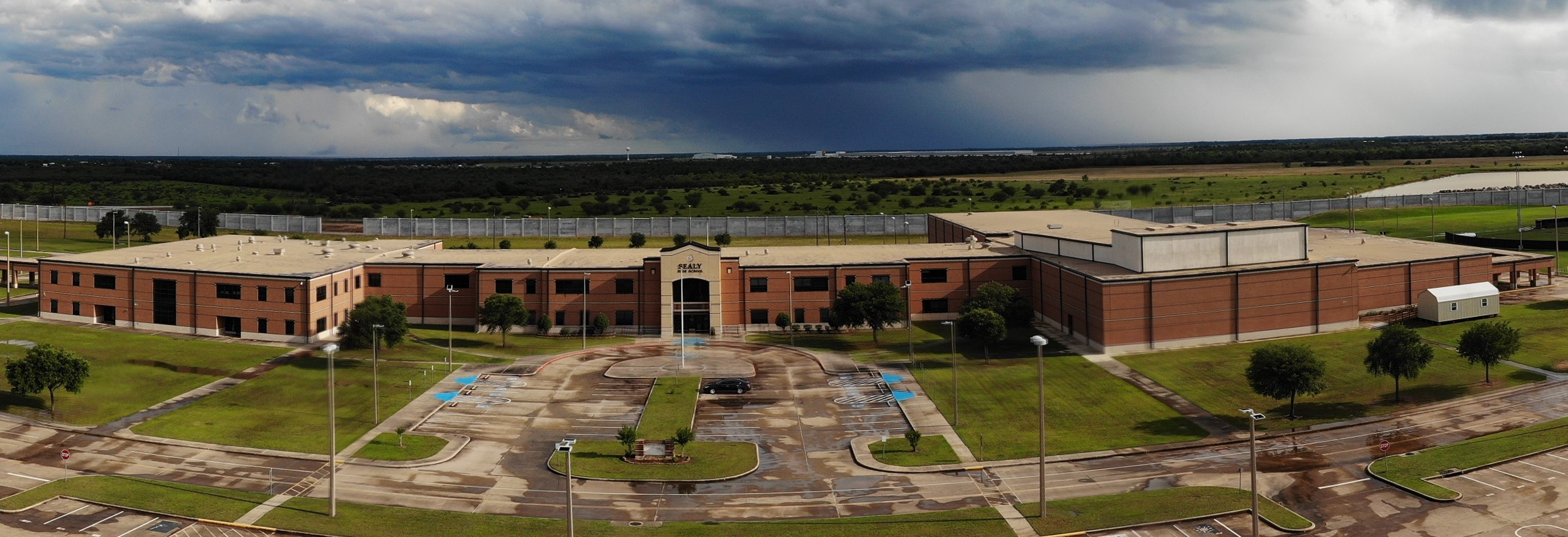
Sealy High School

People who live in Sealy are zoned to schools in Sealy Independent School District. The schools in Sealy ISD are Selman Elementary School or Sealy Elementary (pre-kindergarten to fifth grade), Sealy Junior High School (6–8), and Sealy High School (9–12). All of the schools are in Sealy. Blinn College has a Sealy Campus located along Interstate 10, east of State Highway 36.

== Infrastructure ==
=== Transportation ===
Sealy is served by Interstate 10, U.S. Highway 90, Texas State Highway 36, the BNSF Railway, and the Union Pacific Railroad. The Greyhound Bus Lines operates the Sealy Station at Mazac Muffler City AC.

== Notable people ==
- Eric Dickerson, Pro Football Hall of Fame running back
- Ernie Koy, Major League Baseball player
- Huey Long, singer with The Ink Spots
- Ricky Seals-Jones, NFL tight end
- George Sealy, Business man; origin of the city name
- Patrick Zurek, Roman Catholic bishop of the Diocese of Amarillo
