= Rakova =

Rakova, Raková or Ráková may refer to:

== People ==
- Edita Raková (born 1978), Slovak ice hockey player
- Ursula Rakova (born 1964/1965), Papua New Guinean environmentalist and climate change activist
- Viktória Ráková (born 1981), Slovak actress

== Places ==
- Raková (Rokycany District), a municipality and village in the Czech Republic
- Raková u Konice, a municipality and village in the Czech Republic
- Zádveřice-Raková, a municipality in the Czech Republic
- Rakova (Čačak), a village in Serbia
- Rakova Bara, a village in Serbia
- Raková, Čadca District, a municipality and village in Slovakia
- Rakova Steza, a village in Slovenia

== See also ==
- Marina Rakova Case
- Rakowa
