= National Register of Historic Places listings in Austin County, Texas =

Location of Austin County in Texas

This is a list of the National Register of Historic Places listings in Austin County, Texas.

This is intended to be a complete list of properties and districts listed on the National Register of Historic Places in Austin County, Texas. There are one district and nine individual properties listed on the National Register in the county. Four individually listed properties are also Recorded Texas Historic Landmarks.

This National Park Service list is complete through NPS recent listings posted March 21, 2025.

== Current listings ==
The publicly disclosed locations of National Register properties and districts may be seen in a mapping service provided.

	Name on the Register	Image	Date listed	Location	City or town	Description
1	Allens Creek Ossuary Site	Allens Creek Ossuary Site	March 21, 1975 (#75001946)	Address restricted	Wallis	41AU36, aka Earnest Witte Site
2	Austin County Courthouse	Austin County Courthouse	November 3, 2023 (#100009510)	1 East Main St. 29°57′01″N 96°15′27″W	Bellville	
3	Austin County Jail	Austin County Jail	November 12, 1980 (#80004074)	36 S. Bell St. 29°56′58″N 96°15′27″W	Bellville	Recorded Texas Historic Landmark
4	Bellville Turnverein	Bellville Turnverein	January 25, 2024 (#100009870)	966 East Main Street; 29°56′46″N 96°14′50″W	Bellville	
5	Church of the Guardian Angel	Church of the Guardian Angel	June 21, 1983 (#83003074)	5614 Demel St. 29°37′28″N 96°03′18″W	Wallis	Churches with Decorative Interior Painting TR
6	Old Masonic Hall	Old Masonic Hall	August 14, 1986 (#86001611)	15 N. Masonic St. 29°57′04″N 96°15′29″W	Bellville	
7	Roesler House		May 10, 1984 (#84001570)	W of Nelsonville on TX 159; 29°58′32″N 96°26′15″W	Nelsonville	Recorded Texas Historic Landmark
8	San Felipe de Austin Historic and Archeological District	San Felipe de Austin Historic and Archeological District	October 11, 2016 (#16000716)	15945 FM 1458; 29°48′25″N 96°05′52″W	San Felipe	State Historic Site
9	Wesley Brethren Church	Wesley Brethren Church	January 18, 1979 (#79002910)	S of Wesley; 30°03′55″N 96°29′53″W	Wesley	Recorded Texas Historic Landmark; Churches with Decorative Interior Painting TR
10	Witte-Schmid House	Witte-Schmid House	December 8, 1997 (#97001531)	Off Schoenau, near jct. with Eckermann; 30°00′07″N 96°33′38″W	Shelby	Recorded Texas Historic Landmark

== See also ==
- National Register of Historic Places listings in Texas
- Recorded Texas Historic Landmarks in Austin County
