= Statue of Alexander Hamilton (Chicago) =

Monumental statue in Lincoln Park, Chicago

Coordinates: 41°55′54″N 87°38′18″W

Alexander Hamilton statue
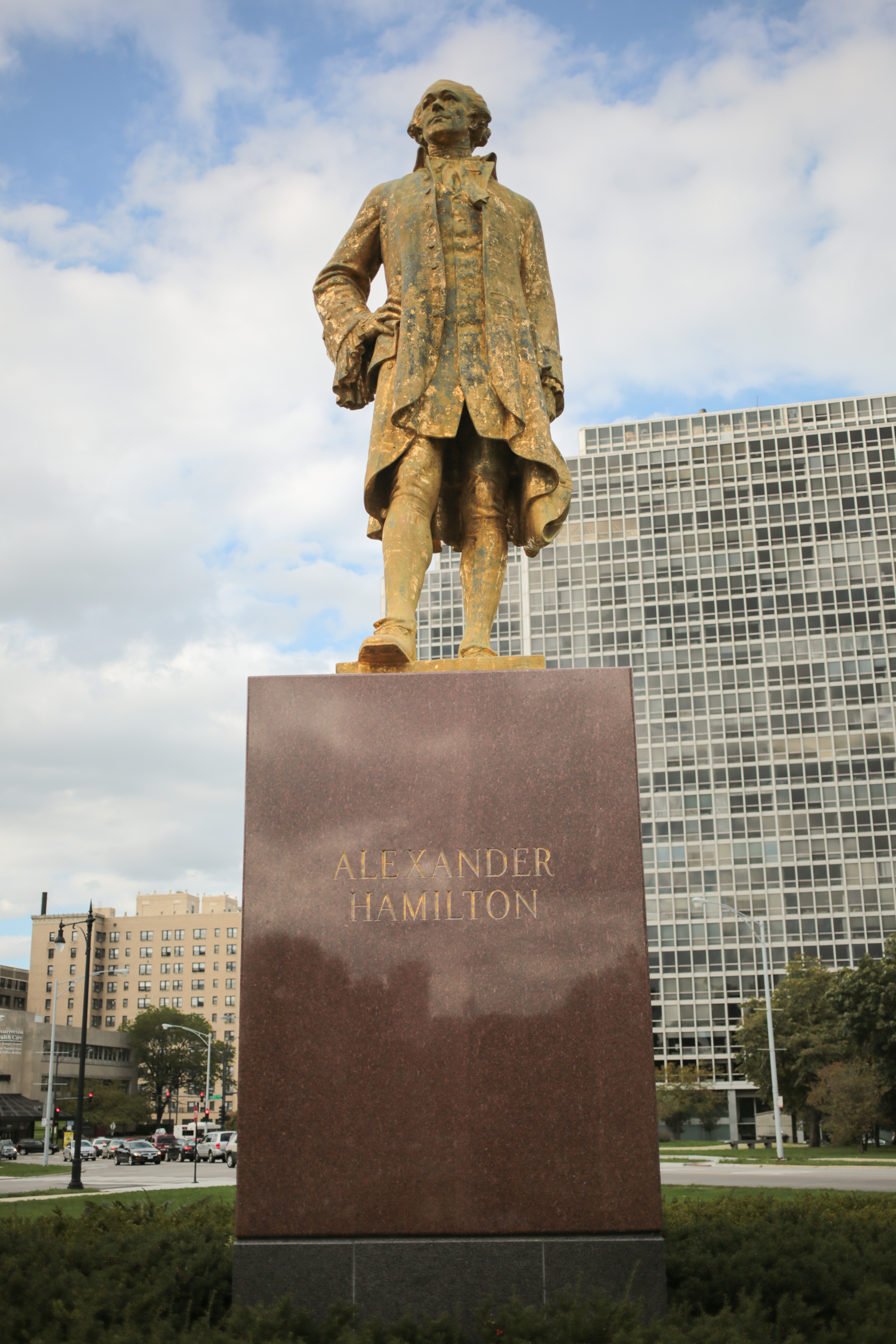
- Alexander Hamilton statue (2013)
- Interactive map of Alexander Hamilton statue
- Location: Lincoln Park, Chicago, Illinois, United States
- Designer: John Angel
- Material: Bronze (with gilding); Granite (pedestal)
- Height: 13 feet (4.0 m)
- Weight: 3,500 pounds (1,600 kg)
- Completion date: 1939
- Dedicated date: 1952
- Dedicated to: Alexander Hamilton

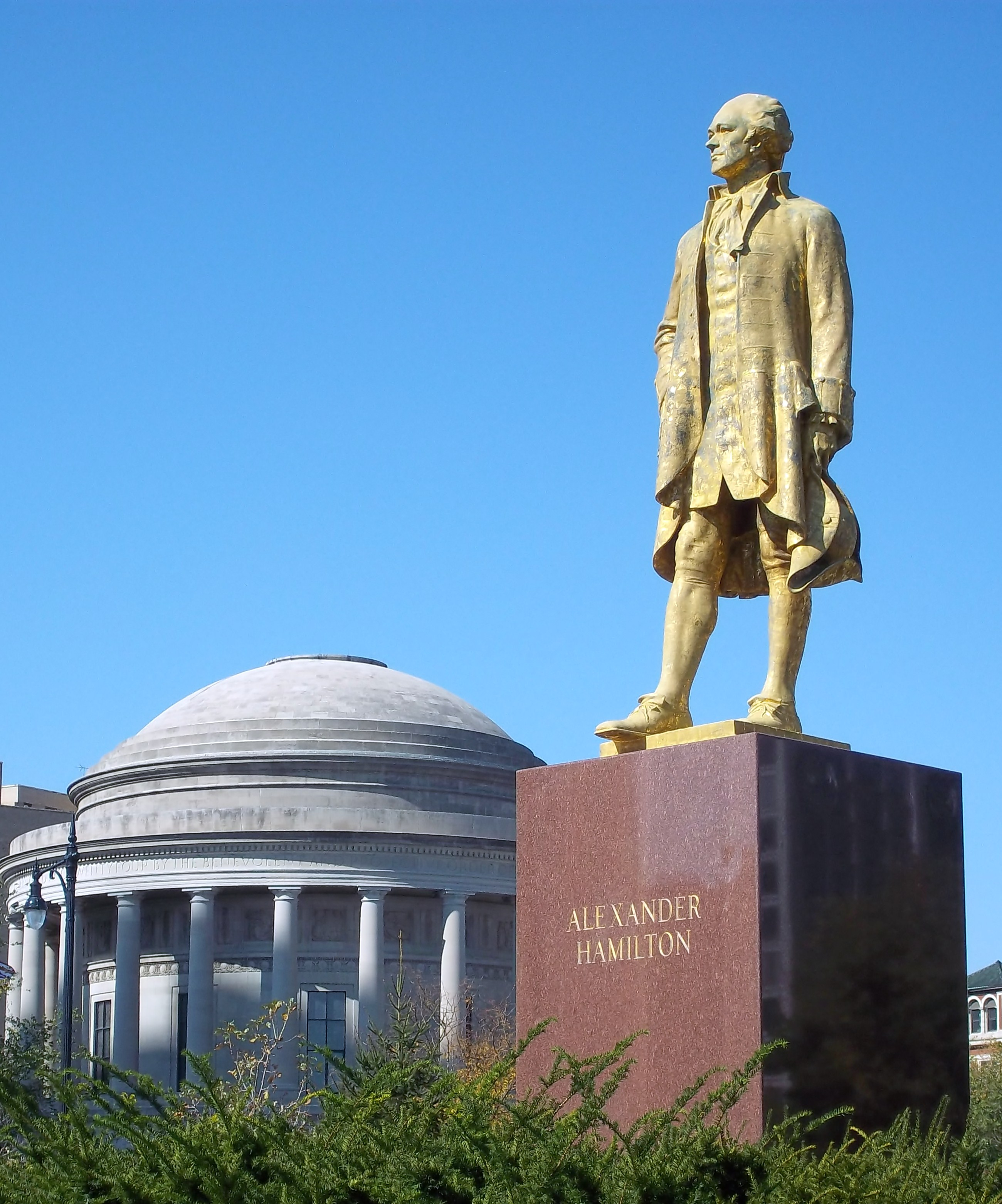
Alexander Hamilton

The Alexander Hamilton statue is a monumental statue of Alexander Hamilton in the Lincoln Park of Chicago, Illinois, United States. It was completed in 1939 and installed in 1952.

== History ==
The monument honoring Alexander Hamilton was proposed by philanthropist Kate Sturges Buckingham before her death in 1937. Her will included a US$1 million earmark to the Art Institute of Chicago for the monument's construction. Buckingham felt that Hamilton was an underappreciated figure in the creation of the United States, and before her death she commissioned sculptor John Angel to design a statue of Hamilton, and architect Eliel Saarinen to create an 80-foot (24 m) column that the statue would rest on. The statue was completed in 1939; the column was never made. The statue then remained in storage for over 12 years due to bronze shortages during World War II. The monument was dedicated in Lincoln Park in 1952, with a large limestone and granite plinth designed by Samuel A. Marx behind it; the plinth was removed in October 1993, and shortly thereafter the monument was placed on a new, red granite pedestal. In 2016, the statue underwent a $52,000 renovation that included extensive re-gilding.

== Design ==
The monument is 13 feet (4.0 m) high and weighs 3,500 pounds (1,600 kg).

== See also ==
- 1939 in art
