= Boccia (surname) =

Boccia is a surname. Notable people with the surname include:

- Edward Boccia (1921–2012), American painter and poet
- Ferdinand Boccia (1900–1934), American mobster
- Francesco Boccia (born 1968), Italian academic and politician
- Tanio Boccia (1912–1982), Italian film director and screenwriter
