= Wesley Brethren Church =

Historic church in Texas, United States

- U.S. National Register of Historic Places
- Recorded Texas Historic Landmark
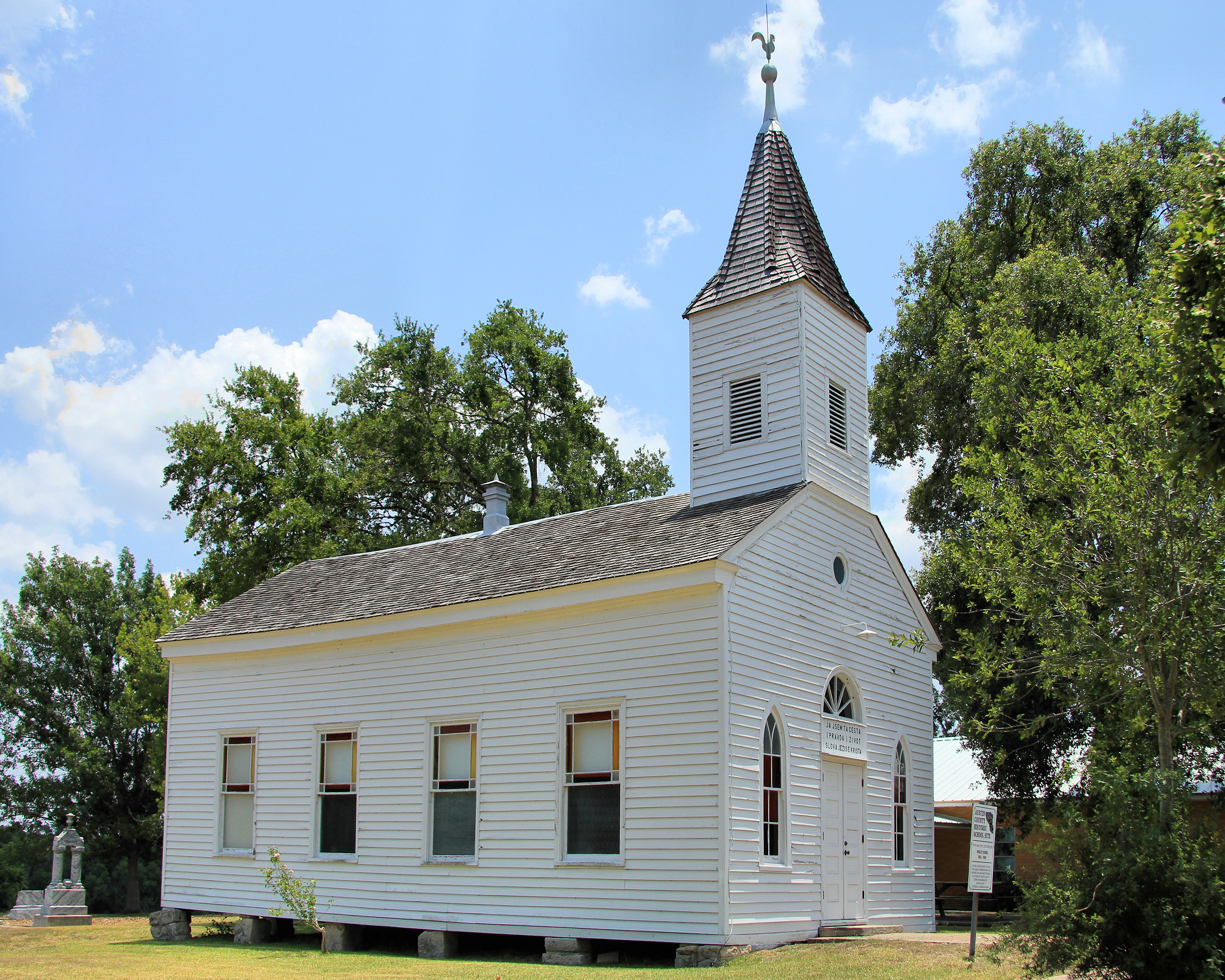
- Wesley Brethren Church in 2013

- Location within Texas Location within the United States
- Nearest city: Wesley, Texas
- Coordinates: 30°3′55″N 96°29′53″W
- Area: less than one acre
- Built: 1866
- MPS: Churches with Decorative Interior Painting TR
- NRHP reference No.: 79002910
- RTHL No.: 8405

Significant dates
- Added to NRHP: January 18, 1979
- Designated RTHL: 1966

Wesley Brethren Church is an historic church in Wesley, Texas, United States. The church was built in 1866. It was designated a Recorded Texas Historic Landmark in 1966 and added to the National Register of Historic Places in 1979.

The church is mostly built with hand cut native logs. Directly above the doors is a hand painted sign bearing the message: "JA JSEM TA CESTA I PRAVDA I ZIVOT SLOVA JEZISEKRISTA", meaning "I am the way, the truth, and the light, the words of Jesus Christ" in Czech. Inside the church, much of the wall and ceiling surface has elaborate and detailed hand painting, added between 1889 and 1891.

Rev. Josef Opocensky organized the first Czech Protestant and Moravian Brethren congregation in North America in 1864 at Veseli (now Wesley). The Wesley Brethren church, erected in 1886, served as a school between 1866 and 1900 and as a museum by 1989. Among his supporters and the first Czech and Moravian settlers in that part of Washington County, Texas and Austin County, Texas (Wesley and Latium) were former members of his congregation in Zádveřice in Moravia, and pioneers to Texas: Peter Mikeska, Jiri "George" Psencik, Josef Skrivanek, Mataus Rubac, Paul Sebesta, Tom Chupik (father of Johanna, wife of Rev. Ludvik Chlumsky), Frank Sebesta, Ernest Schuerer (married to Marie Opocensky, niece of Rev. J.O, Karl Rypl, Vinc Silar, Josef Rypl, Josef Silar, Jan Zabcik, Josef Jezek, Jan Baletka, Josef Masik. Rev. Josef Opocensky died July 17, 1870, and is buried in the cemetery adjacent to the church.

== See also ==
- National Register of Historic Places listings in Austin County, Texas
- Recorded Texas Historic Landmarks in Austin County
