= Old Masonic Lodge =

Old Masonic Lodge may refer to:

in the United States (by state)

- Old Masonic Hall (Benicia, California), listed on the NRHP in Solano County, California
- Old Seminary Building, also known as The Old Masonic Lodge, in Lawrenceville, Georgia, NRHP-listed
- Old Masonic Hall (Louisville, Mississippi), listed on the NRHP in Mississippi
- Old Masonic Hall (Bellville, Texas), NRHP-listed
