= Capital of Texas =

The capital of Texas usually refers to Austin, Texas, the capital of the present-day U.S. state. Several other locations served as the capital of Texas prior to statehood:

== Pre-Republic ==
- Monclova, first provincial capital of Texas, 1686, and again in 1833
- Los Adaes (modern day Robeline, Louisiana), 1721 to 1772
- San Antonio, 1772 to 1824
- San Felipe de Austin, now the San Felipe de Austin State Historic Site, headquarters of the Colony of Texas

== Republic of Texas ==
- Washington-on-the-Brazos, Texas, March 1, 1836 to March 17, 1836
- Harrisburg, Texas, March 21 to April 1836
- Velasco, Texas, April 1836 to September 1836
- Columbia, Texas, October 1836, first capital of the elected government of the Republic of Texas
- Houston, Texas, 1837 to 1839

== Modern-day Texas ==
- Austin, Texas, designated in 1839
