= Church of the Guardian Angel =

- U.S. National Register of Historic Places
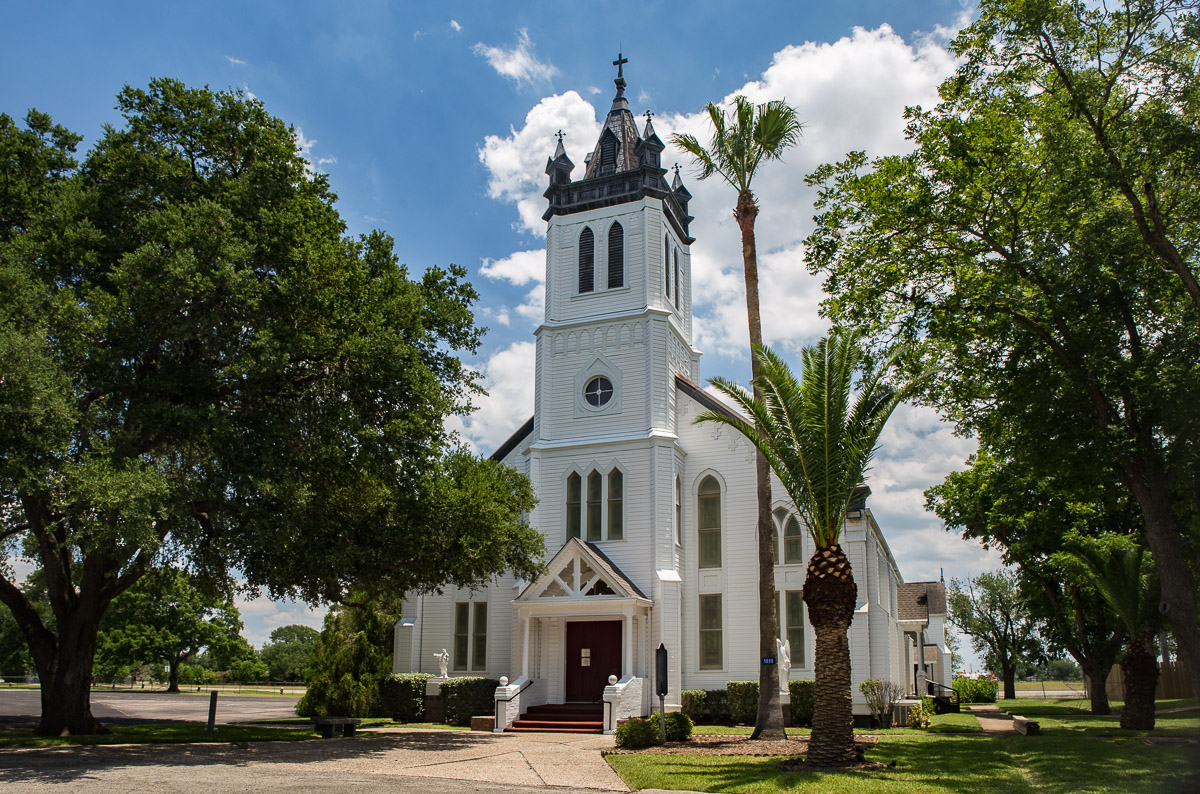
- Church of the Guardian Angel in 2020

- Location within Texas Location within the United States
- Location: 5614 Demel St., Wallis, Texas
- Coordinates: 29°37′32″N 96°3′25″W
- Area: less than one acre
- Built: 1913
- Built by: Mr. Bunch
- Architect: Leo Dielman
- Architectural style: Gothic Revival
- MPS: Churches with Decorative Interior Painting TR
- NRHP reference No.: 83003074
- Added to NRHP: June 21, 1983

Church of the Guardian Angel is a historic Roman Catholic church at 5614 Demel Street in Wallis, Texas.

It was built in 1913 and added to the National Register of Historic Places in 1983.

== See also ==
- National Register of Historic Places listings in Austin County, Texas
