= Bleiblerville, Texas =

Bleiblerville
- Unincorporated community
- Location within the state of Texas Bleiblerville (the United States)
- Coordinates: 30°0′29″N 96°26′51″W
- Country: United States
- State: Texas
- County: Austin
- Elevation: 371 ft (113 m)
- Time zone: UTC-6 (Central (CST))
  - Summer (DST): UTC-5 (CDT)
- ZIP codes: 78931
- GNIS feature ID: 1330860

Bleiblerville is an unincorporated community in northern Austin County, Texas, United States. According to the Handbook of Texas, its population was 71 in 2000. It is located within the Greater Houston metropolitan area.

== History ==
Bleiblerville was named for Robert Bleibler, a Swiss immigrant, who ran the general store, post office, and saloon. The community grew rapidly with the influx of many German immigrants in the late nineteenth century, and its post office was established in 1891. The town had a population of 101 in 1904, and expanded to 150 by 1925. The community expanded in the 1960s with the increase of oil drilling in the community, growing to 225 residents in 1966, but declined to 71 in 1972 where it remained up to 2000.

Although Bleiblerville is unincorporated, it has a post office, with the ZIP code of 78931.

== Geography ==
Bleiblerville is situated on FM 2502 a distance of 3.4 miles (5.5 km) northwest of its intersection with State Highway 159 at Nelsonville and 12.1 miles (19.5 km) northwest of Bellville. From Bleiblerville northwest to the intersection of FM 2502 and Farm to Market Road 109 near Welcome is 2.9 miles (4.7 km). From the center of Bleiblerville, Industry Road snakes its way to the southwest a distance of 3.8 miles (6.1 km) to Industry. Bleiblerville Road leaves the community heading northeast and connects with New Wehdem Road to cover the 8.9 miles (14.3 km) to an intersection with State Highway 36 south of Brenham. Bleiblerville addresses extend northwest along FM 2502 as far as the FM 109 intersections, but only a short distance to the southeast. The Bleiblerville postal zone extends as far as Industry Road and Begonia Lane to the southwest and Bleiblerville and West Uekert Roads to the northeast.

== Education ==
The school in nearby Welcome is located a mile north of Bleiblerville on Farm to Market Road 2502. Today, the community is served by the Bellville Independent School District.
