= Welcome, Texas =

Welcome
- Unincorporated community
- Location within the state of Texas Welcome (the United States)
- Coordinates: 30°1′40″N 96°29′21″W
- Country: United States
- State: Texas
- County: Austin
- Elevation: 333 ft (101 m)
- Time zone: UTC-6 (Central (CST))
  - Summer (DST): UTC-5 (CDT)
- ZIP codes: 78944

Welcome is an unincorporated community in northwestern Austin County, Texas, United States. According to the Handbook of Texas, the community had a population of 150 in 2000. It is located within the Greater Houston metropolitan area.

== History ==
The land along Pecan Creek was settled by Anglo-Americans as early as the late 1820s. By 1852, German immigrants moved into the area. A leading member of the German community was schoolmaster J. F. Schmidt from Oldenburg, who later formed a singing club. Liking the pleasant countryside and friendly people, Schmidt named the town Welcome. In 1871, a post office opened in the settlement. By 1936, there were approximately 200 persons in the community with four commercial establishments. The population dwindled to about 60 souls with two businesses in 1950. The town recovered so that there were 175 inhabitants in 1965. From 1990 to 2000, the population was around 150 persons.

== Geography ==
Welcome is on FM 109 4.2 miles (6.8 km) north of Industry and 0.8 miles (1.3 km) south of Farm to Market Road 2502. At the intersection with Thielemann Road at Welcome, FM 109 turns from a northerly to a northeasterly direction. Thielemann Road goes northwest and connects with Speiss, Turnbow, Garlin and Zetter Roads. The Welcome Lutheran Church is on FM 109 about 0.3 miles (0.5 km) northeast of FM 2502. The addresses in Welcome all carry the 78944 zip code, the same as Industry. Bleiblerville is to the southeast on FM 2502. It is also located 9 mi (14 km) southwest of Brenham.

== Education ==
J F Schmidt established the first school in the community on the west banks of Pecan Creek. Welcome is served by the Bellville Independent School District.
