= Stephen F. Austin State Park =

State park in Texas, United States

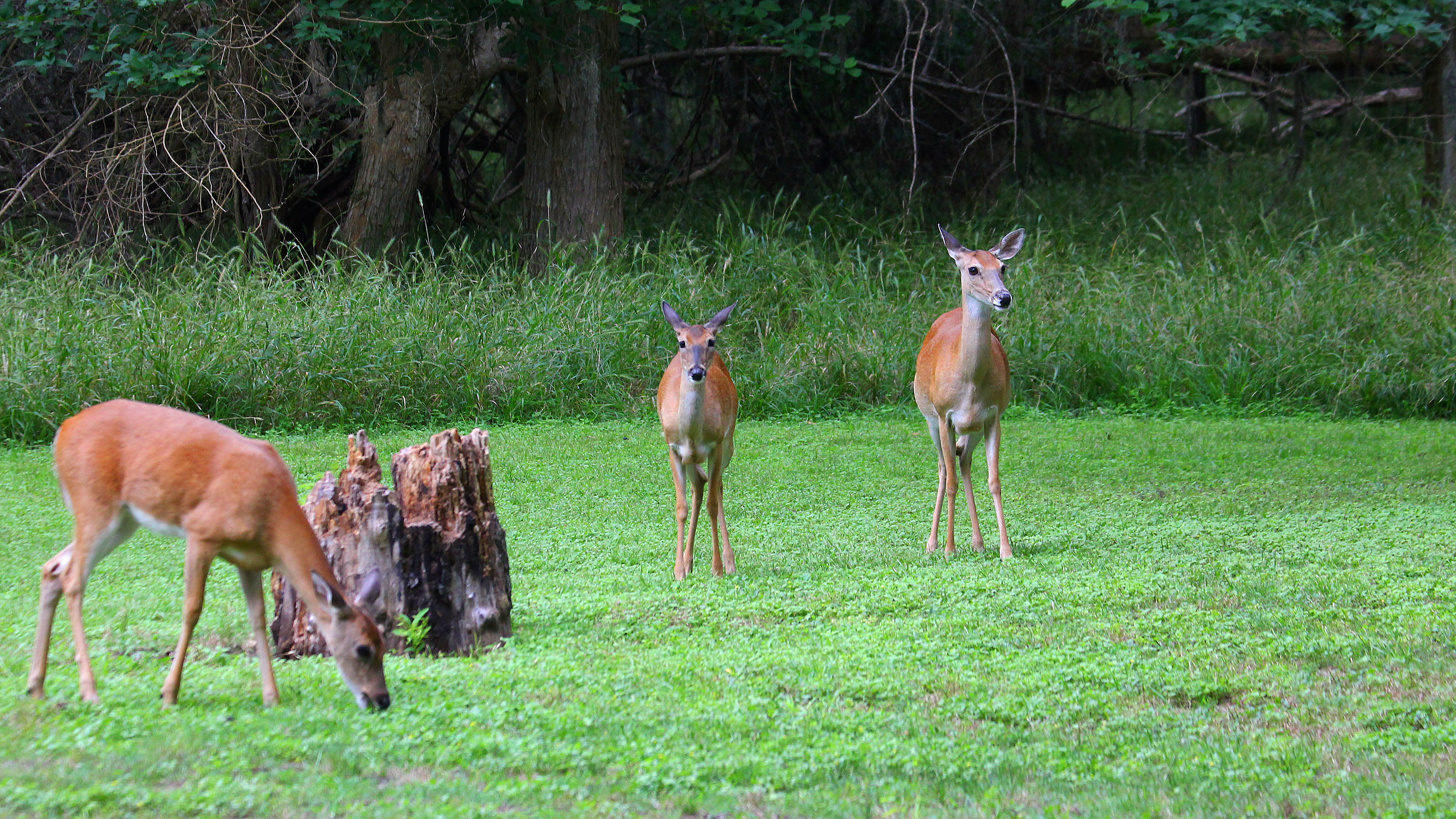
- White-tailed deer in the park

- Location within Texas Location within the United States
- Location: Austin County, Texas
- Nearest city: San Felipe
- Coordinates: 29.811982°N 96.108059°W
- Area: 663.3 acres (268.4 ha)
- Established: 1940
- Named for: Stephen F. Austin
- Visitors: 78,974 (in 2025)
- Governing body: Texas Parks and Wildlife Department
- Website: Official site

Stephen F. Austin State Park is a 663.3 acres (268 ha) state park located on the Brazos River in San Felipe, Austin County, Texas, United States. The park opened in 1940 and is managed by the Texas Parks and Wildlife Department.

== History ==
The land that makes up the site was deeded to the state by the San Felipe de Austin Corporation in 1940, and the park was opened to the public the same year.

12 acres (4.9 ha) of the park are set aside as the San Felipe de Austin State Historic Site to honor the area's past. This was the site of the township of San Felipe, the seat of government of the Anglo-American colonies in Texas starting in 1823. It was here Stephen F. Austin, brought the first 297 families to colonize Texas under a contract with the Mexican Government. The town was burned on March 2, 1836, to prevent it from falling into the hands of the advancing Mexican Army during the Texas Revolution. On January 1, 2008, the San Felipe State Historic Site was transferred from the Texas Parks and Wildlife Department to the Texas Historical Commission.

== Nature ==
=== Animals ===
The park is a productive birdwatching location with observations of pileated woodpecker, barred owl, white-eyed vireo, Mississippi kite, northern parula and various warblers. White-tailed deer abound in the park. Other mammals include common raccoon, Virginia opossum, Mexican long-nosed armadillo, swamp rabbit, eastern fox squirrel and bobcat.

=== Plants ===
Habitat is typical East Texas riparian, upland areas are mostly pecan, sugar hackberry, cedar elm, Osage-orange, and western soapberry while common trees in the river bottom areas are eastern cottonwood, American sycamore, green ash, box elder and roughleaf dogwood. The understory includes coralberry, dwarf palmetto, possumhaw, yaupon holly, mustang grape, Turk's cap and river oats.

== Activities ==
The park offers camping, a picnic area and hiking trails. A public golf course is adjacent to the park.

== See also ==
- List of Texas state parks
- List of Texas state historic sites
