= Morton D. May =

American philanthropist and art collector (1914–1983)

- Born: March 25, 1914; St. Louis, Missouri, US
- Died: April 13, 1983 (aged 69); St. Louis, Missouri, US
- Occupation: Businessman
- Known for: CEO of May Company
- Spouse: Lucia Piaskowiak
- Children: David A. May; Philip F. May; Morton J. May II
- Parent(s): Florence Goldman May; Morton J. May
- Family: David May (grandfather)

Morton David May (25 March 1914 – 13 April 1983) (known as Buster to his friends and colleagues) was an American philanthropist and art collector. He was also at various times director, chairman of the board, and chief executive officer of the May Department Stores Company.

== Biography ==
May was born to a Jewish family, the son of Sarah (née Hirsch) and Morton J. May. He was the grandson of David May, who started the family in merchandising from a canvas-roofed makeshift shop, in the then-populous city of Leadville, Colorado, during a gold strike in 1877. He soon came to the conclusion that there was no future there, and moved his business to Denver, Colorado. The whole May family would move out to St. Louis, Missouri in 1905. He opened a store there and later bought out the William Barr Dry Goods Co., merging it with the Famous Shoe & Clothing Co. — and Famous-Barr was created. Morton J. May, David May's son, took over the family enterprise, and ran it successfully for many years during Morton D. May's childhood. Morton D. May attended St. Louis's Country Day school, and then Dartmouth College.

=== Career ===
Despite his privileged position as heir to May Department Stores fortune, May started out his career with a summer position in the complaints department. After that he held nearly every position from janitor to chairman of the board. In 1951 he was elected president of the corporation, a position which he held until 1967. Then he was chairman of the board until 1972. He was also chief executive officer from 1957 to 1968. He retired from the corporation's board of directors in 1982 and was elected director emeritus.

=== Art collection ===
May became interested in collecting art through his uncle by marriage Samuel Abraham Marx in the early 1940s but was interrupted by World War II. When the war was over he traveled to galleries in New York and began investigating the paintings of American artists and Cubists, but soon his interests drifted elsewhere. He was well known for not being a fashionable collector. When his contemporaries were buying School of Paris pictures, May was buying tough German Expressionist pictures that turned out to be masterpieces.

So much of what makes art collectable, other than the artist's ability is fashion and promotion. Art museum curators are a thing unto themselves. If an artist is out of the grouping of what they (curators) think is good, they won't go along. Fashion in art has been set for the past twenty-five years by the Metropolitan Museum in New York City.

— Morton D. May, South Side Journal

In general May focused his collection in three areas, German Expressionism, Mesoamerica, and the indigenous arts of various cultures around the globe, including primarily art from Oceania, Africa, and other Pre-Columbian art that was not specifically from Mesoamerica. In these areas his goal was comprehensiveness. Because he bought so extensively, he sometimes made mistakes, which he famously laughed off, making no effort to conceal them. He even displayed them in his office in the Railway Exchange Building along with his fishing trophies and family photographs. He was introduced to art by his parents when he was in his early teens. They traveled to Europe and toured various museums, trips which he later characterized as 'forced marches'. He did not learn to appreciate art until he was at Dartmouth where he took a course in modern art and architecture. In the 1930s May visited the home in Chicago of the architect Samuel Marx, to whom his aunt was married, and from whom he would later commission a house. When interviewed in 1980, he spoke of the visit:

I was there discussing the plans (for the house), They (the Marxes) owned wonderful art, including a magnificent collection of the work of the School of Paris artists. But what really stunned me was not the French art but some Mexican figures I learned were from the west coast of Mexico, between 1,600 and 1,900 years old. I knew then and there that I wanted to own similar objects.

— Morton D. May, St. Louis Post-Dispatch

He bought some Pre-Columbian artwork immediately following the war, but mostly between 1945 and the mid-1950s he gave his attention to acquiring German Expressionist works, a movement which were virtually unknown in the United States at the time. In 1948 May asked his friend, the painter Maurice Freedman, if he knew of any artists who were doing good work but weren't very well known. Freedman mentioned Max Beckmann to May, and soon May bought his first Beckmann from dealer Curt Valentin in New York. Then he discovered that Beckmann was teaching art at the nearby Washington University in St. Louis. "Imagine my surprise, here he was a quarter of a mile away." During Beckmann's time in St. Louis, he and May became friends. May, who was painting at the time hired Beckmann to be his tutor. May also commissioned a portrait from him in 1949. Over the years May purchased so many of Beckmann's works that his collection was one of the two major collections in the United States. (The other belonging to Dr. Stephan Lackner of Santa Barbara, California) May also collected works of other German Expressionist Masters of both Die Bruecke and Der Blaue Reiter movements, and works by independents. Some of these include Karl Schmidt-Rottluff, Ernst Ludwig Kirchner, Lovis Corinth, Wassily Kandinsky, Franz Marc, Erich Heckel and Oskar Kokoschka. In the 1950s, when prices for German Expressionist paintings began to rise, May directed his attention to the expansion of his other collection, the works of art that he had liked so much in the Marx's apartment. He regarded his "primitive" collection as an extension of his interest in Expressionist art. He found in both areas vitality and enormous expressiveness. May also avidly collected the contemporary work of the Italian American artist Edward E. Boccia of St. Louis, visiting the young artist's studio yearly and purchasing multiple works from the mid 1950's through 1983. In 1960 May visited the Carlebach gallery in New York. He detailed his experience in an introduction to a catalogue for a show of his collection at the Saint Louis Art Museum.

I happened to visit the Carleback Gallery in New York and found it full of beautifully carved objects, which were strong, expressive, and aesthetically satisfying. It was as though a whole new world of art had opened to me, and I became convinced that art from the Melanesian islands was of the highest quality and should be ranked with that of the other great art producing areas of the world.

During that time period, there wasn't much of a market for Melanesian Art, so what he considered to be authentic ritual pieces (pieces from before European contact) were available at low prices. He also was a patron of unrecognized artists in St. Louis and elsewhere. He was the first to promote the artist Ernest Trova. Trova had worked as a May Department Stores window designer. May gave Trova space in May's own studio to develop his abilities and talents. Later he sponsored an exhibit of Trova's works. May was also a great collector of the artist and professor of Sam Fox School of Design & Visual Arts Edward E. Boccia whose studio he would visit annually from and purchase work.

Over the course of his life May gifted around three thousand art objects to the Saint Louis Art Museum, including 20th-century paintings and sculptures, a large number of German Expressionist drawings, ritual objects from around the world, and Russian textiles. The majority of these however, were pre-Columbian objects. When the museum's new pre-Columbian galleries opened in 1980 they included roughly three thousand objects, 86% of which were donated by May. During his lifetime, much of the rest of his collection was on loan to various museums around the world, but mostly to the Saint Louis Art Museum, and the Washington University Gallery of Art, now called the Mildred Lane Kemper Art Museum. He also bought art with the Saint Louis Art Museum in mind, with the intention of rounding out its collection. Upon his death he gave the Saint Louis Art Museum and the Washington University Gallery of Art all of the art on loan to them at the time of his death. In addition, works of art on loan to other museums were bequeathed to the Saint Louis Art Museum. Photographs were the only exclusion.

Papers documenting the art collection of Morton D. May are housed in the archives of the Saint Louis Art Museum. One can view a description of the contents at this link. They are available to researchers by appointment.

=== Photography ===
In 1934, during his studies at Dartmouth, he had a rare opportunity to travel to Russia with the free-lance photographer, Julien Bryan. The next year, he made a six-month trip through Russia, Manchuria, and Japan, as Bryan's assistant, filming for The March of Time series Today eight of his photographs are in the Metropolitan Museum of Art in New York, and many are in the collection of the Saint Louis Art Museum.

=== Other philanthropy ===
When May returned from the service, he found the ten-year-old plans for the Gateway Arch National Park languishing. He joined the effort for the riverfront memorial, and in 1959 was made president of what was then known as the Jefferson National Expansion Memorial Association. He was instrumental in the construction of the Gateway Arch. May headed fund drives for the Pius XII memorial Library at St. Louis University, and the development of a new Jewish Community Centers Association campus in St. Louis County. He was on the board of trustees of Washington University in St. Louis, the boards of the United Fund, the Regional Commerce and Growth Association, and Civic Progress Inc. He was commissioner for the Art Museum and a member of Friends of Laumeier Sculpture Park. He was chairman of the board of the St. Louis Symphony for eight years. He used his influence at the National Park Service, (the director and he were old fishing buddies, his friendship with the man had also been instrumental in getting the Arch completed) to get funding for the symphony to play at the Arch. His dedication to music in St. Louis did not end with the symphony. He also saved the Dance Concert Society from bankruptcy. In the early 1960s, May organized the Arts and Education Council in St. Louis because the United Way decided to stop funding cultural organizations to concentrate on health and welfare agencies. The Boy Scouts of America were always important to him. He was instrumental in the acquisition and development of the St. Louis Council's Beaumont Reservation near Eureka, Missouri and the S-F Scout Ranch near Knob Lick, MO. He was also a member of the Boy Scout National Executive Board.

=== Awards and honors ===
President Richard Nixon offered him the chairmanship of the National Council on the Arts, an advisory committee to the National Endowment for the Arts. He turned it down so that he could stay in St. Louis. He was awarded the Levee Stone for his efforts on behalf of downtown Saint Louis, and Washington University's William Greenleaf Eliot Society Award. For his work on behalf of the Boy Scouts, he was given two of their top awards, the Silver Antelope Award and the Silver Beaver. He was also given honorary degrees at Webster University, University of Missouri–St. Louis, and Drury University. In 1959, the St. Louis Globe-Democrat unanimously chose him as Man of the Year.

== Personal life ==
He was married to Margie May; they had three sons. In 1982, he married Lucia Piaskowiak, with whom he had one daughter.
