= Wilbur D. May Center =

Museum and garden in Reno, Nevada, US

Coordinates: 39.5462°N 119.8253°W

The Wilbur D. May Center is an attraction located in Rancho San Rafael Regional Park at 1595 North Sierra, Reno, Nevada. The facility comprises the Wilbur D. May Museum and the Wilbur D. May Arboretum and Botanical Garden. Previously, it also included the Great Basin Adventure, a children's park.

== Wilbur D. May Museum ==
The museum features the antiques and collectibles belonging to Wilbur D. May. Born on December 28, 1898, Wilbur May was the third son of David May, founder of The May Department Stores Company. Wilbur was a rancher, pilot, artist, philanthropist, and world traveler who lived in Reno from 1936 to his death on January 20, 1982. The museum's collection derives from over 40 trips Wilbur made around the world, and include Tang dynasty pottery, African masks, statues, and artwork, Inuit scrimshaws, Egyptian scarab figures, Greek icons, wildlife dioramas and a shrunken head from South America. Also featured is a recreation of the living room, bedroom, tack room, and big game trophy room from Wilbur's 2,600-acre (1,100 ha) Double Diamond Ranch in South Reno.

In addition to the museum's permanent collection, it also hosts traveling exhibits throughout the year on a variety of subjects. Previous exhibits have included "Predators," "Sherlock Holmes," and "Toytopia." The museum also includes an art gallery with rotating shows from local and regional artists, and a museum store featuring many fair-trade items from around the world. There is an admission fee for the museum, which is operated by the Washoe County Regional Parks and Open Space.

== Wilbur D. May Arboretum and Botanical Garden ==
The Wilbur D. May Arboretum and Botanical Garden covers 13 acres (5.3 ha) is an arboretum and botanical garden that is open to the public year-round without charge from sunrise to sunset. The site is located at an elevation of 4,600 feet (1,400 m) in a transitional zone between the Sierra Nevada and the Great Basin Desert. It receives an average annual precipitation of 7 inches (180 mm), daily temperature varies 50 °F (10 °C) or more, and the growing season is less than 100 days. The Arboretum is a member of the American Public Garden Association and certified as a Level II Arboretum. It is maintained by two full time horticulturists and the May Arboretum Society, a non-profit volunteer-run group.

The garden's primary purpose is to demonstrate gardening in the high desert environment. It includes the following areas:

- Burke Garden - modeled upon an English country garden, with elm trees and perennials in bloom from early May through September, including iris, bleeding heart, delphinium, foxglove, lupine, and campanula.
- Dixie's Plaza Garden - contains perennials and annuals.
- Honey's Garden - contains yellow and white flowering shrubs and roses, with waterfall and pools.
- Songbird Garden - contains aromatic flowers, seeds, and fruits, attracting many native birds.
- Evans Creek flows through the middle of the site. It originates from snowmelt and springs on Peavine Mountain, and flows onward to the Truckee River and then to Pyramid Lake.
