= John Lawrence Angel =

British-American biological anthropologist (1915–1986)

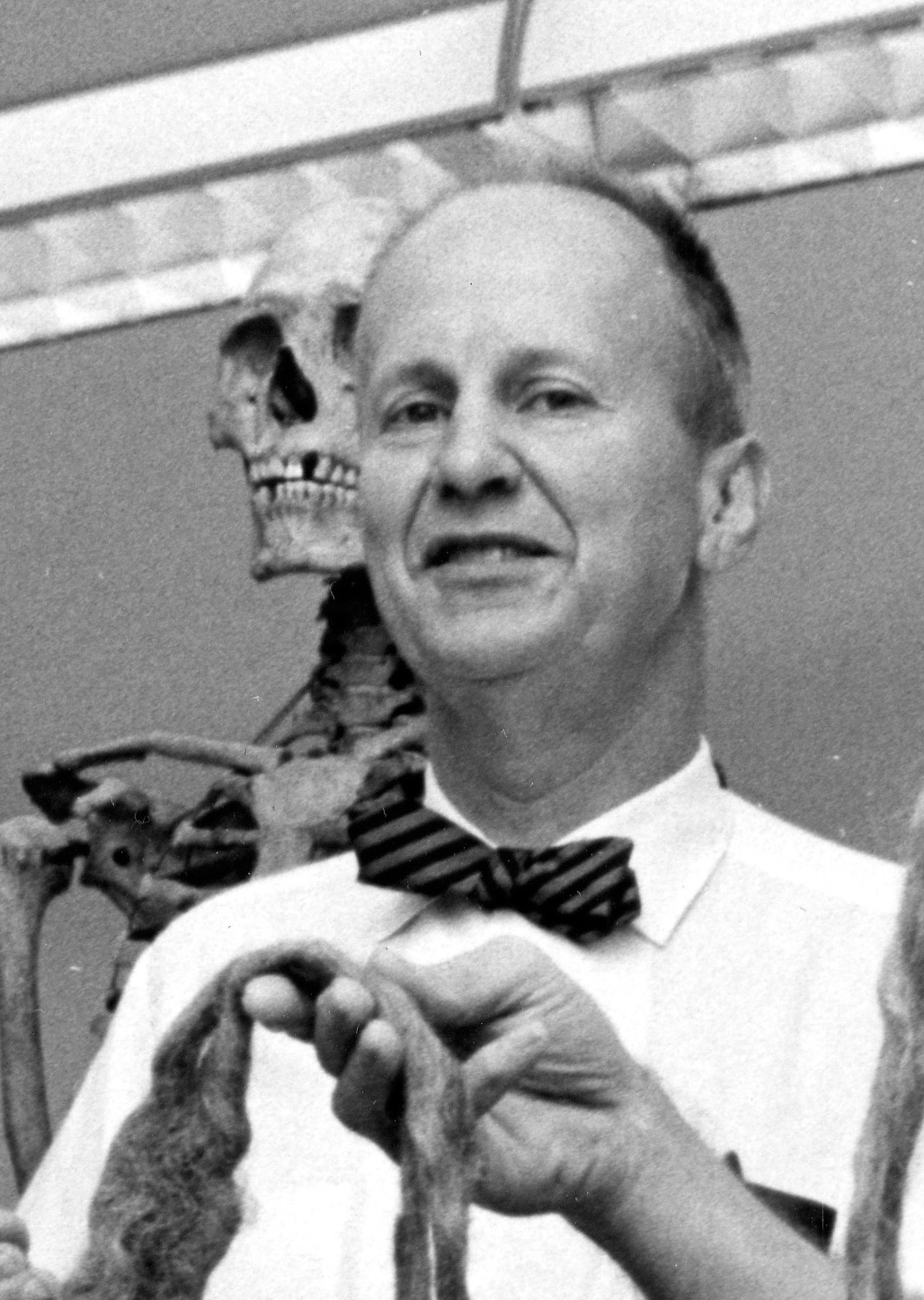
- Angel in 1967
- Born: March 21, 1915; London, United Kingdom
- Died: November 3, 1986 (aged 71); Washington, D.C., United States

Academic background
- Education: Harvard University

John Lawrence Angel (March 21, 1915 – November 3, 1986) was a British-American biological anthropologist. His writings have had the biggest impact on paleodemography.

== Education ==
His mother, Elizabeth, was an American classicist, and his father, John, was a British sculptor. The family emigrated to the United States in 1928. Angel completed his undergraduate degree at Harvard College in 1936 where he studied under Clyde Kluckhohn, Carleton S. Coon and Earnest A. Hooton. Hooton had a particular influence on Angel and arranged for him to conduct field work in Greece early in his career as a graduate student. While in Greece he collected data on archaeological human remains from various sites. These data became the basis of his dissertation and he received his Ph.D. degree from Harvard in 1942.

== Career ==
After completing his degree he taught briefly at the University of Minnesota and the University of California at Berkeley. In 1943 he accepted a post in the anatomy department of Jefferson Medical College in Philadelphia, Pennsylvania, where he taught and conducted research until his appointment in 1962 as Curator of Physical (Biological) Anthropology at the National Museum of Natural History, Smithsonian Institution.

During his career at the Smithsonian he broadened his research emphasis to include forensic anthropology. He was a consultant to the Federal Bureau of Investigation but also assisted many regional police units in identifying human remains from forensic cases. Angel had a major influence on research in biological anthropology in emphasizing the importance of combining cultural and biological data in interpreting human skeletal samples from past human groups. He worked closely with archaeologists in his effort to reconstruct what he called the social biology of archaeological human populations. Although Greece remained the focus of much of his research throughout his life he extended this focus to include archaeological human remains from Turkey. His research on human skeletal paleopathology laid the groundwork for much of the research being conducted in that field of research today.

== Death ==
Angel contracted hepatitis after undergoing coronary bypass surgery in 1982 and died of that disease in 1986. Throughout his declining health he remained active and completed work on a forensic case shortly before his death.
