= San Felipe de Austin State Historic Site =

- San Felipe de Austin Historic and Archeological District
- U.S. National Register of Historic Places
- U.S. Historic district
- Texas State Historic Site
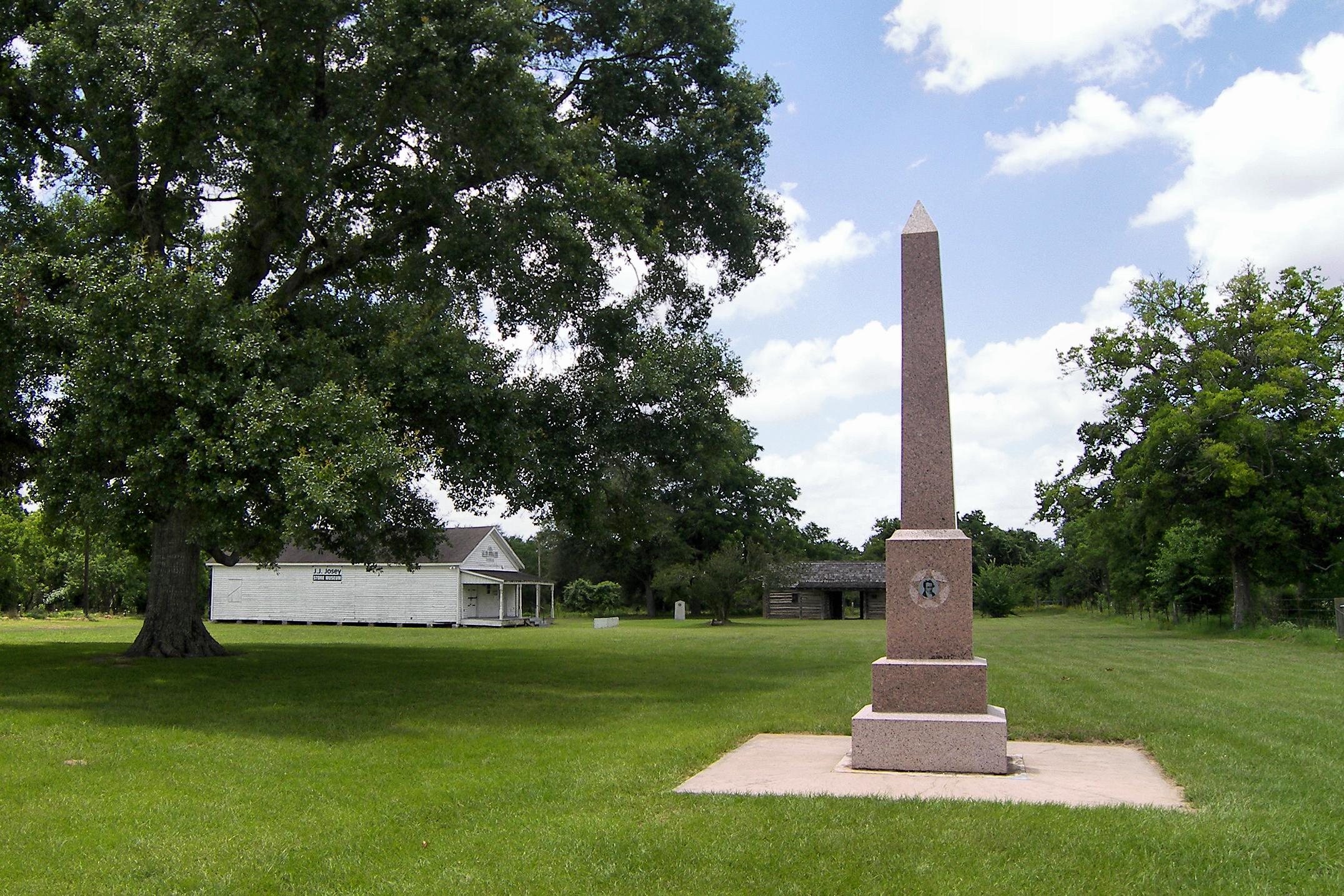
- Commemorative Obelisk at San Felipe de Austin State Historic Site

- Location within Texas Location within the United States
- Location: 15945 FM 1458, San Felipe, Texas
- Coordinates: 29°48′25″N 96°5′51″W
- Area: 97 acres (39 ha)
- Built: 1928
- Sculptor: John Angel
- Website: San Felipe de Austin State Historic Site
- NRHP reference No.: 16000716

Significant dates
- Added to NRHP: October 11, 2016
- Designated TSHS: 1940

San Felipe de Austin State Historic Site is an American historic site located in San Felipe, Austin County, Texas. The site preserves the location of the first provisional capital and Anglo-American colony in Mexican Texas.

== History ==
San Felipe de Austin was established on the south side of the Brazos River in 1823 by Stephen F. Austin, who initially brought 297 families, the Old Three Hundred, under a contract with the Mexican Government. The town's notable early inhabitants included Noah Smithwick and Horatio Chriesman. By 1830, the town had a population of about 200, general stores, taverns, a hotel, blacksmith shop, post office, newspaper and some forty or fifty log cabins. By the time of the Texas Revolution, San Felipe de Austin was behind only San Antonio as a commercial center. San Felipe de Austin's population approached 600 in 1835, and many more settlers lived nearby.

San Felipe de Austin played an important role in the events of the Texas Revolution. The Texian conventions of 1832 and 1833 and the Consultation assembly of 1835 were all held there. On March 29, 1836, the colonists burned the town to keep it from falling in to the hands of the Mexican Army during the Runaway Scrape.

After the Texan victory at San Jacinto, some colonists returned to San Felipe, but many did not. Although, San Felipe became the county seat of the newly established Austin County in 1837, the town never regained its former stature. A county election in 1846 transferred the county seat to Bellville. Local residents dedicated the original townsite as a commemorative site in 1928. In 1940, the town of San Felipe donated most of the original townsite property to the state.

== Current use ==
On January 1, 2008, the site was transferred from the Texas Parks and Wildlife Department to the Texas Historical Commission, which operates it as a state historic site open to the public. The site features a museum, interpretive trails, a statue of Stephen F. Austin, a replica log cabin, the 1847 Josey Store and relevant historical markers.

== See also ==
- National Register of Historic Places listings in Austin County, Texas
- List of Texas State Historic Sites
- Stephen F. Austin State Park
