= David May (merchant) =

American businessman (1848–1927)

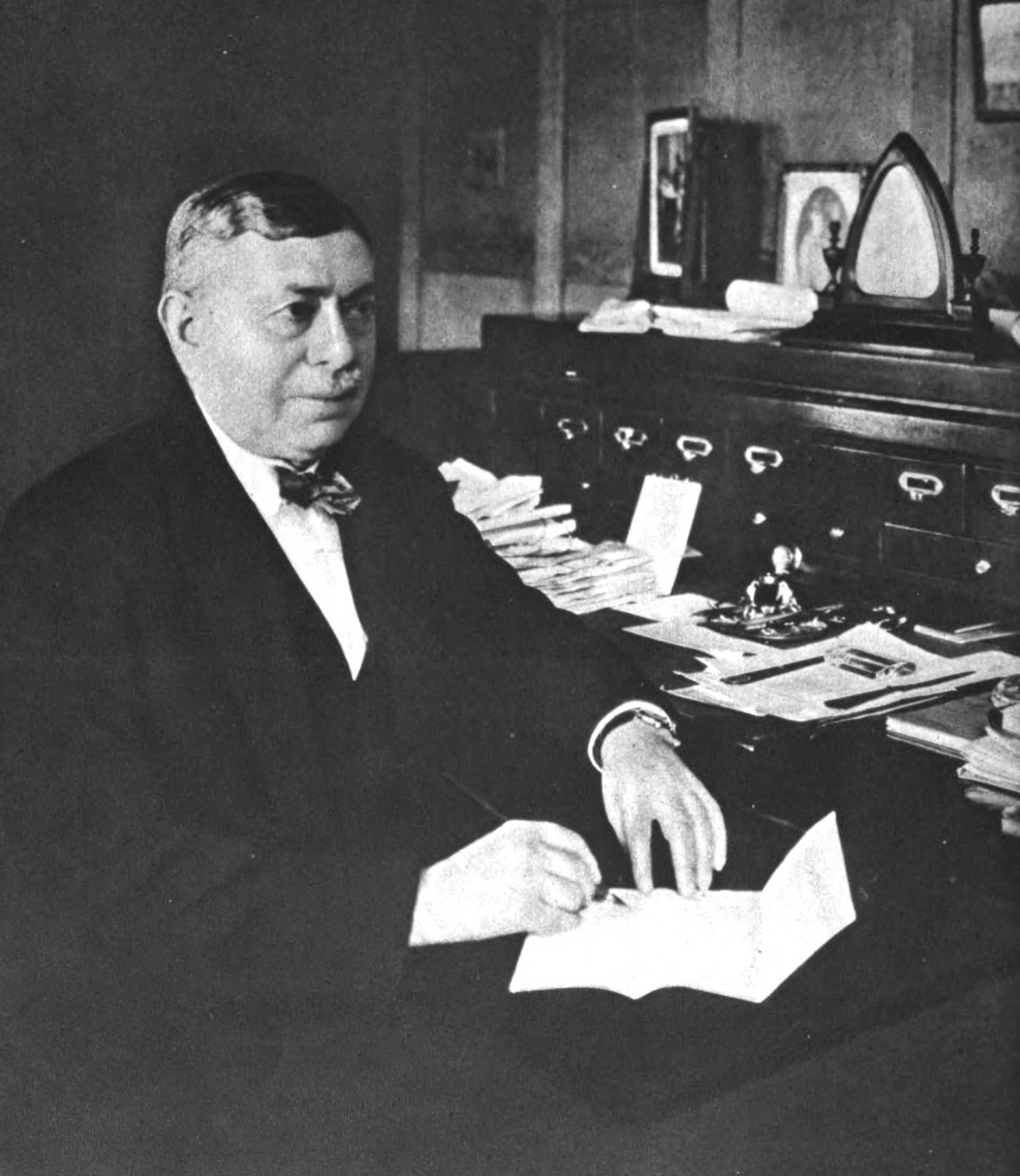
- May, circa 1925.
- Born: 1848; Kaiserslautern, Kingdom of Bavaria
- Died: 1927 (aged 79); Charlevoix, Michigan, US
- Occupation: Businessman
- Known for: founder of May Company
- Spouse: Rosa Shoenberg
- Children: 4
- Family: Morton D. May (grandson); Kathy May (great-granddaughter); Taylor Fritz (great-great-grandson)

David May (1848–1927) was an American businessman and founder of The May Department Stores Company.

== Early life and education ==
David May was born to a Jewish family in Kaiserslautern, then located in the Kingdom of Bavaria, a member of the German Confederation. In 1854, he immigrated with his family to the United States and settled in Cincinnati. As a young man he worked at a clothing factory, while attending night school at Cincinnati's Nelson Business College.

After moving for health reasons to Leadville, Colorado, then undergoing a boom due to silver mining, he partnered with future brother-in-law Moses Shoenberg and opened a dry goods store in 1877. In 1887, he purchased another store in Denver, Colorado, partnering with brothers-in-law Joseph and Louis Shoenberg (the Shoenbergs would later change their name to Beaumont). In 1888, he sold the Leadville store to Meyers Harris. In 1892, he expanded out of Colorado and purchased "The Famous Clothing Store" in St. Louis, Missouri, and in 1898, he purchased another store in Cleveland, Ohio, which he renamed the "May Company." In 1905, he moved the business headquarters to St. Louis. In 1910, the business was incorporated as "The May Department Stores Company" and began trading on the New York Stock Exchange in 1911. Also in 1911, he bought the William Bar Dry Goods Company in St. Louis and merged it with The Famous Clothing Store renaming the new entity, Famous-Barr. He continued to expand, purchasing the M. O’Neil Department Store in Akron, Ohio, in 1912 and A. Hamburger & Sons in Los Angeles in 1923.

== Legacy ==
May Company went on to become one of the largest department store chains in the United States through organic growth and acquisitions. Some of the chains acquired included: Bernheim-Leader in Baltimore, Maryland; Kaufmann's in Pittsburgh, Pennsylvania; The Daniels & Fisher Stores Company in Denver, Colorado; Hecht's in Baltimore, Maryland; G. Fox & Co. in Hartford, Connecticut; and Meier & Frank in Portland, Oregon.

== Personal life ==
In 1880, May married Rosa Shoenberg (b. 1860), his partner’s sister, in Leadville, Colorado. They had four children: Morton J. May (b. 1881), Tom May (b. 1883), Wilbur D. May (1898-1982), and Florene May (1903-1995). His daughter Florene married American architect Samuel Abraham Marx. His grandson Morton D. May succeeded his father in running the business, and was CEO from 1957 and chairman from 1967 to 1972. Tennis player Taylor Fritz is a descendant of May through Fritz's mother, Kathy May.

In 1877, he helped to found the Hebrew Benevolent Association in Leadville. "By 1884, he had become deeply involved in community affairs. Early in the year he was elected vice president of Temple Israel and appointed chairman of the building committee. The building was ready for services by September on land donated by May's very agreeable landlord, Horace Tabor. May was also "to have charge of burial grounds", an obligation passed down from the Hebrew Benevolent Association as it evolved into the Congregation Israel." In Denver, he was a member of Temple Emanuel.

In July, 1927, he was buried in St. Louis in a ceremony led by Rabbi Emeritus Samuel Sale.
