= Nelson Business College =

Business college in Ohio

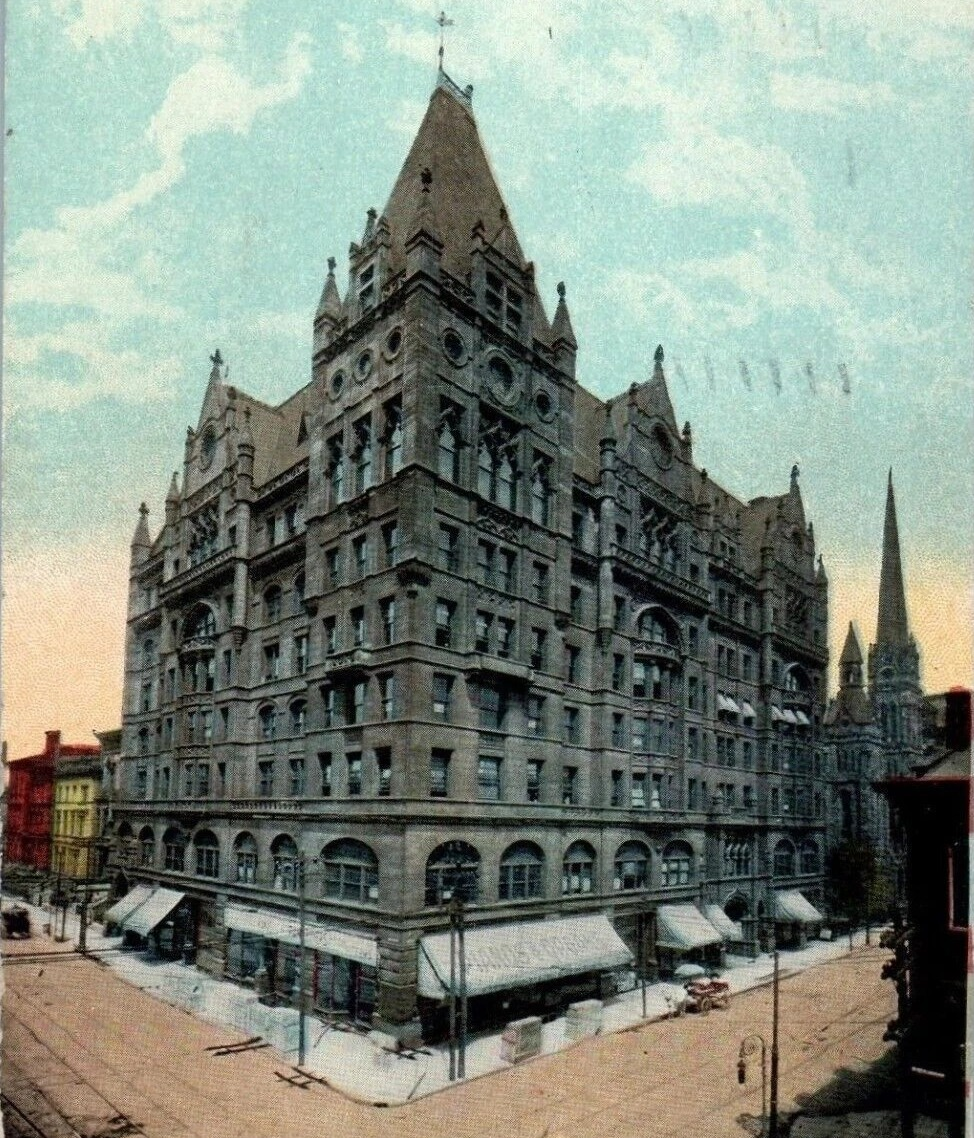
- The Odd Fellows Temple in Cincinnati, where the school was housed from 1900–1930
- Type: Business school
- Active: 1856–1930
- Founder: Richard Nelson
- Location: Cincinnati, Ohio

Nelson Business College was a business school in Cincinnati with branches in Springfield, Ohio, and Memphis, Tennessee. It was founded in 1856 and ultimately ceased operation in 1930.

The college was founded in 1856 by Richard Nelson, who thought that existing schools focused too much on theory and did not adequately prepare students for real-world issues in business. Instructors at the school were all businessmen, and students engaged in real business transactions. Following the school's establishment, Nelson opened a Preparatory Department for high school-aged students in 1889. Three additional branches of the school were established and managed by Richard's children. Richard's son, Richard J. Nelson, established a branch in Springfield, which was later managed by his brother Horatio. Two other branches, one in Memphis and one for women in Cincinnati, were opened by Richard's children, Albert and Ella, respectively.

Departments at the school included Business Penmanship, Mercantile Law, Banking and Business Transactions, Bookkeeping, Correspondence, Shorthand, and Typewriting. The school published its own textbooks, titled Mercantile Arithmetic, Nelson's New Bookkeeping, and Accounts and Business. In the 1917–1918 school year, the Nelson Business College in Cincinnati had 139 male students and 610 female students. Among its alumni were May Company founder David May and Olympic gold medalist James H. Snook.

The Cincinnati branch was initially housed in the Ohio Chamber of Commerce building, which was demolished in 1911. By 1900, the college had relocated to the Cincinnati Odd Fellows Temple, which was demolished in 1942. The Springfield branch was located in the Kelly Arcade, which was demolished in 1988. The Cincinnati and Springfield branches both had sports programs. They both had American football teams, while the Cincinnati branch also had a baseball team and the Springfield branch had a basketball team. The Springfield branch closed in 1914, while the Cincinnati branch closed in 1930.
