= Raková (Rokycany District) =

- Municipality
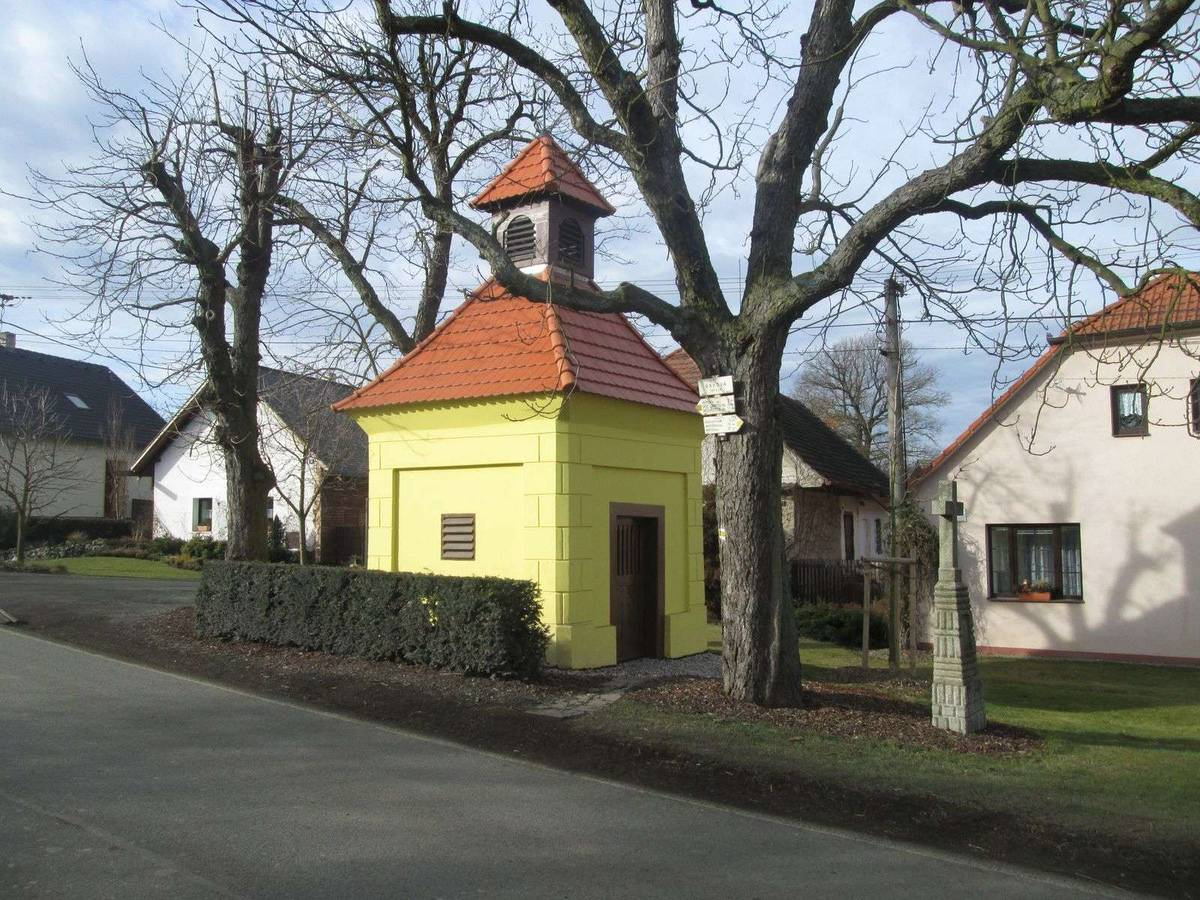
- Chapel in Raková

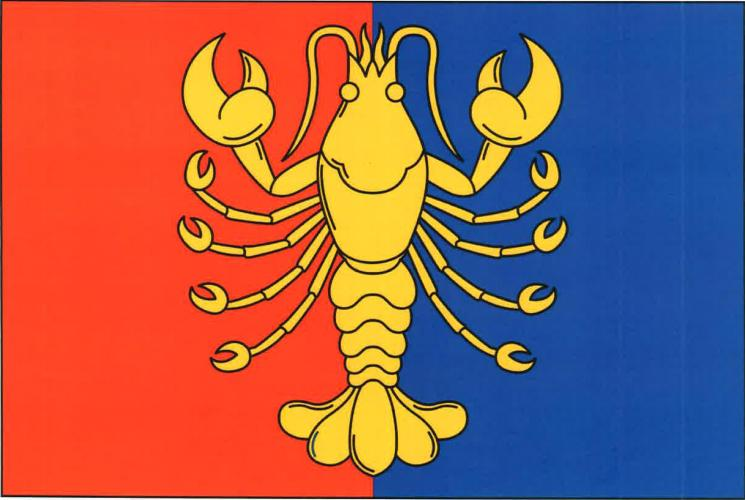
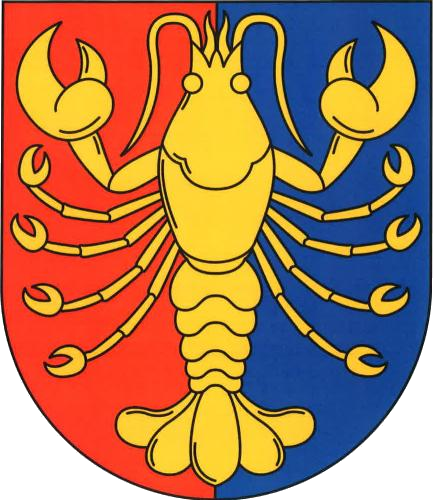
- Flag Coat of arms

- Location in the Czech Republic
- Coordinates: 49°42′2″N 13°34′55″E
- Country: Czech Republic
- Region: Plzeň
- District: Rokycany
- First mentioned: 1319

Area
  - Total: 5.44 km^{2} (2.10 sq mi)
- Elevation: 460 m (1,510 ft)

Population (2026-01-01)
  - Total: 238
  - Density: 43.7/km^{2} (113/sq mi)
- Time zone: UTC+1 (CET)
  - Summer (DST): UTC+2 (CEST)
- Postal code: 337 01
- Website: www.rakova.eu

Raková is a municipality and village in Rokycany District in the Plzeň Region of the Czech Republic. It has about 200 inhabitants.

Raková lies approximately 6 kilometres (4 mi) south of Rokycany, 16 km (9.9 mi) east of Plzeň, and 75 km (47 mi) south-west of Prague.

== Demographics ==
Historical population
Year	Pop.	±%
1869	285	—
1880	291	+2.1%
1890	253	−13.1%
1900	251	−0.8%
1910	285	+13.5%
1921	275	−3.5%
1930	290	+5.5%
1950	229	−21.0%
1961	248	+8.3%
1970	219	−11.7%
1980	185	−15.5%
1991	153	−17.3%
2001	167	+9.2%
2011	229	+37.1%
2021	243	+6.1%
Source: Censuses
