= Wesley, Texas =

- Unincorporated community
- Location within Texas Location within the United States
- Coordinates: 30°04′13″N 96°30′07″W
- Country: United States
- State: Texas
- County: Washington
- Elevation: 371 ft (113 m)
- Time zone: UTC-6 (Central (CST))
  - Summer (DST): UTC-5 (CDT)
- Area code: 979
- GNIS feature ID: 1349658

Wesley in an unincorporated community in Washington County, Texas, United States. According to the Handbook of Texas, the community had a population of 60 in 2000. It is located within the Greater Houston metropolitan area.

== History ==
The community's original name was Veseli, meaning joyous. The first Czech Protestant and Moravian Brethren church in North America was founded by Reverend Josef Opocensky in 1864. Two years later, the community became a supply point. It was officially erected in 1886. The state's first Czech reading club was established in 1867. A post office was established at Wesley that same year. The inside of the church was painted by pastor Bohuslav Emil Lacjak in 1889. It held a state convention in 1893. Its population was reported as 318 in 1890, declined to 200 as of 1930, then to 60 in 1959. The Wesley Brethren Church is on the National Register of Historic Places. In 1988, Wesley added a new church to better serve the Brethren community, the Brethren cemetery, and several homes. There are no longer any businesses there. The population was still listed as 60 in 2000.

== Geography ==
Wesley is located at the intersection of Farm to Market Roads 2502 and 332, 8 mi (13 km) southwest of Brenham in southwestern Washington County.

== Education ==
In 1859, Josef Mašik founded the first Czech school in Veseli in neighboring Austin County. The local Brethren church also served, as a school from 1866 to 1900. Today, the community is served by the Brenham Independent School District.

== See also ==
- Texas State Highway 171
