= John Angel (sculptor) =

American sculptor (1881–1960)

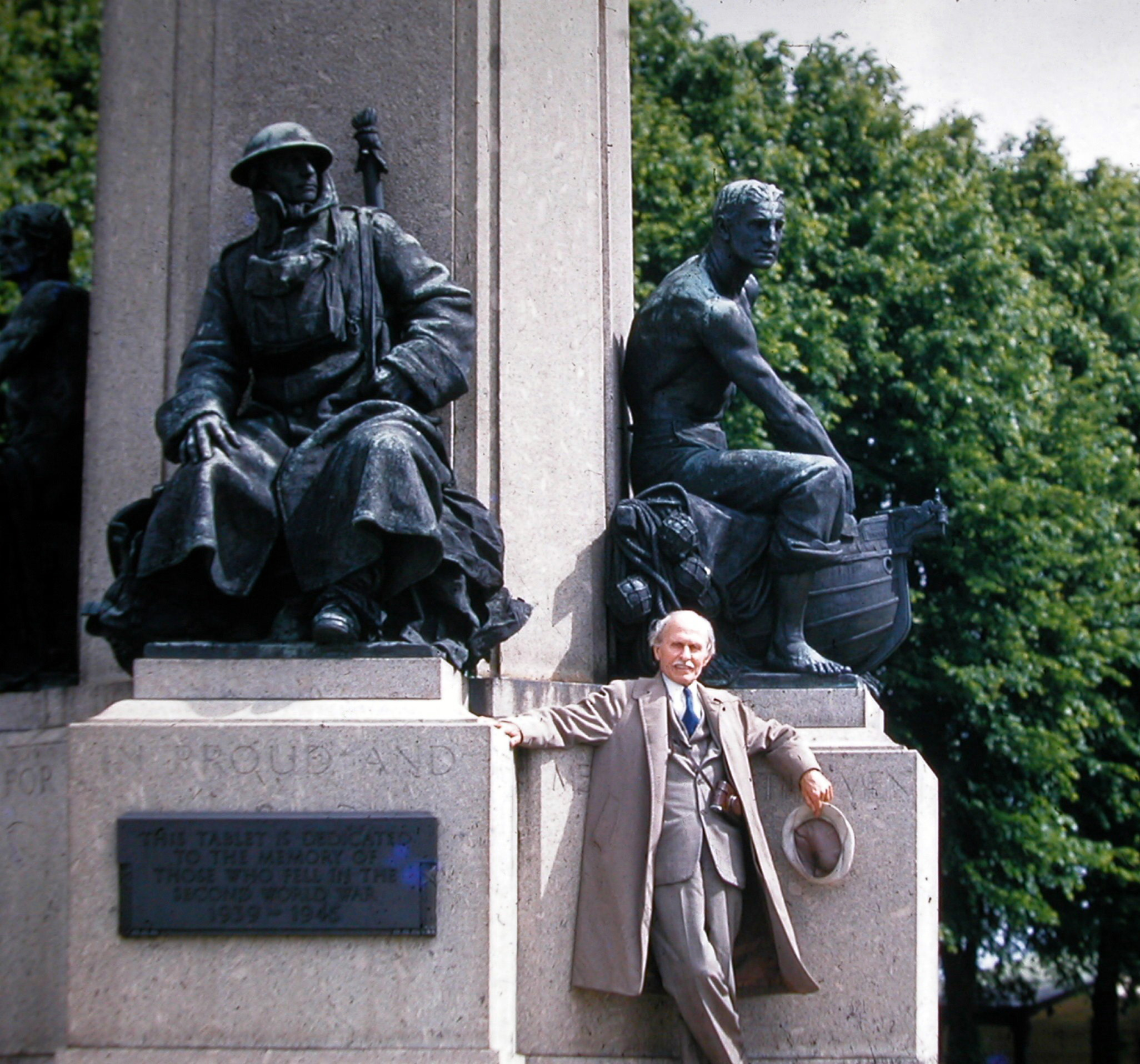
- Born: November 1, 1881; Newton Abbot, Devon, England
- Died: October 19, 1960 (aged 78); Sandy Hook, Connecticut, US
- Resting place: Zoar Cemetery
- Occupations: Sculptor and lecturer
- Spouse: Elizabeth Day Seymour
- Children: 2, including John Lawrence Angel

John Angel (November 1, 1881 – October 16, 1960) was a British-born American sculptor, architectural and ecclesiastical sculptor, medallist and lecturer. He emigrated to the United States where he created architectural sculpture. His work in the United Kingdom and the United States has been critically praised.

== Biography ==
Angel was born one of ten children in Newton Abbot, Devon, England, the son of a tailor, Samuel Angel (born c. 1850, Ashburton, Devon).

He entered a seven-year apprenticeship to a wood carver (Note: He worked either for Harry Hems a "great" carver of stone and wood in Exeter or in the shops of J. Wippell & Co. "renowned ecclesiastical suppliers"."John Angel F.R.B.S." Devon Heritage. However, another source says he initially worked for Herbert Read, an ecclesiastical restorer."Exeter's Northernhay War Memorial". Exeter Memories. June 5, 2009.) at the age of 14 years. He received formal training at the Exeter School of Art and later at the Lambeth School of Art. George Frampton became his mentor at the Royal Academy School, and his influence resonated in Angel's work. Angel also studied with Sir Thomas Brock. His professional progression is verified by census data: his occupation in the Census of England and Wales, 1901 was; "Wood Carver – Appren[tice]" and in the 1911 census, "Sculptor". Turning 30, he was elected in 1919 to the Royal Society of British Sculptors.

His work in the United Kingdom includes the Exeter War Memorial and the Bridgwater War Memorial—also known as the "Angel of Bridgwater".

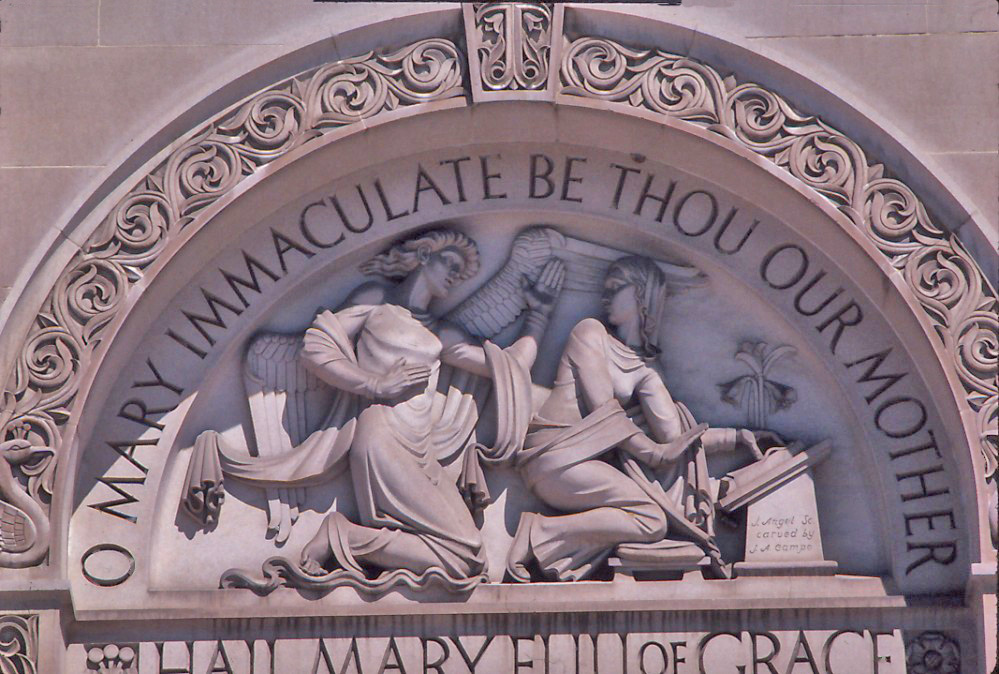
Signed tympanum at Basilica of the National Shrine of the Immaculate Conception, Washington D.C.

He was especially noted for evocative ecclesiastical sculptures. He spent many years doing the six bronze doors at St. Patrick's Cathedral in New York City. He teamed with architect Ralph Adams Cram in outfitting Pittsburgh's East Liberty Presbyterian Church, colloquially known as the "Cathedral of Hope," and did the Last Supper group in marble as well as tympana over several entrances. The commissions and awards were numerous.

In 1930 he completed the Founder's Memorial at Rice University—depicting a seated William Marsh Rice—in line with specifications by architect Ralph Adams Cram. He also produced sculptures for chapels at Princeton University, St. Paul's School (Concord, New Hampshire) and the Desloge Hospital (Desloge Chapel) in St. Louis, Missouri.

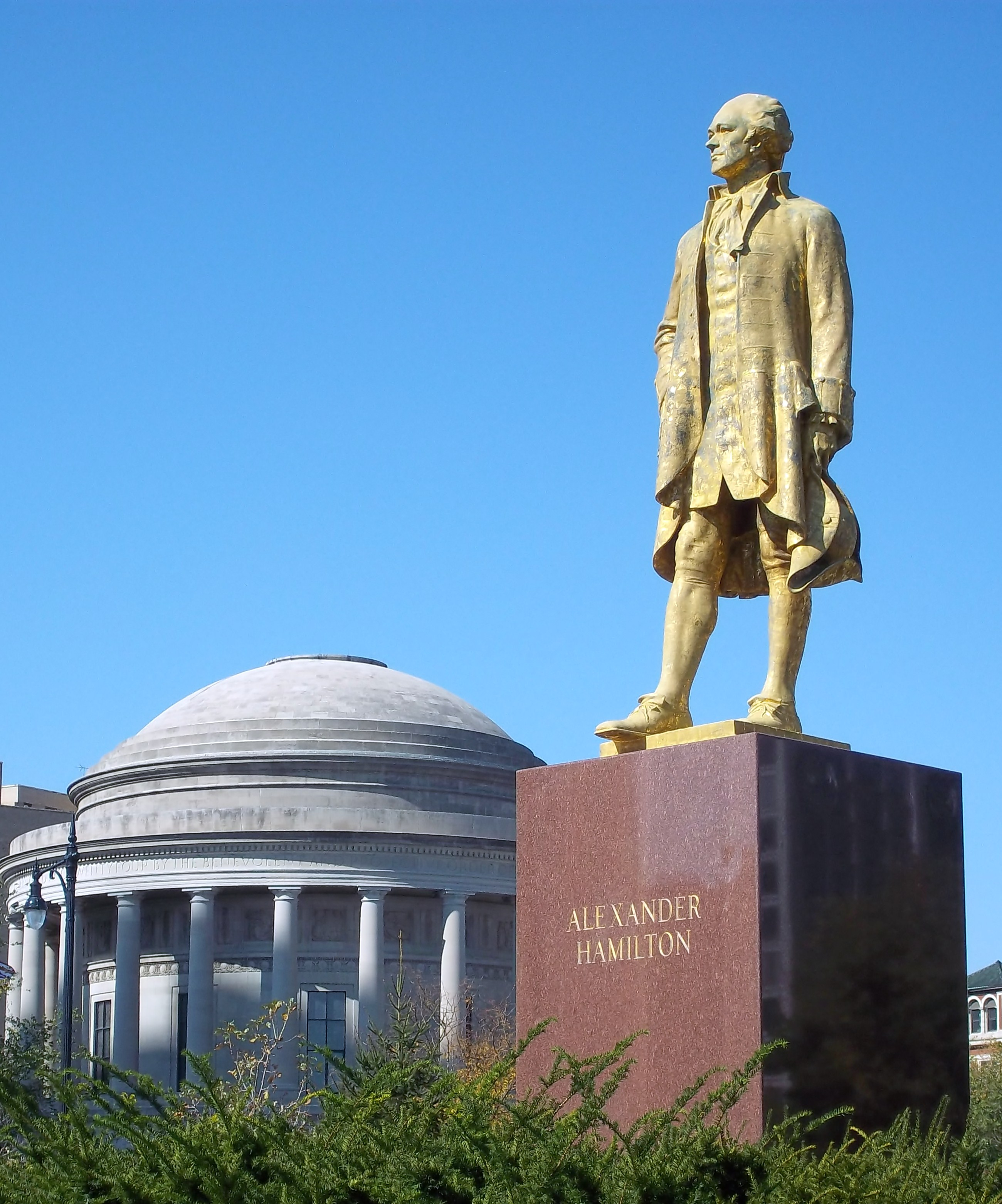
Statue of Alexander Hamilton in Chicago

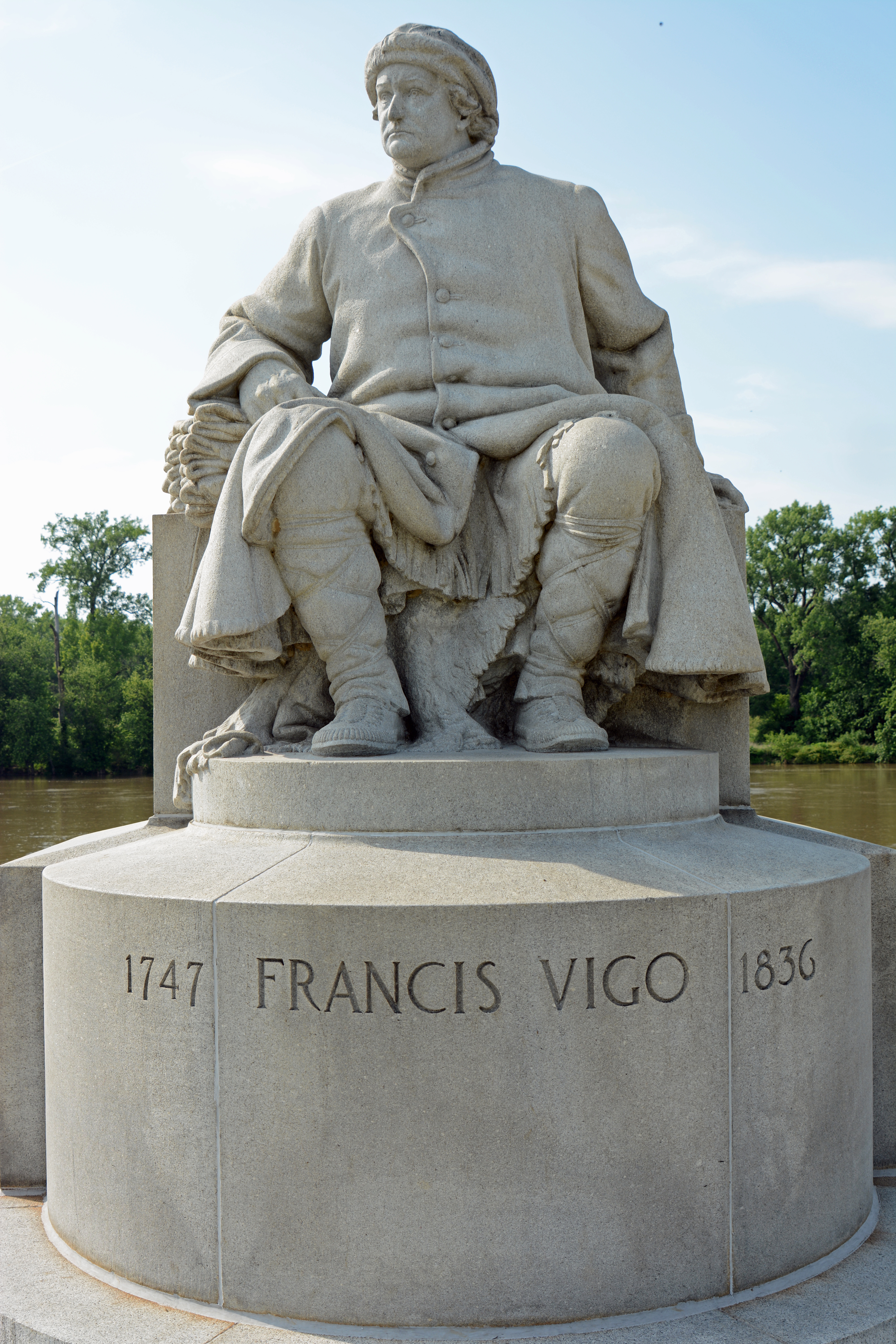
Francis Vigo

A statue of Alexander Hamilton in Lincoln Park in Chicago, Illinois was mired in controversy, at least concerning the surrounding architecture. Kate Sturges Buckingham (1858–1937), of the Buckingham Fountain family, commissioned the monument. Its impetus was that Treasury Secretary Hamilton "secured the nation’s financial future and made it possible for her own family to make its fortune in grain elevators and banking." Consequently, John Angel was hired to model a figurative sculpture and the Finnish architect Eliel Saarinen was to create a "colossal architectural setting" for it. The proposed 80-foot tall columned shelter was poorly received. By Ms. Buckingham's death in 1937, the sculpture's setting, location and design were uncertain. Conspiracy allegations surfaced, and the matter became mired in litigation. After the courts ordered the construction to be completed by 1953, the trustees hired architect Samuel A. Marx. It was built, but structural problems appeared, and it was eventually demolished in 1993. The statue was gilded, and is still on display.

== Personal life ==
While he was living in London, he married Elizabeth Day Seymour (1876 Hudson, Ohio – January 6, 1942) on April 25, 1914. They had met in Greece at a time when he "was a promising young sculptor." She was the daughter of Professor Thomas Day Seymour, of Yale University, and was educated at Bryn Mawr, (Note: "In 1893 she graduated from Hillhouse High School in New Haven, Connecticut, and passed the entrance examinations for Yale. While there was no possibility that she might enter the all-male university, it was necessary for her to pass the examination for Yale or Harvard in order to be accepted at Bryn Mawr College. Beth, like her father, loved classics and at Bryn Mawr she majored in Greek. When she graduated in June 1897 she received both the Bachelor of Arts and Master of Arts degrees." "Series IX. ELIZABETH DAY (SEYMOUR) ANGEL". Guide to the Seymour Family Papers MS 440. Yale University Library.) becoming an American classicist. They had two children and the family went to the United States in 1925, upon the request of architect Ralph Adams Cram. (Note: Other sources say that he embarked from England in 1928. "Sculptor John Angel". Your Archives. Archived from the original on December 7, 2011.) In his autobiography Cram wrote, "John Angel had come to America for a visit, and we had induced him, rather against his will I fancy, to do for us...Out of the blue, so to speak, had fallen upon us the very sculptor we had dreamed of but hardly dared hope for." (Note: There are, however, different opinions. An unnamed critic in TIME Magazine deadpanned: "The difference [between Angel's and Gothic Sculptures ] is sometimes too marked to miss. Like most attempts to recreate in one century what came naturally in another, Angel's work has more finish than feeling. It suffers from a kind of suavity which sometimes looks a little like soap carving; it lacks the hard energy of Gothic stone. One reason is that Angel never carves his figures direct; he first models them in clay, lets professional stone-carvers copy them, then adds the final touches." See TIME Magazine, infra.)

British-American biological anthropologist John Lawrence Angel (1915–1986) was Angel-Seymour's son.

== Death and legacy ==
When he died in Sandy Hook, Connecticut, he was reputed to be one of America's foremost sculptors; some considered him unrivaled for the times, comparing him to some of the finest sculptors of the Middle Ages. Two main works were at the Cathedral of St. John the Divine in New York City, and in the George Rogers Clark National Historical Park in Vincennes, Indiana. The latter includes a rendering of Francis Vigo. Angel himself proclaimed the ten-ton Vigo sculpture to be probably the best he had ever done. He described the style of most of his work as ersatz 13th Century Gothic. But says Angel, "I use all my knowledge of the human figure, so what we call Gothic is Gothic with a difference." By nature self-deprecating, he noted: "I never went to school; I'm an ignoramus."

His and his wife Elizabeth's remains are interred at Zoar Cemetery, also known as Berkshire Cemetery, in Fairfield County, Connecticut.

The Smithsonian Institution has 4.1 linear feet of his biographic material, books, sketches, 30 sketch books, photographs and papers, that were donated by Henry S. Angel in 1981. Elizabeth Day Seymour's papers are with her family's 51 linear feet on deposit at the Yale University Library.

== Honors ==
- Hon. LittD, Columbia University (1936)
- Fellow of the International Institute of Arts and Letters (1956)
- Member, Mediaeval Academy of America
- Member, Architectural League
- Member, National Sculpture Society of America
- Member, National Academy of Design.
- Member, National Sculpture Society,
- Member, Royal Society of Sculptors (1919)

== Bibliography ==
=== Sources ===
- "Art: Gothic, with a Difference" (paid subscription required). TIME Magazine. June 2, 1947.
- "John Angel F.R.B.S." Devon Heritage.
- "Sculptor John Angel". Your Archives. Archived from the original on December 7, 2011.
- "John Angel". Mapping the Practice and Profession of Sculpture in Britain and Ireland 1851-1951. University of Glasgow History of Art and HATII, online database. 2011. Archived from the original on May 25, 2019.
- "Series IX. ELIZABETH DAY (SEYMOUR) ANGEL". Guide to the Seymour Family Papers MS 440. Yale University Library.

=== Further reading ===
- A & C Black, 1920–2008 (December 2007). "ANGEL, John" (online edn). Who Was Who. Oxford University Press.
- Falk, Peter (1985). Who Was Who in American Art: compiled from the original thirty-four volumes of American art annual—Who's who in art, biographies of American artists active from 1898–1947. Madison, Connecticut: Sound View Press. ISBN 978-0-932087-00-3.
- Osborne, Harold, ed. (1975). The Oxford Companion to the Decorative Arts. Oxford: Oxford University Press, Clarendon Press. ISBN 0-19-866113-4.
- Powers, John; Powers, Deborah (2000). Texas Painters, Sculptors and Graphic Artists: a biographical dictionary of artists in Texas before 1942. Austin, Texas: Woodmont Books. ISBN 978-0-9669622-0-8.
- "John Angel photographs and printed materials, 1921–1955". Archives, Manuscript, Photographs Catalog. Smithsonian Institution Research Information System.
- "Seymour family papers". Yale University Library.

== See also ==
- Gothic art
