= Edward Boccia =

American painter and poet

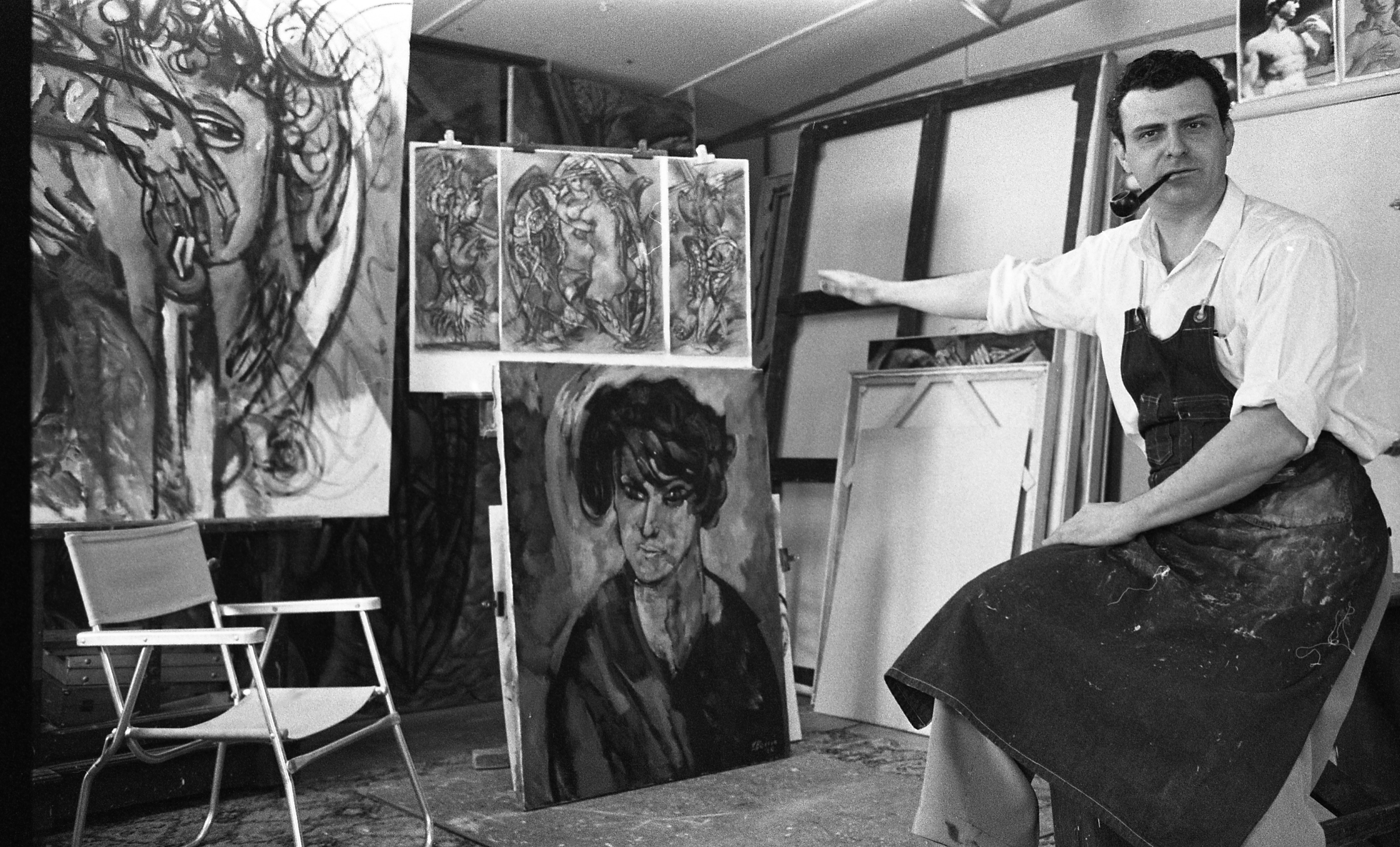

Edward Eugene Boccia (1921–2012) was an Italian American painter and poet who lived and worked in St. Louis, Missouri and served as a university professor in the School of Fine Arts, Washington University in St. Louis. Boccia's work consisted mostly of large scale paintings in Neo-Expressionist style, and reflect an interest in religion and its role in the modern world. His primary format was multi-panel paintings.

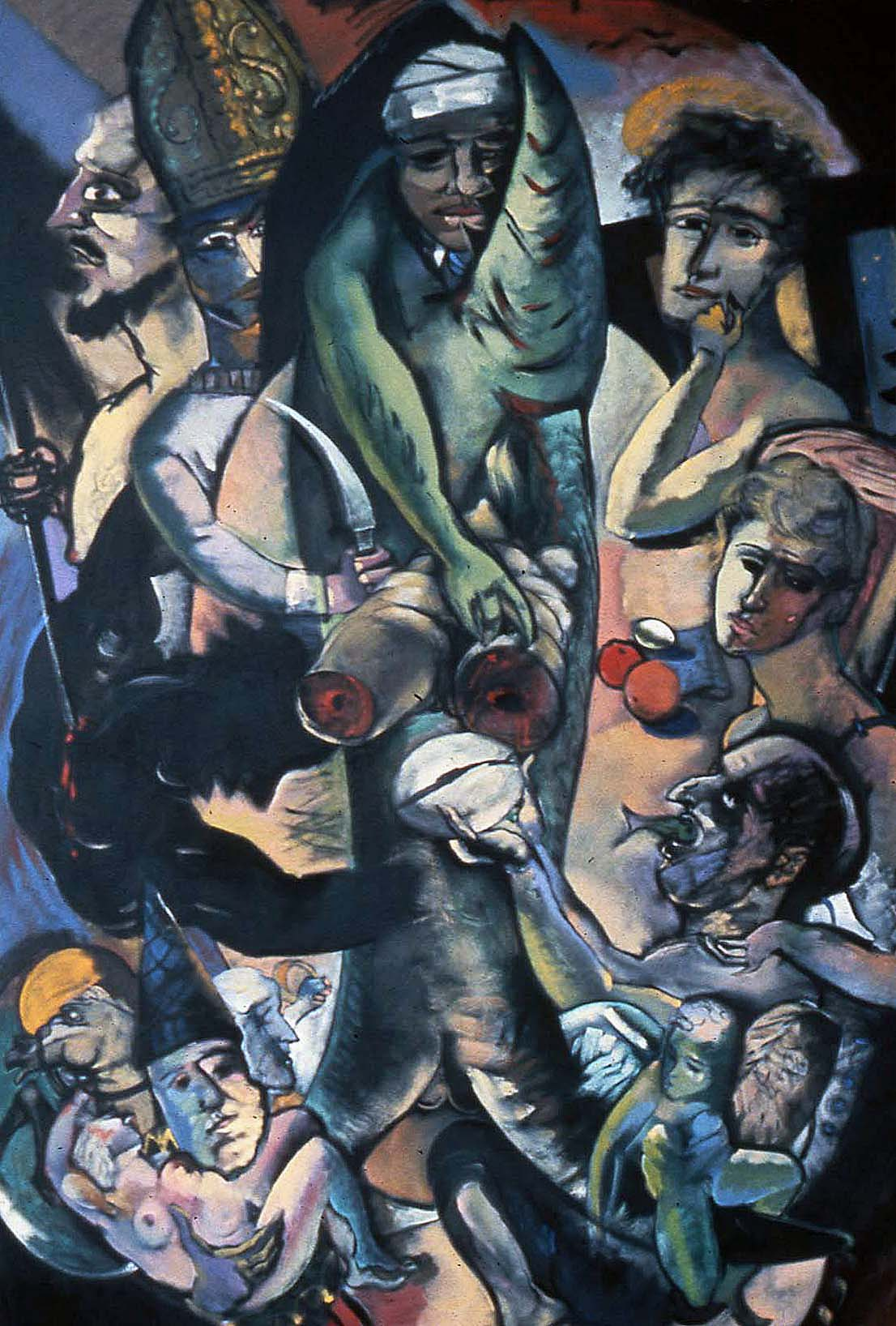
Edward Boccia 1968 Last Supper for Wayne

Widely exhibited during his lifetime, and the focus of a number of retrospective and solo exhibits, the artist created over 1,500 paintings, and over fifty large scale multi-panel format oil paintings in a neo-expressionist style, such as Mystique Marriage (1979). The American collector of avant garde European modernism Morton D. May was Boccia's most important patron, and held a large collection of Boccia's work. Research, exhibitions, and publications are overseen by the artist trust - The Edward E. Boccia and Madeleine J. Boccia Artist Trust, St. Louis who also own all copyrights and are the sole authenticator of the artist's works.

== Background ==
Born to Italian parents in Newark, New Jersey, Boccia attended the Newark School of Fine Arts. He studied at the Pratt Institute and the Art Students League, New York, where he met his wife Madeleine Wysong. Boccia served in World War II, in the 603rd Camouflage engineer unit known today as the Ghost Army. He continued to paint and draw during his time overseas, sending his artwork back to his mother. After the war, Boccia earned both a bachelor's degree and a master's degree at Columbia University, concurrently serving as Dean and teaching art at the Columbus Art School in Ohio, where he introduced the Bauhaus teaching method to his students. In 1951, he was appointed Assistant Dean of Fine Arts at Washington University in St. Louis, Missouri, where he taught painting for over 30 years, until his retirement in 1986.

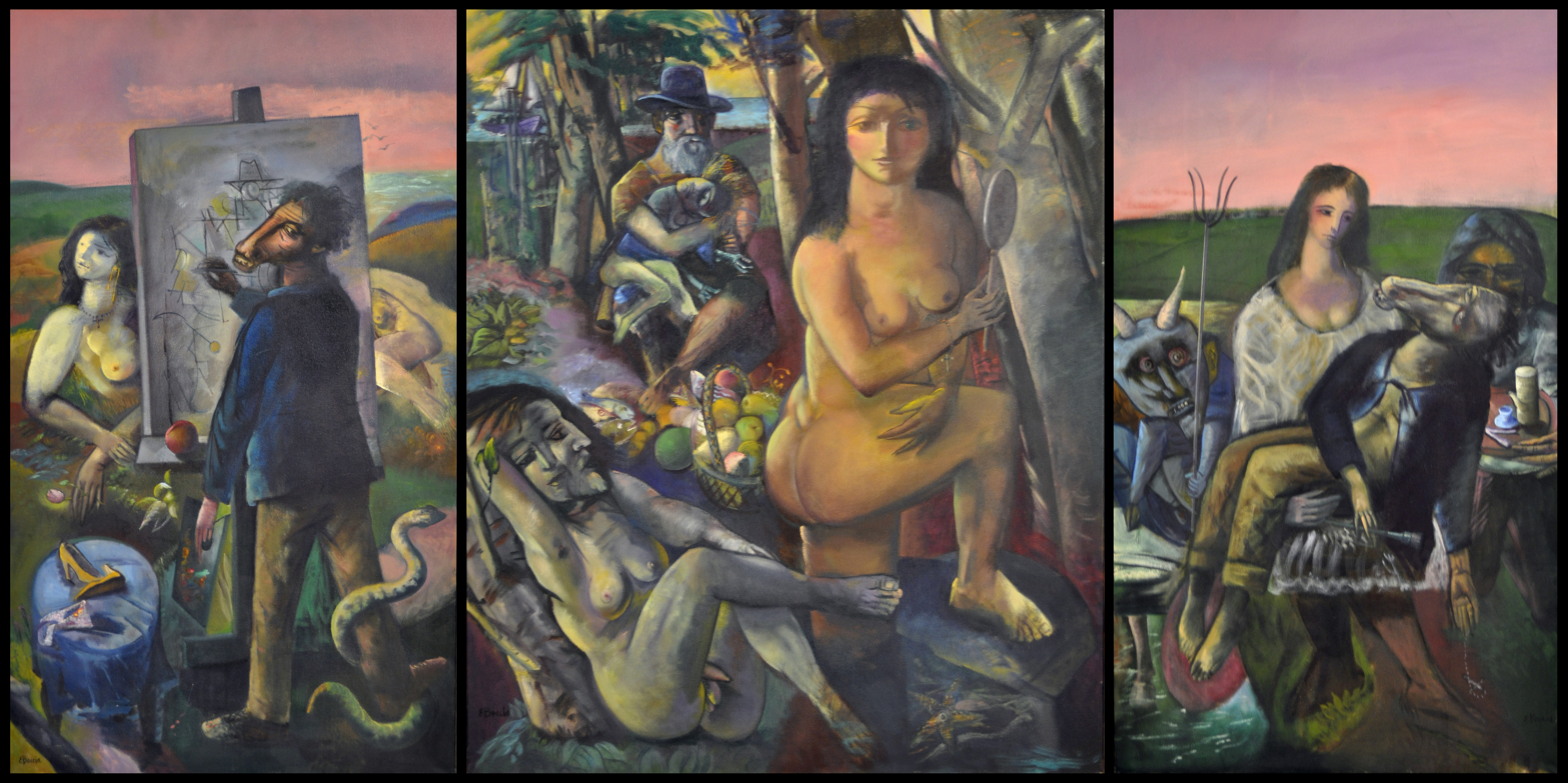
Edward Boccia Your Feast Shall be Turned into Mourning 1972

== Artwork ==
Boccia's themes are linked to the mystical, occult, and theosophical traditions of modern art including the belief in the messianic role of the artist, seen in the work of the Symbolists, as well as the pictures of Paul Gauguin and Oskar Kokoschka among others. Specifically, Boccia includes numerous self-portraits, and uses examples of esoteric imagery such as the androgyne and the hermaphrodite. The works for which the artist is most well known are the multi-panel works in Expressionist style.

The artist was part of the group of 15 exhibiting alongside fellow modernists such as E. Oscar Thalinger and Werner Drewes. In 1956, Boccia began his multi-panel paintings, which were purchased after completion, among others, by Morton D. May between 1956 and 1977. Some of his most noteworthy series of multi-paneled paintings consist of up to nine panels. Other paintings remained hidden in his studio for over fifty years and were uncovered recently by a research project led by the late artist's trust. Boccia's work shows the influence of Max Beckmann, and he was well aware of the older artist's work through May's collection.

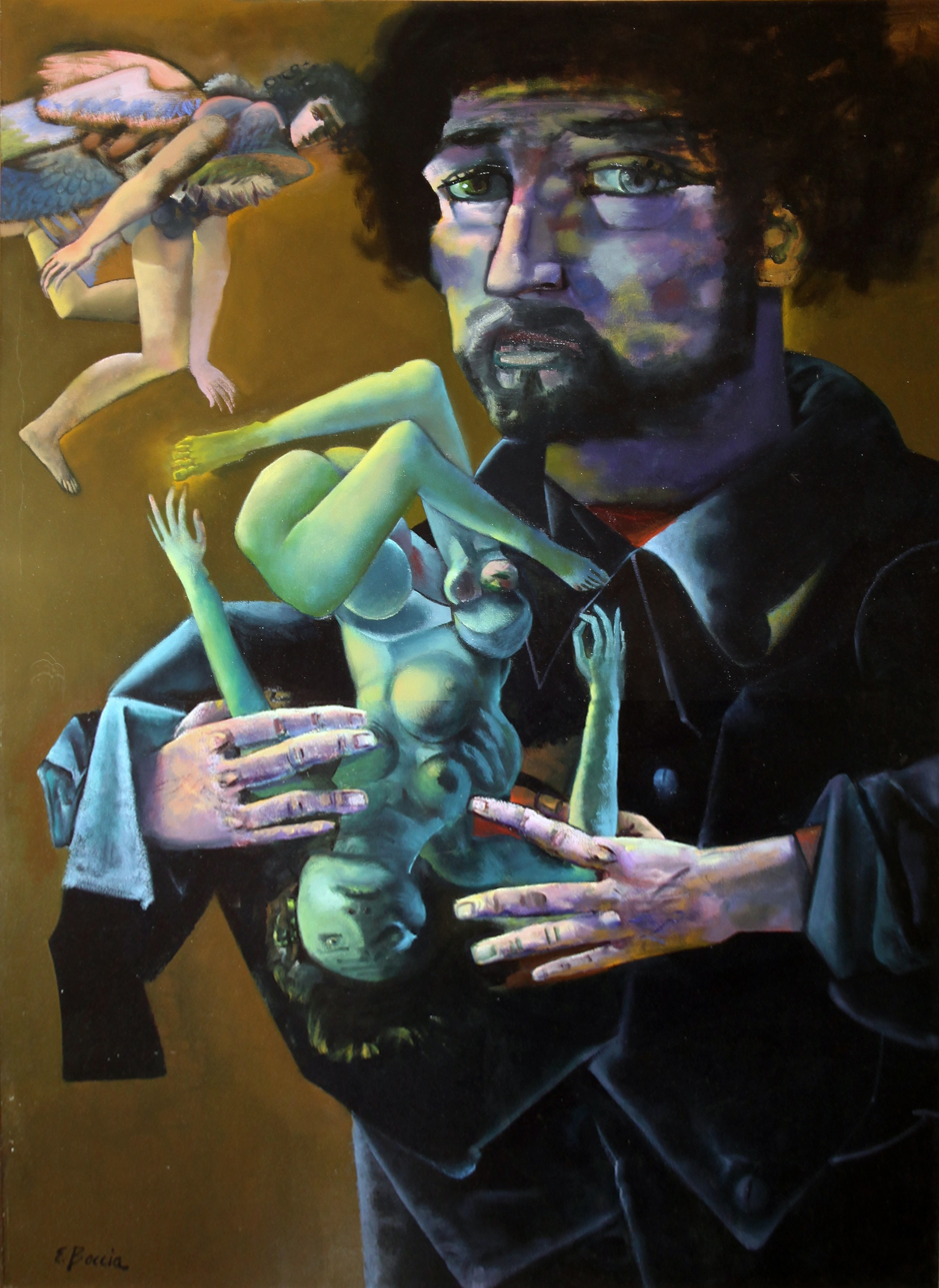
Edward E. Boccia Pieta 1984

Some of the most well regarded pieces deal with the death of his son David in 1984 and are painted in a combination of styles including Surrealist, Expressionist and Magical Realist including David's Death (2004) and Pietà (1984) and Eugene's Journey (1996)

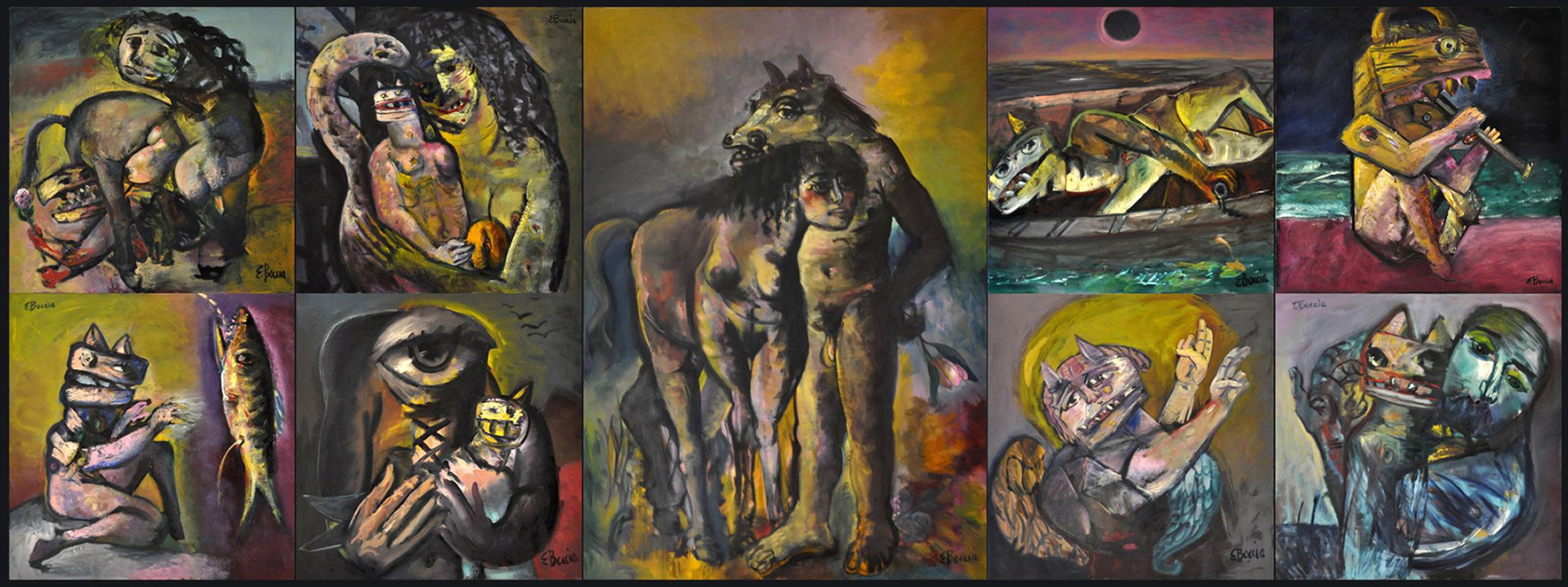

Boccia painted until his death at the age of 91.

Boccia is currently the subject of a large-scale critical monograph Edward Boccia: Painter of Nightmares and Dreams by Rosa JH Berland in cooperation with the Edward E. and Madeleine J. Boccia Trust, St. Louis, Missouri to be published by Hirmer Verlag, Munich, September 2026.

Boccia was the subject of numerous solo exhibits and group shows, the most recent being the 2024 exhibit at the John D. Calandra Italian American Institute' entitled 'Edward E Boccia, Postwar American Expressionist',

The Ghost Army of World War II, The Salmagundi Club Gallery, New York, New York June 14, 2015 - June 25, 2015" honoring the special battalion of WW II, the Ghost Army, whose artistic ingenuity allowed them to create visual tricks to fool the Nazis into believing the Allied ground power was stronger than the reality. This exhibit represented a culmination of the PBS 2013 Ghost Army documentary film as well as the 2015 book, The Ghost Army of World War II, by Rick Beyer and Elizabeth Sayles, Princeton Architectural Press.

Other recent exhibits include posthumous shows at St. Louis University Museum of Art and The Sheldon Art Galleries in 2013. Retrospectives of his works have been held posthumously as well as during the artist's life in St. Louis.

== Museum collections ==
Boccia's art is found in the collections of art museums including Columbia University, New York, Molloy University, Rockville Centre, New York, Pratt Institute, Art Students League, New York, The Kemper Art Museum, St. Louis; St. Louis University Museum of Art; St. Louis Art Museum; Museum of Art, Fort Lauderdale; The Weatherspoon Art Museum, The University of North Carolina, Greensboro; and the National Gallery Athens, Greece.

In addition to these museum collections, a number of commissioned works are on view in religious and public institutions such as the Catholic Student Center at Washington University in St. Louis.
