= Old Masonic Hall (Bellville, Texas) =

- U.S. National Register of Historic Places
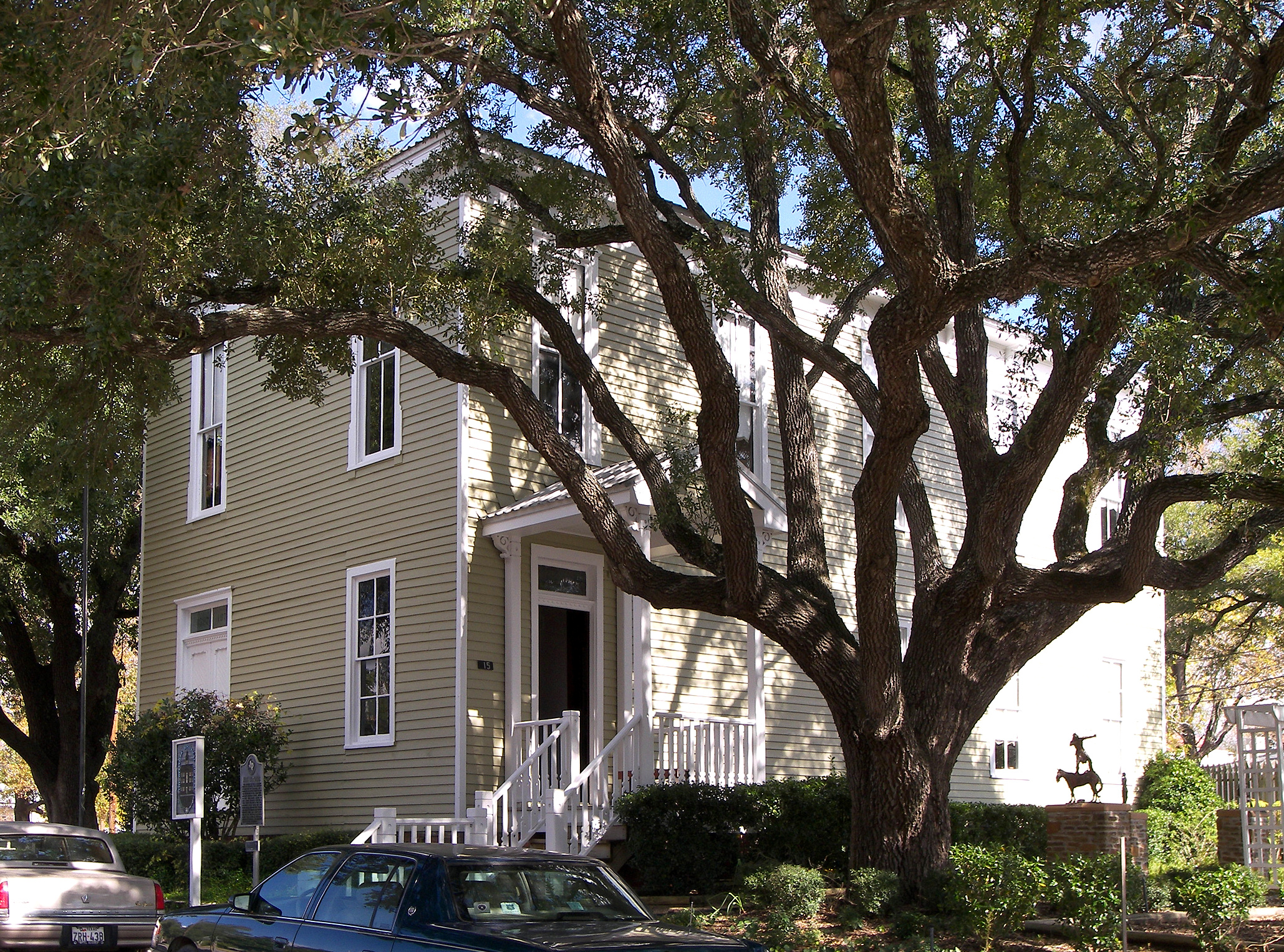
- Old Masonic Hall in 2008

- Location within Texas Location within the United States
- Location: 15 N. Masonic St., Bellville, Texas
- Coordinates: 29°57′3″N 96°15′28″W
- Area: less than one acre
- Built: 1886
- Architect: J.J. Stopple
- NRHP reference No.: 86001611
- Added to NRHP: August 14, 1986

The Old Masonic Hall (also known as Old Masonic Lodge Building) is a historic building in Bellville, Texas. Constructed in 1886, it was listed on the National Register of Historic Places in 1986. Today, the building houses the headquarters of the Bellville Historical Society.

== See also ==
- National Register of Historic Places listings in Austin County, Texas
