= Rakova Bara =

- Village
- Location within Serbia
- Coordinates: 44°33′22″N 21°40′14″E
- Country: Serbia
- District: Braničevo District
- Municipality: Kučevo

Population (2002)
  - Total: 464
- Time zone: UTC+1 (CET)
  - Summer (DST): UTC+2 (CEST)

Rakova Bara is a village in the municipality of Kučevo, Serbia. According to the 2002 census, the village has a population of 464 people.
