= Samuel Abraham Marx =

American architect

Samuel Abraham Marx (August 27, 1885 – January 1964) was an American architect, designer and interior decorator. He is generally considered a modernist, influenced by the International style.

== Biography ==
Marx was born to a Jewish family in Natchez, Mississippi, in 1885. He graduated from MIT's Department of Architecture in 1907, with his thesis Design for a Synagogue. He then went studying to Europe for eight months.

Before opening his own practice, he worked for Killham & Hopkins in Boston, and for Shepley, Rutan & Coolidge in Chicago. While he originally designed interior of hotels and department stores, Marx became a mostly residential architect, designing stripped-down buildings reminiscent of Mies van der Rohe's works, while he became respected for his aesthetic and functional integrated furnitures and decorative elements.

Along with his third wife, Florene May (daughter of David May, the founder of The May Department Stores Company), he was an avid art collector. While many of his buildings were razed, his enormous collection was dispersed over the years.

== Posterity ==
House Beautiful magazine (1948) said about his works “it’s frequently hard to say where the architecture ends and the furniture begins.”

Relatively overshadowed as an architect, Marx is, and has been a major influence in furniture design (notably industrial). Liz O'Brien's recent monography, Ultramodern, Samuel Marx: Architect, Designer, Art Collector asserts his role in the modernist movement.

== Notable works ==
As an architect :

- Alexander Hamilton Memorial in Chicago's Lincoln Park
- New Orleans Museum of Art
- Edward G. Robinson’s home, Los Angeles
- May Company department store in Los Angeles
- Tom May's house, Los Angeles
- Morton D. May's house, St Louis (razed)

As an interior decorator :

- Pierre Hotel, New York

Works of his as a designer are exhibited in the Metropolitan Museum of Art, the Museum of Modern Art (MoMA) and the Chicago Art Institute, and some are regularly auctioned by private decorative arts dealers.

== See also ==
- John Angel (sculptor)
