= Roesler House =

- U.S. National Register of Historic Places
- Location within Texas Location within the United States
- Location: Texas Route 159, about 2 miles (3.2 km) west of Nelsonville, Texas
- Coordinates: 29°58′32″N 96°26′15″W
- Area: less than one acre
- Built: 1892
- Built by: Roesler, F. A.
- NRHP reference No.: 84001570
- Added to NRHP: May 10, 1984

Roesler House, in Austin County, Texas about 2 miles (3.2 km) west of Nelsonville, was listed on the National Register of Historic Places in 1984.

It is a board-and-batten farmhouse built in 1892. It has also been known as the Old Roesler Place.

It is a one-and-a-half-story building which is a "good example of a late nineteenth century vernacular German farmhouse in the area."

It was a home of Frederick August Roesler. As The Old Roesler Place, it is a Recorded Texas Historical Landmark.
