= Nelsonville, Texas =

- Unincorporated community
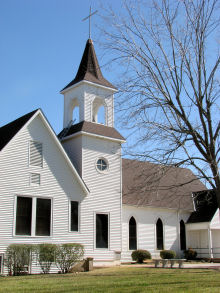
- Nelsonville Brethren Church

- Location within Texas Location within the United States
- Coordinates: 29°58′36″N 96°24′12″W
- Country: United States
- State: Texas
- County: Austin
- Elevation: 302 ft (92 m)
- Time zone: UTC-6 (Central (CST))
  - Summer (DST): UTC-5 (CDT)
- Area code: 979
- GNIS feature ID: 1363667

Nelsonville is an unincorporated community in Austin County, Texas, United States. According to the Handbook of Texas, the community had a population of 110 in 2000. It is located within the Greater Houston metropolitan area.

== History ==
Nelsonville was settled in the 1850s, with one being Edward Daughtry in 1855; it was named for D. D. Nelson, who opened a store in the community after the Civil War ended. Isaac Lewis also managed a store, sawmill, gristmill and cotton gin at the same time. The town's first settlers were primarily Bohemian immigrants who arrived in the late 1860s to the early 1870s and bought land grants. Nelsonville's post office opened in 1872; postmaster R. W. Thompson also served as the town physician. The post office was closed in 1909. The community extended northwest through a watershed that separated the drainage of the east and west forks of Mill Creek toward Industry. It also had a church, three steam-powered mills and gins, and 100 residents. It went up to 158 in 1900. It returned to 100 in the early 1930s. It had six businesses in 1936, but most of those closed not long after. It is now a farm community, with 110 residents in the early 1990s. As of 2000, Nelsonville had a population of 110. Most of the community's residents came from the Czech Republic and a local church serves as the community's centerpiece.

== Geography ==
Nelsonville is situated at the intersection of SH 159 and FM 2502. The county seat at Bellville is 9.5 miles (15.3 km) east-southeast on SH 159, while Industry is 6.1 miles (9.8 km) west on the same highway. Bleiblerville is 3.4 miles (5.5 km) to the northwest on FM 2502. Farm to Market Road 2754 (FM 2754) crosses FM 2502 at right angles at a distance of 1.2 miles (1.9 km) northwest of Nelsonville. Other roads radiating from the community are Shupak Road to the northeast and Skalak Road to the south. Between Nelsonville and Bellville, SH 159 is also known as Old Nelsonville Road while it is named Fordtran Boulevard between Nelsonville and Industry. The Nelsonville Brethren Church is located on Nelsonville Church Road which forms a triangle with SH 159 and FM 2502.

The Roesler House, which is located in the community, is listed on the National Register of Historic Places.

== Education ==
Nelsonville had its own school in 1885. Today, the community is served by the Bellville Independent School District.

== Notable person ==
- Leo Meyer, politician who married Margaret Lewis and became mayor of Bellville.
