= Zádveřice-Raková =

- Municipality
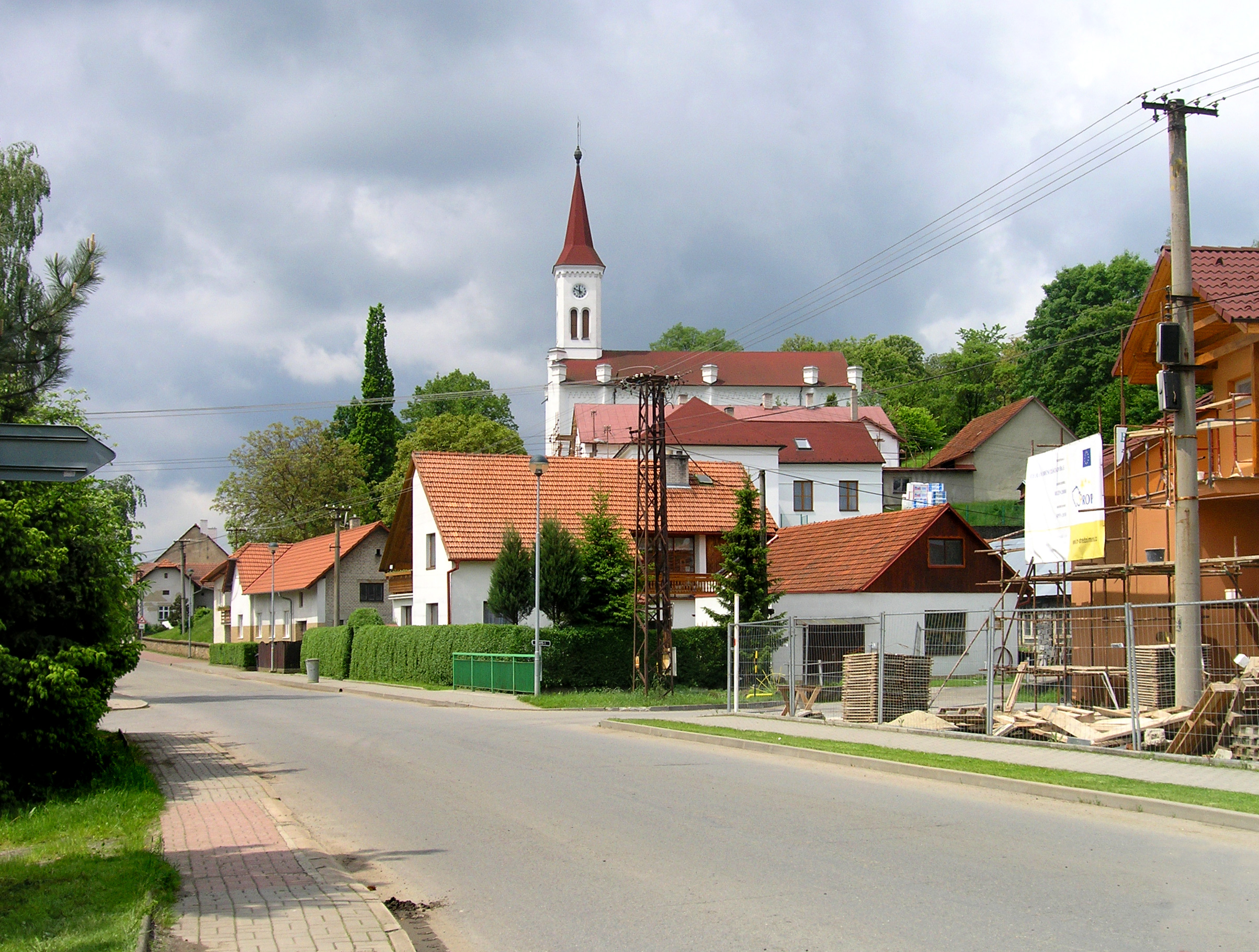
- Evangelical church in Zádvěřice

- Flag Coat of arms

- Location in the Czech Republic
- Coordinates: 49°12′58″N 17°48′13″E
- Country: Czech Republic
- Region: Zlín
- District: Zlín
- First mentioned: 1261

Area
  - Total: 17.97 km^{2} (6.94 sq mi)
- Elevation: 264 m (866 ft)

Population (2026-01-01)
  - Total: 1,532
  - Density: 85.25/km^{2} (220.8/sq mi)
- Time zone: UTC+1 (CET)
  - Summer (DST): UTC+2 (CEST)
- Postal code: 763 12
- Website: www.zadverice-rakova.cz

Zádveřice-Raková is a municipality in Zlín District in the Zlín Region of the Czech Republic. It has about 1,500 inhabitants.

Zádveřice-Raková lies approximately 11 kilometres (7 mi) east of Zlín and 263 km (163 mi) east of Prague.

== Administrative division ==
Zádveřice-Raková consists of two municipal parts (in brackets population according to the 2021 census):

- Zádveřice (1,233)
- Raková (215)

== History ==
The first written mention of Zádveřice is from 1261, while Raková was first mentioned in 1549. Zádveřice and Raková merged in 1960.

== Demographics ==
Historical population
Year	Pop.	±%
1869	1,204	—
1880	1,218	+1.2%
1890	1,214	−0.3%
1900	1,261	+3.9%
1910	1,286	+2.0%
1921	1,376	+7.0%
1930	1,468	+6.7%
1950	1,454	−1.0%
1961	1,539	+5.8%
1970	1,449	−5.8%
1980	1,287	−11.2%
1991	1,277	−0.8%
2001	1,280	+0.2%
2011	1,387	+8.4%
2021	1,448	+4.4%
Source: Censuses
