= Orchard, Texas =

- City
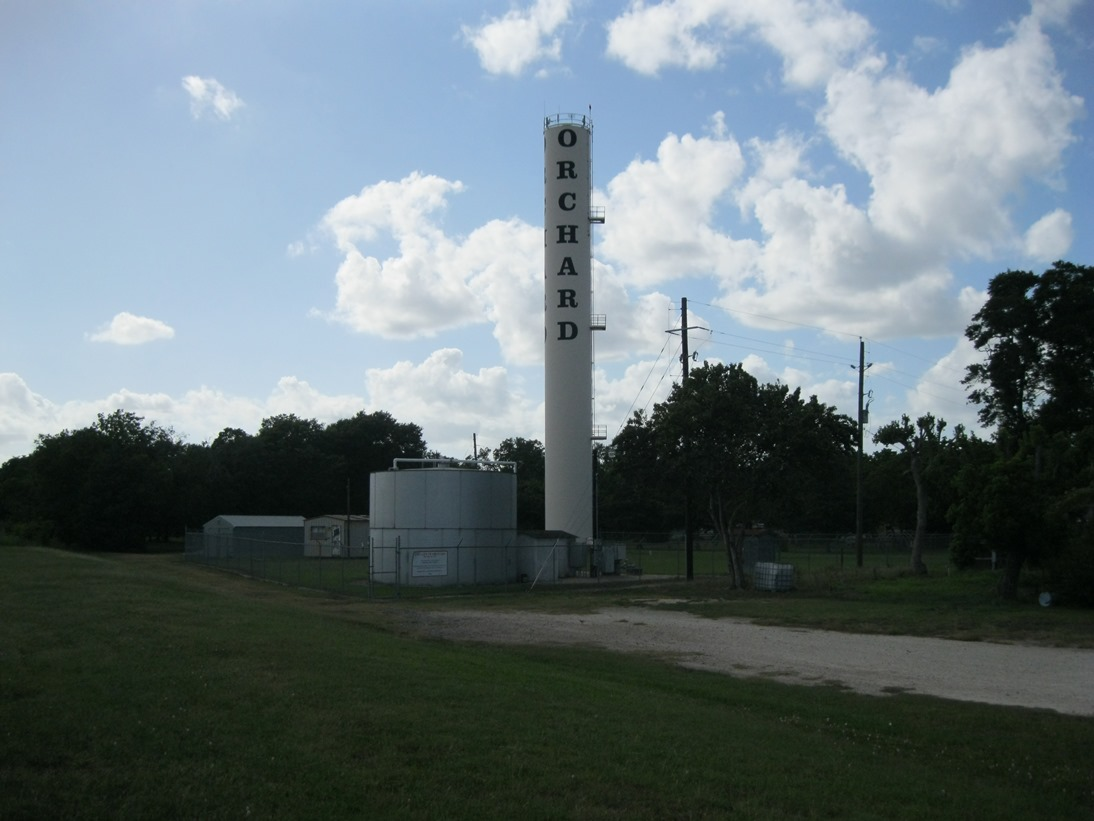
- Orchard's distinctive water tower

- Location of Orchard, Texas
- Coordinates: 29°36′7″N 95°58′8″W
- Country: United States
- State: Texas
- County: Fort Bend

Area
  - Total: 0.36 sq mi (0.94 km^{2})
  - Land: 0.36 sq mi (0.94 km^{2})
  - Water: 0 sq mi (0.00 km^{2})
- Elevation: 125 ft (38 m)

Population (2020)
  - Total: 313
  - Density: 860/sq mi (330/km^{2})
- Time zone: UTC-6 (Central (CST))
  - Summer (DST): UTC-5 (CDT)
- ZIP code: 77464
- Area code: 979
- FIPS code: 48-54192
- GNIS feature ID: 1343307
- Website: orchardtexas.net

Orchard is a city in western Fort Bend County, Texas, United States, within the Houston–Pasadena–The Woodlands metropolitan area. The community is located along State Highway 36 (SH 36) and the BNSF Railway between Rosenberg in Fort Bend County and Wallis in Austin County. The population was 313 at the 2020 census, down from 352 at the 2010 census.

== Geography ==
Orchard is located at 29°36′7″N 95°58′8″W (29.602015, –95.968821). Most of the city is north of the BNSF Railway tracks, with its streets laid out north-south and east-west. Missouri Street is the major north-south artery, intersecting SH 36 and crossing the railroad. Missouri Street goes north as far as Brazos Elementary School. Kibler Road is an important east-west artery on which the town center is situated. Kibler Road starts at FM 1489 to the west of Orchard and ends at Long Lane to the east. FM 1489 intersects SH 36 to the west and goes south toward Tavener and north toward Simonton. Wallis is 6 miles (10 km) to the northwest on SH 36, while Rosenberg is 10 miles (16 km) to the southeast on the same highway.

According to the United States Census Bureau, the city has a total area of 0.39 square miles (1.0 km^{2}), all land.

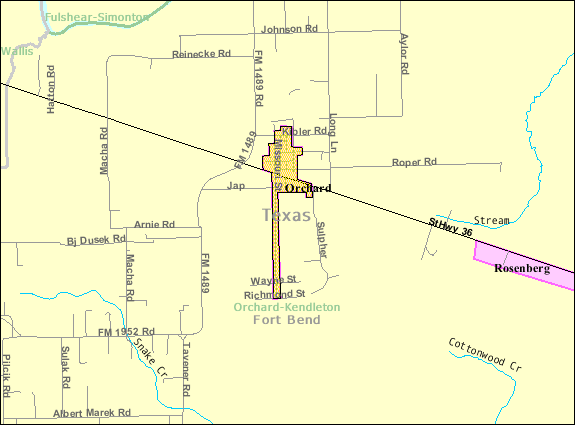
Map of Orchard

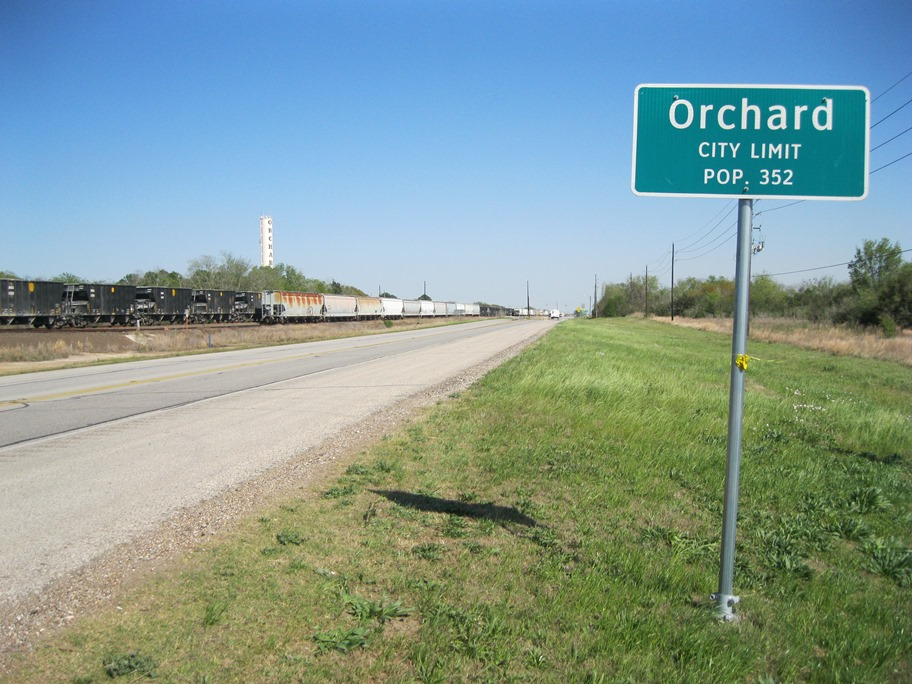
City limit sign on Hwy 36 looking SE

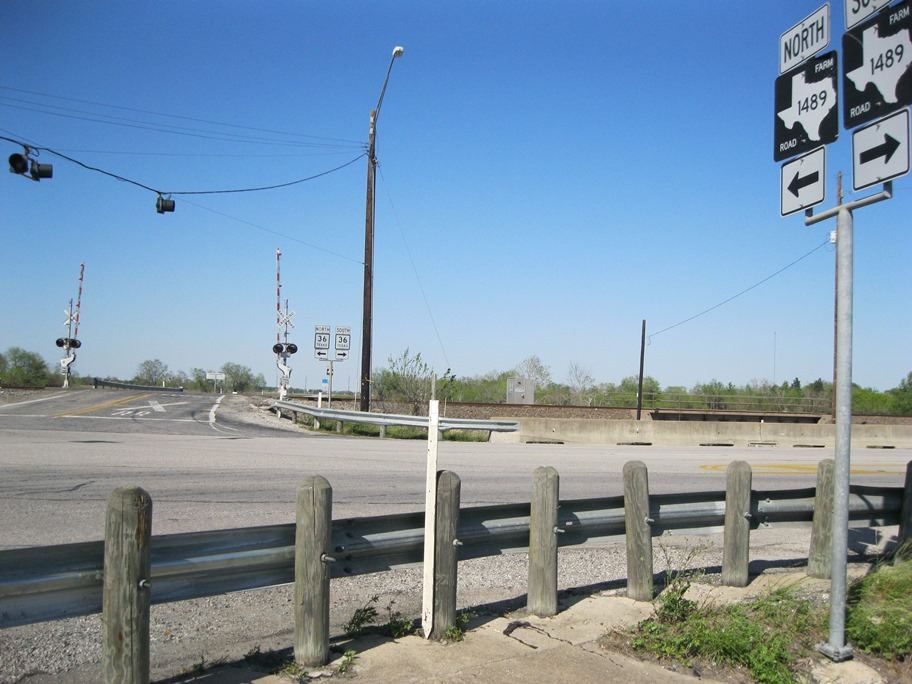
Hwy 36 and FM 1489 intersection

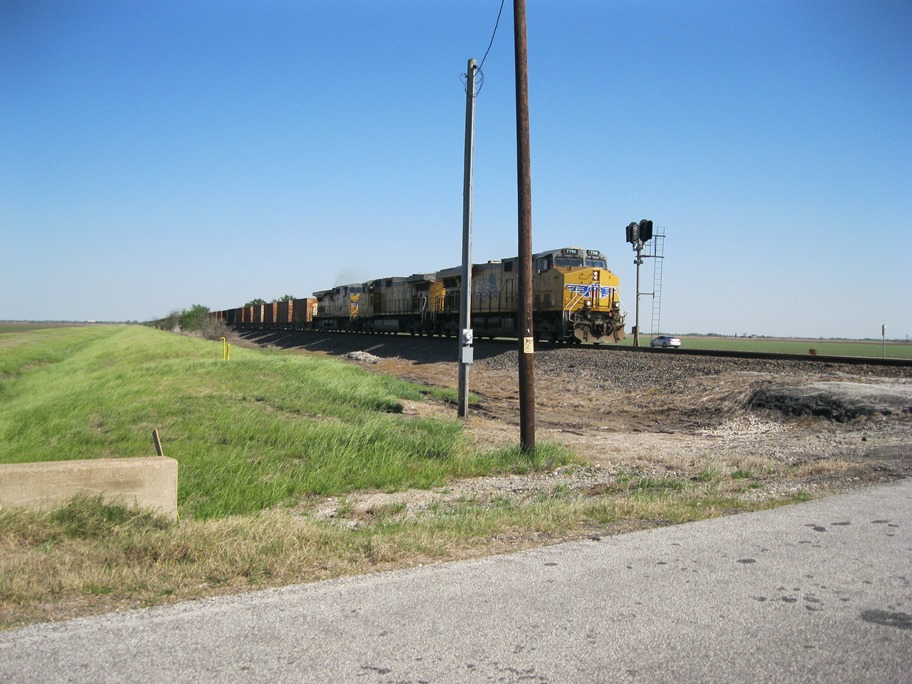
Union Pacific freight at Long Lane

== Demographics ==
Historical population
Census	Pop.	Note	%±
1980	408		—
1990	373		−8.6%
2000	408		9.4%
2010	352		−13.7%
2020	313		−11.1%
U.S. Decennial Census; 2020 Census

=== Racial and ethnic composition ===
Orchard city, Texas – Racial and ethnic composition Note: the US Census treats Hispanic/Latino as an ethnic category. This table excludes Latinos from the racial categories and assigns them to a separate category. Hispanics/Latinos may be of any race.
Race / Ethnicity (NH = Non-Hispanic)	Pop 2000	Pop 2010	Pop 2020	% 2000	% 2010	% 2020
White alone (NH)	278	205	151	68.14%	58.24%	48.24%
Black or African American alone (NH)	31	15	12	7.60%	4.26%	3.83%
Native American or Alaska Native alone (NH)	1	1	2	0.25%	0.28%	0.64%
Asian alone (NH)	0	1	2	0.00%	0.28%	0.64%
Native Hawaiian or Pacific Islander alone (NH)	0	0	0	0.00%	0.00%	0.00%
Other race alone (NH)	3	0	0	0.74%	0.00%	0.00%
Mixed race or Multiracial (NH)	3	2	1	0.74%	0.57%	0.32%
Hispanic or Latino (any race)	92	128	145	22.55%	36.36%	46.33%
Total	408	352	313	100.00%	100.00%	100.00%

=== 2020 census ===
As of the 2020 census, Orchard had a population of 313. The median age was 48.2 years. 14.7% of residents were under the age of 18 and 21.1% of residents were 65 years of age or older. For every 100 females there were 107.3 males, and for every 100 females age 18 and over there were 107.0 males age 18 and over.

0.0% of residents lived in urban areas, while 100.0% lived in rural areas.

There were 120 households in Orchard, of which 31.7% had children under the age of 18 living in them. Of all households, 53.3% were married-couple households, 16.7% were households with a male householder and no spouse or partner present, and 21.7% were households with a female householder and no spouse or partner present. About 19.1% of all households were made up of individuals and 5.9% had someone living alone who was 65 years of age or older.

There were 131 housing units, of which 8.4% were vacant. The homeowner vacancy rate was 0.0% and the rental vacancy rate was 0.0%.

Racial composition as of the 2020 census
Race	Number	Percent
White	180	57.5%
Black or African American	14	4.5%
American Indian and Alaska Native	6	1.9%
Asian	2	0.6%
Native Hawaiian and Other Pacific Islander	0	0.0%
Some other race	64	20.4%
Two or more races	47	15.0%
Hispanic or Latino (of any race)	145	46.3%

=== 2000 census ===
As of the census of 2000, there were 408 people, 147 households, and 110 families residing in the city. The population density was 1,078.9 inhabitants per square mile (416.6/km^{2}). There were 156 housing units at an average density of 412.5 per square mile (159.3/km^{2}). The racial makeup of the city was 76.47% White, 8.09% African American, 1.47% Native American, 12.50% from other races, and 1.47% from two or more races. Hispanic or Latino of any national origin were 22.55% of the population.

There were 147 households, out of which 39.5% had children under the age of 18 living with them, 61.2% were married couples living together, 8.2% had a female householder with no husband present, and 24.5% were non-families. 21.1% of all households were made up of individuals, and 8.8% had someone living alone who was 65 years of age or older. The average household size was 2.78 and the average family size was 3.26.

In the city, the population was spread out, with 28.4% under the age of 18, 11.5% from 18 to 24, 31.1% from 25 to 44, 20.1% from 45 to 64, and 8.8% who were 65 years of age or older. The median age was 33 years. For every 100 females, there were 103.0 males. For every 100 females age 18 and over, there were 102.8 males.

The median income for a household in the city was $47,000, and the median income for a family was $59,063. Males had a median income of $40,089 versus $27,396 for females. The per capita income for the city was $21,329. About 7.3% of families and 8.9% of the population were below the poverty line, including 9.8% of those under age 18 and 17.1% of those age 65 or over.

== Government and infrastructure ==
The United States Postal Service operates the Orchard Post Office at 218 Missouri Street.

Fort Bend County does not have a hospital district. OakBend Medical Center serves as the county's charity hospital which the county contracts with.

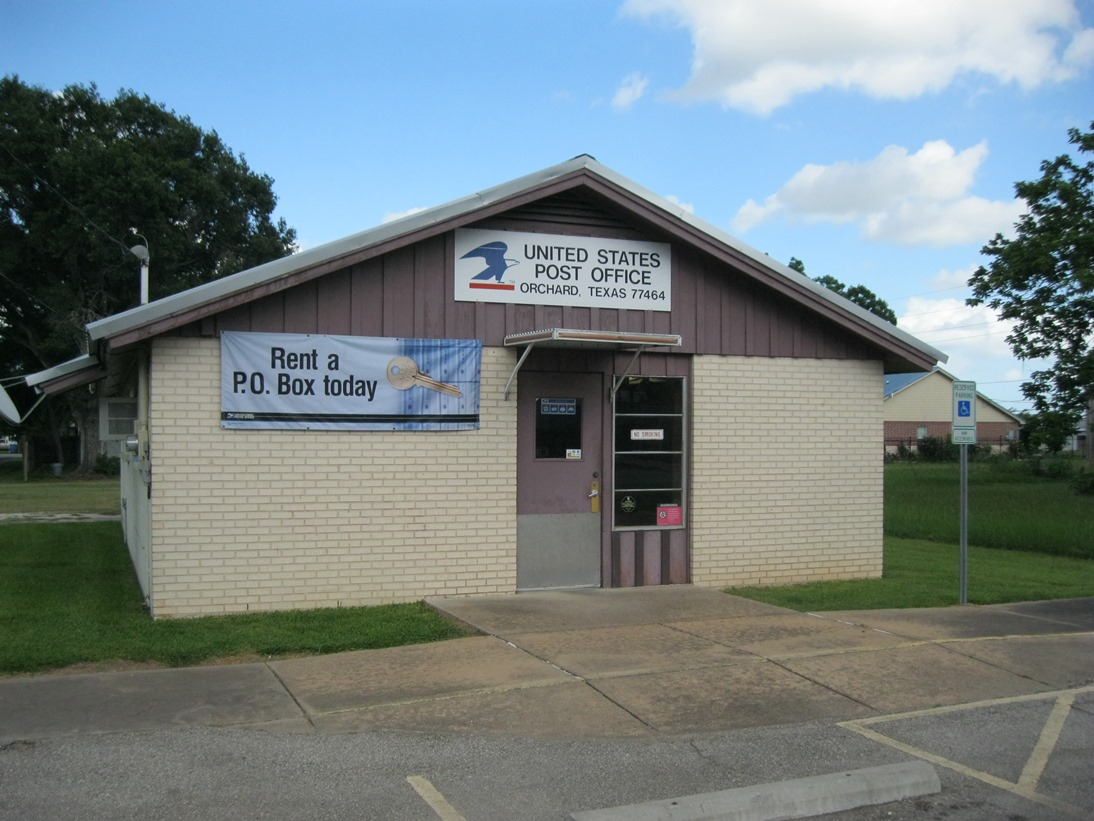
US Post Office on Missouri Street

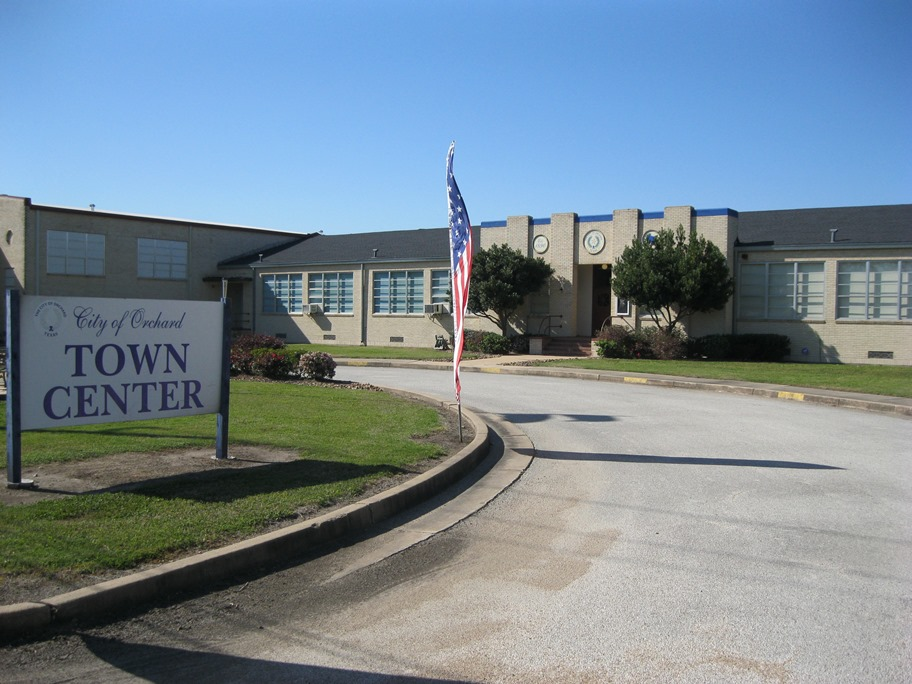
Orchard Town Center on Kibler Road

== Education ==
Orchard is served by the Brazos Independent School District (formerly Wallis-Orchard Independent School District). Students attend Brazos Elementary School (in the Orchard city limits), Brazos Middle School, and Brazos High School.

The designated community college for Brazos ISD is Wharton County Junior College (the legislation still states "Wallis-Orchard").

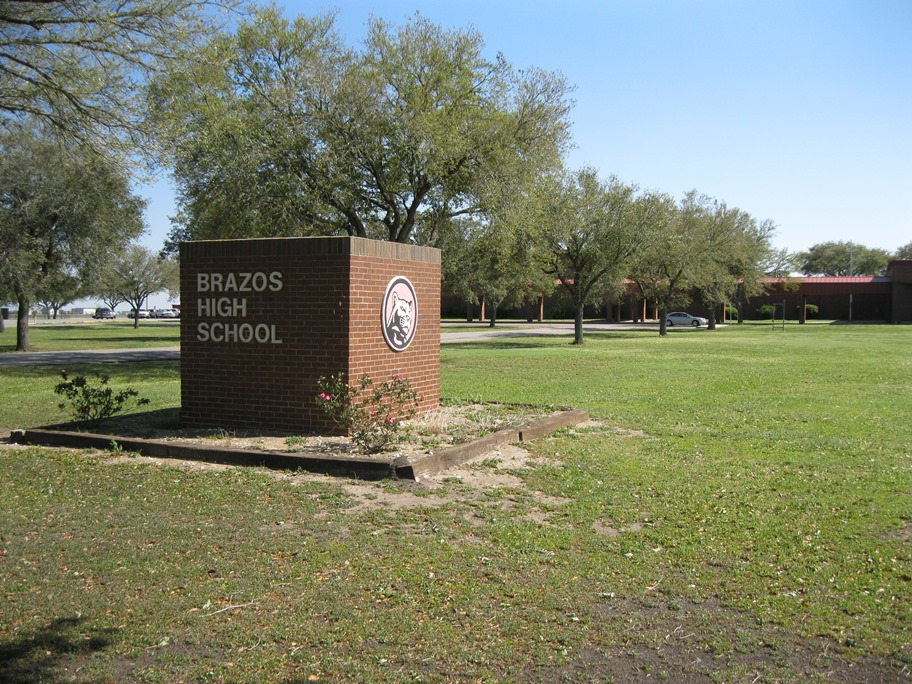
Brazos High School, Hwy 36 in Wallis

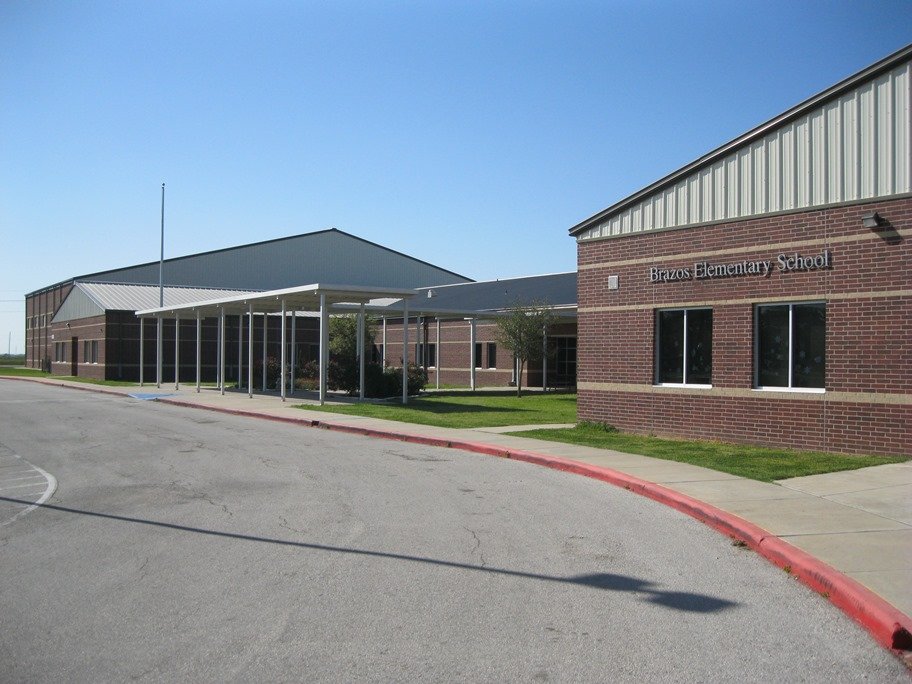
Brazos Elementary School in Orchard
