= Farm to Market Road 1952 =

Road in Texas, United States

Farm to Market Road 1952

Route information
- Maintained by TxDOT
- Length: 9.544 mi (15.360 km)
- Existed: April 24, 1953–present

Major junctions
- South end: US 90 Alt. at Tavener
- FM 1489
- North end: SH 36 at Wallis

Location
- Country: United States
- State: Texas
- Counties: Austin, Fort Bend

Highway system
- Highways in Texas; Interstate; US; State; Former; Toll; Loops; Spurs; FM/RM; Park; Rec
← FM 1951	→ FM 1953

Farm to Market Road 1952 (FM 1952) is a state highway in the U.S. state of Texas. The highway begins at U.S. Route 90 Alternate (US 90 Alt.) at Tavener in Fort Bend County and goes north, then west, then north again to State Highway 36 (SH 36) at Wallis in Austin County. The two-lane highway is also named Tavener Road.

== Route description ==
FM 1952 begins at a stop sign at US 90 Alt. in Tavener, crosses the Union Pacific Railroad tracks and goes north 2.1 miles (3.4 km). At this location, FM 1489 forks to the right while FM 1952 forks to the left into a 90-degree turn to the west. The highway continues due west for about 2.0 miles (3.2 km) then it curves to the northeast and back to the west for a distance of 0.4 miles (0.6 km). FM 1952 runs west for about 1.5 miles (2.4 km) then begins a 90-degree bend to the north that takes up 0.3 miles (0.5 km). After the curve, FM 1952 goes north for 3.0 miles (4.8 km), passing the Guardian Angel Cemetery on the left. The road then turns slightly to the northeast for the final 0.4 miles (0.6 km) before ending at a stop sign at SH 36 in the eastern part of Wallis. The extension of the road to the north beyond the BNSF Railway crossing is called Tenth Street.

== History ==
FM 1952 was originally authorized on January 18, 1952 to begin at FM 39 about 1.0 mile (1.6 km) southeast of Farrar in Limestone County and run southward to the Leon County line. On April 7, 1953, FM 1952 was canceled and its right-of-way was transferred to FM 1512. The designation of the current FM 1952 was made on April 24, 1953. The highway was to start at SH 36 in Wallis and go south 1.8 miles (2.9 km) to the Fort Bend County line. On September 21, 1955, FM 1952 was extended approximately 8.0 miles (12.9 km) south, east and south to US 90 Alt. at Tavener.

== Major intersections ==
County	Location	mi	km	Destinations	Notes
Fort Bend	Tavener	0.0	0.0	US 90 Alt.	Southern terminus of FM 1952
Fort Bend		2.1	3.4	FM 1489	
Austin	Wallis	9.5	15.3	SH 36	Northern terminus of FM 1952
1.000 mi = 1.609 km; 1.000 km = 0.621 mi

== Gallery ==
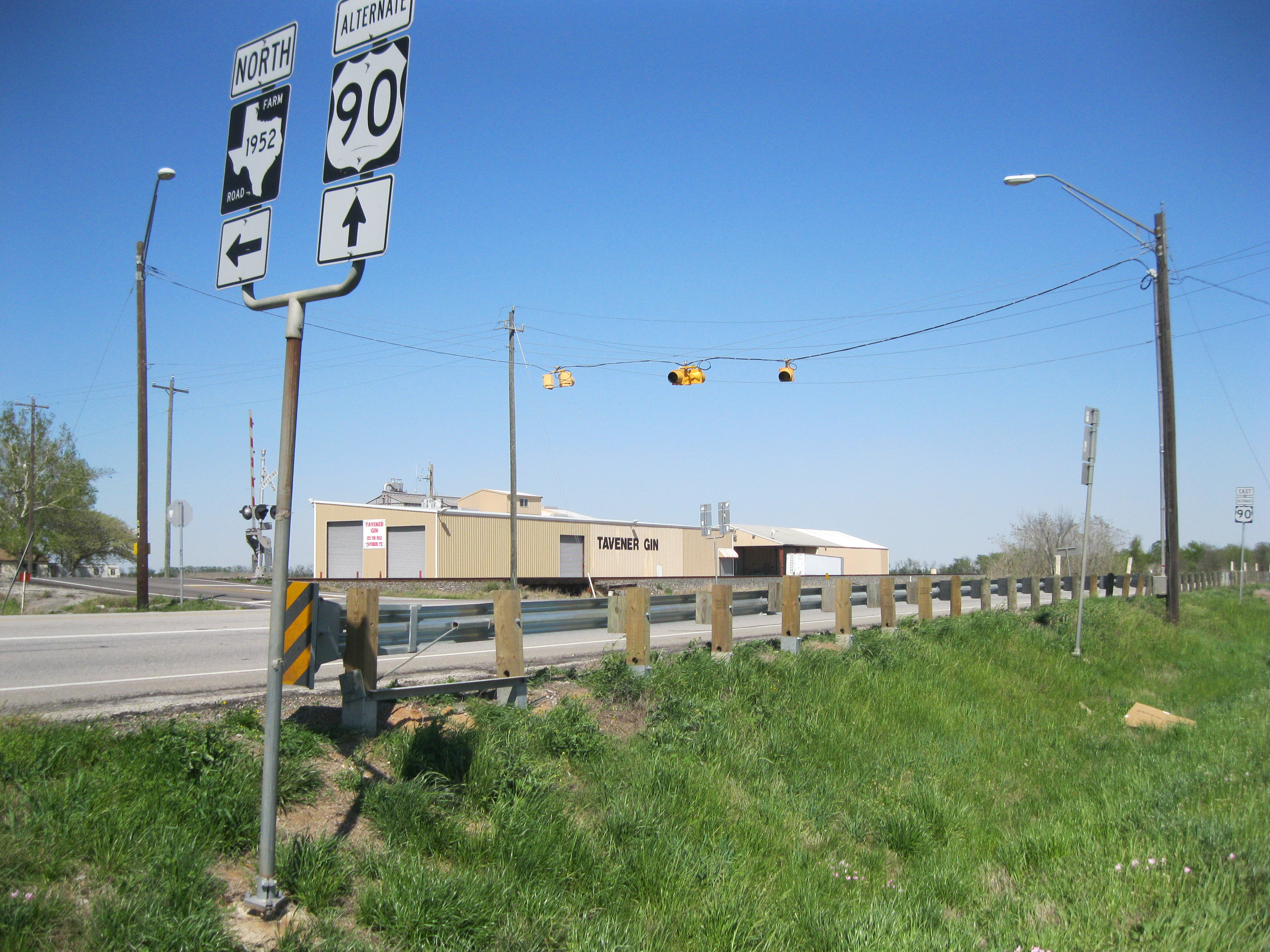
View northeast at intersection of US 90 Alt. and FM 1952

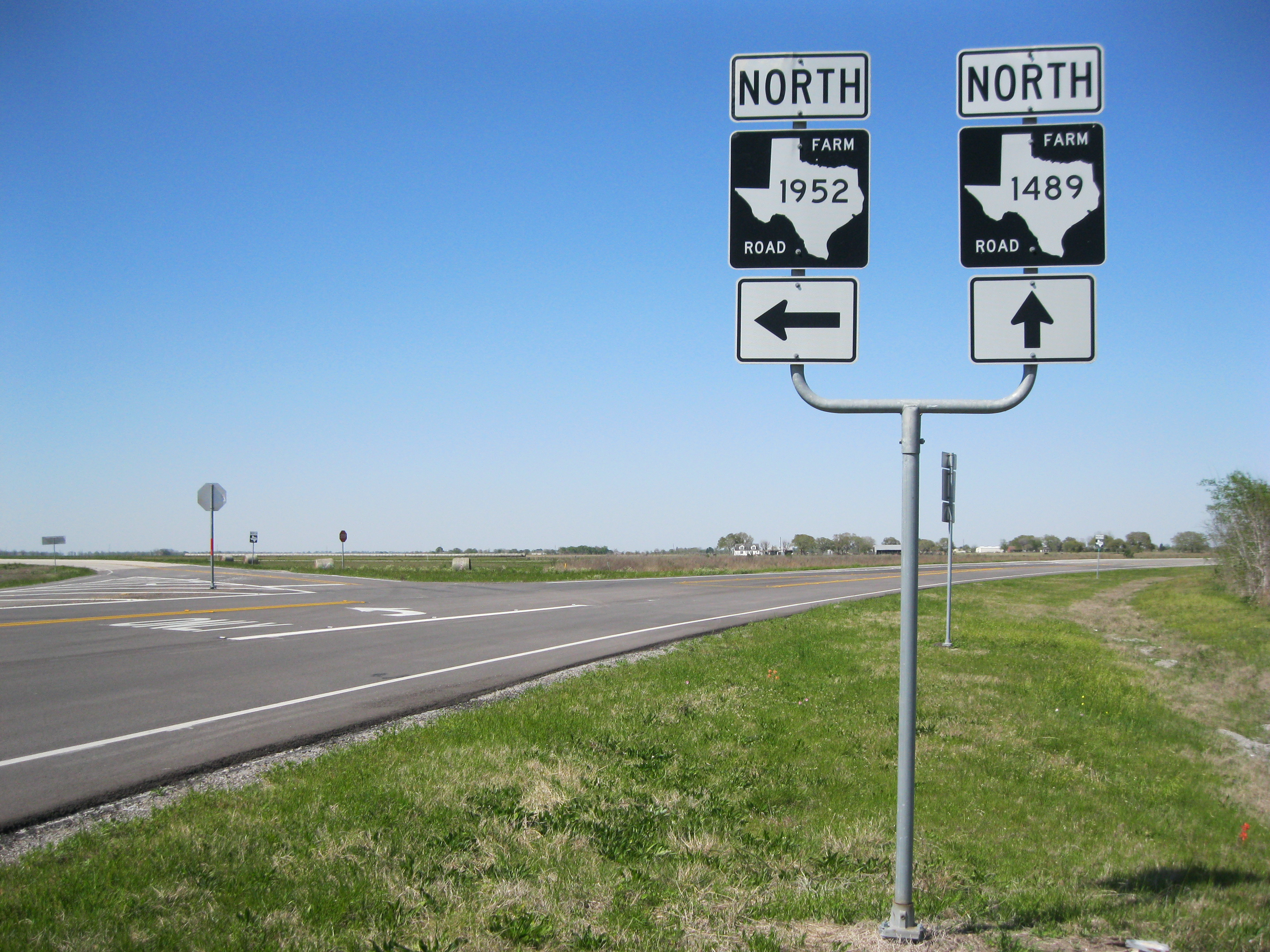
FM 1952 and FM 1489 intersection north of Tavener

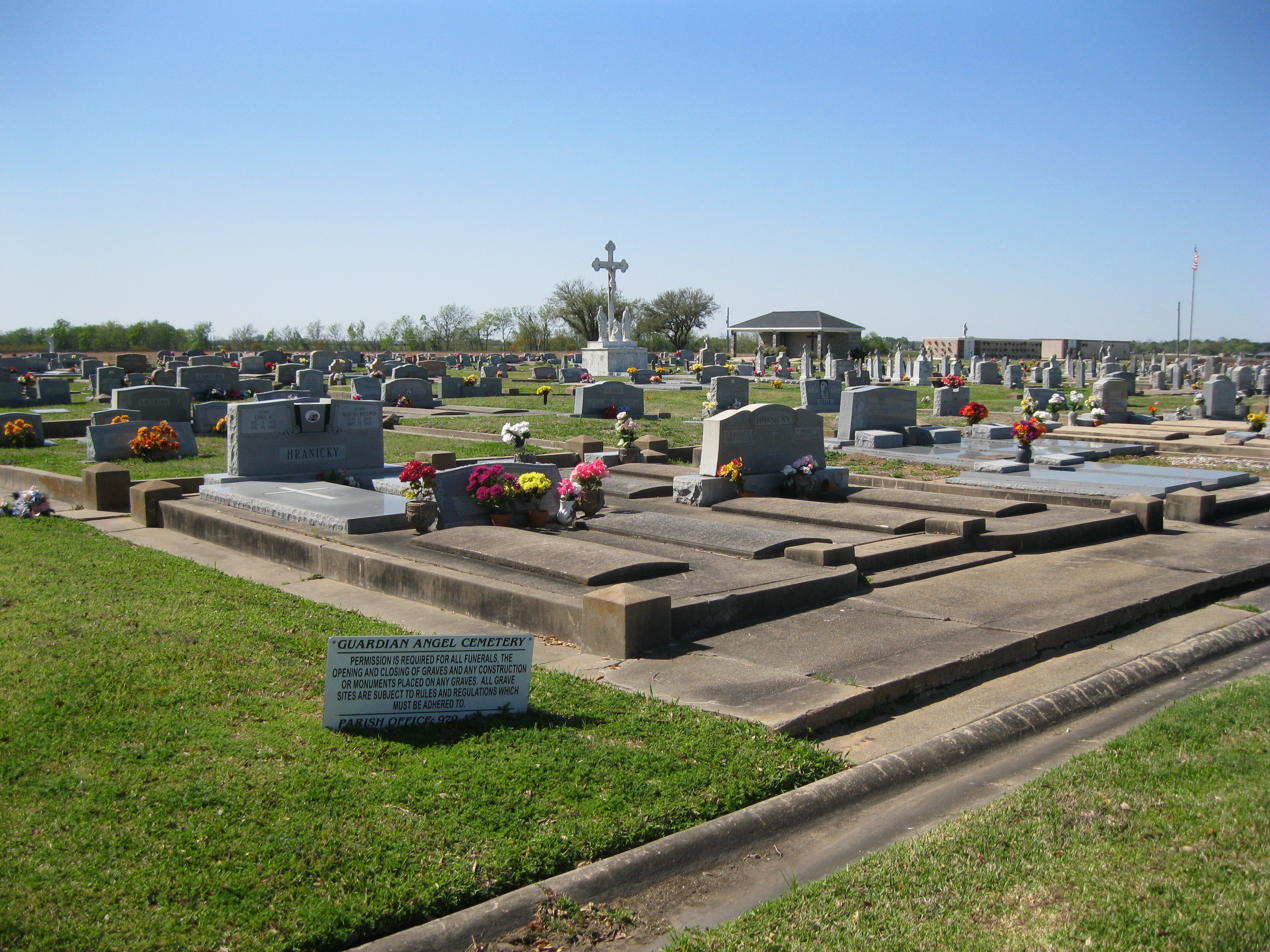
Guardian Angel Cemetery on FM 1952 south of Wallis

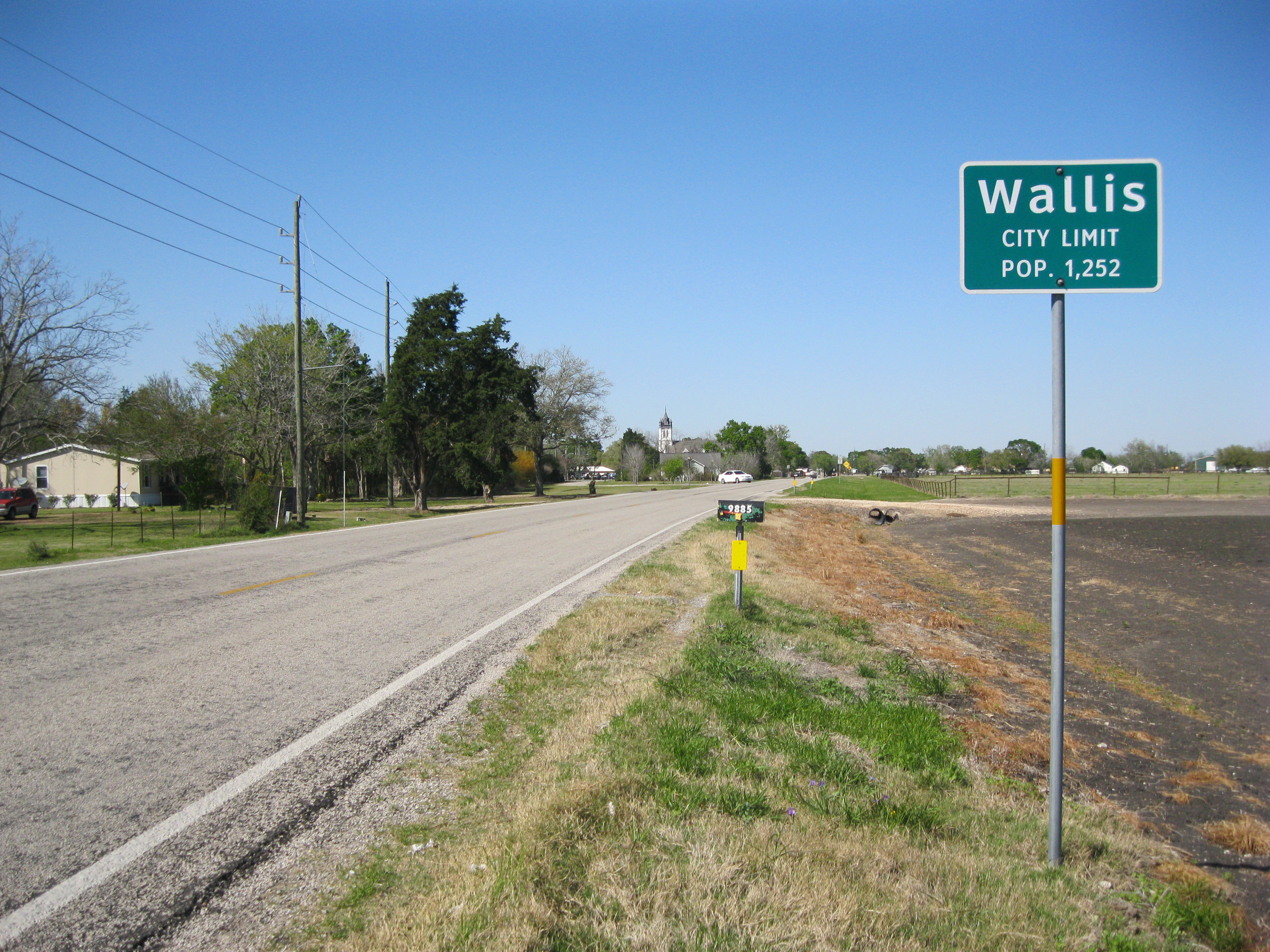
View north on FM 1952 at Wallis city limit

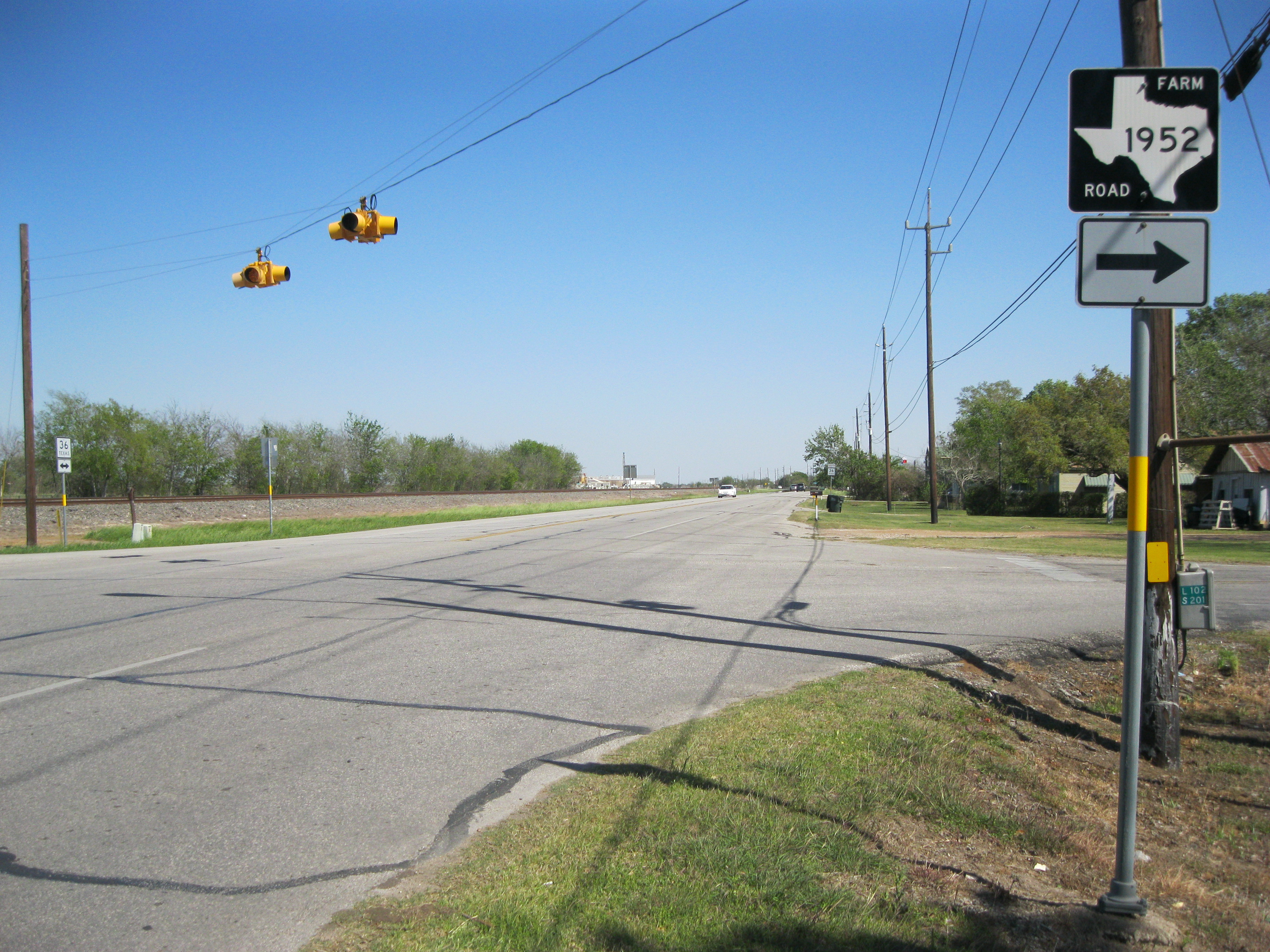
View southeast on Highway 36 at FM 1952 in Wallis
