= Wallis, Texas =

- City
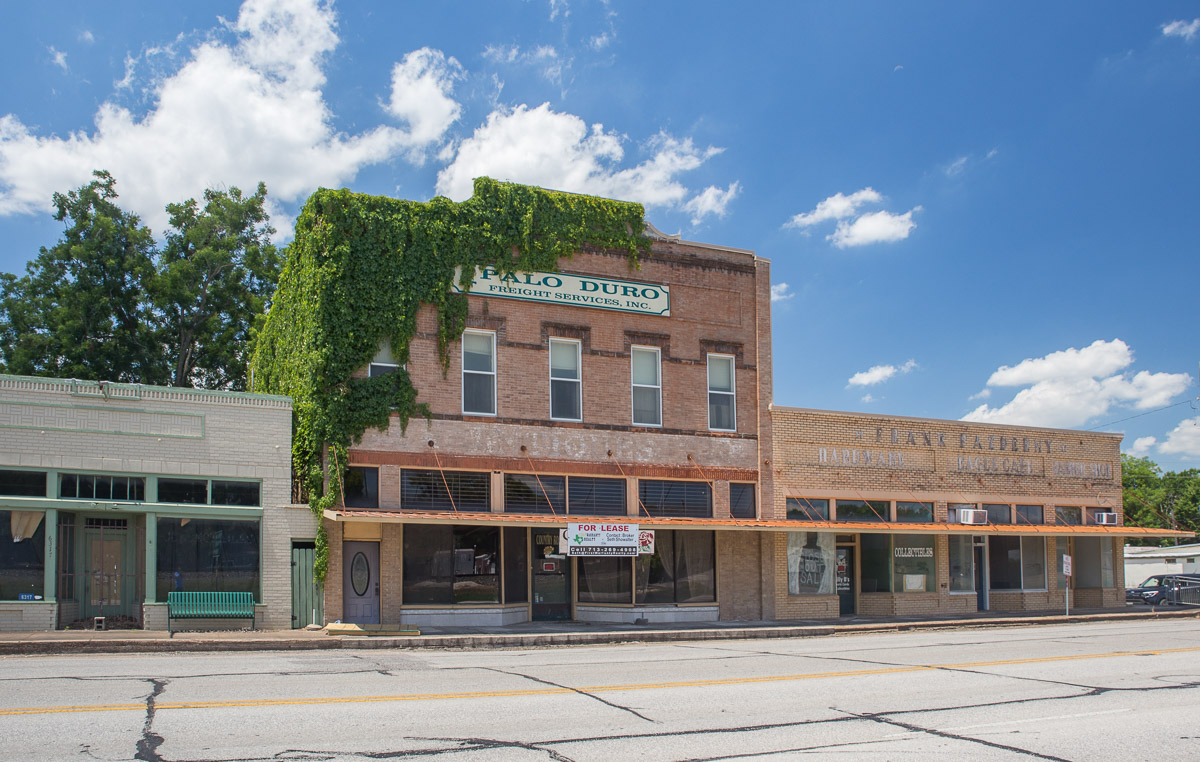
- View of Wallis along Highway 36 in 2020

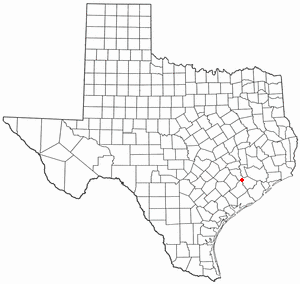
- Location of Wallis, Texas

- Coordinates: 29°37′50″N 96°3′46″W
- Country: United States
- State: Texas
- County: Austin

Area
  - Total: 1.51 sq mi (3.91 km^{2})
  - Land: 1.49 sq mi (3.87 km^{2})
  - Water: 0.015 sq mi (0.04 km^{2})
- Elevation: 128 ft (39 m)

Population (2020)
  - Total: 1,292
  - Density: 871.3/sq mi (336.42/km^{2})
- Time zone: UTC-6 (Central (CST))
  - Summer (DST): UTC-5 (CDT)
- ZIP code: 77485
- Area code: 979
- FIPS code: 48-76240
- GNIS feature ID: 1376626
- Website: www.wallistexas.org

Wallis is a city in far southeastern Austin County, Texas, United States. The city is located along State Highway 36 (SH 36) and the BNSF Railway between Rosenberg and Sealy. The city's population was 1,292 at the 2020 census.

== Geography ==
Wallis is located at 29°37′50″N 96°3′46″W (29.630649, –96.062751). SH 36 heads northwest from Wallis to Sealy in Austin County and east-southeast from Wallis to Rosenberg in Fort Bend County. The BNSF Railway runs parallel with SH 36 on the north side of the highway. State Highway 60 starts in the west part of Wallis and goes south to East Bernard. Farm to Market Road 1093 continues northeast to Simonton in Fort Bend County and west-southwest to Eagle Lake in Colorado County. Farm to Market Road 1952 begins in the east part of Wallis and goes south and east to Tavener in Fort Bend County.

According to the United States Census Bureau, the city has a total area of 1.5 square miles (3.9 km^{2}), of which 0.015 square miles (0.04 km^{2}), or 0.92%, is water.

== History ==
In 1830 the first Anglo-Americans made their homes in the area between the Brazos and San Bernard rivers. When the settlement got a post office in 1873, its name was Bovine Bend. Sometime after 1880, the Gulf, Colorado and Santa Fe Railway was constructed through the community from Galveston to Brenham. At that time, the town was renamed Wallis Station after J. E. Wallis, the director of the railroad. In 1887 the San Antonio and Aransas Pass Railway, being built east toward Houston, reached Wallis. Starting in about 1890, Czech immigrants began moving into the area. By 1904 there were 631 souls living in Wallis. In 1911, the town dropped "Station" from its name to become Wallis. Seven years later its school had 100 students. Between 1925 and 1943 the population grew from 800 to 900. By the latter year the town boasted 39 businesses. After declining to 690 in 1949, the number of inhabitants increased to 1,075 by 1966. A decade later, the city claimed to have a bank, library, and a newspaper, as well as two schools and eight churches. In 1991 there were 1,411 people and 15 commercial establishments. The population declined to 1,311 in 2000 and to 1,252 in 2010. In 2013 the BNSF Railway still operated along the one-time Gulf, Colorado and Santa Fe Railway right-of-way, while the east–west railroad line no longer existed.

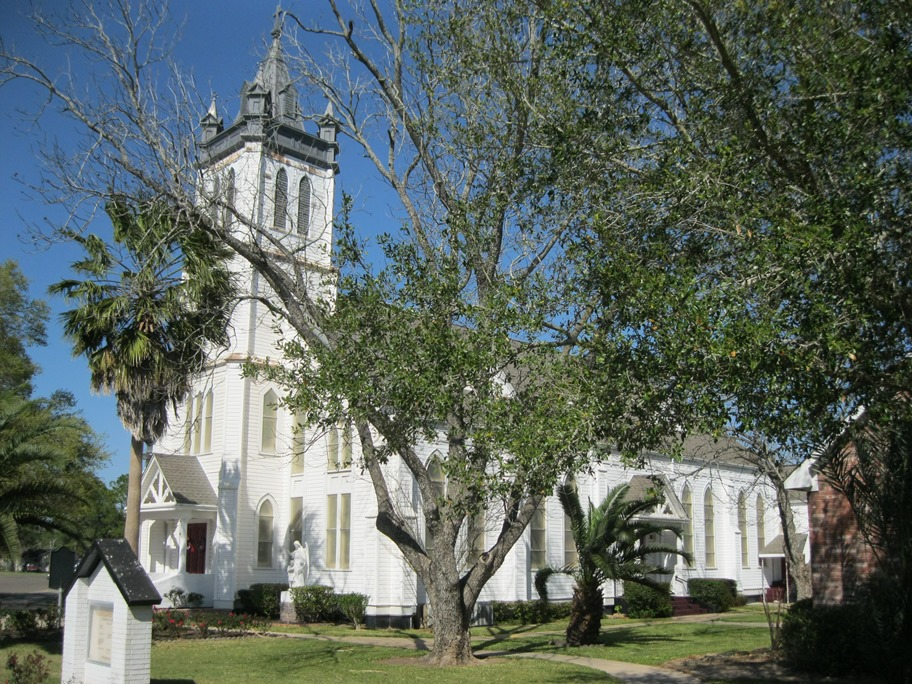
Guardian Angel Catholic Church on Demel Street

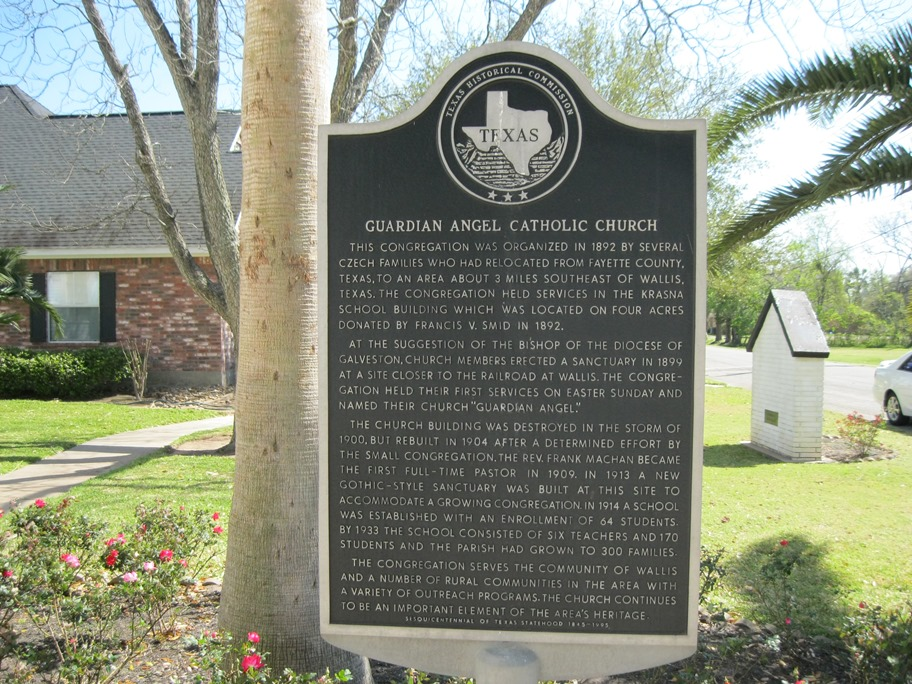
Historical marker at Guardian Angel Catholic Church

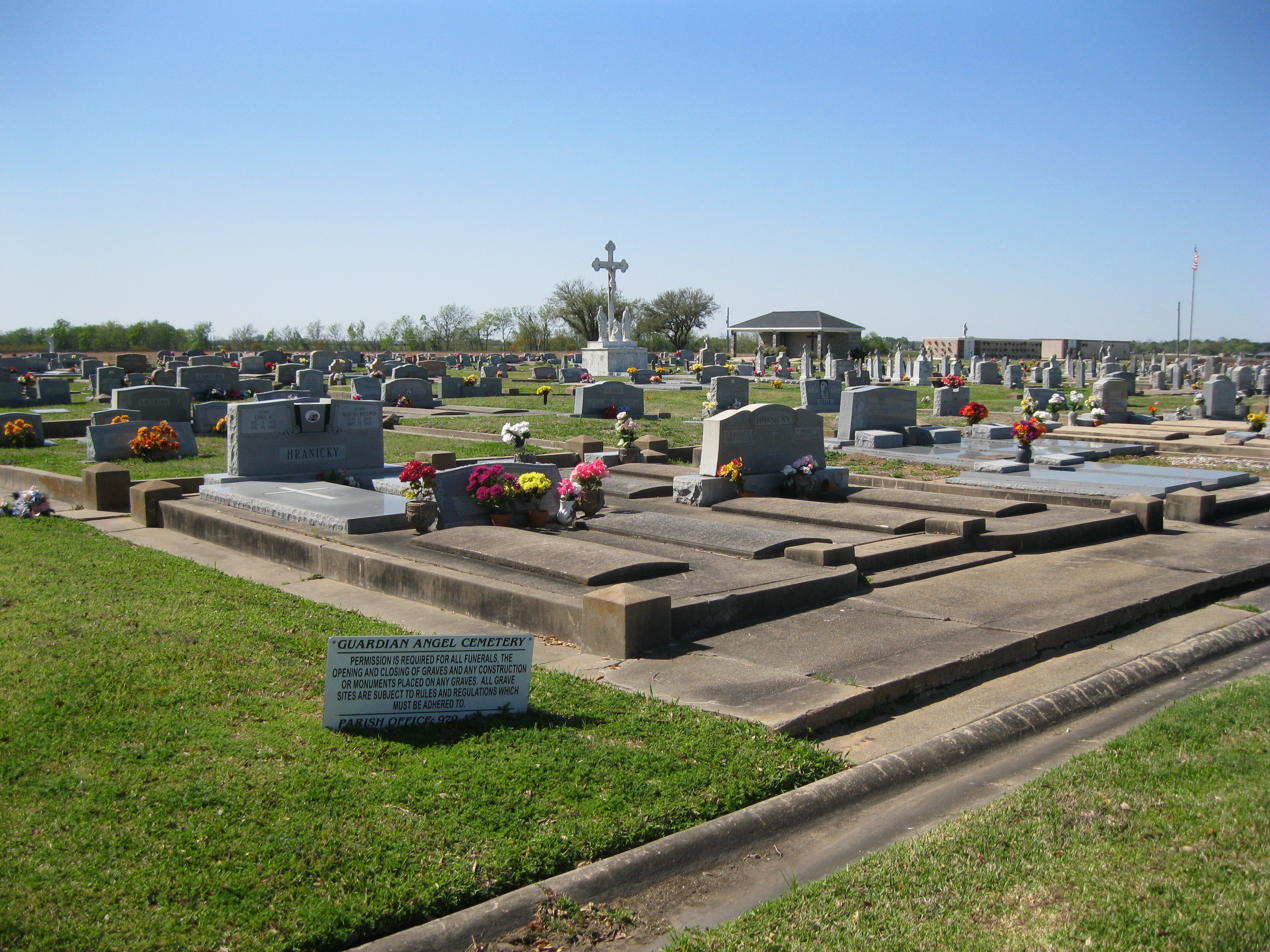
Guardian Angel Cemetery on FM 1952 south of Wallis

== Government and infrastructure ==
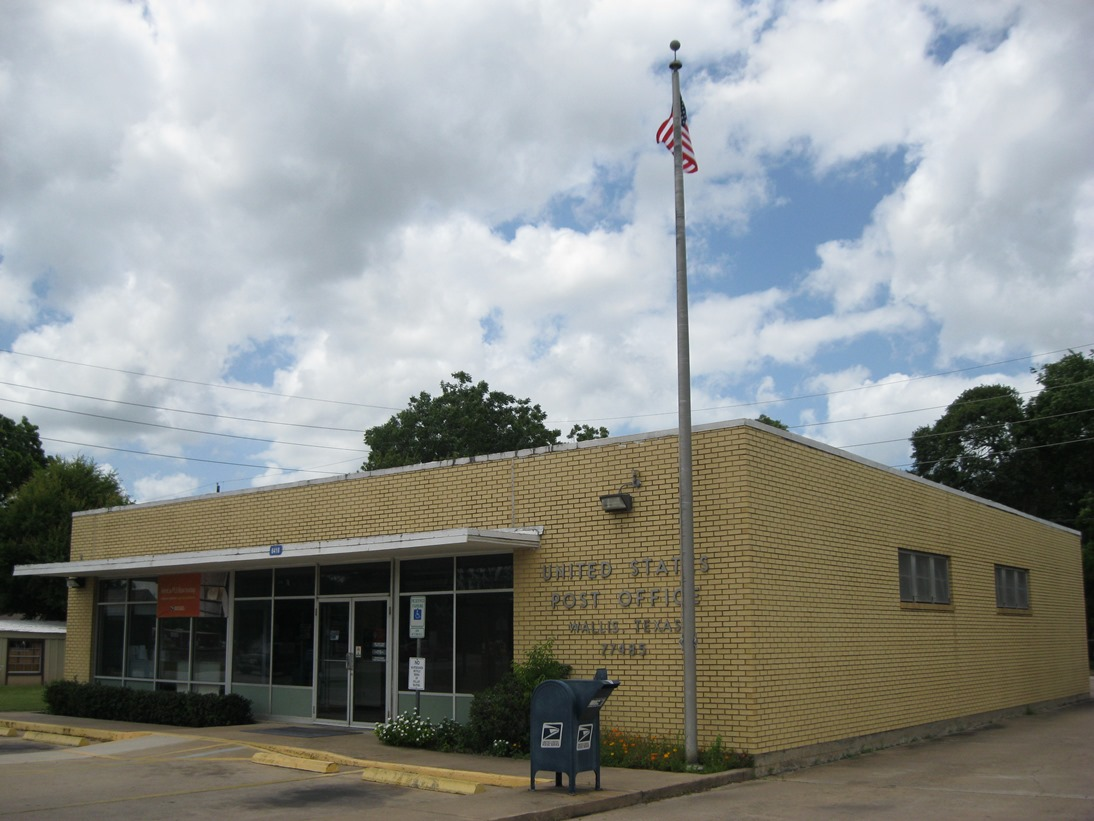
US Post Office on Railroad St near FM 1093

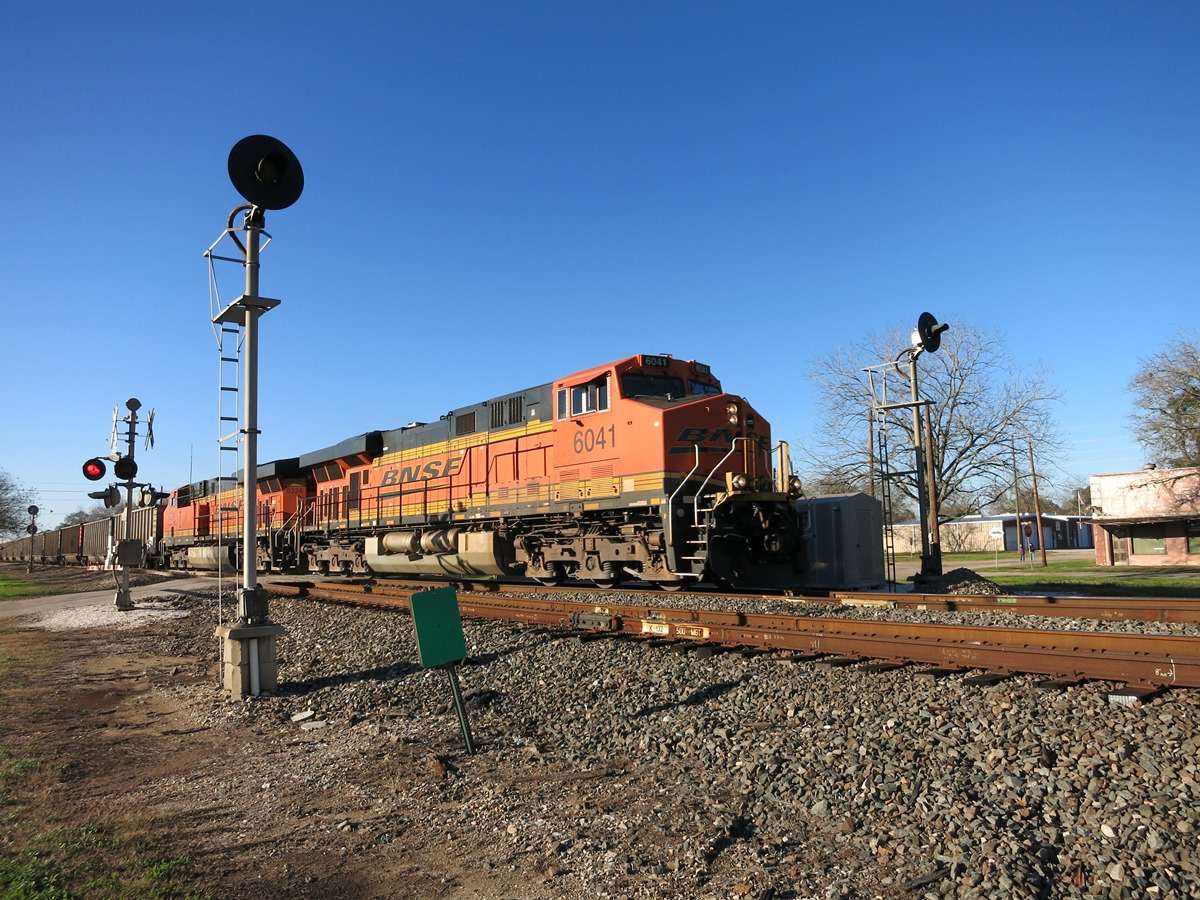
BNSF 6041 pulls an eastbound freight at 2nd Street

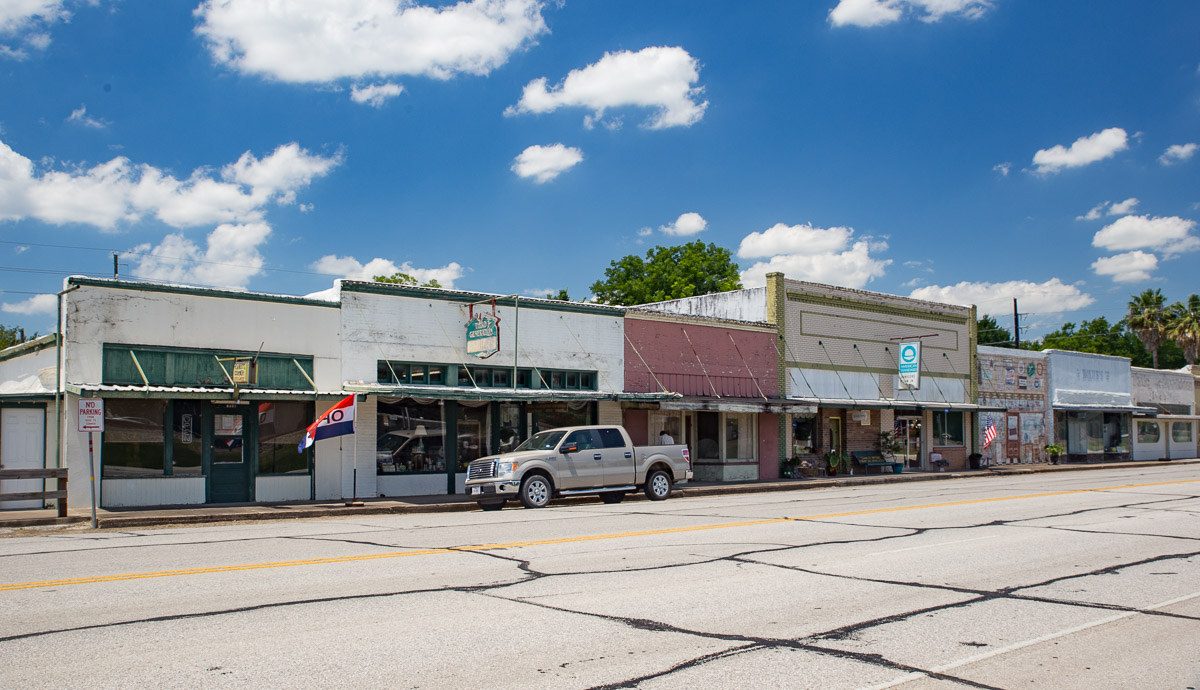
Stores in Wallis, Texas

== Demographics ==
Historical population
Census	Pop.	Note	%±
1880	29		—
1980	1,138		—
1990	1,001		−12.0%
2000	1,172		17.1%
2010	1,252		6.8%
2020	1,292		3.2%
U.S. Decennial Census

=== 2020 census ===
As of the 2020 census, Wallis had a population of 1,292. The median age was 38.9 years; 23.8% of residents were under the age of 18 and 17.4% of residents were 65 years of age or older. For every 100 females there were 91.7 males, and for every 100 females age 18 and over there were 93.1 males age 18 and over.

0.0% of residents lived in urban areas, while 100.0% lived in rural areas.

There were 495 households in Wallis, of which 31.5% had children under the age of 18 living in them. Of all households, 47.7% were married-couple households, 16.4% were households with a male householder and no spouse or partner present, and 28.1% were households with a female householder and no spouse or partner present. About 29.5% of all households were made up of individuals and 13.3% had someone living alone who was 65 years of age or older.

There were 578 housing units, of which 14.4% were vacant. The homeowner vacancy rate was 2.8% and the rental vacancy rate was 12.5%.

Racial composition as of the 2020 census
Race	Number	Percent
White	782	60.5%
Black or African American	162	12.5%
American Indian and Alaska Native	10	0.8%
Asian	7	0.5%
Native Hawaiian and Other Pacific Islander	0	0.0%
Some other race	91	7.0%
Two or more races	240	18.6%
Hispanic or Latino (of any race)	423	32.7%

=== 2000 census ===
As of the 2000 census, there were 1,172 people, 422 households, and 314 families residing in the city. The population density was 767.7 inhabitants per square mile (296.4/km^{2}). There were 455 housing units at an average density of 298.0 per square mile (115.1/km^{2}). The racial makeup of the city was 71.50% White, 13.74% African American, 0.43% Native American, 0.09% Pacific Islander, 10.92% from other races, and 3.33% from two or more races. Hispanic or Latino of any race were 23.38% of the population.

There were 422 households, out of which 35.5% had children under the age of 18 living with them, 58.8% were married couples living together, 11.8% had a female householder with no husband present, and 25.4% were non-families. 21.3% of all households were made up of individuals, and 12.1% had someone living alone who was 65 years of age or older. The average household size was 2.77 and the average family size was 3.23.

In the city, the population was spread out, with 28.1% under the age of 18, 9.2% from 18 to 24, 27.6% from 25 to 44, 21.8% from 45 to 64, and 13.2% who were 65 years of age or older. The median age was 35 years. For every 100 females, there were 95.7 males. For every 100 females age 18 and over, there were 84.5 males.

The median income for a household in the city was $36,328, and the median income for a family was $40,000. Males had a median income of $30,481 versus $20,664 for females. The per capita income for the city was $16,877. About 6.4% of families and 10.8% of the population were below the poverty line, including 13.3% of those under age 18 and 15.6% of those age 65 or over.

The current mayor of Wallis is Jerry Delso, elected May 12, 2012, by a vote of 171–57 over incumbent Carolyn Kennedy.

== Education ==
Wallis is served by the Brazos Independent School District (formerly Wallis-Orchard Independent School District) and home to the Brazos High School Cougars.

The designated community college for Brazos ISD is Wharton County Junior College (the legislation still states "Wallis-Orchard").

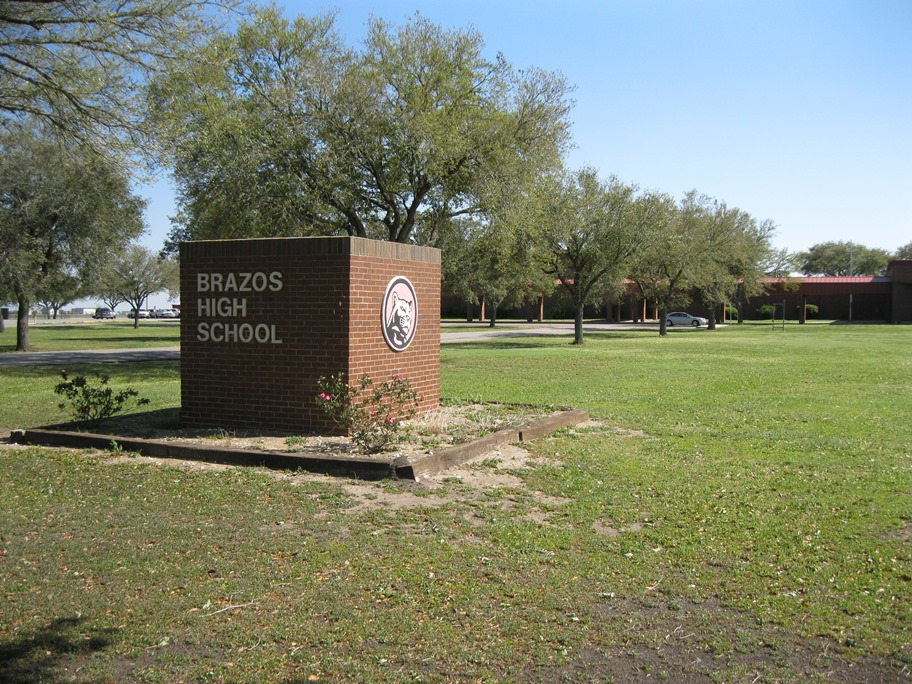
Brazos High School on Hwy. 36 in Wallis

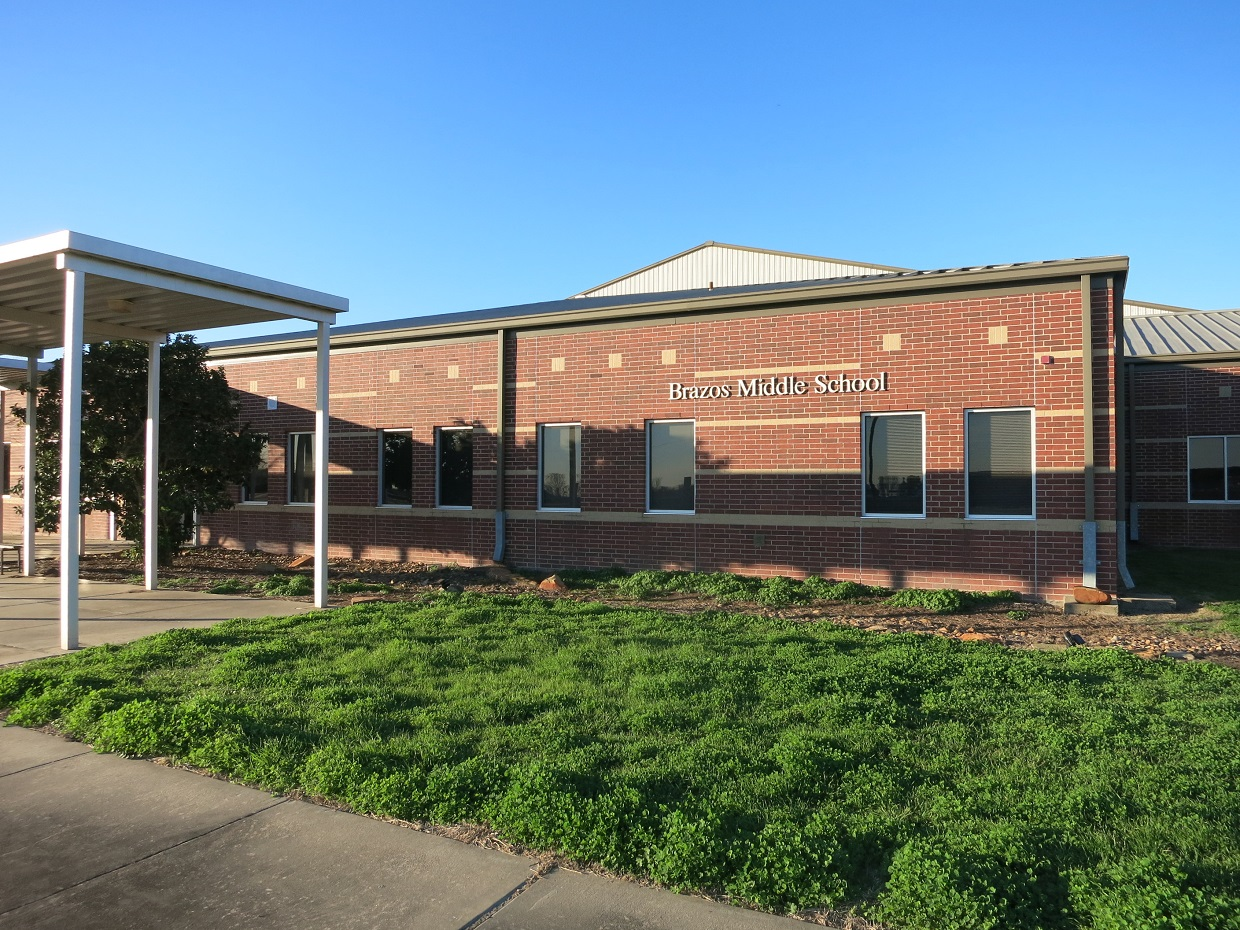
Brazos Middle School behind H.S. in Wallis

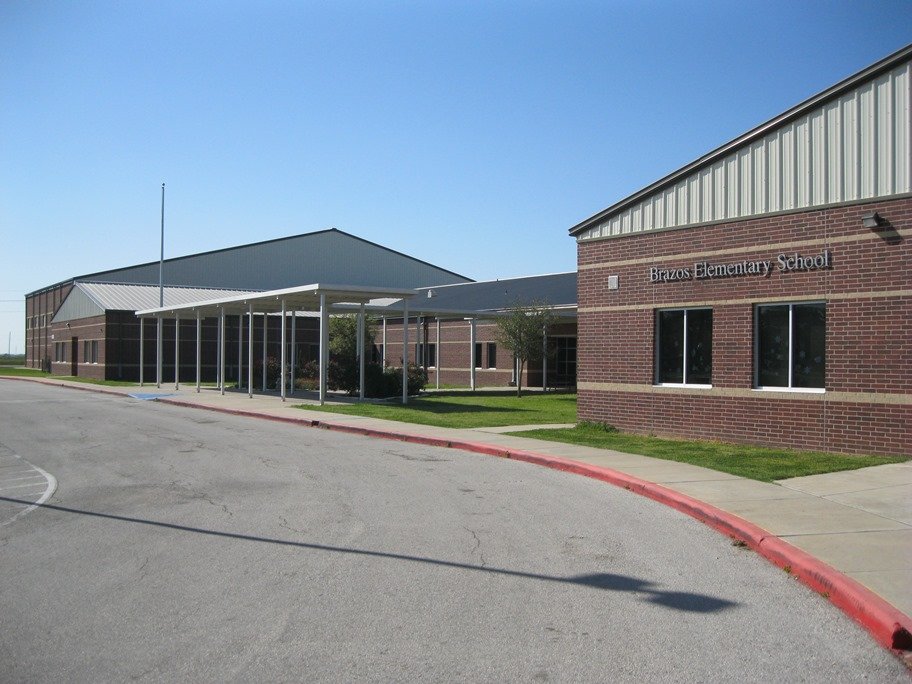
Brazos Elementary School in Orchard

== Media ==
Wallis is one of the key towns featured in the 2009 documentary The Heart of Texas.

The opening scene of the movie Urban Cowboy was filmed at a farm just outside Wallis on FM 1952.

== See also ==
- Allens Creek Nuclear Power Plant
