= Brazos High School =

Public school in Texas, United States

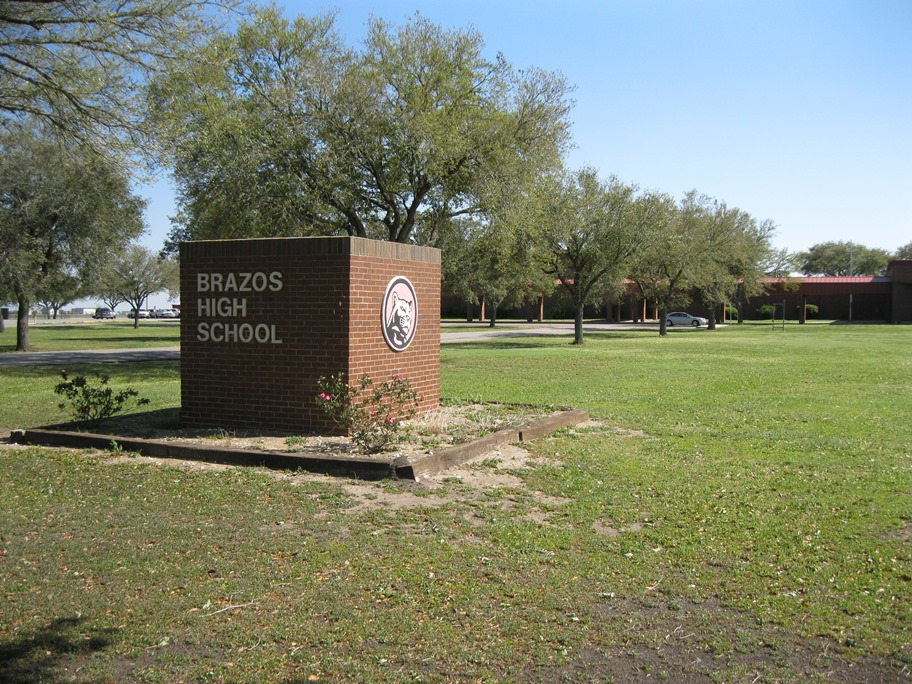
- Grounds of the school

Location
- 16621 Highway 36 South; Wallis, Austin County, Texas 77485-0458; United States; 29.6191°N 96.0357°W

Information
- School type: Public, high school
- Motto: Excellence in Education
- Locale: Rural: Distant
- School district: Brazos ISD
- CEEB code: 447340
- NCES School ID: 484447005075
- Principal: Mary McCarthy
- Staff: 22.76 (on an FTE basis)
- Grades: 9–12
- Enrollment: 308 (2023–2024)
- Student to teacher ratio: 13.53
- Colors: Red & Black
- Athletics conference: UIL Class AA
- Mascot: Cougars/Cougarettes
- Website: Brazos High School

Brazos High School is a public high school located in the city of Wallis, Texas. It is a part of the Brazos Independent School District located in central Austin County and classified as a 2A school by the UIL. During 2022–2023, Brazos High School had an enrollment of 287 students and a student to teacher ratio of 12.94. The school received an overall rating of "B" from the Texas Education Agency for the 2024–2025 school year.

== History ==
Brazos High School was created by the merger of Wallis and Orchard in 1974 and for a short time was known as Wallis-Orchard Brazos High School.

== Athletics ==
The Brazos Cougars compete in these sports

- Baseball
- Basketball
- Cross Country
- Football
- Golf
- Powerlifting
- Softball
- Tennis
- Track and Field
- Volleyball

=== State titles ===
- Boys Cross Country
  - 2007(2A)
- Volleyball
  - 1977(1A), 1978(1A), 1979(1A), 1998(2A), 2003(2A)
