= Tavener, Texas =

- Unincorporated community^^
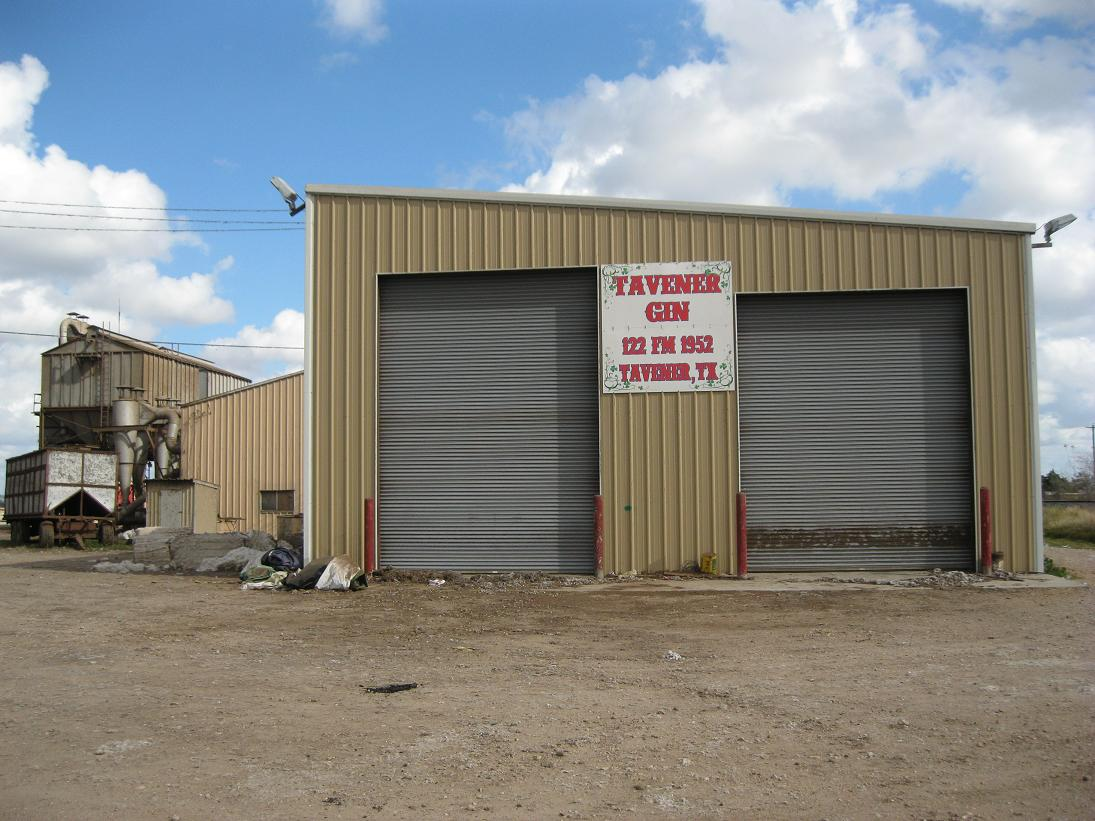
- Tavener cotton gin at US 90A and FM 1952

- Location within Texas Location within the United States
- Coordinates: 29°32′24″N 95°59′21″W
- Country: United States
- State: Texas
- County: Fort Bend
- Elevation: 118 ft (36 m)
- Time zone: UTC-6 (Central (CST))
  - Summer (DST): UTC-5 (CDT)
- ZIP code: 77435
- Area code: 979

Tavener is an unincorporated community in Fort Bend County, Texas, United States. It is a part of the Greater Houston metropolitan area.

== History ==
In 1890, the Texas and New Orleans Railroad added a stop and named it Tavener after Charlie Tavener, an early resident. The community received a post office in 1910. Four years later, the 25-person settlement boasted a lumberyard, general store, and telephone service. Postal service ceased in the 1930s. The community had a population of 50 and four commercial establishments in 1933. Only one business remained in 1945, but the number of residents remained steady. By 1953, only 20 people were recorded as living in the settlement. In 1970, the population was 30 persons. It continued to be listed on county maps in 1987, but there were no population estimates after that.

== Geography ==
Tavener is located 12 mi (19 km) west of Richmond in Fort Bend County on US 90A and Farm to Market Road 1952.

== Education ==
In 1926, Tavener had one school attended by 135 white children and a second segregated school with 28 black children.

Today, the Brazos Independent School District operates schools in the area.

== Gallery ==
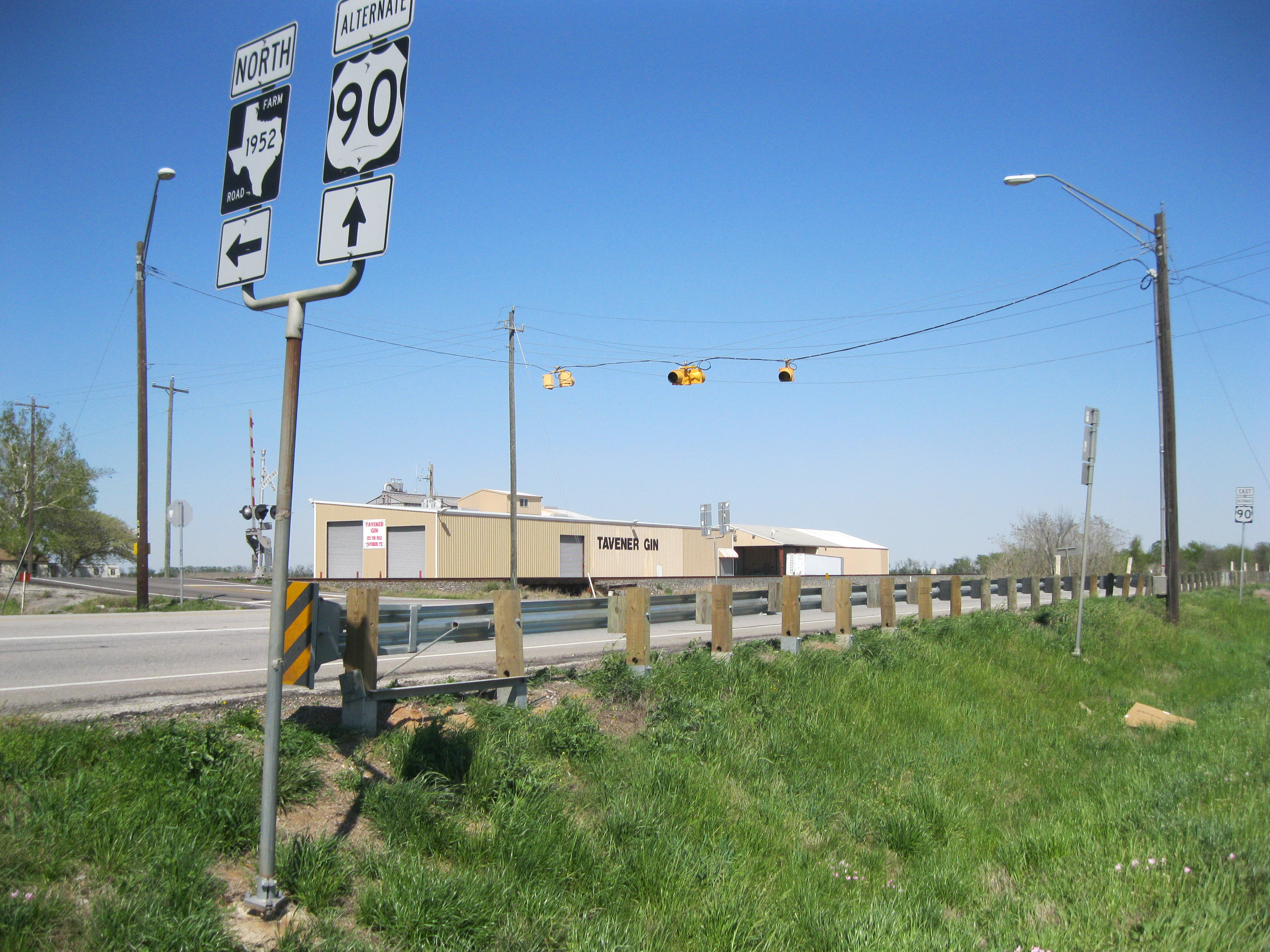
View east at the intersection of US 90A and FM 1952

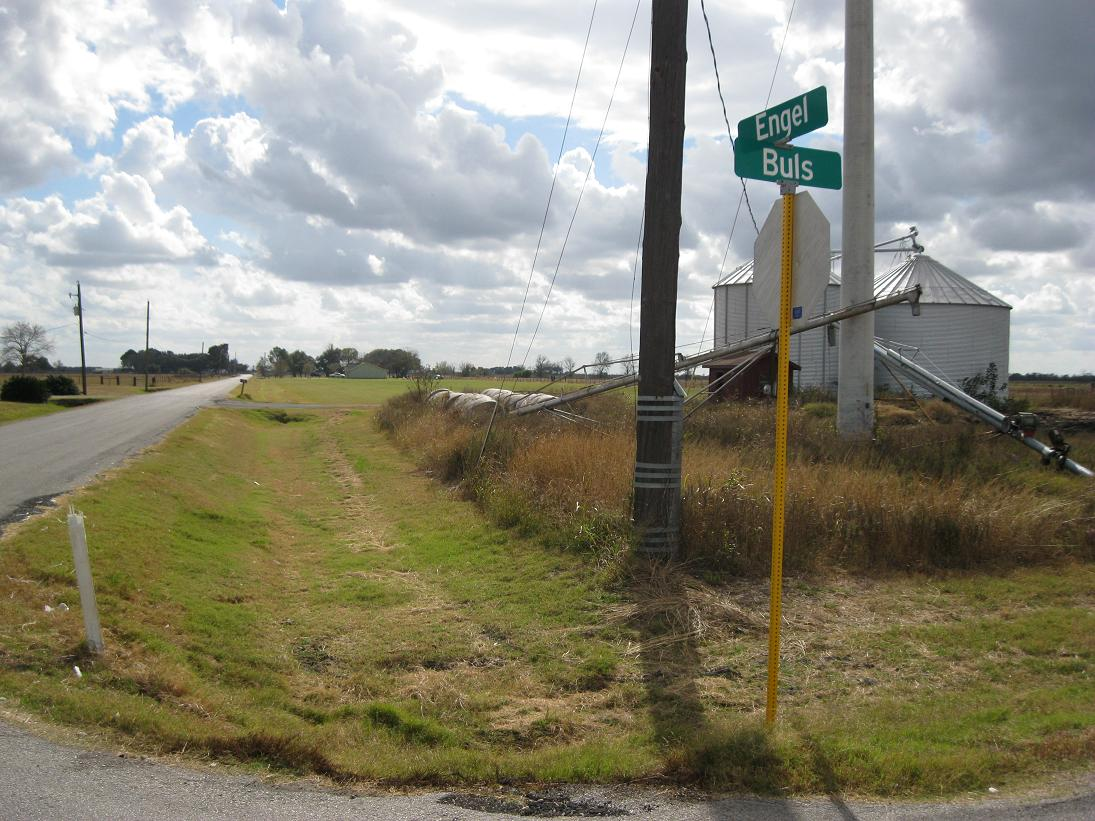
View south from Engel and Buls Roads

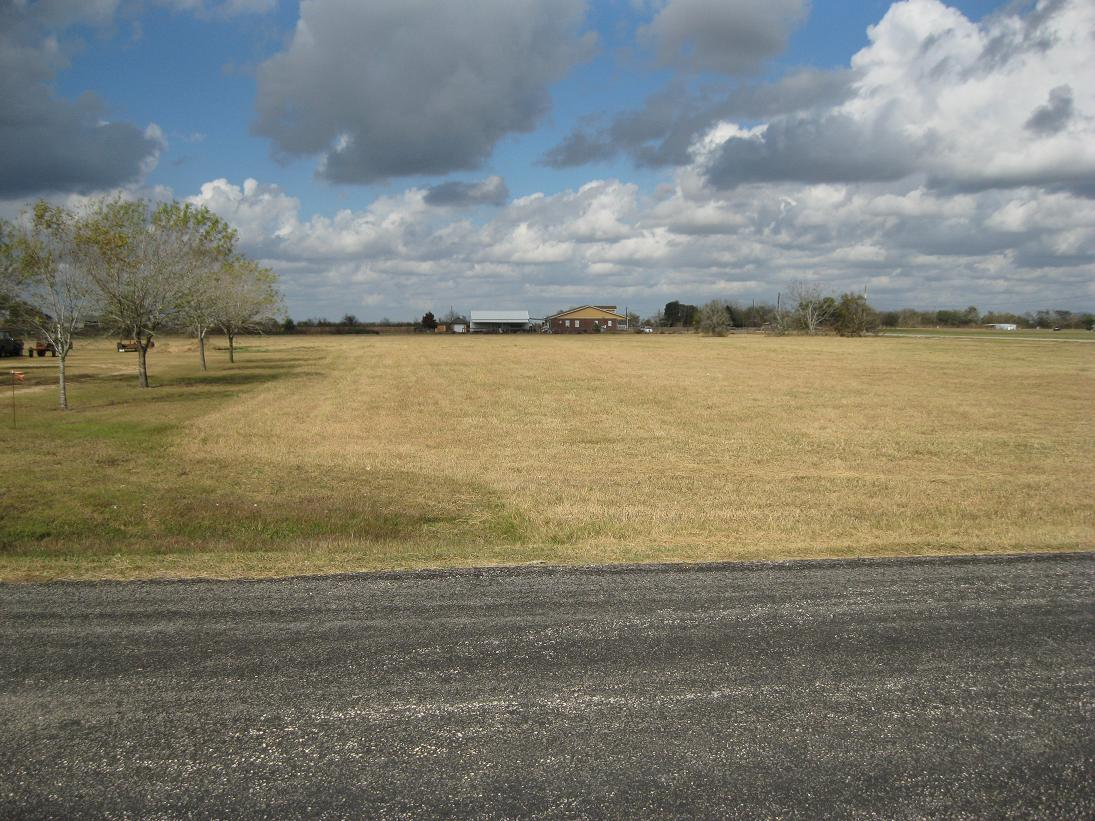
View north from Buls Road toward US 90A

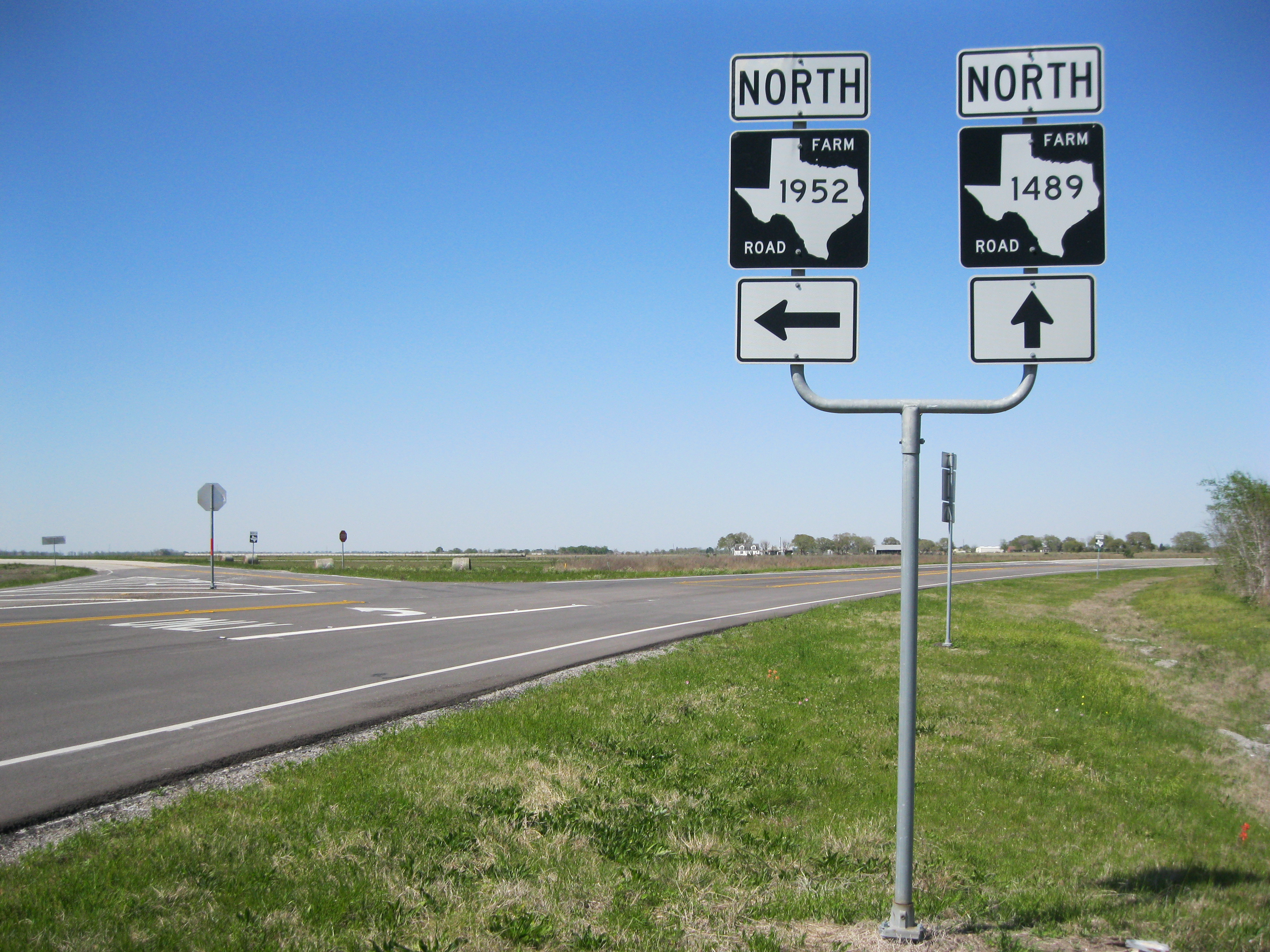
FM 1952 and FM 1489 intersection north of Tavener

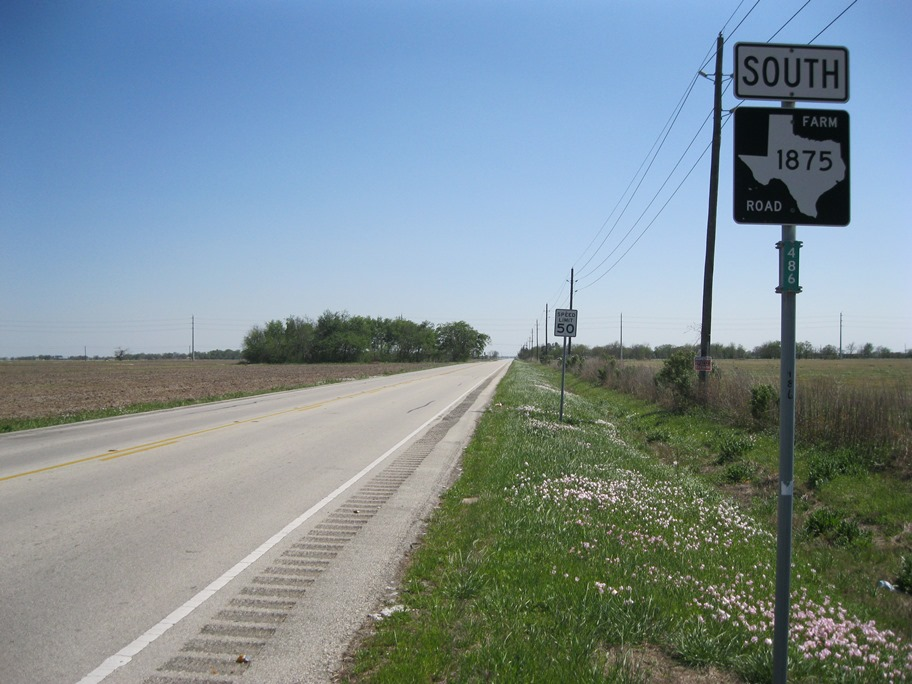
View south on FM 1875 near US 90A east of Tavener
