= Brazos Independent School District =

School district in Texas, United States

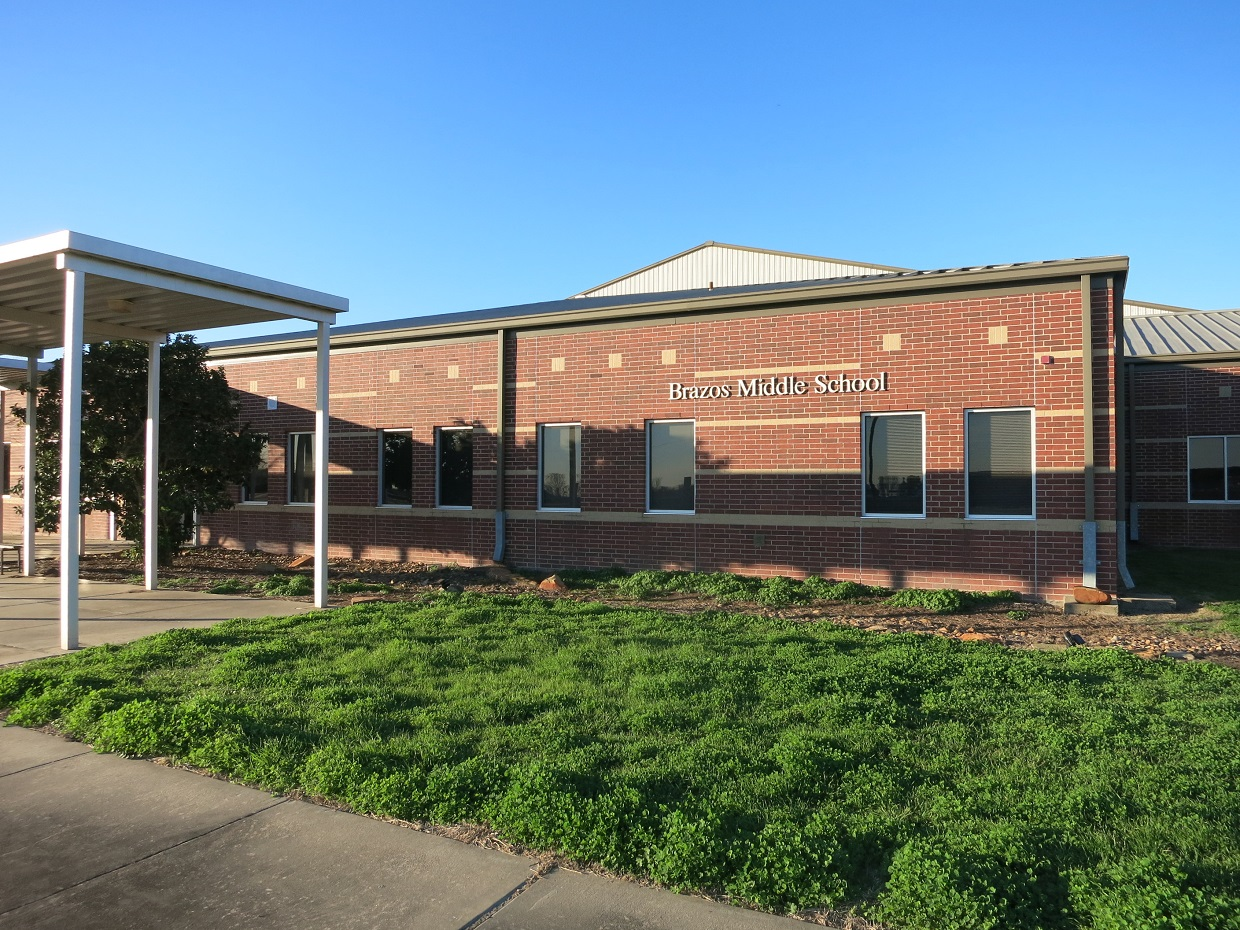
- Brazos Middle School in Wallis

Address
- 227 Educator Lane ESC Region 6 Wallis, Texas, 77485; United States
- Coordinates: 29°37′9″N 96°2′12″W

District information
- Type: Public Independent school district
- Motto: Excellence in Education
- Grades: EE through 12
- Superintendent: Scott Rogers (2021-present)
- Schools: 3 (2021)
- NCES District ID: 4844470

Students and staff
- Students: 859 (2023–2024)
- Teachers: 63.18 (on an FTE basis) (2023–2024)
- Staff: 76.95 (on an FTE basis) (2023–2024)
- Student–teacher ratio: 13.60 (2023–2024)
- Athletic conference: UIL Class 3A Football Division II
- District mascot: Cougars
- Colors: Red, Black

Other information
- TEA District Accountability Rating for 2011-12: Recognized
- Website: www.brazosisd.net

Brazos Independent School District, formerly Wallis-Orchard Independent School District, is a public school district based in Wallis, Texas, United States. The student population of Brazos Independent School District (BISD) for the 2025 school year is 859 students. The district lies in the counties of Austin and Fort Bend. In addition to Wallis, the district also serves the city of Orchard and parts of Rosenberg.

== History ==
In the 1970s Orchard ISD and Wallis ISD merged to form Wallis-Orchard ISD. In the late 1990s the District changed its name to Brazos ISD. The former Orchard ISD portion is in Fort Bend County and was formed from 4 Common Schools: Orchard, Randon, Krasna & Tavener.

== Finances ==
As of the 2010-2011 school year, the appraised valuation of property in the district was $326,473,000. The maintenance tax rate was $1.04 and the bond tax rate was $0.36 per $100 of appraised valuation.

== Academic achievement ==
In 2011, the school district was rated "recognized" by the Texas Education Agency. Thirty-five percent of districts in Texas in 2011 received the same rating. No state accountability ratings will be given to districts in 2012. A school district in Texas can receive one of four possible rankings from the Texas Education Agency: Exemplary (the highest possible ranking), Recognized, Academically Acceptable, and Academically Unacceptable (the lowest possible ranking).

TEA District Report Card

- 2020: Not Rated due to the COVID-19 pandemic
- 2019: B rated with an overall score of 88/100

== Schools ==
Regular instructional

- Brazos High School (Grades 9-12)
- Brazos Middle School (Grades 6-8)
- Brazos Elementary School (Grades EE-5)

Alternative instructional

- Prairie Harbor Alternative School (Grades 5-12). Closed September 2020. This school was located at and serviced a residential treatment facility that closed.
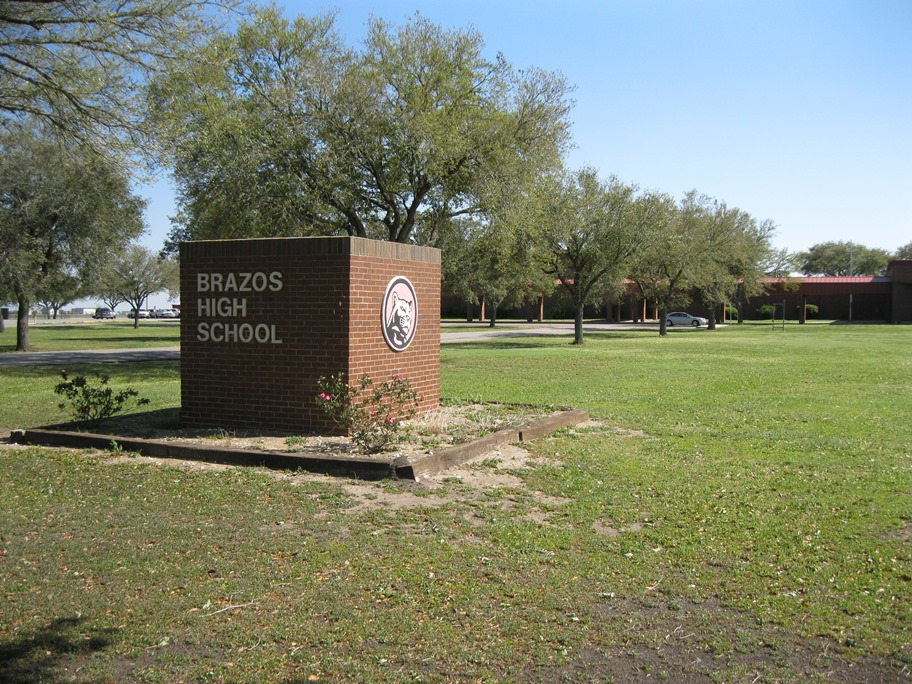
Brazos High School on Highway 36 east of Wallis

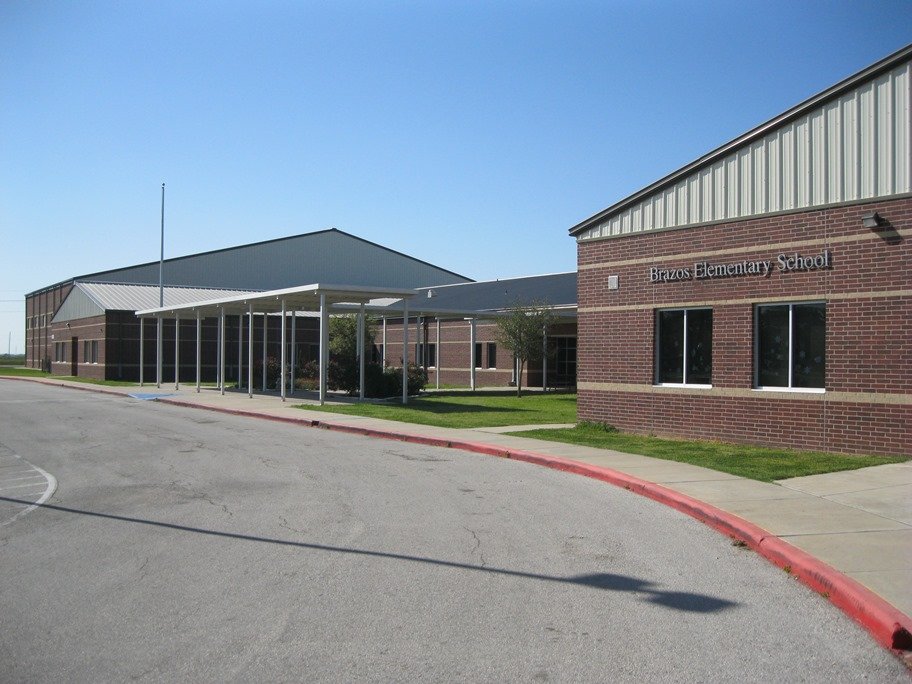
Brazos Elementary School in Orchard

== Special programs ==
=== Athletics ===
Brazos High School participates in Baseball, Cheer, Cross Country, Golf, Football, Power Lifting, Softball, Tennis, Track and Volleyball. In 2021-2022 the UIL has placed Brazos High School football in UIL Class 3A, Division 2, Region 4, District 14.

=== Band ===
The Mighty Brazos Cougar Band is available for all grades 6-12 to join.

== See also ==
- List of school districts in Texas
- List of high schools in Texas
