= List of Farm to Market Roads in Texas (900–999) =

- Texas Farm to Market Road and Ranch to Market Road markers

Highway names
- Interstates: Interstate Highway X (IH-X, I-X)
- US Highways: U.S. Highway X (US X)
- State: State Highway X (SH X)
- Loops: Loop X
- Spurs: Spur X
- Recreational: Recreational Road X (RE X)
- Farm or Ranch to Market Roads: Farm to Market Road X (FM X); Ranch to Market Road X (RM X)
- Park Roads: Park Road X (PR X)

System links
- Highways in Texas; Interstate; US; State; Former; Toll; Loops; Spurs; FM/RM; Park; Rec

Farm to Market Roads in Texas are owned and maintained by the Texas Department of Transportation (TxDOT).

== FM 900 ==
Farm to Market Road 900
- Location: Franklin and Hopkins counties
- Length: 20.601 mi (Note: The certified length given is shorter than the actual mileage as the TxDOT description of FM 900 considers it to be discontinuous at rather than concurrent with SH 37 and US 67.) (33.154 km)
- Existed: 1948–present

Farm to Market Road 900 (FM 900) is located in Hopkins and Franklin counties.

FM 900 begins at an intersection with FM 115 near Lake Cypress Springs. The highway travels in a generally westward direction to the town of Purley, where it has a short overlap with SH 37. After the overlap, FM 900 continues to run west before turning north near Hopkins County Road 3372. The highway crosses over I-30 before entering the town of Saltillo where it has an overlap with US 67. FM 900 continues to run north before turning northwest then to the west to its northern terminus at FM 69.

FM 900 was designated on November 23, 1948, running westward from SH 37 to Purley at a distance of approximately 0.6 mi (0.97 km). On July 21, 1949, the highway was extended westward to the Franklin–Hopkins county line. On September 28, 1949, FM 900 was extended westward and northward to US 67 in Saltillo and absorbed FM 908. On November 24, 1950, FM 900 was extended northward from US 67 to FM 270 (now FM 69). On August 15, 1968, the highway was extended southeastward to its current southern terminus at FM 115.

Junction list

County	Location	mi	km	Destinations	Notes
Franklin		0.0	0.0	FM 115 – Scroggins	
Franklin	Purley	2.5	4.0	SH 37 south – Winnsboro	South end of SH 37 overlap
Franklin	Purley	2.6	4.2	SH 37 north – Mount Vernon	North end of SH 37 overlap
Hopkins		6.3	10.1	FM 3019 south	
Hopkins		11.2	18.0	I-30 – Sulphur Springs, Mount Vernon	I-30 exit 141
Hopkins	Saltillo	12.3	19.8	US 67 south – Sulphur Springs	South end of US 67 overlap
Hopkins	Saltillo	12.6	20.3	US 67 north – Mount Vernon	North end of US 67 overlap
Hopkins		21.0	33.8	FM 69 – Dike, Sulphur Bluff	
1.000 mi = 1.609 km; 1.000 km = 0.621 mi: Concurrency terminus

== FM 901 ==
Farm to Market Road 901
- Location: Grayson County
- Length: 25.526 mi (41.080 km)
- Existed: 1948–present

Farm to Market Road 901 (FM 901) is located in Grayson County. It runs from FM 902 near Ethel north and west to end of pavement, where it becomes Delaware Bend Road. There are concurrencies with SH 56 and US 377.

FM 901 was designated on November 23, 1948, to run from US 82 in Whitesboro north and east to Gordonville. On January 13, 1958, the section from US 82 to 1.3 miles (2.1 km) west of Gordonville was transferred to SH 10 (now US 377), and the road was extended south from Gordonville to US 82 (now SH 56), replacing FM 1282. On November 24, 1959, the road was extended south to FM 902 and northwest 7.0 miles (11.3 km) to its current end.

== FM 902 ==
Farm to Market Road 902
- Location: Cooke and Grayson counties
- Length: 41.455 mi (66.715 km)
- Existed: 1948–present

Farm to Market Road 902 (FM 902) is located in Cooke and Grayson counties. It runs from FM 372 to SH 11 in Tom Bean. There are concurrencies with US 377, Bus. US 377, and US 75/SH 5.

FM 902 was designated on November 23, 1948, to run from SH 289 east to Dorchester. On December 18, 1951, the road was extended west 3.5 miles (5.6 km) to a road intersection. On December 17, 1952, the road was extended east to US 75. On October 28, 1953, the road was extended west to SH 10 (now US 377) in Collinsville, replacing FM 1898. On December 5, 1958, the road was extended east replacing a section of FM 1281 to Tom Bean, as FM 1281 was rerouted northwest (and is now part of SH 11). On May 6, 1964, the road was extended west to FM 372, replacing FM 2390.

== FM 903 ==
Farm to Market Road 903
- Location: Hunt County
- Length: 11.979 mi (19.278 km)
- Existed: 1948–present

Farm to Market Road 903 (FM 903) is located in Hunt County. It runs from US 380 to US 69 in Kingston.

FM 903 was designated on November 23, 1948, to run from SH 24 (now US 380) north 3.5 miles (5.6 km) to Wagner. On November 30, 1949, the road was extended to US 69 in Kingston.

== FM 904 ==
Farm to Market Road 904
- Location: Delta, Hunt, and Fannin counties
- Length: 13.679 mi (22.014 km)
- Existed: 1948–present

Farm to Market Road 904 (FM 904) is located in Delta, Hunt, and Fannin counties. It runs from SH 24 to FM 1550 in Dial.

FM 904 was designated on November 23, 1948, to run from SH 24 north to Yowell. On September 28, 1949, the road was extended north to the then-new FM 1532. On November 30, 1949, the road was extended north 2.0 miles (3.2 km). The road was extended north to FM 64 on August 24, 1955. On May 2, 1962, the road was extended to FM 1550, its current terminus.

== FM 905 ==
Farm to Market Road 905
- Location: Lamar County
- Length: 15.593 mi (25.095 km)
- Existed: 1948–present

Farm to Market Road 905 (FM 905) is located in Lamar County. It runs from Loop 286 to FM 1497.

FM 905 was designated on November 23, 1948, to run from US 271 in Paris south to Jennings. On November 25, 1949, the road was extended 5.2 miles (8.4 km) to a road intersection south of Clardy. On March 29, 1957, the northernmost section became part of Loop 286. On July 11, 1968, the road was extended south to FM 1497.

== FM 906 ==
Farm to Market Road 906
- Location: Lamar County
- Length: 20.702 mi (33.317 km)
- Existed: 1948–present

Farm to Market Road 906 (FM 906) is located in Lamar County. It runs from FM 197 east and sotuh to FM 195.

FM 906 was designated on November 23, 1948, to run from US 271 east to Slate Shoals. On August 25, 1949, the road was extended east to Faulkner. On May 23, 1951, the road was extended south 1.0 mile (1.6 km). On October 28, 1953, the road was extended to FM 195 near Novice. On May 23, 1968, the road was extended northwest to FM 197.

== FM 907 ==
Farm to Market Road 907
- Location: Hidalgo County
- Length: 16.975 mi (27.319 km)
- Existed: May 23, 1951–present

Farm to Market Road 907 (FM 907) is located in Hidalgo County. It runs from FM 1925 to US 81.

FM 907 was designated on May 23, 1951, to run from US 83 (now Bus. US 83) south to US 281. On April 20, 1954, the road was extended north to SH 107. On June 28, 1963, the road was extended to FM 1925. The road was internally redesignated as Urban Road 907 (UR 907) on June 27, 1995, but was reverted to FM 907 on November 15, 2018.

=== FM 907 (1948) ===
Farm to Market Road 907
- Location: Lamar County
- Existed: November 23, 1948–February 1, 1949

A previous route numbered FM 907 was designated on November 23, 1948, from US 82 north of Brookston north and west to Maxey. FM 907 was cancelled on February 1, 1949, and became a portion of FM 38.

== FM 908 ==
Farm to Market Road 908
- Location: Burleson and Milam counties
- Length: 34.094 mi (54.869 km)
- Existed: May 23, 1951–present

Farm to Market Road 908 (FM 908) is located in Burleson and Milam counties. It runs from SH 21 northwest to FM 486.

FM 908 was designated on May 23, 1951, to run from US 79 south 5.0 miles (8.0 km) to a road intersection. On December 2, 1953, the road was extended northwest 6.2 miles (10.0 km) to another road intersection. On October 31, 1957, the road was extended northwest 3.0 miles (4.8 km) to near the San Gabriel Bridge and southeast to SH 21, replacing FM 2128 (which was removed on November 29). On October 31, 1958, the road was extended west to FM 486.

=== FM 908 (1948) ===
Farm to Market Road 908
- Location: Hopkins County
- Existed: November 23, 1948–September 28, 1949

A previous route numbered FM 908 was designated on November 23, 1948, from US 67 at Saltillo south to Greenwood. FM 908 was cancelled on September 28, 1949 and became a portion of FM 900.

== FM 909 ==
Farm to Market Road 909
- Location: Red River County
- Length: 16.938 mi (27.259 km)
- Existed: 1948–present

Farm to Market Road 909 (FM 909) is located in Red River County. It runs from US 82 in Clarksville to SH 37 in Bogata.

FM 909 was designated on November 23, 1948, on a nearby road from US 271 in Bogata north to FM 411; the southern terminus was corrected to SH 37 on September 28, 1949. On December 18, 1951, a spur connection was added in Bogata. On March 20, 1952, the entire route became part of rerouted SH 37, with the spur connection becoming Texas State Highway Spur 38 (a spur off of Loop 38, now Bus. US 271), and FM 909 was reassigned to the old route of SH 37.

== FM 910 ==
Farm to Market Road 910
- Location: Red River County
- Length: 10.106 mi (16.264 km)
- Existed: 1948–present

Farm to Market Road 910 (FM 910) is located in Red River County. It runs from FM 909 in Clarksville to FM 1487.

FM 910 was designated on November 23, 1948, to run from SH 37 (now FM 909) south 6.0 miles (9.7 km) to a road intersection. On June 2, 1967, the road was extended south to FM 1487.

== FM 911 ==
Farm to Market Road 911
- Location: Red River County
- Length: 12.847 mi (20.675 km)
- Existed: November 23, 1948–present

Farm to Market Road 911 is a 12.847-mile (20.675 km) state road in Red River County that connects FM 44 in Lydia with FM 114 east of English.

FM 911 was designated on November 23, 1948, to run from US 82 in Avery south to Lydia. The road was extended north to what later became part of FM 114 on October 28, 1953.

== FM 912 ==
Farm to Market Road 912
- Location: Washington County
- Length: 3.014 mi (4.851 km)
- Existed: February 25, 1954–present

Farm to Market Road 912 (FM 912) is located in Washington County. It runs from SH 105 at Sommers Gin northeast to FM 1155.

FM 912 was designated on February 25, 1954, to run from SH 90 (now SH 105) northeast and north via Washington to another point on SH 90 (now SH 105) as a replacement of a section of SH 90, which was rerouted. On March 5, 1963, the section northeast of FM 1155 was redesignated as an extension of FM 1155.

=== FM 912 (1948) ===
Farm to Market Road 912
- Location: Erath County
- Existed: November 23, 1948–February 6, 1953

A previous route numbered FM 912 was designated on November 23, 1948, from US 67 at Dublin north to Lingleville. FM 912 was cancelled on February 6, 1953, and its mileage was transferred to FM 219.

== FM 913 ==
Farm to Market Road 913
- Location: Erath County
- Length: 5.143 mi (8.277 km)
- Existed: 1948–present

Farm to Market Road 913 (FM 913) is located in Erath County. It runs from US 281 northeast via Selden to US 67.

FM 913 was designated on November 23, 1948, to run from US 281 east to Selden. On November 20, 1951, the road was extended northeast to US 67.

== FM 914 ==
Farm to Market Road 914
- Location: Erath and Hamilton Counties
- Length: 21.952 mi (35.328 km)
- Existed: 1948–present

Farm to Market Road 914 (FM 914) is located in Erath and Hamilton Counties. It runs from US 67 south to FM 1744.

FM 914 was designated on November 23, 1948, to run from US 67 (now SH 108) southwest 3.7 miles (6.0 km). On July 14, 1949, the road was extended south 4.1 miles (6.6 km) to a road intersection. On May 23, 1951, the road was extended south to SH 6 in Alexander. On October 31, 1957, the road was extended south 0.5 miles (0.80 km) to another road intersection, creating a concurrency with SH 6. On January 30, 1964, the section from US 67 (now SH 108) to Loop 195 (now US 67) was cancelled (this section is now known as West Long and Alexander Road), and the concurrency with SH 6 was removed. On May 6, 1964, the road was extended south 4.0 miles (6.4 km). On June 2, 1967, the road was extended south 4.3 miles (6.9 km) to the Erath/Hamilton County Line. On July 11, 1968, the road was extended to FM 1744, its current terminus

== RM 915 ==
Ranch to Market Road 915
- Location: Irion and Schleicher counties
- Length: 30.682 mi (49.378 km)
- Existed: May 23, 1951 (Note: RM 915 was previously designated as FM 915 from 1951 to 1959.)–present

Ranch to Market Road 915 (RM 915) is located in Irion and Schleicher counties. It runs from US 67 near Mertzon to US 277 in Eldorado.

RM 915 was designated on May 23, 1951 (numbered July 6) as Farm to Market Road 915 (FM 915), running from US 67 near Mertzon southeast 5.0 miles (8.0 km) to a road intersection. On November 20, 1951, the road was extended to the Irion/Schleicher County Line. On January 23, 1953 (connecting section added December 17, 1952), the road was extended to US 277 in Eldorado, replacing FM 1766. On November 13, 1959, the designation was changed to RM 915.

=== FM 915 (1948) ===
Farm to Market Road 915
- Location: Hood County
- Existed: November 23, 1948–July 5, 1951

FM 915 was designated on November 23, 1948, from US 377 in Tolar south 6.3 miles (10.1 km). In May 23, 1951, the road was extended south to the Somervell County line. The route was cancelled on July 5, 1951, and became a portion of FM 201 (now FM 56).

== FM 916 ==
Farm to Market Road 916
- Location: Johnson and Ellis counties
- Length: 31.752 mi (51.100 km)
- Existed: 1948–present

Farm to Market Road 916 (FM 916) is located in Johnson and Ellis counties. It runs from FM 66 southwest to Ham Creek Park.

FM 916 was designated on November 23, 1948, to run from US 81 (now SH 81) in Grandview east to the Johnson/Ellis County Line. On July 15, 1949, the road extended east to FM 66 in Maypearl. On February 6, 1953, the road extended to SH 174 in Rio Vista, replacing FM 1806 and FM 1705 and creating concurrencies with FM 110 (now FM 4) and SH 171. On January 24, 1957, the road was extended southwest 5.0 miles (8.0 km) to a road intersection, creating a concurrency with SH 174. On May 5, 1966, the road was extended southwest 3.3 miles (5.3 km) to Ham Creek Park.

== FM 917 ==
Farm to Market Road 917
- Location: Johnson County
- Length: 28.055 mi (45.150 km)
- Existed: November 23, 1948–present

Farm to Market Road 917 (FM 917) is located in Johnson County. It runs from SH 171 in Godley to US 287 near Mansfield.

FM 917 was designated on November 23, 1948, from US 81 (now I-35W) northwest of Alvarado northeast 4.3 miles (6.9 km) towards Lillian. On July 14, 1949, the road was extended northeast 2.4 miles (3.9 km) to Lillian. On October 2, 1951, the road was extended to SH 171 in Godley, replacing FM 918 and creating a concurrency with US 81. On January 24, 1954, the road was extended to US 287 (now US 287 Bus.) near Mansfield, replacing FM 2477. On December 15, 1974, the break in the route at US 81 was removed due to construction of I-35W. On February 27, 2003, FM 917 was rerouted around Lillian; the section from Thomas Lane northeast to FM 2738 was removed altogether and the section from existing FM 2738 to Becky Lane became a section of FM 2738. However, seven months later FM 2738 was modified to run west and south to new FM 917 instead of east (the section from FM 2738 east to new FM 917 was returned to the county). On April 30, 2015, FM 917 was extended southeast over Bus. US 287 to US 287.

== FM 918 ==
Farm to Market Road 918
- Location: Rusk County
- Length: 3.43 mi (5.52 km)
- Existed: February 20, 1963–present

Farm to Market Road 918 (FM 918) is located in Rusk County. It runs from SH 42/SH 135 in Sexton City to US 259.

FM 918 was designated on February 20, 1963, on the current route, replacing a section of SH 135, which was rerouted on a more direct route.

=== FM 918 (1948–1951) ===
Farm to Market Road 918
- Location: Johnson County
- Existed: November 23, 1948–October 2, 1951

The first use of the FM 918 designation was on November 23, 1948, in Johnson County, from SH 174 in Joshua to Egan. On July 14, 1949, the road was extended west 5.0 miles (8.0 km) to a road intersection. On May 23, 1951, the road was extended west 4.7 miles (7.6 km) to SH 171 and east 2.8 miles (4.5 km) to US 81 (now I-35W). FM 918 was cancelled on October 2, 1951, and became a portion of FM 917.

=== FM 918 (1953–1962) ===
Farm to Market Road 918
- Location: Navarro County
- Length: 3.43 mi (5.52 km)
- Existed: October 28, 1953–October 29, 1962

The second use of the FM 918 designation was on October 28, 1953, in Navarro County, from FM 55 in Dresden to SH 22 near Corsicana. On September 21, 1955, FM 918 was extended west to FM 639 at Brush Prairie. FM 918 was cancelled on October 29, 1962, and became a portion of FM 744.

== FM 919 ==
Farm to Market Road 919
- Location: Palo Pinto County
- Length: 15.696 mi (25.260 km)
- Existed: 1948–present

Farm to Market Road 919 (FM 919) is located in Palo Pinto County. It runs from US 180 via Gordon to US 80.

FM 919 was designated on November 23, 1948, to run from SH 193 in Gordon to US 80 (now I-20). On May 23, 1951, the road was extended north 4.5 miles (7.2 km) to a road intersection. On November 20, 1951, the road was extended north 5.1 miles (8.2 km). On June 24, 1952, the road was extended north to US 180.

== FM 920 ==
Farm to Market Road 920
- Location: Parker and Wise counties
- Length: 34.908 mi (Note: The certified length given is shorter than the actual mileage, as the TxDOT description of RM 1623 considers it to be discontinuous at US 290.) (56.179 km)
- Existed: 1948–present

Farm to Market Road 920 (FM 920) is located in Parker and Wise counties. It runs from Weatherford to Bridgeport. The route was designated on November 23, 1948, from FM 51 in Weatherford northward 23.1 miles (37.2 km) to Boonsville. On July 14, 1949, FM 920 was extended north to SH 24 (now SH 114).

Junction list

County	Location	mi	km	Destinations	Notes
Parker	Weatherford	0.0	0.0	FM 51 (Main Street)	Southern terminus
Parker		5.5	8.9	FM 1885	
Parker	Poolville	15.5	24.9	FM 3107 (Lone Star Road)	
Wise		18.9	30.4	SH 199 east	Southern end of SH 199 concurrency
Wise		19.0	30.6	SH 199 west	Northern end of SH 199 concurrency
Wise	Balsora	25.9	41.7	FM 2210	
Wise	Bridgeport	35.0	56.3	SH 114 (Hovey Street)	Northern terminus
1.000 mi = 1.609 km; 1.000 km = 0.621 mi

== FM 921 ==
Farm to Market Road 921
- Location: Cherokee County
- Length: 0.246 mi (396 m)
- Existed: November 24, 1959–present

Farm to Market Road 921 (FM 921) is located in Cherokee County. It runs from US 79 east of Neches, north to a county road east of the Anderson County line.

FM 921 was designated on November 24, 1959, along its current route.

=== FM 921 (1948) ===
Farm to Market Road 921
- Location: Archer County
- Existed: November 23, 1948–February 2, 1959

A previous route numbered FM 921 was designated in Archer County on November 23, 1948, from US 82 west of Menkins, south to Black Flat. This designation was cancelled on February 2, 1959, and transferred to FM 368.

== FM 922 ==
Farm to Market Road 922
- Location: Montague, Cooke, and Grayson counties
- Length: 40.652 mi (65.423 km)
- Existed: November 23, 1948–present

Farm to Market Road 922 (FM 922) is located in Montague, Cooke, and Grayson counties. It runs from FM 455 in Forestburg to US 377 near Tioga. FM 922 crosses Lake Ray Roberts at the Cooke–Grayson county line.

FM 922 was designated on November 23, 1948, from FM 51 near Era to US 77 in Valley View. On July 14, 1949, FM 922 was extended east 3.4 miles (5.5 km) to what is now FM 2071. On November 20, 1951, it was extended west 4.6 miles (7.4 km) to a road intersection. On October 31, 1957, FM 922 was extended west to FM 455. On June 1, 1965, FM 922 was extended southeast 2.7 miles (4.3 km). On May 5, 1966, FM 922 was extended east 2 miles (3.2 km) to FM 372 at Mountain Springs. On August 31, 1981, FM 922 was extended east to US 377 north of Tioga.

== FM 923 ==
Farm to Market Road 923
- Location: Throckmorton County
- Length: 13.724 mi (22.087 km)
- Existed: November 23, 1948–present

Farm to Market Road 923 (FM 923) is located in Throckmorton County. The road begins at US 183 northwest of Woodson, and continues north, then west, then eventually back north, ending a few miles west of Throckmorton at US 380.

FM 923 was designated on November 23, 1948, from SH 24 (now US 380) 4 miles (6.4 km) west of Throckmorton south and east to US 183. On February 25, 1949, the road was rerouted so that it ended at SH 24 2 miles (3.2 km) west of Throckmorton. On September 29, 1954, FM 923 was extended east and south 3.5 miles (5.6 km) to a road intersection. On October 31, 1957, FM 923 was extended south and east to US 183.

== FM 924 ==
Farm to Market Road 924
- Location: Hardeman and Wilbarger counties
- Length: 19.258 mi (30.993 km)
- Existed: 1948–present

Farm to Market Road 924 (FM 924) is located in Hardeman and Wilbarger counties. It runs from FM 91 east and north to Doans.

FM 924 was designated on November 23, 1948, to run from US 283 east and north to Doans. On May 23, 1951, the road was extended west to FM 432. On June 28, 1963, the road was extended west to FM 91.

== FM 925 ==
Farm to Market Road 925
- Location: Hardeman and Wilbarger counties
- Length: 16.091 mi (25.896 km)
- Existed: 1948–present

Farm to Market Road 925 (FM 925) is located in Hardeman and Wilbarger counties. It runs from US 283 via Farmer's Valley to US 287. There is a concurrency with US 287 (which the road intersects twice).

FM 925 was designated on November 23, 1948, to run from US 287 west to Farmer's Valley. On September 29, 1954, the road was extended east to US 283. On November 21, 1956, the road extended northwest to another point on US 287.

== FM 926 ==
Farm to Market Road 926
- Location: Young County
- Length: 12.904 mi (20.767 km)
- Existed: November 23, 1948–present

Farm to Market Road 926 (FM 926) is located in Young County. The road begins at US 380 in Newcastle and continues northwest eventually ending at SH 79 south of Padgett.

FM 926 was designated on November 23, 1948, from SH 251 in Newcastle northwest 9.1 miles (14.6 km) to a road intersection. On December 16, 1948, FM 926 was extended northwest to SH 79. On February 23, 1993, the section of SH 251 from FM 926 to US 380 was transferred to FM 926.

== FM 927 ==
Farm to Market Road 927
- Location: Bosque County
- Length: 26.066 mi (41.949 km)
- Existed: 1948–present

Farm to Market Road 927 (FM 927) is located in Bosque County. It runs from SH 6 in Iredell east to Lake Whitney. There are concurrencies with SH 144 and SH 174.

FM 927 was designated on November 23, 1948, to run from SH 144 in Walnut Springs to SH 353 (now SH 174) in Morgan. On November 20, 1951, the road was extended east to a road that became part of FM 56 on October 26, 1954. On August 20, 1952, the road was extended southwest to SH 6 in Iredell, replacing a section of SH 174 (which was rerouted over SH 353). On October 3, 1955, The road was relocated in Iredell and Walnut Springs. On June 2, 1967, the road was extended east to Lake Whitney.

== FM 928 ==
Farm to Market Road 928
- Location: Castro and Swisher counties
- Length: 29.868 mi (48.068 km)
- Existed: May 23, 1951–present

Farm to Market Road 928 (FM 928) is located in Castro and Swisher counties. It runs from FM 168 east and north to SH 86. There is a concurrency with FM 1424.

FM 928 was designated on May 23, 1951, to run from US 87 at Houston School west 7.0 miles (11.3 km) to a county road. On November 24, 1959, the road extended west to FM 2355 (now FM 1424). On September 20, 1961, the road was extended east 6.0 miles (9.7 km) to another county road. On May 6, 1964, the road was extended north to SH 86. On June 1, 1965, the road was extended west to FM 168.

=== FM 928 (1948) ===
Farm to Market Road 928
- Location: Bosque County
- Existed: November 23, 1948–July 14, 1949

A previous route numbered FM 928 was designated on November 23, 1948, from 1.5 miles (2.4 km) north of Norse south via Norse to FM 215 (now FM 219) 7 miles (11 km) north of Clifton, then south and west to the Coryell County line. FM 928 was cancelled on July 14, 1949, and became a portion of FM 182.

== FM 929 ==
Farm to Market Road 929
- Location: Coryell County
- Length: 14.023 mi (22.568 km)
- Existed: 1948–present

Farm to Market Road 929 (FM 929) is located in Coryell County. It runs from SH 36 northeast and southeast to FM 185 near Osage.

FM 929 was designated on November 23, 1948, to run from SH 36 3.0 miles (4.8 km) north of Gatesville to Coryell City. On April 28, 1950, the end at SH 36 was moved to be at or near the south property line of the State Training School. On October 28, 1953, the road was extended southeast to FM 185 near Osage.

== FM 930 ==
Farm to Market Road 930
- Location: Coryell County
- Length: 4.889 mi (7.868 km)
- Existed: 1948–present

Farm to Market Road 930 (FM 930) is located in Coryell County. It runs from US 84 west of Arnett north to Levita.

FM 930 was designated on November 23, 1948, on the current route.

== FM 931 ==
Farm to Market Road 931
- Location: Coryell County
- Length: 5.782 mi (9.305 km)
- Existed: November 23, 1948–present

Farm to Market Road 931 (FM 931) is located in Coryell County. It runs from SH 36 at Flat to CR 348 and CR 344 northeast of Leon Junction.

FM 931 was designated on November 23, 1948, from SH 36 at Flat south 3.3 miles (5.3 km) to a county road. On December 17, 1952, the road was extended northeast 4.7 miles (7.6 km) to a point 1 mile (1.6 km) northeast of Leon Junction. On May 1, 1965, a section from 1.7 miles (2.7 km) south of SH 36 south 1.6 miles (2.6 km) was removed from the highway system due to expansion of the Fort Hood Military Reservation. On March 27, 2014, the remainder of FM 931 south of SH 36 was removed and turned over to Coryell County.

== FM 932 ==
Farm to Market Road 932
- Location: Hamilton and Coryell counties
- Length: 22.957 mi (36.946 km)
- Existed: 1948–present

Farm to Market Road 932 (FM 932) is located in Hamilton and Coryell counties. It runs from SH 36 in Hamilton southeast to US 84.

FM 932 was designated on November 23, 1948, to run from SH 36 in Hamilton to Aleman. On November 20, 1951, the road was extended to the Hamilton/Coryell County Line. On January 14, 1952, the road was extended to US 84, replacing a section of FM 183.

== FM 933 ==
Farm to Market Road 933
- Location: McLennan and Hill counties
- Length: 49.376 mi (79.463 km)
- Existed: 1948–present

Farm to Market Road 933 (FM 933) is located in McLennan and Hill counties. It runs from SH 174 north of Blum to US 84 in Waco.

FM 933 was designated on November 23, 1948, to run from Loop 180 (now Spur 180) in Whitney north to Huron. On July 14, 1949, the road was extended north 4.5 miles (7.2 km). On September 28, 1949, the road was extended north 3.8 miles (6.1 km) to FM 67 in Blum. On November 21, 1956, the road was extended southwest to Lake Whitney State Park. On July 21, 1961, the road was extended north to SH 174, replacing a section of FM 67, and rerouted south of Whitney to US 84 in Waco, replacing part of Loop 180 (the remainder was changed to Spur 180) and all of FM 1244 (which was reassigned to the old route of FM 933 from Whitney to Lake Whitney State Park). On May 19, 1966, the spur connection was cancelled and became part of FM 3051. On June 27, 1995, the section from FM 308 to US 84 was internally redesignated as Urban Road 933 (UR 933). The mileage was transferred back to FM 933 upon the removal of the UR system on November 15, 2018.

== FM 934 ==
Farm to Market Road 934
- Location: Hill County
- Length: 28.801 mi (46.351 km)
- Existed: 1948–present

Farm to Market Road 934 (FM 934) is located in Hill County. It runs from FM 933 east and southeast to US 77. There are concurrencies with FM 66 and SH 171.

FM 934 was designated on November 23, 1948, to run from US 81 (now SH 81) in Itasca to SH 171 in Osceola. On November 19, 1952, the east terminus was moved to FM 66 in Itasca. On October 18, 1954, the road was extended west to FM 933, replacing FM 1948. The road was extended east 4.0 miles (6.4 km) on January 24, 1955, and east and south to US 77 on July 28 of that year.

== FM 935 ==
Farm to Market Road 935
- Location: Bell and Falls counties
- Length: 21.847 mi (35.159 km)
- Existed: 1948–present

Farm to Market Road 935 (FM 935) is located in Bell and Falls counties. It runs from I-35 in Troy east via via Belfalls to SH 7.

FM 935 was designated on November 23, 1948, to run from US 77 southwest 3.9 miles (6.3 km) to a road intersection east of Durango (Union School). On May 31, 1950, the road was extended southwest 0.6 miles (0.97 km) to another road intersection. On July 28, 1955, the road was extended to US 81 (now I-35) at Troy, replacing FM 1178. On July 15, 1957, US 77 was rerouted, so the east terminus was at a county road 0.5 miles (0.80 km) east of it. On September 20, 1961, the road was extended east 2.1 miles (3.4 km) to another county road. On May 2, 1962, the road was extended east to SH 7.

== FM 936 ==
Farm to Market Road 936
- Location: Limestone and Hill counties
- Length: 11.732 mi (18.881 km)
- Existed: 1948–present

Farm to Market Road 936 (FM 936) is located in Limestone and Hill counties. It runs from SH 31 to FM 73 southwest of Coolidge.

FM 936 was designated on November 23, 1948, to run from FM 73 northwest to Calina. On July 28, 1955, the road was extended to SH 31.

== FM 937 ==
Farm to Market Road 937
- Location: Limestone and Robertson counties
- Length: 22.363 mi (35.990 km)
- Existed: 1948–present

Farm to Market Road 937 (FM 937) is located in Limestone and Robertson Counties. It runs from SH 164 near Groesbeck southeast to SH 7.

FM 937 was designated on November 23, 1948, to run from SH 164 near Groesbeck southeast to Oletha. On October 31, 1958, the road was extended to SH 7. On September 27, 2018, the road was realigned in two spots.

== FM 938 ==
Farm to Market Road 938
- Location: McLennan County
- Length: 5.985 mi (9.632 km)
- Existed: 1948–present

Farm to Market Road 938 (FM 938) is located in McLennan County. It runs from US 84 near McGregor north to FM 185.

FM 938 was designated on November 23, 1948, on the current route. The road at the north end did not become part of FM 185 until July 14, 1949.

== FM 939 ==
Farm to Market Road 939
- Location: McLennan County
- Length: 13.165 mi (21.187 km)
- Existed: 1948–present

Farm to Market Road 939 (FM 939) is located in McLennan County. It runs from SH 164 in Mart northwest to SH 31.

FM 939 was designated on November 23, 1948, to run from US 84 to FM 342 north of Mart. On November 21, 1956, the road was extended northwest to SH 31. On November 18, 1975, the road was extended southeast to SH 164, replacing what was originally planned to be the new route of FM 342.

== FM 940 ==
Farm to Market Road 940
- Location: Bell County
- Length: 5.055 mi (8.135 km)
- Existed: October 31, 1958–present

Farm to Market Road 940 (FM 940) is located in Bell County. It runs from FM 437 east and north to FM 485.

FM 940 was designated on October 31, 1958, to run from FM 2269 (now FM 485) south to Meeks. On September 27, 1960, the road was extended west to FM 437.

=== FM 940 (1948) ===
Farm to Market Road 940
- Location: Nacogdoches County
- Existed: November 23, 1948–January 23, 1953

The first use of the FM 940 designation was in Nacogdoches County, from FM 225, 5 miles (8.0 km) south of Cushing, to Lilbert. FM 940 was cancelled on January 23, 1953, and transferred to FM 343.

=== FM 940 (1952) ===
Farm to Market Road 940
- Location: Nolan County
- Existed: December 17, 1952–April 1, 1958

The second use of the FM 940 designation was in Nolan County, from US 80 (now I-20) east to FM 608 near the southern city limit of Roscoe. It was not numbered until January 1953. FM 940 was cancelled on April 1, 1958, when US 80 was rerouted over it.

== FM 941 ==
Farm to Market Road 941
- Location: Nacogdoches County
- Length: 1.51 mi (2.43 km)
- Existed: November 23, 1948–present

Farm to Market Road 941 (FM 941) is a 1.5-mile (2.4 km) route in Nacogdoches County. It runs from US 59 through Appleby, briefly overlapping FM 2609, before state maintenance ends near the Bethel Baptist Church Cemetery. The roadway continues under county maintenance as Happy Land Road (CR 256).

FM 941 was designated on November 23, 1948, on the current route.

== FM 942 ==
Farm to Market Road 942
- Location: Polk County
- Length: 35.142 mi (56.556 km)
- Existed: 1948–present

Farm to Market Road 942 (FM 942) is located in Polk County. It runs from FM 350 east, north, and northwest to US 59 in Corrigan.

FM 942 was designated on November 23, 1948, to run from US 59 in Leggett east to Ollie Community. On November 20, 1951, the road was extended northeast to Hortense. On January 14, 1952, the road was extended north to FM 62, replacing FM 646. On December 1, 1955, the road extended northwest to US 59 in Camden. On October 31, 1958, the road was extended west 4.0 miles (6.4 km) from Leggett. On May 6, 1964, the road was extended west to FM 350. On September 29, 1987, the road was realigned in Corrigan, with the old route given to the city.

== FM 943 ==
Farm to Market Road 943
- Location: Polk and Hardin counties
- Length: 31.219 mi (50.242 km)
- Existed: 1948–present

Farm to Market Road 943 (FM 943) is located in Polk and Hardin counties. It runs from SH 146 east and southeast to FM 1003.

FM 943 was designated on November 23, 1948, to run from SH 146 near Schwab City to Segno. On December 17, 1952, the road was extended to FM 1276. On December 1, 1955, the road was extended east to Oak Shade. On November 21, 1956, the road was extended east to the Polk/Hardin County Line. On December 1, 1958, the road was extended east to FM 1003, replacing FM 2458.

== FM 944 ==
Farm to Market Road 944
- Location: Sabine County
- Length: 6.573 mi (10.578 km)
- Existed: 1948–present

Farm to Market Road 944 (FM 944) is located in Sabine County. It runs from SH 87 east to Toledo Bend Reservoir.

FM 944 was designated on November 23, 1948, to run from SH 87 in Hemphill southeast 10 miles (16 km) to Bayou. On October 29, 1953, the road was extended southeast 3.6 miles (5.8 km). On November 21, 1956, the road was extended southeast 2.5 miles (4.0 km) to Fairdale. On November 1, 1968, 8.87 miles (14.27 km) were inundated by Toledo Bend Reservoir.

== FM 945 ==
Farm to Market Road 945
- Location: San Jacinto County
- Length: 22.11 mi (35.58 km)
- Existed: 1948–present

Farm to Market Road 945 (FM 945) is located in San Jacinto County. It runs from FM 2025 northwest to SH 150, and then north and east to SH 156.

FM 945 was designated on November 23, 1948, to run from SH 150 in Evergreen to Everitt. On April 21, 1949, the road was extended south 2.6 miles (4.2 km) from Everitt. On November 20, 1951, the road was extended southeast to a road which became part of FM 2025 on December 17, 1952. On May 2, 1962, the road was extended north 1.6 miles (2.6 km) from SH 150. On June 28, 1963, the road was extended north and east to SH 156, replacing a section of FM 224.

== FM 946 ==
Farm to Market Road 946
- Location: San Jacinto County
- Length: 17.899 mi (28.806 km)
- Existed: 1948–present

Farm to Market Road 946 (FM 946) is located in San Jacinto County. It runs from SH 156 northwest and northeast to a county road.

FM 946 was designated on November 23, 1948, to run from US 190 in Oakhurst southeast 2.6 miles (4.2 km) to a road intersection on Willow Springs Road. On August 25, 1949, the road was extended southeast 3.0 miles (4.8 km). On December 17, 1952, the road was extended north 3.3 miles (5.3 km) from US 190. On October 29, 1953, the road was extended southeast to SH 156. On September 20, 1961, the road was extended north 1.7 miles (2.7 km). On May 2, 1962, the road was extended north 1.7 miles (2.7 km) to a county road.

== FM 947 ==
Farm to Market Road 947
- Location: Shelby County
- Length: 13.228 mi (21.288 km)
- Existed: 1948–present

Farm to Market Road 947 (FM 947) is located in Shelby County. It runs from US 59/84 northeast and southeast to a road intersection.

FM 947 was designated on November 23, 1948, to run from US 59/84 in Tenaha northwest to Tennessee Community. On October 13, 1954, the road was extended southwest to US 59/84 in Timpson. On June 28, 1963, the road was extended southeast 1.9 miles (3.1 km) from Tenaha to a road intersection.

== FM 948 ==
Farm to Market Road 948 (FM 948) is a designation that has been used twice. No highway currently uses the FM 948 designation.

=== FM 948 (1948) ===
Farm to Market Road 948
- Location: Trinity County
- Existed: November 23, 1948–January 23, 1953

The first use of the FM 948 designation was in Trinity County, from SH 94, northwest 2.7 miles (4.3 km) to a road intersection on Mossy Creek Road. On November 20, 1951, the road was extended northwest 2.1 miles (3.4 km) to another road intersection. FM 948 was cancelled on January 23, 1953, and became a portion of FM 358.

=== FM 948 (1954) ===
Farm to Market Road 948
- Location: Dickens and Kent counties
- Existed: January 27, 1954–August 29, 1990

The second use of the FM 948 designation was in Dickens and Kent counties from SH 70, 5 miles (8.0 km) southeast of Spur, south to US 380 at or near Claremont. It started out as Ranch to Market Road 948 (RM 948), but the road was changed to FM 948 by September 1954. On February 23, 1956, FM 948 was signed, but not designated, as SH 208. FM 948 was cancelled on August 29, 1990 as the extension of the SH 208 designation became official.

== FM 949 ==
Farm to Market Road 949

Route information
- Maintained by TxDOT
- Length: 26.133 mi (42.057 km)
- Existed: November 23, 1948–present

Major junctions
- South end: FM 102
- I-10 / US 90
- North end: SH 36 near Peters

Location
- Country: United States
- State: Texas
- Counties: Austin, Colorado

Highway system
- Highways in Texas; Interstate; US; State; Former; Toll; Loops; Spurs; FM/RM; Park; Rec
← FM 948	→ FM 950

Farm to Market Road 949 (FM 949) is a state highway in the U.S. state of Texas. The two-lane highway starts at FM 102 northwest of Eagle Lake in Colorado County, heads in a northerly direction across Interstate 10, swings northeast through the small communities of Bernardo and Cat Spring and ends at State Highway 36 (SH 36) near Peters in Austin County.

== FM 950 ==
Farm to Market Road 950
- Location: Colorado County
- Length: 6.398 mi (10.297 km)
- Existed: 1948–present

Farm to Market Road 950 (FM 950) is located in Colorado County. It runs from SH 71 in Garwood to FM 102 near Matthews.

FM 950 was designated on November 23, 1948, on the current route.

== FM 951 ==
Farm to Market Road 951
- Location: DeWitt County
- Length: 7.456 mi (11.999 km)
- Existed: 1948–present

Farm to Market Road 951 (FM 951) is located in DeWitt County. It runs from SH 111 west of Yoakum south and west to US 183 in Concrete.

FM 951 was designated on November 23, 1948, to run from SH 111 south 4.2 miles (6.8 km) to a road intersection. On November 24, 1959, the road was extended south and west to US 183.

== FM 952 ==
Farm to Market Road 952
- Location: DeWitt County
- Length: 6.602 mi (10.625 km)
- Existed: 1948–present

Farm to Market Road 952 (FM 952) is located in DeWitt County. It runs from SH 72 southwest of Yorktown west and southwest to a road intersection.

FM 952 was designated on November 23, 1948, to run from SH 72 west 4.2 miles (6.8 km). On August 23, 1950, the road was extended west to a road intersection at the former Buesing School. On October 28, 1953, the road was extended southwest 2.2 miles (3.5 km).

== FM 953 ==
Farm to Market Road 953
- Location: DeWitt County
- Length: 6.604 mi (10.628 km)
- Existed: 1948–present

Farm to Market Road 953 (FM 953) is located in DeWitt County. It runs from US 87 northwest of Cuero northeast to FM 766.

FM 953 was designated on November 23, 1948, to run from US 87 north and east 4.2 miles (6.8 km) to a county road. On May 23, 1951, the road extended east 2.8 miles (4.5 km) to a road intersection. On December 3, 1954, the road was extended north 4.4 miles (7.1 km) to another road intersection, but 1.3 miles (2.1 km) of this extension was cancelled due to the northern terminus changing on June 30, 1955. On September 2, 1955, the 3.1 miles (5.0 km) extension was transferred to FM 766.

== FM 954 ==
Farm to Market Road 954
- Location: Fayette County
- Length: 8.81 mi (14.18 km)
- Existed: 1948–present

Farm to Market Road 954 (FM 954) is located in Fayette County. It runs from SH 237 in Warrenton to SH 159 in Willow Springs.

FM 954 was designated on November 23, 1948, to run from SH 237 near Warrenton northwest 2.6 miles (4.2 km) to a road intersection northwest of Walhalla. On May 23, 1951, the road was extended northwest 3.2 miles (5.1 km) to a road intersection in Waldeck. On July 28, 1955, the road was extended north to US 290 in Ledbetter. On October 31, 1958, the road was extended southeast from another point on SH 237 to SH 159. On November 7, 1961, the section west of SH 237 was transferred to FM 1291.

== FM 955 ==
Farm to Market Road 955
- Location: Fayette County
- Length: 4.692 mi (7.551 km)
- Existed: 1948–present

Farm to Market Road 955 (FM 955) is located in Fayette County. It runs from SH 71 near Ellinger to SH 159 in Fayetteville.

FM 955 was designated on November 23, 1948, along its current route.

== FM 956 ==
Farm to Market Road 956
- Location: Fayette County
- Length: 4.096 mi (6.592 km)
- Existed: 1948–present

Farm to Market Road 956 (FM 956) is located in Fayette County. It runs from US 77 north of Schulenburg west and north to a road intersection in Freyburg.

FM 956 was designated on November 23, 1948, on the current route.

== FM 957 ==
Farm to Market Road 957
- Location: Lavaca and Fayette counties
- Length: 20.96 mi (33.73 km)
- Existed: 1948–present

Farm to Market Road 957 (FM 957) is located in Lavaca and Fayette counties. It runs from US 77 in Hallettsville to US 90 in Schulenburg. There is a spur connection in Breslau.

FM 957 was designated on November 23, 1948, to run from US 77 in Hallettsville northwest 3.7 miles (6.0 km). On May 23, 1951, the road was extended north to Breslau. On December 17, 1952, the road was extended north to Moravia, with 0.4 miles (0.64 km) of the old route to Breslau redesignated as a spur connection on May 17, 1955. On November 25, 1958 (connecting section designated October 31), the road was extended northeast to US 90, replacing FM 1292.

== FM 958 ==
Farm to Market Road 958
- Location: Lavaca County
- Length: 2.95 mi (4.75 km)
- Existed: 1948–present

Farm to Market Road 958 (FM 958) is located in Lavaca County. It runs from SH 95 west to FM 966.

FM 958 was designated on November 23, 1948, to run from SH 95 west and north 3.9 miles (6.3 km) to a road intersection. On May 24, 1962, a section was transferred to FM 966 when that road was extended north.

== FM 959 ==
Farm to Market Road 959
- Location: Panola County
- Length: 14.924 mi (24.018 km)
- Existed: May 23, 1951–present

Farm to Market Road 959 (FM 959) is located in Panola County. It runs from SH 43 northeast of Tatum to US 79.

FM 959 was designated on May 23, 1951, to run from SH 43 northeast of Tatum southeast along the old route of SH 149 to the new route near Beckville. On November 21, 1956, the road was extended south to US 79.

=== FM 959 (1948) ===
Farm to Market Road 959
- Location: Lavaca County
- Existed: November 23, 1948–July 14, 1949

A previous route numbered FM 959 was designated on November 23, 1948, from SH 295 south of Hallettsville to Ezzell. FM 959 was cancelled on July 14, 1949, and became a portion of FM 531.

== FM 960 ==
Farm to Market Road 960

Route information
- Maintained by TxDOT
- Length: 10.901 mi (17.543 km)
- Existed: November 23, 1948–present

Major junctions
- South end: I-69 BL / Bus. US 59 near El Campo
- Future I-69 / US 59; FM 961
- North end: FM 102 at Glen Flora

Location
- Country: United States
- State: Texas
- Counties: Wharton

Highway system
- Highways in Texas; Interstate; US; State; Former; Toll; Loops; Spurs; FM/RM; Park; Rec
← FM 959	→ FM 961

Farm to Market Road 960 (FM 960) is a state highway in the U.S. state of Texas that stays within Wharton County. The two-lane road starts at Future Business Interstate 69 (Future Bus. I-69)/Business U.S. Route 59-S (Bus 59) northeast of El Campo, goes in a northerly direction through farmlands and ends at FM 102 at Glen Flora.

== FM 961 ==
Farm to Market Road 961

Route information
- Maintained by TxDOT
- Length: 14.134 mi (22.746 km)
- Existed: November 23, 1948–present

Major junctions
- East end: SH 71 in New Taiton
- FM 960; Future I-69 / US 59 near Wharton
- West end: I-69 BL / Bus. US 59 near Wharton

Location
- Country: United States
- State: Texas
- Counties: Wharton

Highway system
- Highways in Texas; Interstate; US; State; Former; Toll; Loops; Spurs; FM/RM; Park; Rec
← FM 960	→ RM 962

Farm to Market Road 961 (FM 961) is a state highway in the U.S. state of Texas that remains within Wharton County. The two-lane road starts at State Highway 71 (SH 71) in New Taiton, heads east through farmlands and oil fields and ends at Future Business Interstate 69/U.S. Business Route 59 southwest of Wharton.

== RM 962 ==
Ranch to Market Road 962
- Location: Llano and Blanco counties
- Length: 22.786 mi (Note: The certified length given is shorter than the actual mileage as the TxDOT description of RM 962 considers it to be discontinuous at US 281.) (36.671 km)
- Existed: November 23, 1948 (Note: RM 962 was previously designated as FM 962 from 1948 to 1955.)–present

Ranch to Market Road 962 (RM 962) is located in Llano and Blanco counties. Its western terminus is at SH 71 near Horseshoe Bay in Llano County. RM 962 runs southward into Blanco County to an intersection with RM 3347, where it turns to the southeast. It reaches the town of Round Mountain, where it has a short overlap with US 281. Beyond Round Mountain, RM 962 continues to run southeast and then south before turning towards the east in Cypress Mill. State maintenance and the RM 962 designation end at the Travis County line, with the roadway continuing as Hamilton Pool Road (which eventually transitions into RM 3238) towards western Austin.

RM 962 was designated as Farm to Market Road 962 (FM 962) in Blanco County on November 23, 1948, running from US 281 in Round Mountain to Cypress Mill. On August 24, 1955, the designation was changed to RM 962, and the highway was extended into Llano County to RM 93 (now SH 71). On August 31, 1965, RM 962 was extended to the Blanco–Travis county line, and a spur connection, RM Spur 962, to Cypress Mill was added.

Junction list

County	Location	mi	km	Destinations	Notes
Llano		0.0	0.0	SH 71 – Llano, Austin	
Blanco		2.9	4.7	RM 3347 west	
Blanco	Round Mountain	10.5	16.9	US 281 north – Marble Falls	West end of US 281 overlap
Blanco	Round Mountain	10.7	17.2	US 281 south – Johnson City	East end of US 281 overlap
Blanco		17.7	28.5	RM Spur 962 west	
Blanco–Travis county line		23.0	37.0	Hamilton Pool Road	
1.000 mi = 1.609 km; 1.000 km = 0.621 mi

== RM 963 ==
Ranch to Market Road 963
- Location: Burnet County
- Length: 27.597 mi (44.413 km)
- Existed: November 23, 1948 (Note: RM 963 was previously designated as FM 963 from 1948 to 1956.)–present

Ranch to Market Road 963 (RM 963) is located in Burnet County.

RM 963 begins at an intersection with US 281 in Burnet. The highway travels east along Graves Street before turning towards the north at Shady Grove Road. After leaving the city limits of Burnet, RM 963 travels through rural areas of the county in a generally northeast direction. Near RM 2340, the highway turns into a more eastward direction and crosses over the North Fork San Gabriel River. RM 963 turns back towards the north near County Road 210 and runs parallel to Rocky Creek from US 183 to the highway's terminus at FM 2657 near Oakalla.

RM 963 was designated on November 23, 1948, as Farm to Market Road 963 (FM 963), running from US 281 northeast 12.9 miles (20.8 km). On November 20, 1951, the highway was extended to a point 6.1 miles (9.8 km) to the northeast. On March 31, 1955, FM 963 was extended northeast 3.8 miles (6.1 km) miles to Watson. On April 12, 1955, the road was extended northeast to Oakalla, replacing FM 1321. On October 1, 1956, the FM 963 designation was changed to RM 963. The highway was extended to Briggs on May 6, 1964. On June 6, 1967, the section of highway from Oakalla to Briggs was transferred to FM 2657.

Junction list

The entire route is in Burnet County.

Location	mi	km	Destinations	Notes
Burnet	0.0	0.0	US 281 – Marble Falls, Lampasas	
	7.2	11.6	RM 2340 north – Lake Victor	
	10.7	17.2	FM 1174 south – Bertram	
	20.0	32.2	US 183 – Lampasas, Austin	
Oakalla	27.6	44.4	FM 2657 – Briggs, Copperas Cove	
1.000 mi = 1.609 km; 1.000 km = 0.621 mi

== FM 964 ==
Farm to Market Road 964
- Location: Bell County
- Length: 1.136 mi (1.828 km)
- Existed: October 31, 1958–present

Farm to Market Road 964 (FM 964) is located in Bell County. It runs from FM 485 south to Cyclone.

FM 964 was designated on October 31, 1958, on the current route; at the time the north end was at FM 2269 instead of FM 485.

=== FM 964 (1948) ===
Farm to Market Road 964
- Location: Guadalupe and Caldwell counties
- Existed: November 23, 1948–April 18, 1958

A previous route numbered FM 964 was designated on November 23, 1948, from SH 80 at Fentress northeast 3.4 miles (5.5 km). On July 14, 1949, the road was extended north 2.4 miles (3.9 km). On June 21, 1951, the road was extended to PR 10. On July 20, 1953, the road was extended northeast to US 183 in Lockhart, replacing a 2 miles (3.2 km) section of PR 10. On September 29, 1954, the road was extended southwest to the Guadalupe County line. On October 21, 1954, the road was extended to FM 621 near Staples, replacing FM 1981. FM 964 was cancelled on April 18, 1958, and transferred to FM 20, although the route remained signed as FM 964 until the 1959 travel map was released.

== RM 965 ==
Ranch to Market Road 965
- Location: Gillespie and Llano counties
- Length: 25.26 mi (40.65 km)
- Existed: November 23, 1948 (Note: RM 965 was previously designated as FM 965 from 1948 to 1956.)–present

Ranch to Market Road 965 (RM 965) is located in Gillespie and Llano counties.

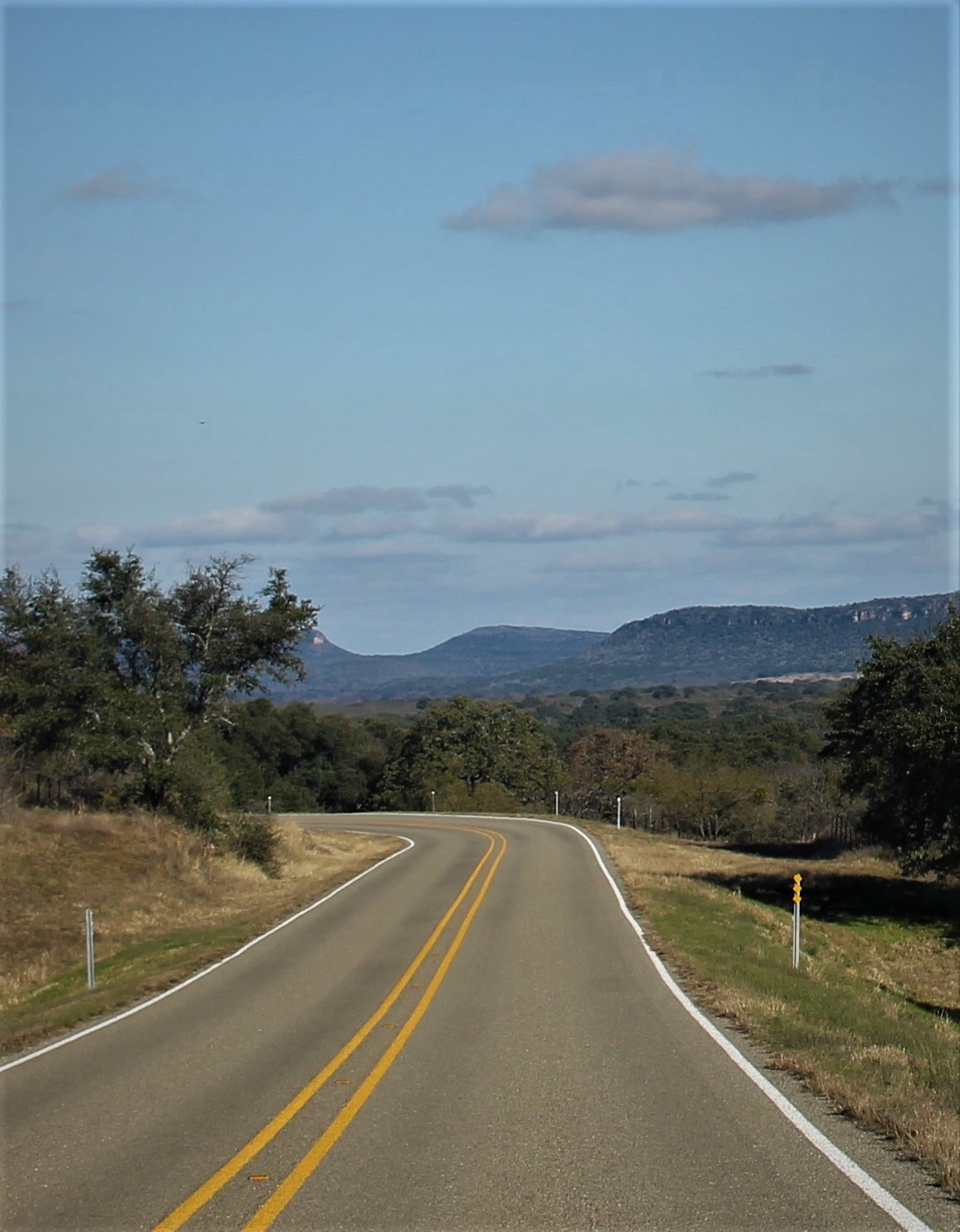
Ranch to Market 965 about Enchanted Rock

RM 965 begins at an intersection with US 87/US 290 in Fredericksburg. The highway runs northeast along Milam Street and turns north before leaving the city limits. RM 965 runs through rural areas of Gillespie County, running pass many farms and ranches and zigzags through hilly terrain before entering the town of Crabapple. North of Crabapple, the highway passes by the Enchanted Rock State Natural Area. Near Enchanted Rock, RM 965 turns northeast and enters Llano County before ending at an intersection with SH 16.

RM 965 was designated on November 23, 1948, as Farm to Market Road 965 (FM 965), running north from US 87/US 290 11.8 miles (19.0 km) to a point near Crab Apple Creek. On October 1, 1956, the FM 965 designation was changed to RM 965. On October 31, 1957, RM 965 was extended northward to Enchanted Rock. On May 2, 1962, the highway was extended northeast to its current terminus at SH 16.

== FM 966 ==
Farm to Market Road 966
- Location: Lavaca and DeWitt counties
- Length: 8.891 mi (14.309 km)
- Existed: July 28, 1955–present

Farm to Market Road 966 (FM 966) is located in Lavaca and DeWitt counties. It runs from SH 111 in Petersville to SH 95.

FM 966 was designated on July 28, 1955, to run from FM 958 to SH 111. On May 24, 1962 (connecting section designated May 2), the road was extended north to SH 95, replacing a section of FM 958 and all of FM 2719.

=== FM 966 (1948) ===
Farm to Market Road 966
- Location: Hays County
- Existed: November 23, 1948–May 25, 1955

A previous route numbered FM 966 was designated on November 23, 1948, from FM 12 near Dripping Springs to Driftwood. On November 20, 1951, the road was extended southeast to FM 1078 at Hays City. FM 966 was cancelled on May 25, 1955, and became a portion of FM 150 (now RM 150).

== RM 967 ==
Ranch to Market Road 967
- Location: Hays County
- Length: 15.201 mi (24.464 km)
- Existed: October 1, 1956 (Note: RM 967 was previously designated as FM 967 from 1948 to 1956.)–present

Ranch to Market Road 967 (RM 967) is located in Hays County.

RM 967 begins at an intersection with RM 1826 near the town of Driftwood. The highway travels eastward and passes by a rural subdivision before traveling through less developed areas of the county. RM 967 intersects FM 1626 just south of Hays, before entering the city limits of Buda. The highway turns towards the south and turns southeast before intersecting Main Street (former Loop 4). RM 967 runs south on Main Street before ending at the southbound frontage road of I-35.

RM 967 was designated on November 23, 1948, as Farm to Market Road 967 (FM 967) and ran from Loop 4 to a point 3.2 miles (5.1 km) northwest of Loop 4. On July 14, 1949, the highway was extended 1.6 miles (2.6 km) to Carpenter. FM 967 was extended again on October 28, 1953, adding another 6.0 miles (9.7 km). On August 24, 1954, FM 967 was extended to a road intersection (current RM 1826). On October 1, 1956, the FM 967 designation was changed to RM 967. On May 27, 2004, RM 967 was extended to I-35, absorbing the southern half of Loop 4.

Junction list

The entire route is in Hays County.

Location	mi	km	Destinations	Notes
	0.0	0.0	RM 1826 – Driftwood	
	9.1	14.6	FM 1626 – Hays, Kyle	
Buda	12.2	19.6	Main Street	Former Loop 4 north
Buda	12.4	20.0	FM 2770 south (Jack C. Hays Trail) – Mountain City	
Buda	15.2	24.5	I-35	I-35 exit 217
1.000 mi = 1.609 km; 1.000 km = 0.621 mi

== FM 968 ==
Farm to Market Road 968
- Location: Harrison County
- Length: 18.352 mi (29.535 km)
- Existed: May 23, 1951–present

Farm to Market Road 968 (FM 968) is located in Harrison County. It runs from US 80, 3.3 miles (5.3 km) west of Marshall, west to the Gregg County line.

FM 968 was designated on May 23, 1951, to run from US 80 southwestward 15.8 miles (25.4 km). On November 20, 1951, the road was extended west to the Gregg County line.

=== FM 968 (1948) ===
Farm to Market Road 968
- Location: Llano County
- Existed: November 23, 1948–July 14, 1949

A previous route numbered FM 968 was designated on November 23, 1948, from SH 29 west of Llano to Valley Spring. This was part of the cancelled SH 81 in 1939. FM 968 was cancelled on July 14, 1949, and became a portion of FM 386 (now RM 386). This became part of FM 734 in 1952, and subsequently SH 71 on September 1, 1965.

== FM 969 ==
Farm to Market Road 969

Route information
- Maintained by TxDOT
- Length: 28.954 mi (46.597 km)
- Existed: November 23, 1948–present

Major junctions
- West end: Loop 111 in Austin
- US 183; SH 130 Toll
- East end: SH 21 / SH 71 near Bastrop

Location
- Country: United States
- State: Texas

Highway system
- Highways in Texas; Interstate; US; State; Former; Toll; Loops; Spurs; FM/RM; Park; Rec
← FM 968	→ FM 970

Farm to Market Road 969 (FM 969) is a 28.95-mile (46.59 km) farm-to-market road located in Travis and Bastrop counties in the U.S. state of Texas.

== FM 970 ==
Farm to Market Road 970
- Location: Williamson County
- Length: 8.061 mi (12.973 km)
- Existed: 1948–present

Farm to Market Road 970 (FM 970) is located in Williamson County.

The western terminus of FM 970 is at US 183. The road passes through the community of Andice before turning to the north-northwest. FM 970 curves to the east-northeast again before crossing Berry Creek. The road again turns north-northwest, then east-northeast, and crosses into Florence before reaching its eastern terminus at SH 195.

FM 970 was designated November 23, 1948, along the current route.

== FM 971 ==
Farm to Market Road 971
- Location: Williamson County
- Length: 23.818 mi (38.331 km)
- Existed: November 23, 1948 (Note: FM 971 was cancelled from November 26, 1958 to July 28, 1959.)–present

Farm to Market Road 971 (FM 971) is located in Williamson County. It runs from Spur 158 north of Georgetown east via Weir and Granger to Friendship.

FM 971 was designated on November 23, 1948, from SH 95 in Granger to Friendship. FM 971 was cancelled on November 26, 1958, and transferred to FM 972. On July 28, 1959, the section of FM 972 from its pre-1958 east end east of Walburg to SH 95 was cancelled, so the section of FM 972 east of SH 95 was changed back to FM 971. On June 2, 1967, the road was extended west to Loop 418 (later Business I-35, now Spur 158) north of Georgetown, replacing the 5.0 miles (8.0 km)-mile FM 2983 on the eastern section and the 5.8 miles (9.3 km)-mile FM 2606 on the western section, and 6.3 miles (10.1 km) connecting the sections.

== FM 972 ==
Farm to Market Road 972
- Location: Williamson County
- Length: 13.685 mi (22.024 km)
- Existed: November 23, 1948–present

Farm to Market Road 972 (FM 972) is located in Williamson County. It runs from I-35 north of Georgetown east via Walburg to SH 95 north of Granger.

FM 972 was designated on November 23, 1948, from US 81 (now I-35) north of Georgetown via Walburg to a road intersection east of Walburg, for a total distance of 5.0 miles (8.0 km). On October 31, 1958, the road was extended east to Granger. On November 26, 1958, the road was extended further east to Friendship, replacing FM 971. On July 28, 1959, the section from 5.0 miles (8.0 km) east of US 81 east to SH 95 in Granger was cancelled and the section from SH 95 in Granger east 7.0 miles (11.3 km) to Friendship was redesignated back to FM 971. On November 24, 1959, the road was extended 9.2 miles (14.8 km) east on a new route to SH 95.

== FM 973 ==
Farm to Market Road 973

Route information
- Maintained by TxDOT
- Length: 34.499 mi (Note: The certified length given is shorter than the actual mileage, as the TxDOT description of FM 973 considers it to be discontinuous at rather than concurrent with FM 812, SH 71, and Loop 212.) (55.521 km)
- Existed: 1948–present

Major junctions
- South end: US 183
- SH 71 near Austin-Bergstrom International Airport; SH 130 Toll; US 290 in Manor
- North end: US 79 in Taylor

Location
- Country: United States
- State: Texas
- Counties: Travis, Williamson

Highway system
- Highways in Texas; Interstate; US; State; Former; Toll; Loops; Spurs; FM/RM; Park; Rec
← FM 972	→ FM 974

Farm to Market Road 973 (FM 973) is a farm-to-market road in Travis and Williamson counties in the U.S. state of Texas.

== FM 974 ==
Farm to Market Road 974
- Location: Brazos County
- Length: 22.1 mi (35.6 km)
- Existed: November 23, 1948–present

Farm to Market Road 974 (FM 974), is located in Brazos County. It runs from SH 6 and US 190 in Bryan, northeastward to SH 21 and US 190, 1.5 miles (2.4 km) southwest of the Madison County line. It is known locally as Tabor Road.

FM 974 was designated on November 23, 1948, from US 190 (present-day SH 21) north of Bryan to Tabor. On September 20, 1961, the designation was extended east to FM 2037 and FM 2038. On October 13, 1961, FM 974 was extended to US 190, replacing FM 2037. On June 27, 1995, the section from SH 21 to US 190/SH 6 was redesignated Urban Road 974 (UR 974). The designation of that section reverted to FM 974 with the elimination of the Urban Road system on November 15, 2018. On July 31, 2025, the section from SH 21 to US 190/SH 6 was redesignated as FM 823, due to one-way conversion of the US 190/SH 6 feeder road.

Junction list

The entire route is in Brazos County.

Location	mi	km	Destinations	Notes
Bryan			SH 6 / US 190 (Earl Rudder Frwy) – Hearne, College Station	Interchange; future I-14
			FM 2223	
			FM 2776	
			FM 2038	
			Macey Rd	
			SH 21 / US 190 – Bryan, Madisonville	
1.000 mi = 1.609 km; 1.000 km = 0.621 mi

== FM 975 ==
Farm to Market Road 975
- Location: Burleson County
- Length: 6.221 mi (10.012 km)
- Existed: 1948–present

Farm to Market Road 975 (FM 975) is located in Burleson County.

FM 975's northern terminus is in Caldwell at SH 21. Within city limits, it is also known as Banks Street. Upon passing over the Union Pacific Railroad tracks, the route curves southward and continues for another 5.5 miles (8.9 km) before state maintenance ends at an intersection with County Road 125. The roadway continues as County Road 126.

FM 975 was designated on November 23, 1948, on its current route.

== FM 976 ==
Farm to Market Road 976
- Location: Burleson County
- Length: 3.942 mi (6.344 km)
- Existed: November 23, 1948–present

Farm to Market Road 976 is located in Burleson County. It runs from SH 36 to FM 60.

FM 976 was designated on November 23, 1948 from SH 36, 8 miles south of Caldwell, west to near Birch. On January 18, 1955 the road was extended southwest 0.4 mile, replacing a portion of FM 111, but this extension was transferred back to FM 111 (now FM 60) on May 25, 1962.

== FM 977 ==
Farm to Market Road 977
- Location: Leon County
- Length: 27.179 mi (43.740 km)
- Existed: November 23, 1948–present

Farm to Market Road 977 is located in Leon County. It runs from FM 3 near US 79 to FM 1119.

FM 977 was designated on November 23, 1948 from FM 39 at Flynn to an intersection with US 75 (now IH 45) at Leona. On December 16, 1948 the route was extended west to US 79 southwest of Marquez and the route was extended east and southeast 6 miles (9.7 km) from Leona to Spiller's Store. On May 5, 1966 the road was extended northeast 2.4 miles to FM 1119. On July 16, 1970 the section from US 79 to a point 5.2 miles south was transferred to FM 3, although this did not take effect until 1971.

== FM 978 ==
Farm to Market Road 978
- Location: Madison County
- Length: 12.419 mi (19.986 km)
- Existed: November 23, 1948–present

Farm to Market Road 978 is located in Madison County. It runs from FM 39 to US 190.

FM 978 was designated on November 23, 1948 from US 75 (now US 190) in Madisonville northwest to Mecca. On July 14, 1949 the road was extended northwest 2.6 miles (4.2 km) to FM 39.

== FM 979 ==
Farm to Market Road 979
- Location: Milam and Robertson counties
- Length: 43.318 mi (69.714 km)
- Existed: November 23, 1948–present

Farm to Market Road 979 is located in Milam and Robertson counties. It runs from FM 485 west of Mayfield to SH 7.

FM 979 was designated on November 23, 1948 from SH 6 at Calvert to FM 392 (now FM 46) near Owensville. On October 29, 1953 the road was extended west 5 miles (8.0 km) to the Brazos River Bridge. On December 30, 1959 the road was extended northeast 17.7 miles (28.5 km) to SH 7, replacing a section of FM 2293 and all of FM 2514 and creating a concurrency with FM 46. On August 5, 1966 the road was extended southwest 11.1 miles to US 190 (now FM 485) west of Mayfield, replacing FM 2347.

== FM 980 ==
Farm to Market Road 980
- Location: Walker and San Jacinto counties
- Length: 36.130 mi (58.146 km)
- Existed: November 23, 1948–present

Farm to Market Road 980 is located in Walker and San Jacinto counties. It runs from FM 247 northeast and east to Lake Livingston. There is a spur connection to Trinity River Authority Park Site #20.

FM 980 was designated on November 23, 1948 from FM 247, 3 miles north of Huntsville to SH 45 (now SH 19) at Riverside. On October 23, 1950, the road was extended 0.3 mile into Riverside. On October 31, 1957 the road was extended southeast 4.3 miles to a road intersection near Gospel Hill School. On May 6, 1969 the road was extended east 17 miles to US 190 (now SH 156). The same day the road was extended south 1.4 mile (replacing a section of FM 1909, which was cancelled) to Lake Livingston and two spur connections were added. On May 29, 1985 the spur connection to Trinity River Authority Park Site #7 was renumbered FM 135.

== FM 981 ==
Farm to Market Road 981
- Location: Collin and Fannin counties
- Length: 13.119 mi (21.113 km)
- Existed: November 23, 1948–present

Farm to Market Road 981 is located in Collin and Fannin counties.

FM 981 was designated on November 23, 1948 from SH 78 at Blue Ridge to Pike. On March 26, 1953 the road was extended 6.1 miles to US 69, replacing FM 1751.

== FM 982 ==
Farm to Market Road 982
- Location: Collin County
- Length: 8.368 mi (13.467 km)
- Existed: November 23, 1948–present

Farm to Market Road 982 is located in Collin County.

FM 982 was designated on November 23, 1948 from SH 24 (now US 380) near Princeton to near Branch. On July 11, 1968 the road was extended south 3 miles.

== FM 983 ==
Farm to Market Road 983
- Location: Ellis County
- Length: 7.959 mi (12.809 km)
- Existed: November 23, 1948–present

Farm to Market Road 983 is located in Ellis County. It runs from US 75 (now IH 45) at Ferris to FM 813 east of Rockett.

FM 983 was designated on November 23, 1948 on the current route.

== FM 984 ==
Farm to Market Road 984
- Location: Ellis County
- Length: 13.247 mi (21.319 km)
- Existed: November 23, 1948–present

Farm to Market Road 984 is located in Ellis County. It runs from FM 877 at Howard to Rankin.

FM 984 was designated on November 23, 1948 from SH 34 at Bardwell to Rankin. On July 15, 1949 the road was extended 4.7 miles northwest from Bardwell, creating a concurrency with SH 34. On May 2, 1962 the road was extended northwest 2.3 miles to FM 877.

== FM 985 ==
Farm to Market Road 985
- Location: Ellis County
- Length: 7.322 mi (11.784 km)
- Existed: November 23, 1948–present

Farm to Market Road 985 is located in Ellis County, It runs from FM 984 east of Rankin to SH 34.

FM 985 was designated on November 23, 1948 from FM 984 east of Rankin to a point 2 miles southeast. On May 5, 1966 the road was extended northeast and northwest 5.4 miles via Byrd to SH 34.

== FM 986 ==
Farm to Market Road 986
- Location: Kaufman County
- Length: 8.60 mi (13.84 km)
- Existed: 1948–present

Farm to Market Road 986 (FM 986) is located in Kaufman County.

FM 986 begins at an intersection with US 80 in Terrell and runs north along Rockwall Avenue then turns northeast on State Street before turning back north on Poetry Road. The highway leaves Terrell and runs in a generally north direction before turning northeast near County Road 246. FM 986 then intersects FM 1565 in Poetry, then continues to run northeast before ending at an intersection with County Road 2326.

FM 986 was designated on November 23, 1948, running north from SH 205 to a point approximately 7.5 miles (12.1 km) to the northeast. On July 25, 1960, the highway was extended southward to US 80 when SH 205 was rerouted.

== FM 987 ==
Farm to Market Road 987
- Location: Kaufman County
- Length: 7.539 mi (12.133 km)
- Existed: 1948–present

Farm to Market Road 987 (FM 987) is located in Kaufman County.

FM 987 begins at an intersection with SH 243 in Kaufman, running north on Jefferson Street before turning left onto Pyle Street and leaving the town. The highway travels in a generally northward direction through Post Oak Bend City before turning northwest. FM 987 intersects FM 2578 and continues to run northwest before ending at an intersection with FM 148 near Talty.

FM 987 was designated on November 23, 1948, running from US 175 (current SH 243) in Kaufman to FM 148 near Talty along its current route.

== FM 988 ==
Farm to Market Road 988
- Location: Erath County
- Length: 2.025 mi (3.259 km)
- Existed: August 1, 1967–present

Farm to Market Road 988 is located in Erath County. It runs from FM 8 in the northwestern part of Stephenville to US 67/US 377. The road is known locally as Northwest Loop.

FM 988 was designated on August 1, 1967 on the current route.

=== FM 988 (1948) ===
Farm to Market Road 988
- Location: Kaufman County
- Existed: November 23, 1948–November 1, 1961

A previous route numbered FM 988 was designated on November 23, 1948, from SH 274 south of Kemp, west 4.9 miles (7.9 km). On July 15, 1949, a 3.7-mile (6.0 km) section from Peeltown to the then-terminus of FM 988 was added. FM 988 was cancelled on November 1, 1961 and transferred to FM 148.

== FM 989 ==
Farm to Market Road 989
- Location: Bowie County
- Length: 11.834 mi (19.045 km)
- Existed: 1948–present

Farm to Market Road 989 (FM 989), known locally as Kings Highway, is located in Bowie County. It is mostly located to the west of Texarkana. It travels approximately 11.8 miles (19.0 km) south to north.

FM 989 was originally designated on November 23, 1948, with a northern terminus at US 82 in Nash and a southern terminus at US 59, approximately 0.5 miles (0.80 km) southwest of the Loop, a total length of 4.2 miles (6.8 km). However, on October 28, 1953, it was extended to include a 5.4-mile (8.7 km) loop and connect with FM 559 northwest of Texarkana. On September 20, 1961, FM 989 was extended again, picking up an additional 3.1 miles (5.0 km) on the south end, to connect to FM 2516. On June 27, 1995, the entire route of FM 989 was transferred to Urban Road 989. On November 21, 2013, a 0.3-mile (0.48 km) section of FM 989 west of FM 2878 was turned over to the city of Texarkana and FM 989 was rerouted on a new route south of FM 559. The old route of FM 989 south of FM 559 became a section of FM 2878. The designation reverted to FM 989 with the elimination of the Urban Road system on November 15, 2018.

Junction list

The entire route is in Bowie County.

Location	mi	km	Destinations	Notes
	0.0	0.0	FM 2516 (Buchanan Loop Road)	Southern terminus; roadway continues as South Kings Highway
	1.2	1.9	FM 3527 north	Southern terminus of FM 3527
	2.9	4.7	Future I-369 / US 59 (South Lake Drive)	
Wake Village	4.9	7.9	US 67 (West 7th Street)	
Nash	6.9	11.1	US 82 (New Boston Road)	
Nash	7.6	12.2	I-30	I-30 exit 219; I-30 east is accessed from the frontage road
Texarkana	11.7	18.8	FM 559 (Richmond Road)	Northern terminus; roadway continues as Big Oak Lane
1.000 mi = 1.609 km; 1.000 km = 0.621 mi

== FM 990 ==
Farm to Market Road 990
- Location: Bowie County
- Length: 14.058 mi (22.624 km)
- Existed: November 23, 1948–present

Farm to Market Road 990 is located in Bowie County. It runs from US 67 in Bassett to FM 1840 in De Kalb.

FM 990 was designated on November 23, 1948 from US 67 in Bassett to FM 561. On June 10, 1965 the road was extended north 10.2 miles to FM 1840 southeast of De Kalb, replacing FM 2553.

== FM 991 ==
Farm to Market Road 991
- Location: Bowie County
- Length: 8.63 mi (13.89 km)
- Existed: November 21, 1956–present

Farm to Market Road 991 (FM 991) is located in Bowie County.

FM 991 was designated on November 21, 1956, from US 67 westward and southward to US 67 in Redwater. On June 28, 1963, it was extended south 1.8 miles (2.9 km) from US 67.

=== FM 991 (1948) ===
Farm to Market Road 991
- Location: Bowie County
- Existed: November 23, 1948–November 21, 1956

A previous route numbered FM 991 was designated on November 23, 1948, from US 82 northwest to Daniel's Chapel School. On November 21, 1956, this FM 991 was cancelled and combined with FM 992, and the current FM 991 was created in the same county.

== FM 992 ==
Farm to Market Road 992
- Location: Bowie County
- Length: 24.377 mi (39.231 km)
- Existed: November 23, 1948–present

Farm to Market Road 992 (FM 992) is a 24.377-mile (39.231 km) state road in Red River County that connects FM 44 (southwest of De Kalb) with US 82 in New Boston.

FM 992 was designated on November 23, 1948, to run from US 82 in De Kalb northeast to Bethlehem School. On May 23, 1951, the road was extended northeast to Macedonia School. On November 21, 1956, the road was extended southeast to US 82 in New Boston, replacing FM 991. On October 30, 1958, the road was extended south over the old route of SH 26 (now US 259) to the new route. The route was later reconfigured to end at FM 44 instead of US 259.

== FM 993 ==
Farm to Market Road 993
- Location: Camp and Upshur counties
- Length: 11.877 mi (19.114 km)
- Existed: November 23, 1948–present

Farm to Market Road 993 is located in Camp and Upshur counties.

FM 993 was designated on November 23, 1948 from SH 11 in Pittsburg to FM 593 at Ewell. On December 17, 1952 the road was extended 1.9 miles from La Fayette to FM 593, replacing Spur 232; the old route to Ewell was transferred to FM 1975.

== FM 994 ==
Farm to Market Road 994
- Location: Cass County
- Length: 3.132 mi (5.040 km)
- Existed: November 23, 1948–present

Farm to Market Road 994 is located in Cass County. It runs from Bryan's Mill to SH 77 west of Douglassville.

FM 994 was designated on November 23, 1948 on the current route.

== FM 995 ==
Farm to Market Road 995
- Location: Cass County
- Length: 18.966 mi (30.523 km)
- Existed: November 23, 1948–present

Farm to Market Road 995 is located in Cass County.

FM 995 was designated on November 23, 1948 from SH 8 at Red Mill east to SH 77 west of Atlanta. On November 21, 1956 the road was extended 8.6 miles to FM 130 southeast of Carterville, replacing FM 785.

== FM 996 ==
Farm to Market Road 996
- Location: Grayson County
- Length: 2.021 mi (3.252 km)
- Existed: October 31, 1958–present

Farm to Market Road 996 (FM 996) is located in Grayson County.

FM 996 begins at an intersection with FM 120 in Pottsboro. The highway runs south through the town as Grayson Street before turning east at Hagerman Road and leaves the town just east of Cardinal Lane. FM 996 continues to run east before ending at an intersection with FM 1417.

The current FM 996 was designated on October 31, 1958 from FM 120 to FM 1417 as a replacement of a section of FM 131. On May 6, 1964, the highway was extended further west a distance of 6.4 miles (10.3 km). This section was cancelled when FM 120 was relocated with the completion of the northern extension of SH 289 on December 17, 2009.

=== FM 996 (1948) ===
Farm to Market Road 996
- Location: Cass County
- Existed: November 23, 1948–May 6, 1952

The original FM 996 was designated on November 23, 1948 from SH 43 to FM 125. FM 996 was cancelled on May 6, 1952 and transferred to FM 248.

== FM 997 ==
Farm to Market Road 997
- Location: Morris County
- Length: 3.788 mi (6.096 km)
- Existed: November 23, 1948–present

Farm to Market Road 997 is located in Morris County.

FM 997 was designated on November 23, 1948 from SH 26 (now US 259) near Jenkins to the Lone Star Steel Company Dam. On August 28, 1958 the section from the dam to a point 0.3 mile north was removed from the highway system because it was not in use by the public as it dead-ended at the dam as well as Lone Star Steel planning to build an airstrip over it.

== FM 998 ==
Farm to Market Road 998
- Location: Hartley County
- Length: 24.468 mi (39.377 km)
- Existed: December 17, 1952–present

Farm to Market Road 998 is located in Hartley County. It runs from US 54 at Wagner (southwest of Dalhart) to US 87 at Hartley.

FM 998 was designated on December 17, 1952 on the current route.

=== FM 998 (1948) ===
Farm to Market Road 998
- Location: Panola County
- Existed: November 23, 1948–January 7, 1952

A previous route numbered FM 998 was designated on November 23, 1948, from FM 123, 5.0 miles (8.0 km) south of DeBerry, east to the Louisiana state line. FM 998 was cancelled on January 7, 1952 and transferred to FM 123.

== FM 999 ==
Farm to Market Road 999
- Location: Panola County
- Length: 15.933 mi (25.642 km)
- Existed: November 23, 1948–present

Farm to Market Road 999 (FM 999) is located in Panola County. It runs from FM 1971 to US 59.

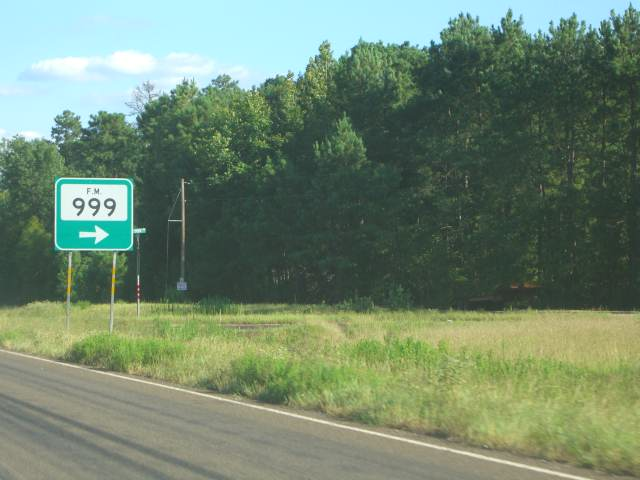
Guide sign along US 59 at the eastern terminus of FM 999

FM 999 was designated on November 23, 1948, from SH 181 at Gary southwest 5.2 miles (8.4 km). On June 29, 1950, the road was extended to US 59, replacing SH 181. On November 1, 1967, a break in the route was added at FM 1970. On November 4, 1971, the road was extended 2.5 miles (4.0 km) west to a road intersection. On November 3, 1972, FM 999 was extended to FM 1971.
