= Farm to Market Road 960 =

Road in Texas, United States

Farm to Market Road 960

Route information
- Maintained by TxDOT
- Length: 10.901 mi (17.543 km)
- Existed: November 23, 1948–present

Major junctions
- South end: I-69 BL / Bus. US 59 near El Campo
- Future I-69 / US 59; FM 961
- North end: FM 102 at Glen Flora

Location
- Country: United States
- State: Texas
- Counties: Wharton

Highway system
- Highways in Texas; Interstate; US; State; Former; Toll; Loops; Spurs; FM/RM; Park; Rec
← FM 959	→ FM 961

Farm to Market Road 960 (FM 960) is a state highway in the U.S. state of Texas that stays within Wharton County. The two-lane road starts at Future Business Interstate 69 (Future Bus. I-69)/Business U.S. Route 59-S (Bus 59) northeast of El Campo, goes in a northerly direction through farmlands and ends at FM 102 at Glen Flora.

== Route description ==
FM 960 begins at Future Bus. I-69/Bus 59 northeast of El Campo and heads to the northeast. Within a short distance the highway crosses Future Interstate 69 (Future I-69)/U.S. Route 59 (US 59) at an overpass. Connections with Future I-69/US 59 are complex. Southbound Future I-69/US 59 traffic desiring to access FM 960 must exit to a feeder road and then use a special connecting road. Northbound Future I-69/US 59 traffic can use the Future Bus. I-69/Bus 59 exit to access FM 960. To enter Future I-69/US 59 northbound, FM 960 traffic must take Future Bus. I-69/Bus 59 north. To enter Future I-69/US 59 southbound, FM 960 traffic can use the special connecting road to the feeder, which leads to an entrance ramp. From Future Bus. I-69/Bus 59, FM 960 heads to the northwest for 2.0 miles (3.2 km) before turning to the northeast. After an additional 5.2 miles (8.4 km) the highway comes to an intersection with FM 961 at the Wharton County Youth Fair Grounds. From the fair grounds to the end of FM 960 at FM 102 in Glen Flora is 3.7 miles (6.0 km). In the last stretch, the highway briefly turns sharply to the southeast before veering back to the northeast and crossing the Colorado River.

== History ==
FM 960 was originally designated on November 23, 1948 to start at what is now Future I-69/US 59 a distance of 1.4 miles (2.3 km) northeast of El Campo in Wharton County. From there the highway was to go north via Crescent School a total of 9.7 miles (15.6 km) to a road intersection near the Colorado River. On July 14, 1949, FM 960 was extended about 1.5 miles (2.4 km) across the Colorado River to Glen Flora. On June 30, 1976 the old US 59 right-of-way was redesignated Loop 525. On April 25, 1997, Loop 525 was canceled and its right-of-way transferred to Bus 59-S.

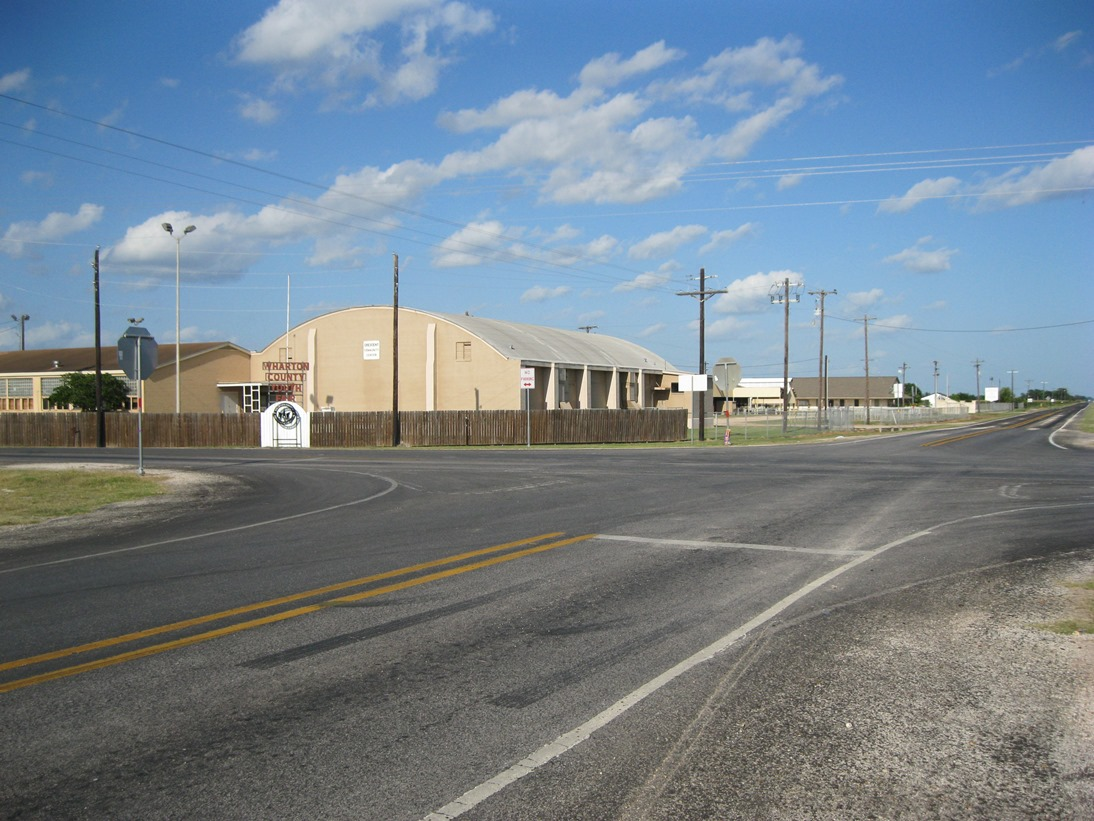
Wharton County Youth Fair is at the FM 960 and FM 961 junction. The view is southeast on FM 961.

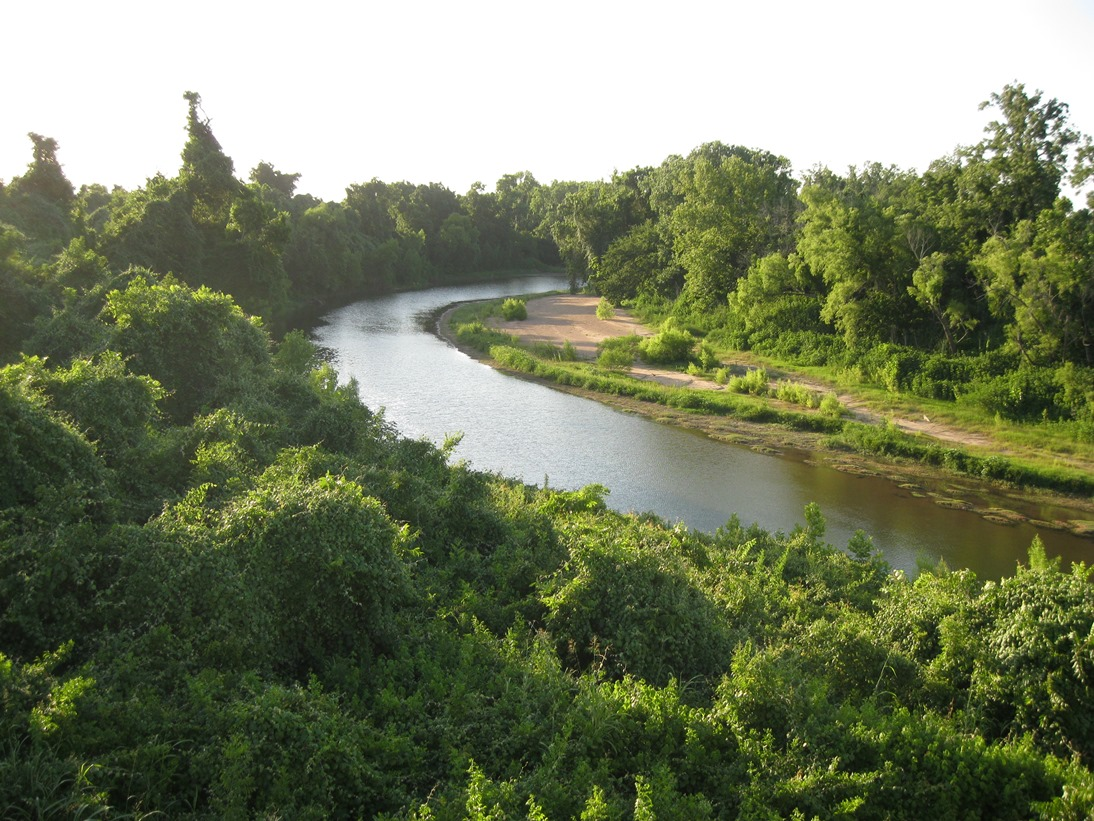
FM 960 crosses the Colorado River at Glen Flora. The view is upstream or northwest.

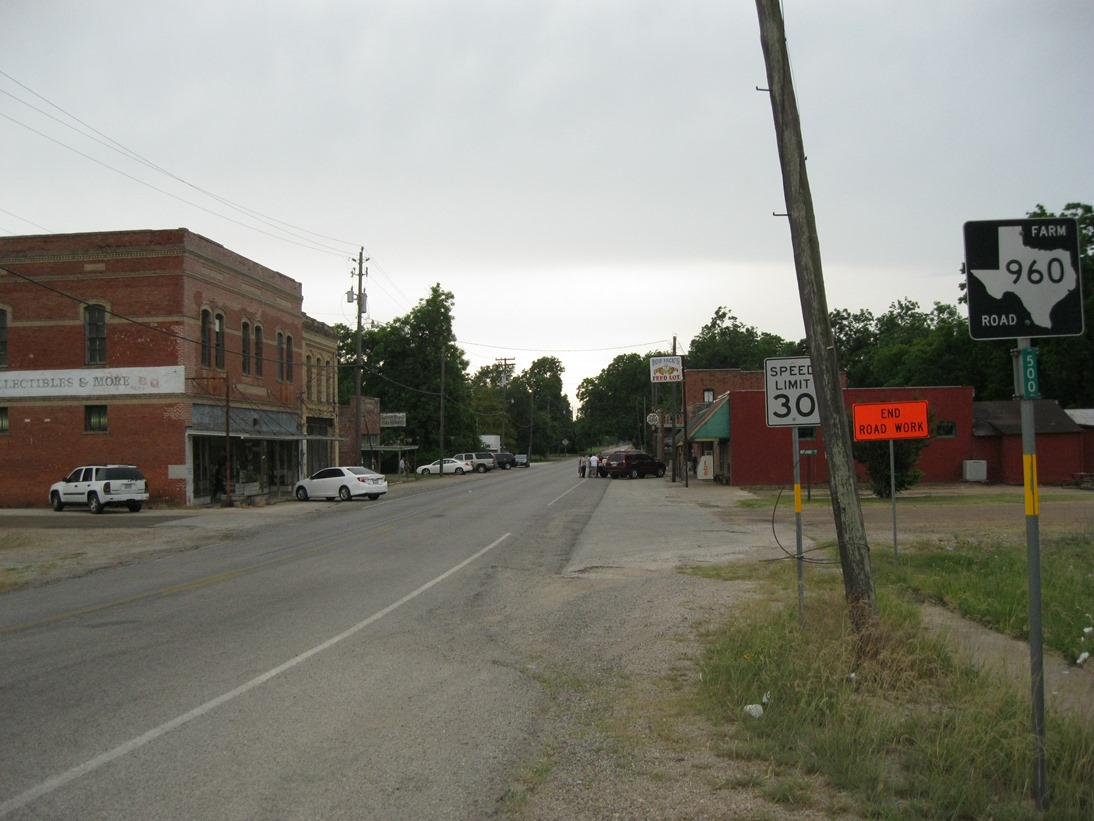
The northern end of FM 960 is at Glen Flora where there are a few businesses and a post office.

== Major intersections ==
The entire highway is in Wharton County.

Location	mi	km	Destinations	Notes
	0.0	0.0	I-69 BL / Bus. US 59 – El Campo	Southern terminus of FM 960
	0.1	0.16	Future I-69 / US 59 – El Campo, Wharton, Houston	I-69/US 59 exit 67; U.S. 59 is the future Interstate 69
	7.2	11.6	FM 961 – New Taiton, Wharton	
Glen Flora	10.9	17.5	FM 102 – Eagle Lake, Wharton	Northern terminus of FM 960
1.000 mi = 1.609 km; 1.000 km = 0.621 mi
