= Glen Flora =

Glen Flora may refer to the following places in the United States:

- Glen Flora, Wisconsin
- Glen Flora, Texas
