= Farm to Market Road 961 =

Road in Texas, United States

Farm to Market Road 961

Route information
- Maintained by TxDOT
- Length: 14.134 mi (22.746 km)
- Existed: November 23, 1948–present

Major junctions
- East end: SH 71 in New Taiton
- FM 960; Future I-69 / US 59 near Wharton
- West end: I-69 BL / Bus. US 59 near Wharton

Location
- Country: United States
- State: Texas
- Counties: Wharton

Highway system
- Highways in Texas; Interstate; US; State; Former; Toll; Loops; Spurs; FM/RM; Park; Rec
← FM 960	→ RM 962

Farm to Market Road 961 (FM 961) is a state highway in the U.S. state of Texas that remains within Wharton County. The two-lane road starts at State Highway 71 (SH 71) in New Taiton, heads east through farmlands and oil fields and ends at Future Business Interstate 69/U.S. Business Route 59 southwest of Wharton.

== Route description ==
FM 961 begins at a stop sign on SH 71 in front of the Taiton Community Center at New Taiton and heads directly east. County Road 370 goes straight west from the same intersection. Near Saint John Nepomucene Catholic Church, the highway turns to the northeast before going east. Near New Taiton, the highway pursues a winding route through an area with several oil wells. After going a short distance east, FM 961 again veers northeast before turning back to the east. The highway heads northeast before coming to a sharp curve to the southeast. After passing Boys Pond Road, the highway turns into a generally easterly course. At a distance 8.1 miles (13.0 km) from New Taiton, FM 961 intersects with FM 960 at right angles. The Wharton County Youth Fair Grounds are situated on the northeast corner of the crossroads which are controlled by a four-way stop sign.

From the fair grounds until its end, FM 961 goes in a straight line to the southeast past several more oil wells. After continuing 5.9 miles (9.5 km) from the FM 960 junction, the highway comes to the Future I-69/US 59 underpass. FM 961 can be accessed via an exit ramp for southbound Future I-69/US 59 traffic. There is an entrance ramp from FM 961 to northbound Future I-69/US 59. To access southbound Future I-69/US 59, a traveler must continue southeast 0.1 miles (0.16 km) to Future Business I-69/Business US 59 and turn right. A left turn will take one northeast on Future Business I-69/Business US 59 into Wharton.

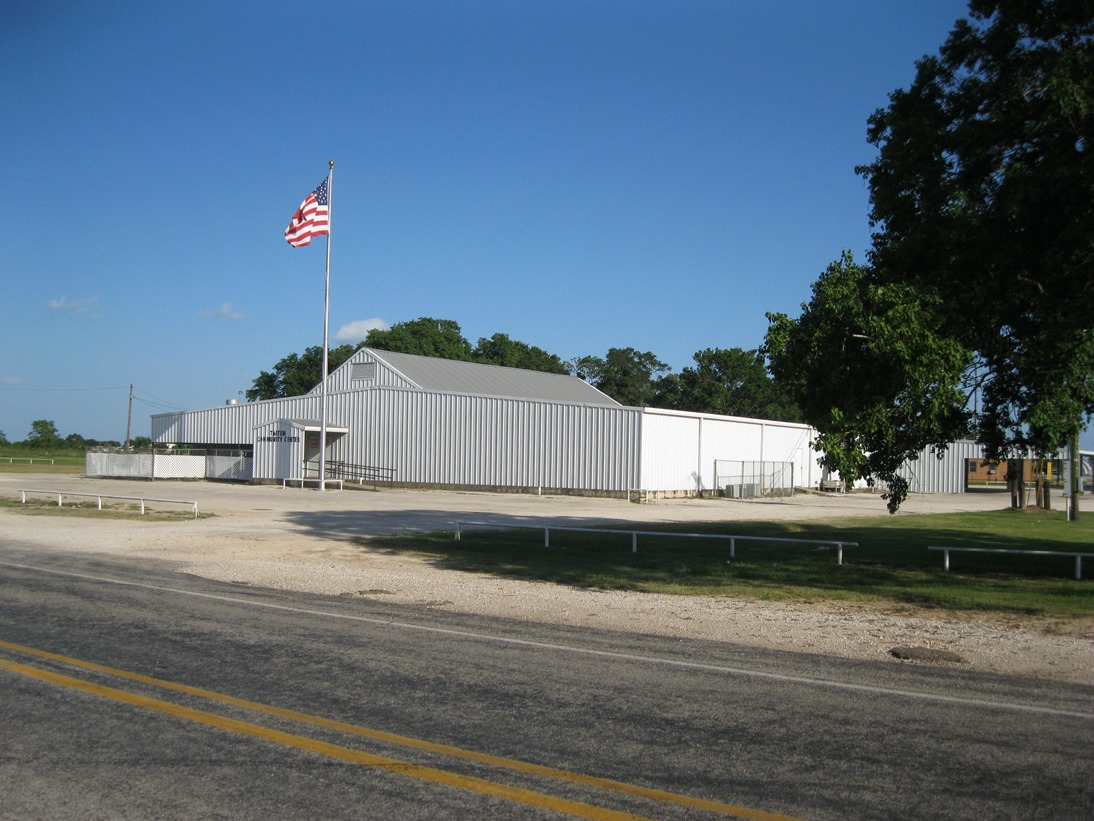
Taiton Community Center is located at Highway 71 and FM 961 in New Taiton.

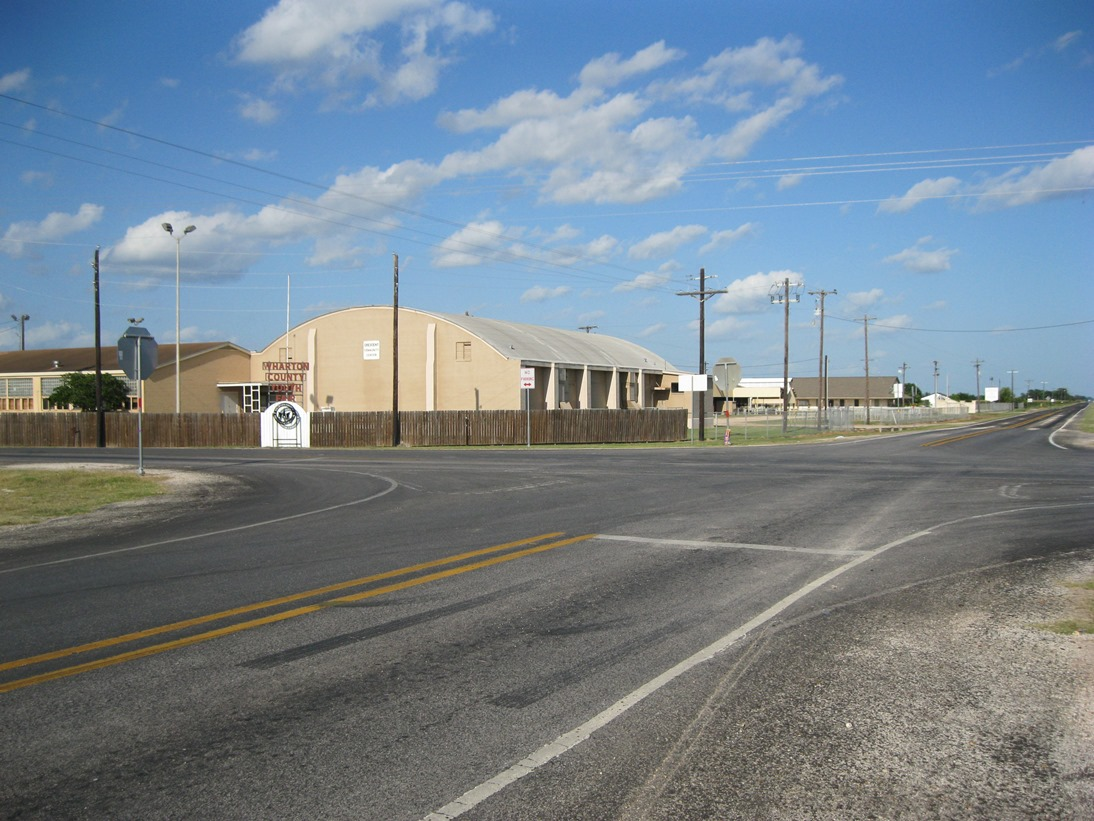
Wharton County Youth Fair is at the intersection of FM 960 and FM 961.

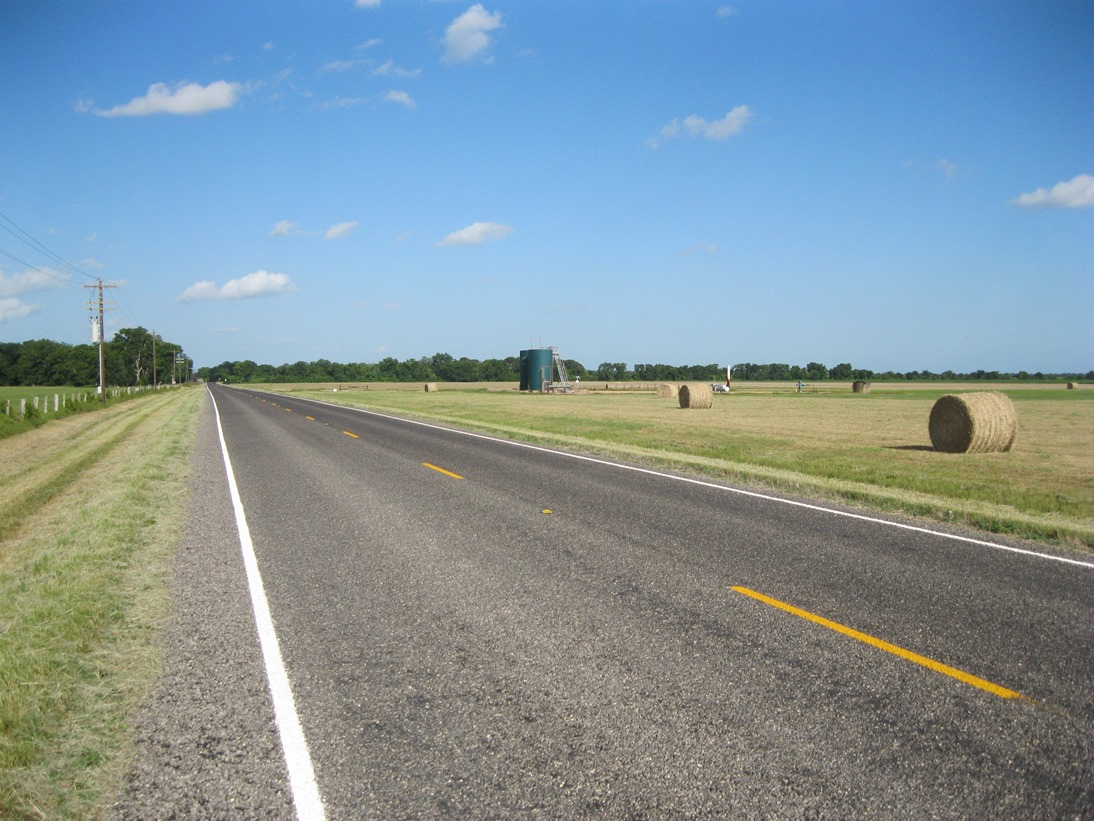
Baled hay and oil tanks can be seen along the eastern portion of FM 961.

== History ==
FM 961 was originally designated on November 23, 1948 to start at US 59 a distance of 2.0 miles (3.2 km) southwest of Wharton in Wharton County and go west about 6.2 miles (10.0 km) to the Crescent School at FM 960. On September 29, 1954 the highway was extended approximately 8.9 miles (14.3 km) to SH 71 in New Taiton. On June 30, 1976, the eastern end of FM 961 was redesignated as State Loop 183. On November 20, 1998, State Loop 183 was discontinued and its right-of-way was transferred to Business I-69/Business US 59.

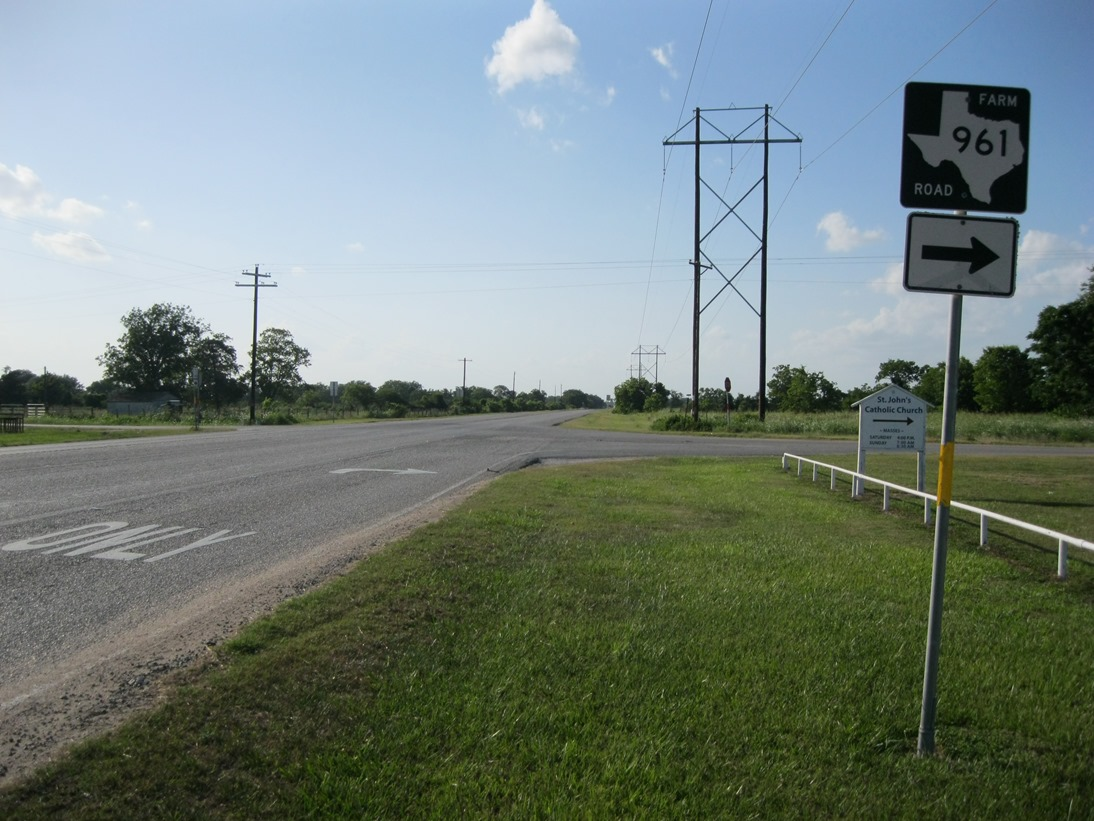
FM 961 begins at Highway 71 in New Taiton. County Road 370 is the road going left.

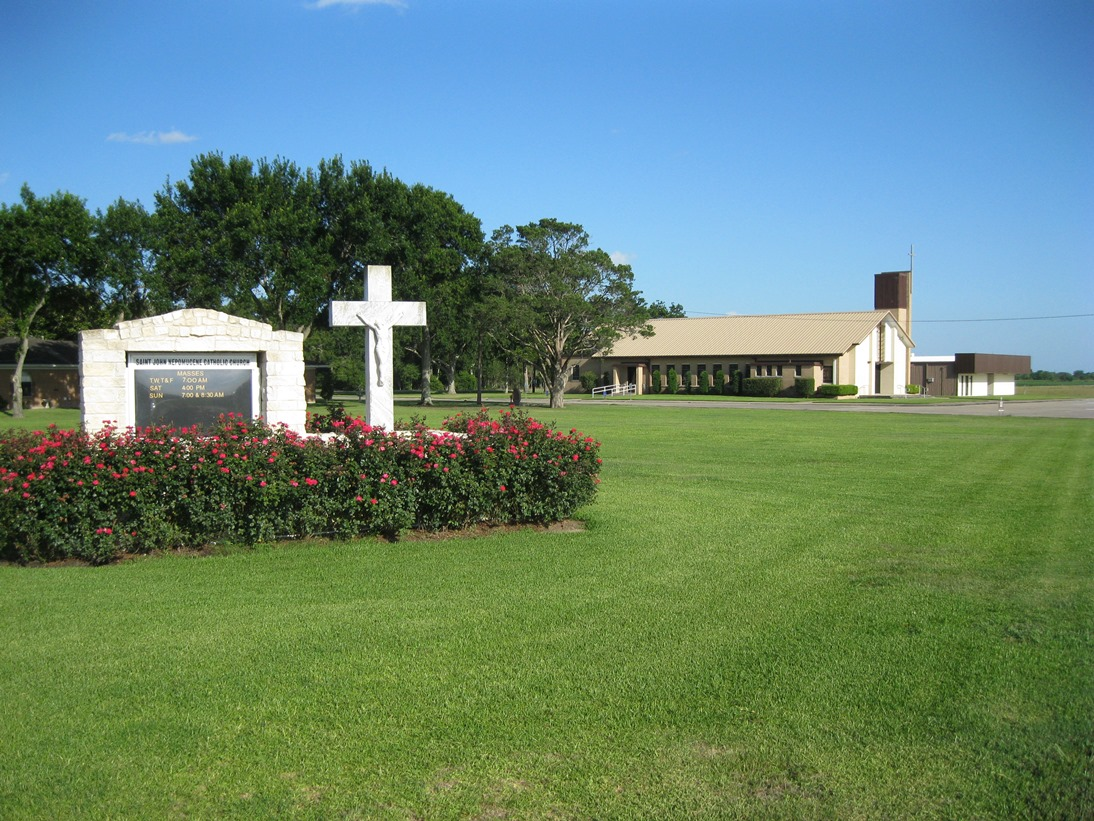
St John Nepomucene Catholic Church is on the south side of FM 961 in New Taiton.

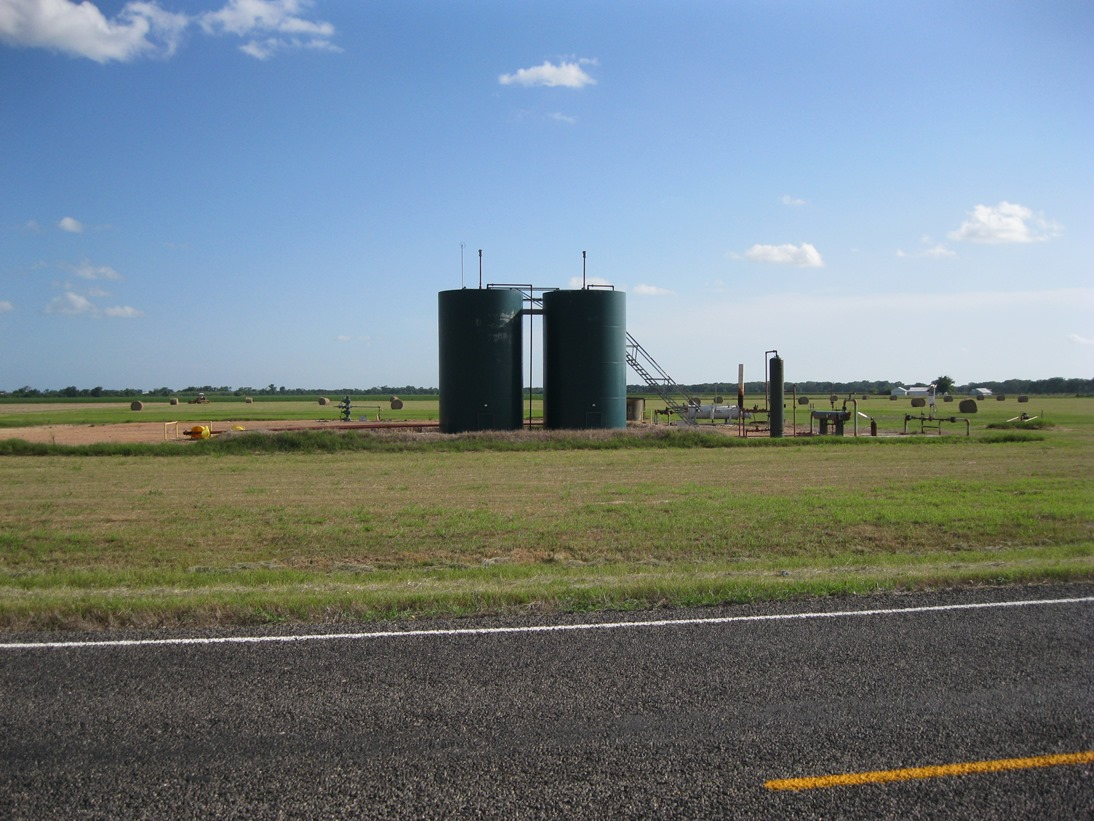
Oil well is one of several along FM 961. This lease is 1.2 miles northwest of Future I-69/US 59.

== Major intersections ==
The entire highway is in Wharton County.

Location	mi	km	Destinations	Notes
New Taiton	0.0	0.0	SH 71 – El Campo, Columbus	Western terminus of FM 961
	8.1	13.0	FM 960 – Glen Flora	
Wharton	14.0	22.5	Future I-69 / US 59 – El Campo, Rosenberg, Houston	I-69 exit 73; U.S. 59 is the future Interstate 69
Wharton	14.1	22.7	I-69 BL / Bus. US 59	Eastern terminus of FM 961
1.000 mi = 1.609 km; 1.000 km = 0.621 mi
