= Taiton, Texas =

- unincorporated area
- Location within the state of Texas Taiton, Texas (the United States)
- Coordinates: 29°22′28″N 96°22′40″W
- Country: United States
- State: Texas
- County: Wharton
- Elevation: 135 ft (41 m)
- Time zone: UTC-6 (Central (CST))
  - Summer (DST): UTC-5 (CDT)
- ZIP code: 77442
- Area code: 979

Taiton or Tait or York was an unincorporated area in northwest Wharton County, Texas, United States. The one-time community was located 5 miles (8.0 km) north of New Taiton on State Highway 71 (SH 71). Taiton's population peaked around 1910 but then went into decline. At some time, Taiton either moved south to New Taiton or was replaced by that community. Unlike New Taiton, Taiton is not identified by road signs, not shown on maps and not served by any Farm-to-market road. The additional fact that there are very few homes in the area suggests that Taiton has become a ghost town.

== History ==
Taiton is described as being located on SH 71, a distance of 5 miles (8.0 km) north of New Taiton. The region was first settled by Anglo-Americans in 1886. However, numbers of German and Czech immigrants arrived in 1894, looking for land to cultivate near El Campo. The community was first named Tait, but the name was changed to Taiton in 1896 when the post office was established. In 1901, Ignace Jurasek contributed land for a new schoolhouse to replace the old one. B. E. Medina opened a general store and there was a dance hall by 1903. The school reported 75 students and one teacher in 1905. Taiton's farmers raised cattle, corn, cotton, rice and watermelons. When the population climbed to 800 in 1910, the town included a dry-goods store, a produce buyer and some grocers. St. John Nepomucene Catholic Church was founded in 1912.

Taiton's population declined after 1915. The school counted two teachers and 104 white and four black pupils in 1926, but only 20 people lived in the community. The post office closed sometime in the 1930s. In 1936, New Taiton showed up on a county map with a church, a factory and some homes. In the 1940s the Taiton school merged with the Rancho Grande community school and moved to a new location. Taiton had 80 residents in 1947 and included the church, school and two stores. Taiton is not marked at its historic location on the 1965 USGS Hahn Quadrangle, though the tiny community of Hahn is on the map. In the 1960s, the Taiton area stretched across 35 square miles and had 325 residents.

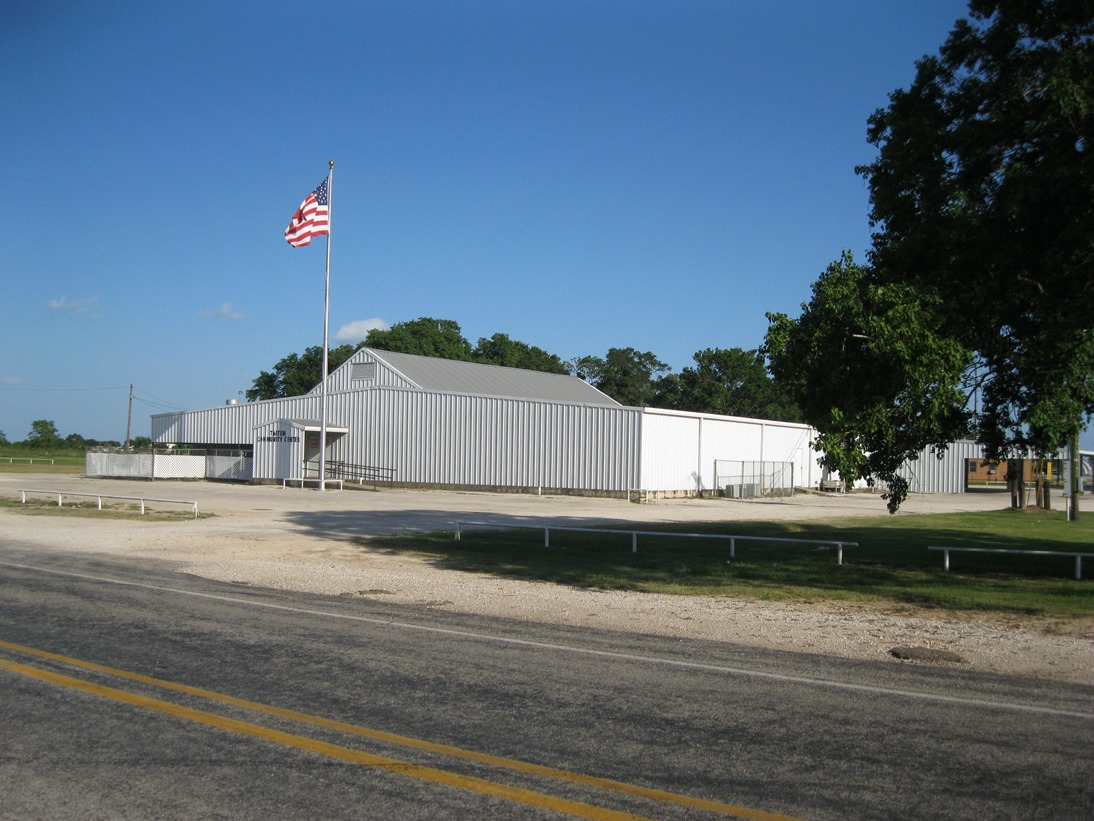
Taiton Community Center is located to the south at Hwy 71 and FM 961 in New Taiton.

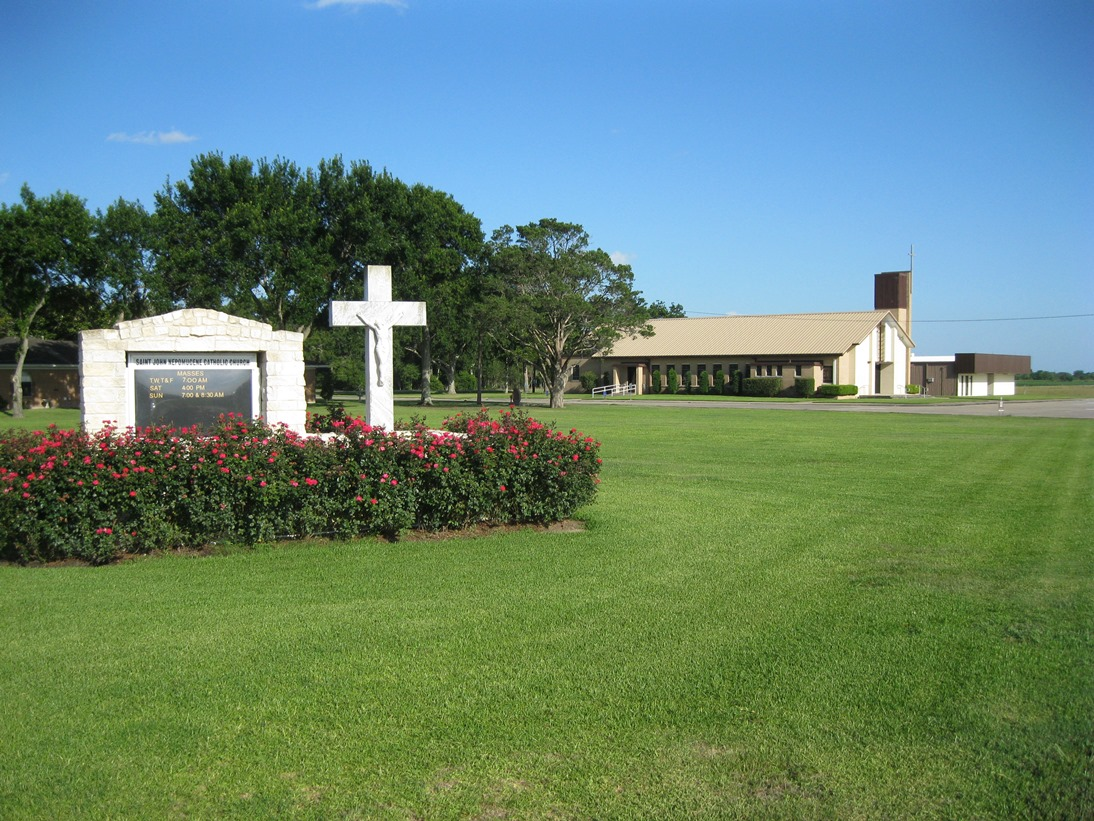
St John Nepomucene Catholic Church can be found on FM 961 in New Taiton.
