= Oakalla, Texas =

Unincorporated community in Burnet County, Texas, United States

- Unincorporated community
- Location within Texas Location within the United States
- Coordinates: 30°59′11″N 97°55′31″W
- Country: United States
- State: Texas
- County: Burnet
- Elevation: 807 ft (246 m)
- Time zone: UTC-6 (Central (CST))
  - Summer (DST): UTC-5 (CDT)
- Area codes: 512 & 737
- GNIS feature ID: 1364301

Oakalla is an unincorporated community in Burnet County, Texas, United States. According to the Handbook of Texas, the community had an estimated population of 45 in 2000.

== Education ==
It continues to be served by Lampasas ISD today, with elementary students attending Hanna Springs Elementary in Lampasas.
