= New Taiton, Texas =

- Unincorporated community
- Location within the state of Texas New Taiton, Texas (the United States)
- Coordinates: 29°18′34″N 96°20′30″W
- Country: United States
- State: Texas
- County: Wharton
- Elevation: 135 ft (41 m)
- Time zone: UTC-6 (Central (CST))
  - Summer (DST): UTC-5 (CDT)
- ZIP code: 77437
- Area code: 979

New Taiton is an unincorporated community in northwestern Wharton County, Texas, United States. The community is situated at the intersection of State Highway 71 (SH 71) and Farm to Market Road 961, (FM 961) north-northwest of El Campo, Texas. New Taiton is identified by road signs on SH 71 and FM 961. The area around the community is intensively farmed and several oil and gas wells are located nearby.

== History ==
The community of New Taiton is described as being 5 miles (8.0 km) south of Taiton at the junction of SH 71 and FM 961. The area was first settled by Americans in 1886, but in 1894 it received an influx of Czech and German immigrants looking for farmland near El Campo. The community was first named Tait, but it was renamed Taiton in 1896 when the first post office was opened. In 1901, Ignace Jurasek donated land for a new schoolhouse to replace the original one. By 1903, B. E. Medina opened a general store, and a dance hall was built. Two years later the school enrolled 75 students and one teacher. Besides raising cattle, local farmers grew corn, cotton, rice, and watermelons. In 1910, the population reached 800 and the town boasted a dry-goods store, a produce buyer, and a few grocers. The year 1912 saw the St. John Nepomucene Catholic Church established.

Taiton's population fell in the years after 1915. While the school had two teachers and 104 white and four black pupils in 1926, only 20 persons lived in the town. The post office closed in the 1930s. Meanwhile, New Taiton appeared on a county map in 1936 as a community with a church, a factory, and several homes. In the 1940s the Taiton school merged with the Rancho Grande community school and moved to a new location. By 1947, Taiton had 80 souls and included the church, school, and two stores. The communities of New Taiton and Jones Creek appear on the 1960 USGS map named New Taiton Quadrangle but Taiton is not marked on the map. The New Taiton Oil Field is located to the northeast of New Taiton near the Colorado River. By the 1960s, the Taiton area included 35 square miles and 325 residents. In the same decade, New Taiton had a cotton gin and three additional commercial establishments. By 1989, New Taiton included a church, a town hall, a factory, and four other businesses.

== Geography ==
New Taiton is located on SH 71, a distance of 8.9 miles (14.3 km) north-northwest of El Campo and 10.2 miles (16.4 km) south-southeast of Garwood. New Taiton is 17.0 miles (27.4 km) west of Wharton via FM 961 and Business U.S. Route 59. West Mustang Creek flows in a southerly direction, one or two miles to the west of the community. The Taiton Community Center can be found at the southeastern corner of SH 71 and FM 961. County Road 370 heads west from the intersection. Saint John Nepomucene Catholic Church and cemetery are a short distance east on FM 961. (Note: See photo of church.)

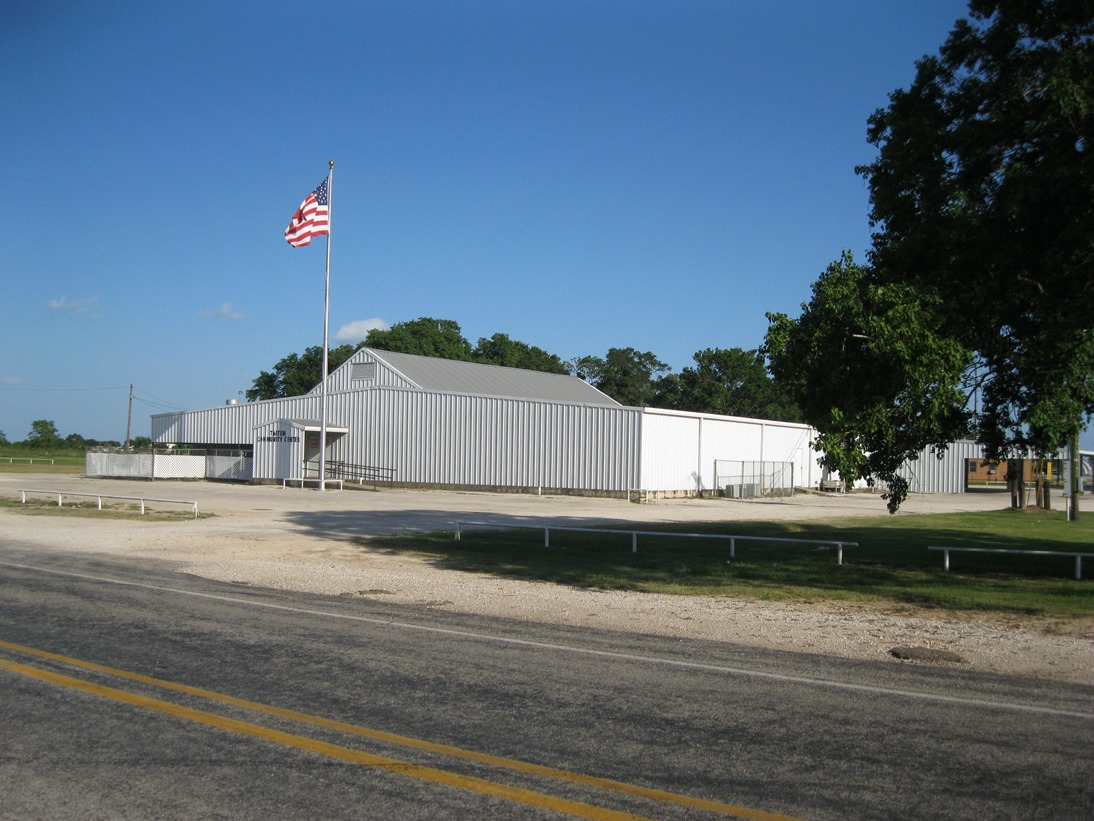
Taiton Community Center is at Hwy 71 and FM 961.

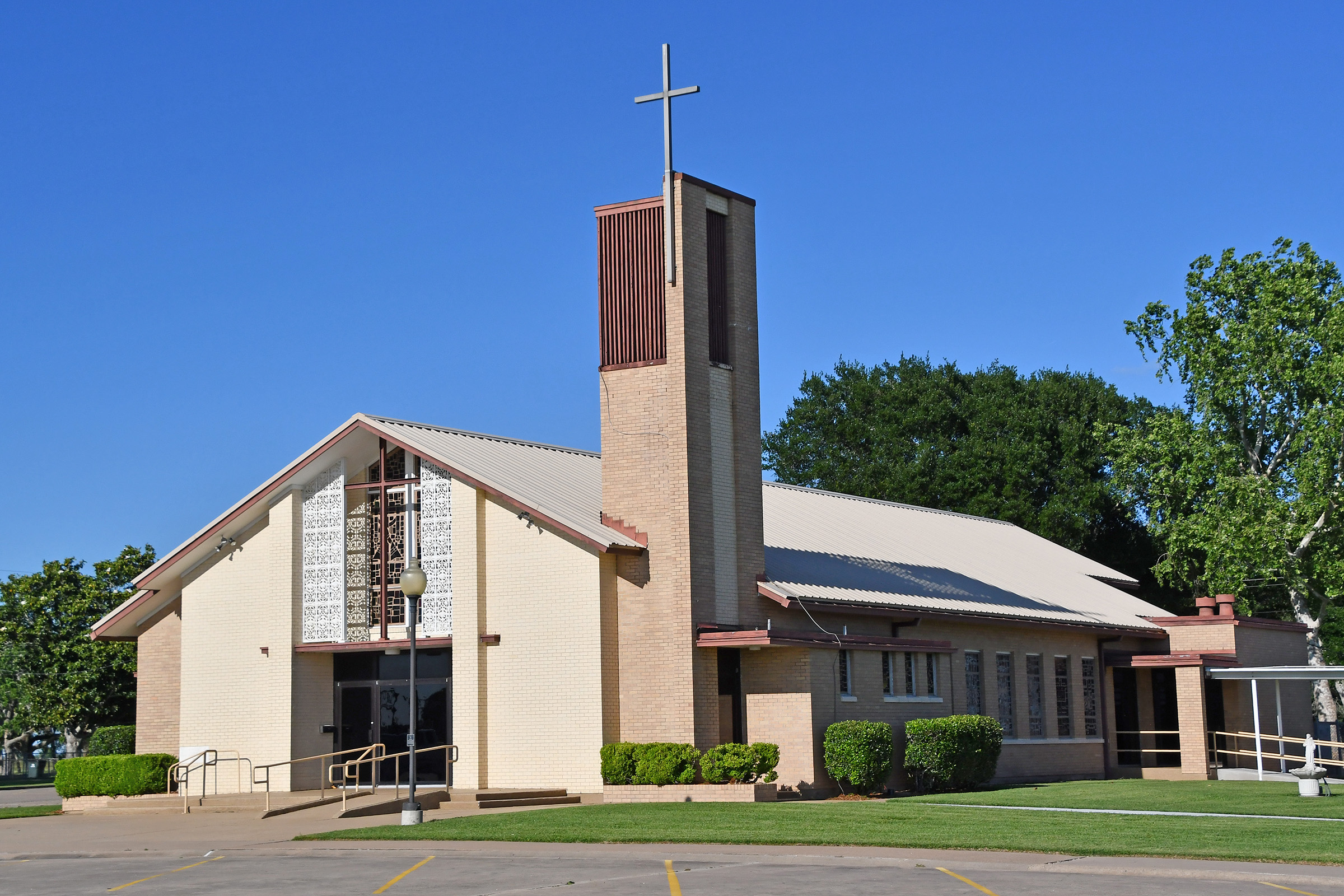
St John Nepomucene Catholic Church is on FM 961.

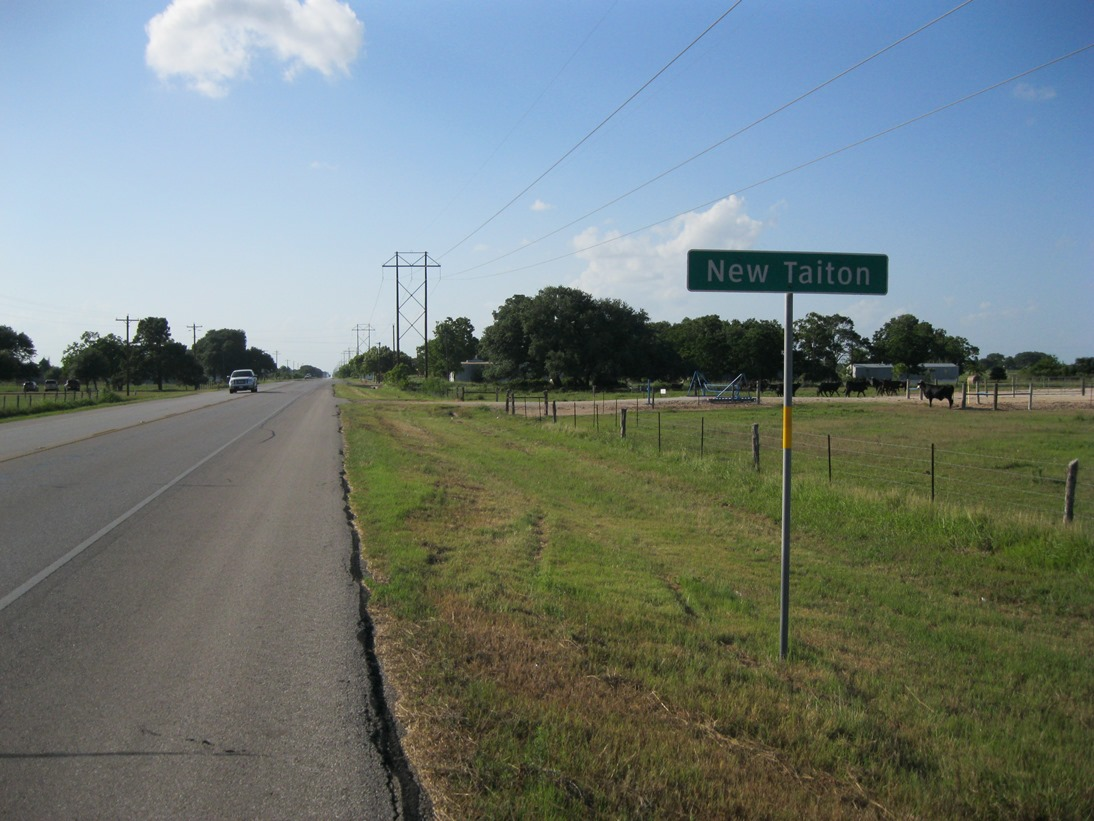
Community sign is on Hwy 71 looking north-northwest.

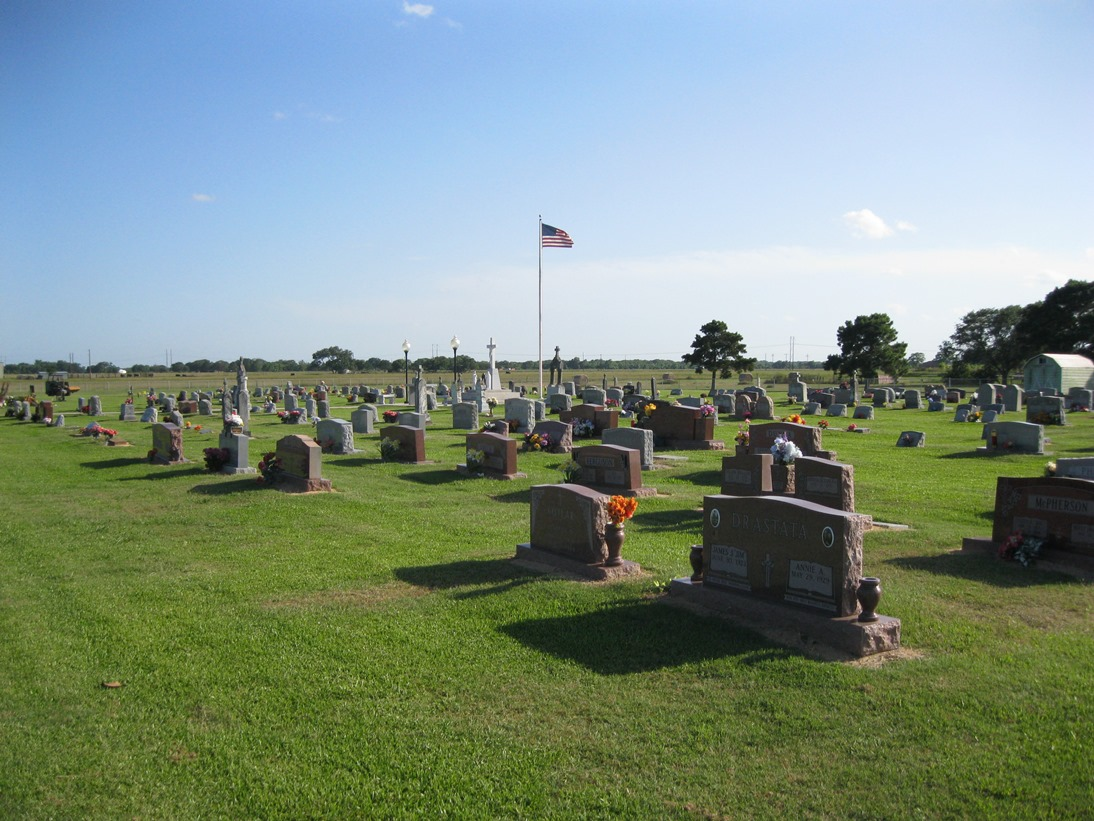
St John's Catholic Church cemetery is on FM 961.

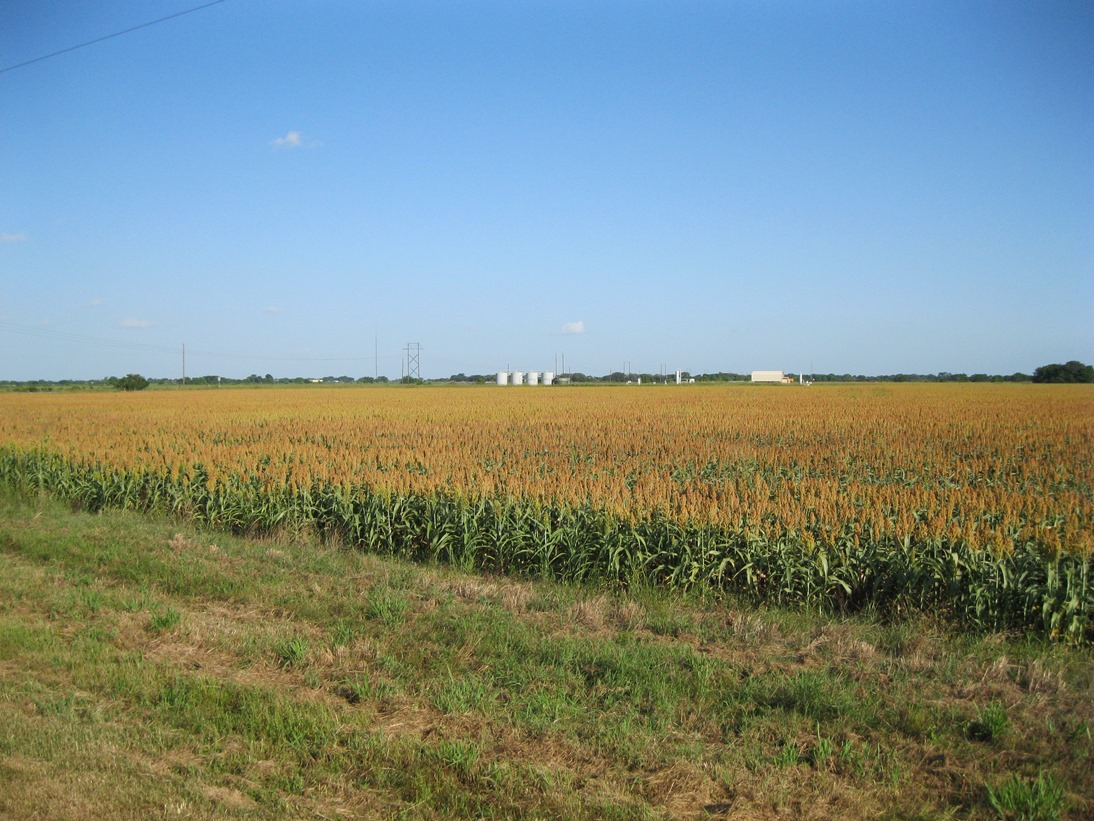
Crops are next to FM 1160 north of New Taiton. The four distant white tanks are on an oil lease.
