= Glen Flora, Texas =

- Unincorporated community
- Location within the state of Texas Glen Flora, Texas (the United States)
- Coordinates: 29°20′51″N 96°11′36″W
- Country: United States
- State: Texas
- County: Wharton
- Elevation: 118 ft (36 m)
- Time zone: UTC-6 (Central (CST))
  - Summer (DST): UTC-5 (CDT)
- ZIP code: 77443
- Area code: 979

Glen Flora is an unincorporated community in Wharton County, Texas, United States. According to the Handbook of Texas, the community had an estimated population of 210 in 2000. It is located within the Greater Houston metropolitan area.

On November 21, 1992, an F1 tornado destroyed several barns northeast of the community. Four homes were damaged by another tornado on November 23, 2004.

Glen Flora has a post office with the zip code 77443.

== Geography ==
It is located at the junction of FM 102 and FM 960, 6 miles (9.7 km) northwest of Wharton, 17 miles (27.4 km) south of Eagle Lake and 5 miles (8.0 km) south of the unincorporated community of Egypt.

== Education ==
Glen Flora School District was established sometime after 1900 and had 37 students and one teacher in 1905. There were two separate schools for Black children in the community. The school for White students joined the Crescent school district in 1948 until it became a part of the larger El Campo Independent School District. Both black schools soon came together as one and was named for principal Thomas Lane Pink. Starting in 1961, all students went to either El Campo or Wharton Independent School District after schools were desegregated.

== Notable people ==
- Harry H. Johnson, World War II soldier, was born in Glen Flora.
- Iris Kyle, professional female bodybuilder.

== Gallery ==
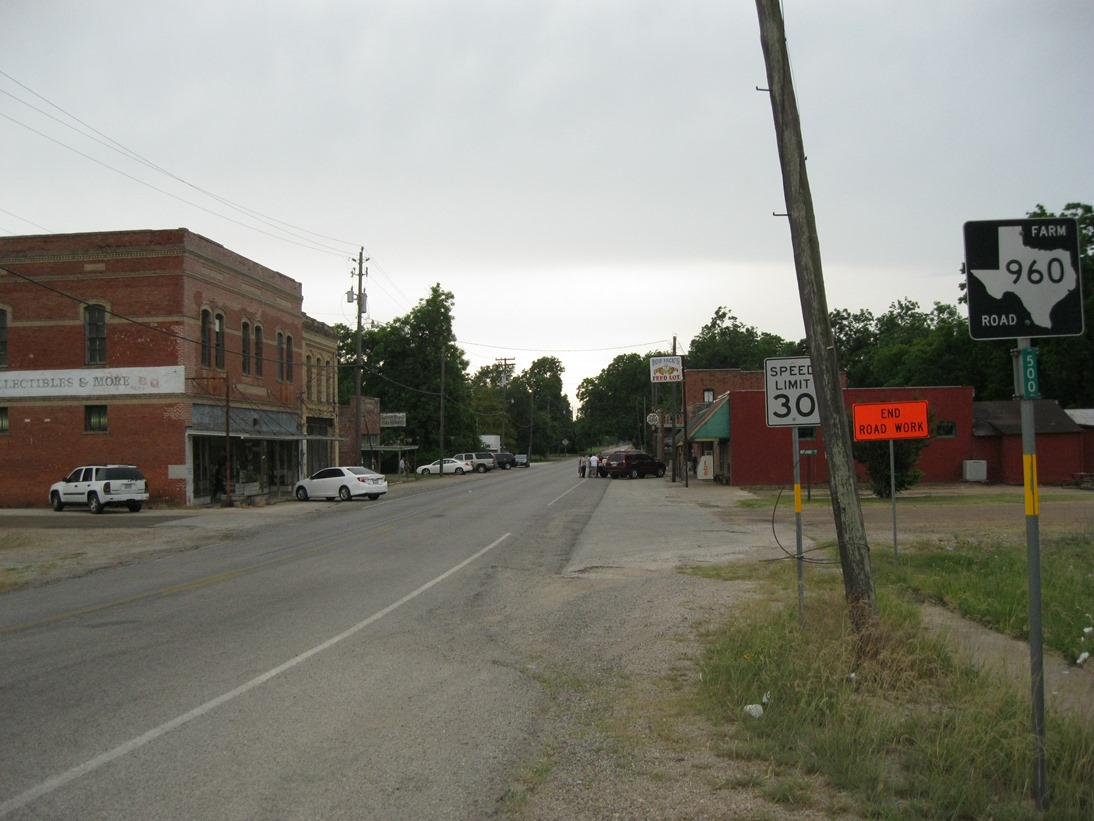
Old business district in Glen Flora on FM 960

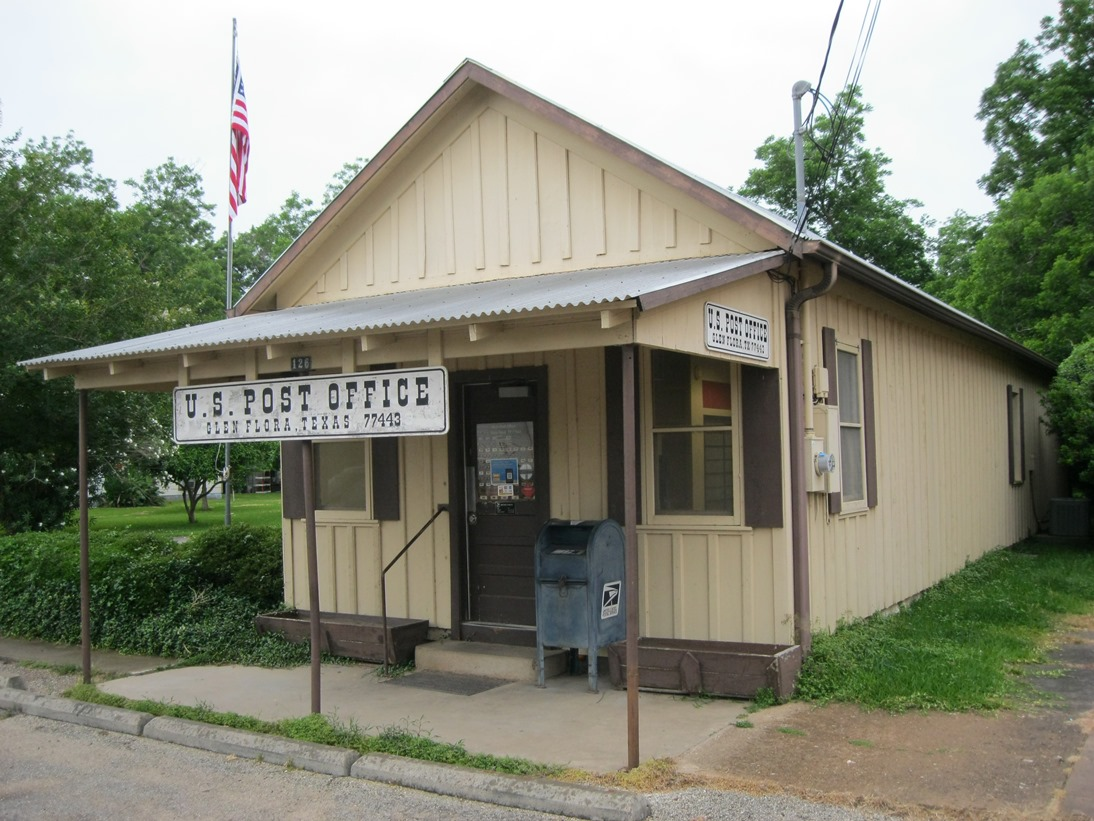
US Post Office on FM 960, also called Bridge Street

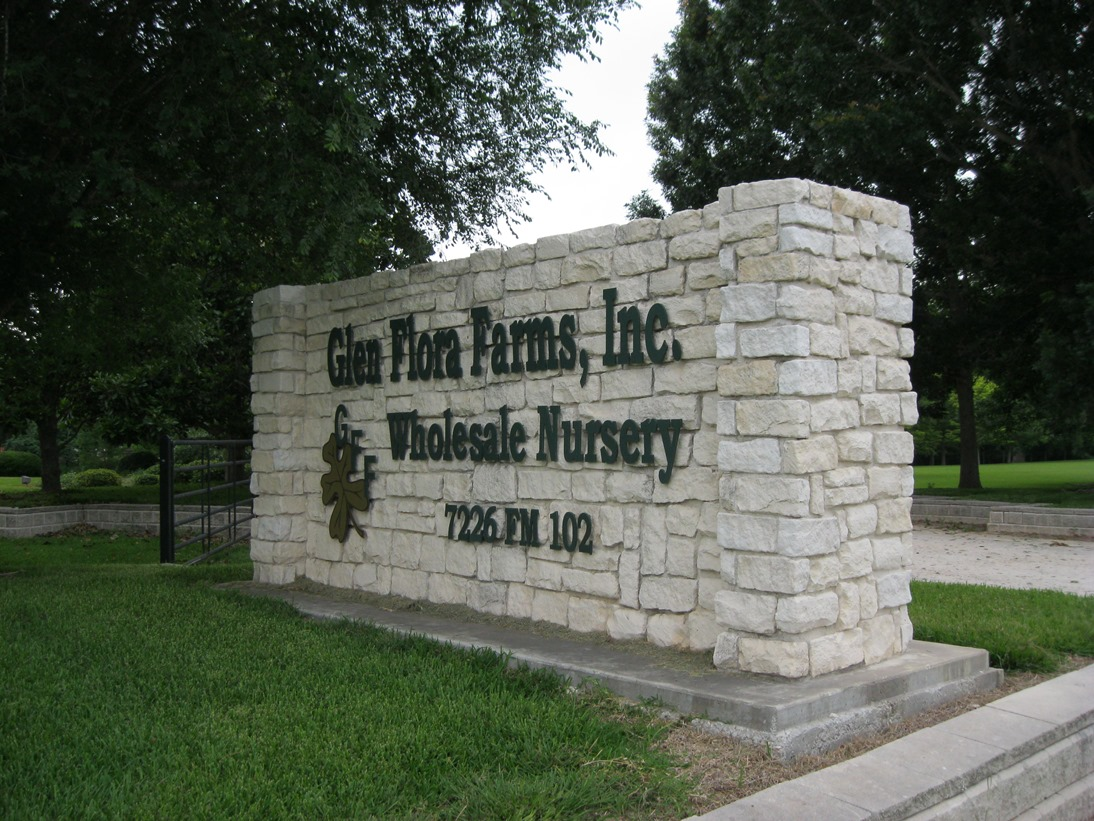
Glen Flora Farms, Inc. a wholesale nursery on FM 102
