= Cane Belt Railroad =

Railroad in Texas, United States

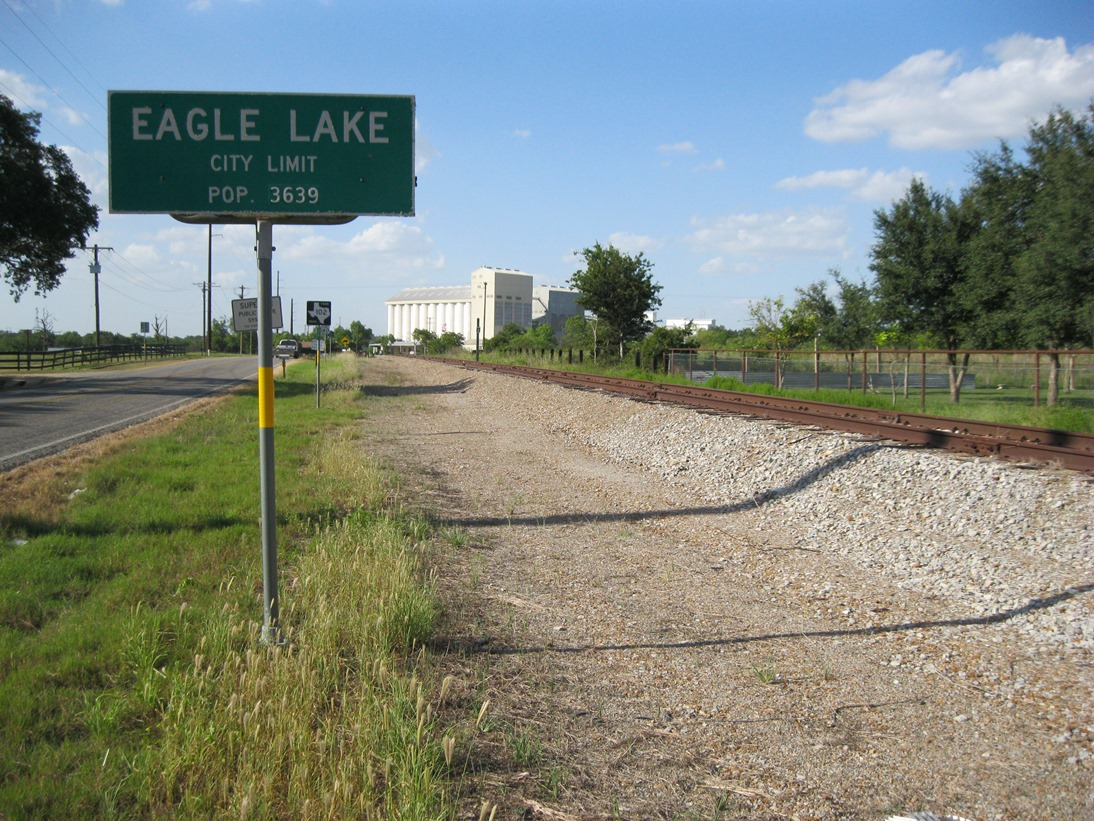
- In Eagle Lake, one-time Cane Belt right-of-way along FM 102 near the Lakeside Cemetery is still used as a Union Pacific siding.

Overview
- Locale: Texas
- Dates of operation: 1898–1948
- Successor: Gulf, Colorado and Santa Fe Railroad

Technical
- Track gauge: 4 ft 8 1/2 in (1,435 mm) standard gauge

The Cane Belt Railroad was chartered in the U.S. state of Texas in 1898. Formed by a group of businessmen from Eagle Lake, the short-line railroad was intended to bring the area's sugarcane to market. In 1902 a disagreement between two of the railroad's chief promoters proved deadly. By 1904 the line was in operation from Sealy to Matagorda on the Gulf of Mexico. That year the company's stock was bought by the Atchison, Topeka and Santa Fe Railway and the line continued operations under lease to the Gulf, Colorado and Santa Fe Railway starting in 1905. By the 1920s, the local sugarcane industry collapsed but the railroad was saved by the discovery of two nearby sulphur mines. In 1948, the Cane Belt was merged into the Gulf, Colorado and Santa Fe Railway. In the 1990s most of the original line was abandoned after the last sulphur mine closed. By 2013, only a small portion of the line south of Bay City was operating as part of the BNSF Railway.

== Founding ==
A circle of Eagle Lake businessmen and farmers applied for and received a charter for the Cane Belt Railroad on March 10, 1898. The area was a major producer of sugarcane and the railroad was desired to ship sugar and other local crops to market. The men who signed the charter were president Captain William Dunovant, vice president William T. Eldridge, secretary treasurer Thomas Boulden, directors Perry Clark, Osburn Green, E. P. Newsome and John W. Thatcher, and board members Rudolph Greenbaum, Frank P. Herbert and William Jasper McGee. Operating capital was $15,000 and headquarters were located in Eagle Lake. The original charter stipulated that the railroad would run 10 miles (16 km) from Lakeside to Bonus where Dunovant owned a large sugarcane plantation. In Eagle Lake there were connections with the San Antonio and Aransas Pass Railway and the Galveston, Harrisburg and San Antonio Railway.

The new railroad immediately bought 1 mile (1.6 km) of existing track from Lakeside north to Eagle Lake from the Galveston, Harrisburg and San Antonio Railway. The line was completed to Bonus on November 11, 1898. The original charter was amended on June 7, 1899, to extend the line northeast to Sealy where it would connect to the Missouri, Kansas and Texas Railway and the Gulf, Colorado and Santa Fe Railway. The amendment also called for an extension of the line from Bonus south to "tidewater on the Gulf of Mexico" at Matagorda. The company shareholders approved issuance of $1.2 million of bonds for 100 miles (161 km) of track. In 1900 the northeastern extension arrived at Sealy. Construction crews on the southern extension reached Wharton on June 30, 1899. A major servicing facility was established at Lane City in 1901. The town was named for Jonathan Lane, then president of the Cane Belt Railroad. Cattleman Abel Head "Shanghai" Pierce offered a $20,000 bonus if the line reached Bay City by July 1, 1901. By a sustained effort, the railroad builders reached Bay City with more than six hours to spare. Pierce died in 1900 but his estate paid the bonus. The line eventually stretched from Sealy to Matagorda and the full line was in service by June 30, 1904.

What became known as the Bonus Loop was built to connect with the 9,000 acre farm owned by Eldridge to the west. Meanwhile, Dunovant had 27,000 acres in cultivation south of Eagle Lake. Most of this land was devoted to rice farming which was pioneered in the area by Dunovant. But in 1901, Dunovant harvested 2,000 acres of sugarcane while Eldridge harvested 1,000 acres. The main railroad line ran along present-day Farm to Market Road 102 between Eagle Lake and Wharton. The Bonus Loop left the main line at Bonus, approximating the path of Farm to Market Road 2614. Then it ran north along Anderson and Calhoun Roads before turning east to reconnect with the main line just south of Lakeside.

== Violence and sale ==
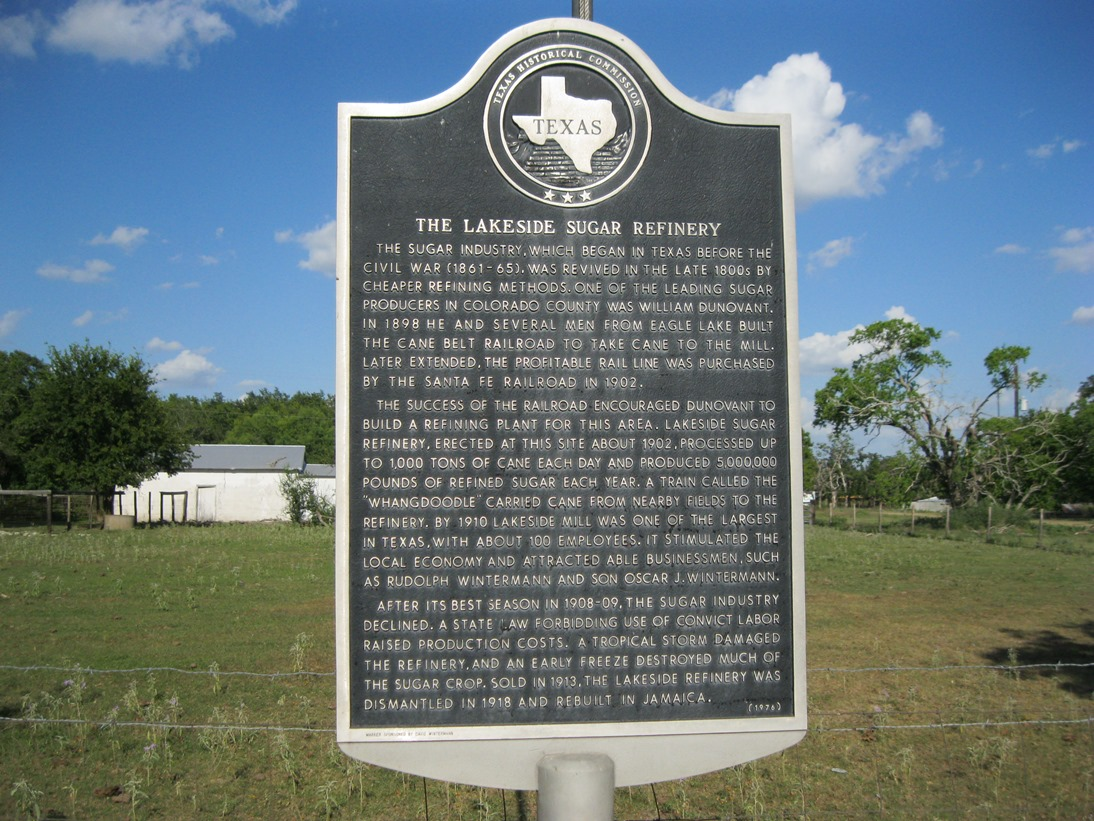
State marker relates the history of the Lakeside Sugar Refinery.

In 1901 Dunovant built a sugarcane refinery at the Cane Belt Railroad's Lakeside station. The strategically located facility was capable of producing 100 tons of sugar per day. At first the railroad was profitable, with $20,000 net profit in 1901. But the next year the company began to suffer from uneven cash flow and construction debt. A dispute over management of the railroad between Dunovant and Eldridge proved fatal. On August 11, 1902, Dunovant boarded the San Antonio and Aransas Pass Railway at Simonton. Eldridge, who was already aboard the train, immediately emptied his revolver into Dunovant and then smashed the gun down on his victim's skull. Dunovant, a Confederate veteran of the American Civil War who lost his left arm at the Battle of the Crater and who had previously threatened to kill Eldridge, did not survive the encounter. Before Eldridge could be brought to trial, Dunovant's partisans tried to exact revenge. On October 4, 1902, W.T. Cobb fired a shotgun blast at Eldridge but missed. Cobb was later acquitted.

On June 6, 1904, one of Dunovant's brothers-in-law, W. E. Calhoun fired a bullet through Eldridge's right lung from ambush but his intended target survived. Eldridge was tried for Dunovant's murder in November 1904 but found not guilty based on his plea of self-defense. A few weeks later Eldridge found that Calhoun was a passenger on the same train and gunned him down also. In January 1907 Eldridge was tried for Calhoun's murder at Bellville and acquitted again. Eldridge left the area and became partners with Isaac Herbert Kempner who founded the Imperial Sugar Company at Sugar Land. He died in Houston in 1932. Amid all this turmoil, the Cane Belt Railroad came close to bankruptcy. On November 11, 1903, the Atchison, Topeka and Santa Fe bought the railroad for $1.6 million, including $850,000 for stock and $750,000 for outstanding bonds. On April 11, 1905, the Texas Legislature passed a law allowing the Atchison, Topeka and Santa Fe to lease or sell the Cane Belt Railroad to its subsidiary, the Gulf, Colorado and Santa Fe. That railroad agreed to lease the Cane Belt on July 1, 1905.

== 1905 to 1948 ==
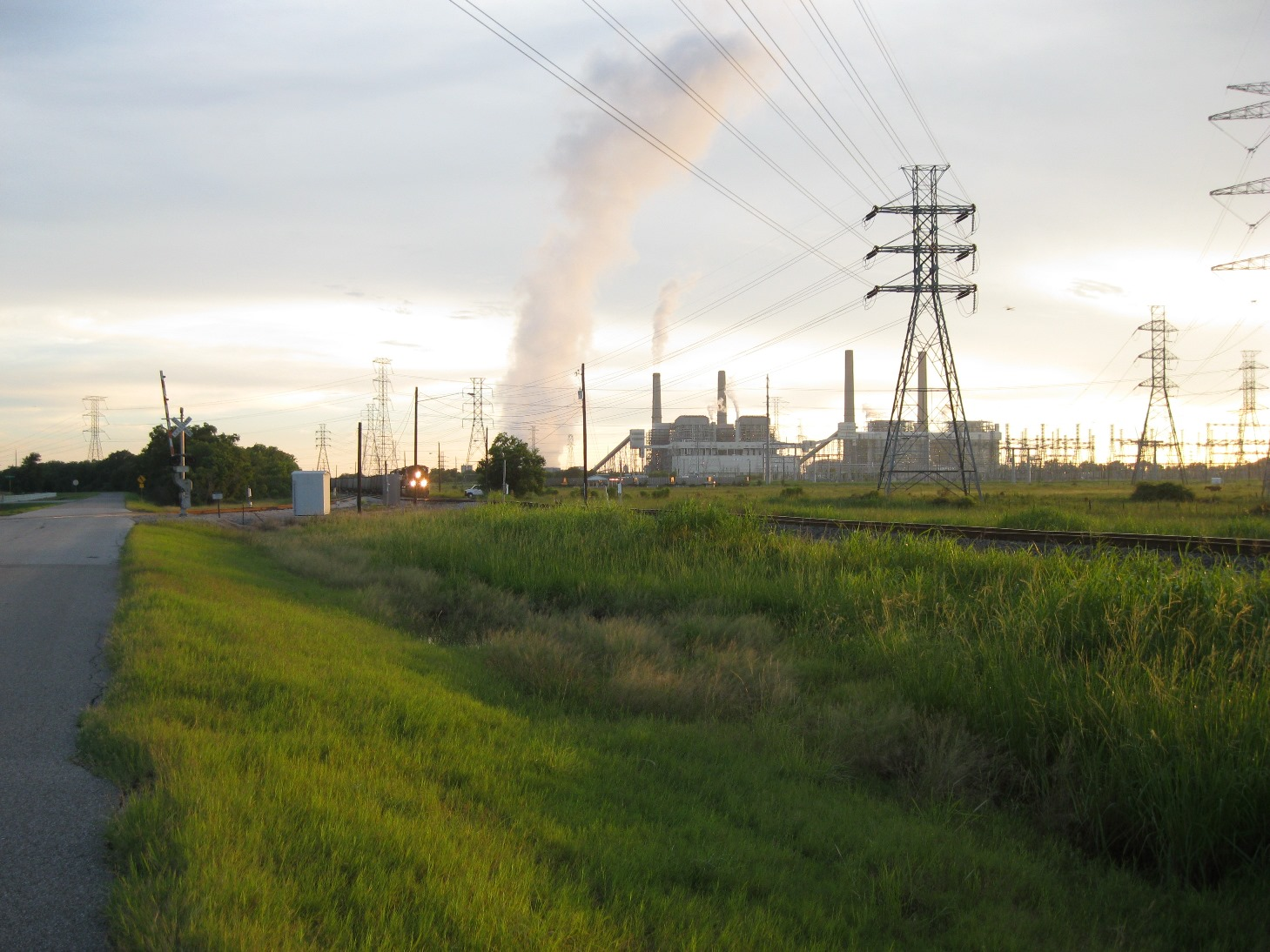
In Thompsons, part of the old Cane Belt right-of-way (right) is used to bring coal to the W A Parish power plant. The modern BNSF connecting line goes to the left across the road.

Several events caused the downfall of the local sugarcane business. Sugarcane required an enormous amount of manual labor to cut and load into wagons. Since the local population could not meet the demand for workers, the planters leased convicts from the Texas penitentiary system. In 1898 about 700 prisoners were harvesting sugarcane. Mutinies among the convict crews occurred because of the harsh conditions in the cane fields. Molasses imported from abroad and sugar beets grown in the United States proved to be cheaper to convert into sugar. In 1910 the Texas legislature passed a law forbidding the leasing of convicts on humanitarian grounds. In December 1911 there was a hard freeze which destroyed half of the sugarcane crop. The Lakeside sugarcane refinery closed in 1911 and in 1918 its machinery was sold to a producer in Jamaica. By the 1920s the local sugarcane crop dwindled to insignificance.

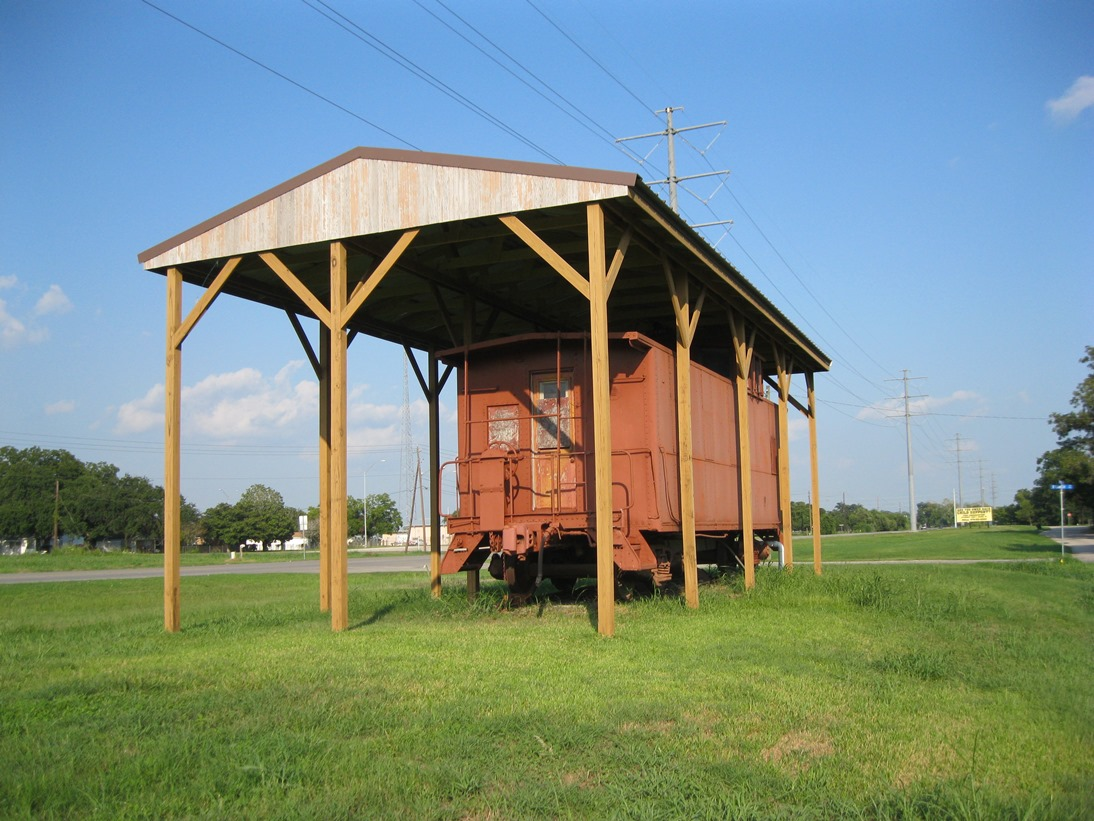
A caboose sits on the old Cane Belt right-of-way at FM 102 and Branch St in Wharton.

However, as sugarcane shipments fell off, rice shipments on the railroad increased substantially. But the economic salvation of the railroad proved to be the discovery of sulphur deposits at Gulf Hill near Matagorda in 1917. The Gulf Hill mine was opened in 1919 and sulphur shipments were soon a large part of the railroad's traffic. In 1926 the Texas Railroad Commission determined the value of the Cane Belt Railroad at $2.5 million though evidence hinted that the real value may have been nearly $3.5 million. In the 1920s, another sulphur mine was found near Boling. On February 1, 1928, the Cane Belt asked the Interstate Commerce Commission (ICC) for permission to build a new line from Lane City to Thompsons. Previously, the sulphur was shipped to Sealy before it could connect to a rail line to Galveston. Construction of the new branch would shorten the rail distance to Galveston by 65 miles (105 km). Rejecting a competing bid, the ICC granted the Cane Belt the right to build the line by June 30, 1931, and the new track was rapidly laid. The Gulf Hill mine played out in 1937 but by this time the Boling mine was shipping large quantities of sulphur.

By the 1930s the volume of agricultural traffic on the Cane Belt had steeply declined. In 1939, the railroad applied to the ICC to shut down the Bonus Loop from Bonus to Eldridge, the site of Eldridge's one-time plantation. The application was granted and service stopped on September 16, 1940. The Eldridge post office closed two years later. By this time shipments of rice, livestock, oyster shell for road surfacing and other freight began to fall. Sulphur was the backbone of the railroad. In 1945, in addition to 3,824 bales of cotton, the Cane Belt shipped 17,789 carloads of sulphur, 1,613 of oyster shell, 1,122 of petroleum products, 354 of rice and 82 of fruits and vegetables. The only fatal wreck during World War II claimed the lives of two brakemen when a train ran through an open switch. In those days brakemen earned $0.82 per hour.

In the years after the war a train crew's workday usually started at Sealy at 6:45 am and ended at Matagorda at 10:45 pm. The crews stayed overnight in bunk cars at Matagorda and began the return journey the next day. Each train typically carried an engineer, fireman, conductor and two brakemen. During harvest season a third brakeman was added to the crews. Cane Belt service was unpopular and the more senior workers of the Gulf, Colorado and Santa Fe usually opted to work on the Galveston main line. Passenger service was included on the Cane Belt by attaching a car to the end of the trains. In December 1948, the Cane Belt was absorbed by the Gulf, Colorado and Santa Fe Railway and the railroad ceased to exist.

== Post merger ==
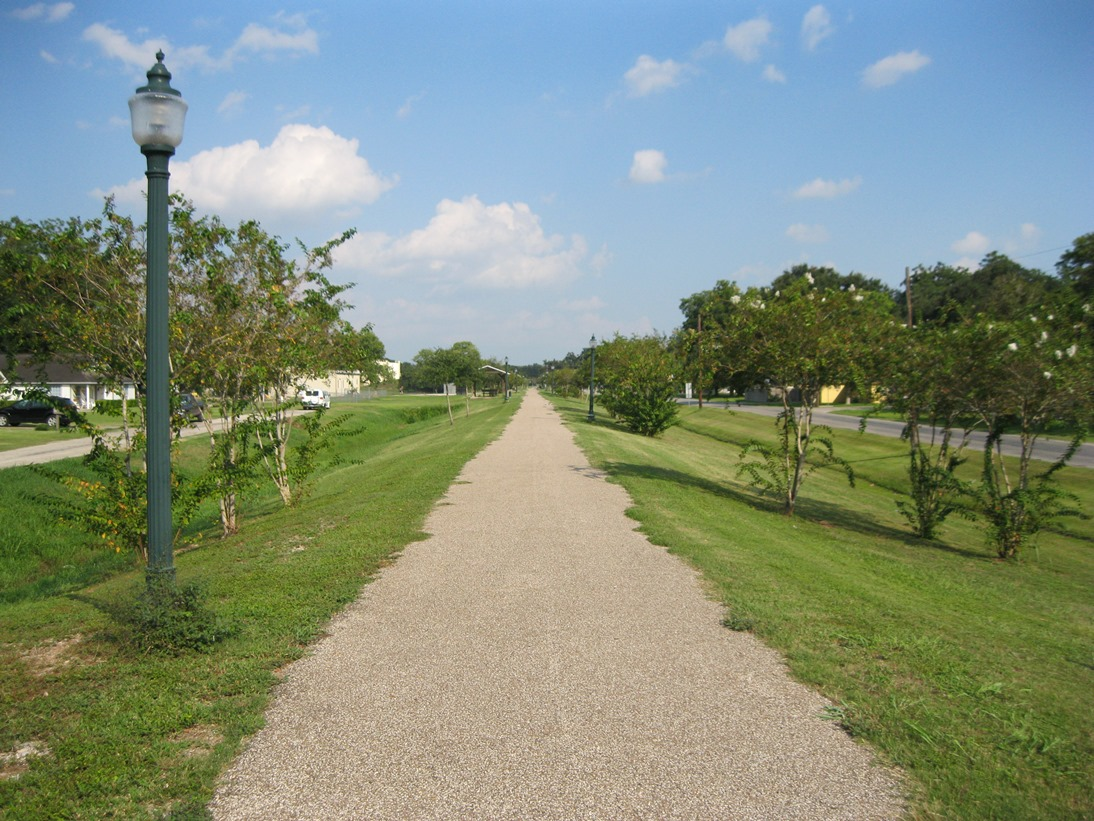
The Santa Fe Trail follows the old Cane Belt Railroad right-of-way in Wharton.

As the local highways improved, more freight was carried by trucks, cutting into railroad traffic. Passenger service between Sealy and Matagorda on the former Cane Belt line was ended on March 12, 1956. The Railroad Commission permitted the abandonment of the Matagorda station in 1967 and the tracks were removed. Demand for sulphur decreased beginning in the 1950s. The great sulphur mine at Newgulf near Boling stopped production in 1993. In the 1990s almost the entire line was abandoned and the track removed.

In 1995 Southeastern International Corporation (SEI) acquired the line from Bay City to Wharton. Up to that time, outbound rail traffic consisted of grain shipments while inbound traffic was mostly chicken feed and chemicals. On April 14, 1999, SEI petitioned the Surface Transportation Board to remove 11.76 miles (18.93 km) of track from milepost 42.24 in Wharton to milepost 54.00 near Lane City. SEI complained that rail traffic dropped significantly in 1997 and that BNSF rates increased in 1998, forcing the company to incur a $117,081 loss. On August 2, 1999, the petition was approved, subject to environmental limitations.

On October 4, 2004, the BNSF Railway applied to the Surface Transportation Board to abandon 20.89 miles (33.62 km) of the line from milepost 66.95 at Bay City to milepost 54.00 at Cane Junction and from milepost 0.00 at Cane Junction to milepost 7.94 at Newgulf. BNSF argued that there had been no rail traffic for two years. The assessment noted that there were four ballast deck frame trestle bridges on the Newgulf extension, all built in 1930. In addition, there were four open pile trestle bridges between Cane Junction and Bay City, all built between 1912 and 1922.

By 1998, the only part of the old Cane Belt system that still served rail shippers was south of Bay City. In that year, the Celanese Chemical and Lyondell Petrochemical companies shipped approximately 10,000 railcars through Bay City from their facilities. In 2013, other short fragments of the original line existed as sidings at Eagle Lake and Thompsons. A portion of the Cane Belt right-of-way that ran through Wharton has been converted into the 1.62 miles (2.61 km) Santa Fe Trail.
