= Bonus, Texas =

- Unincorporated community
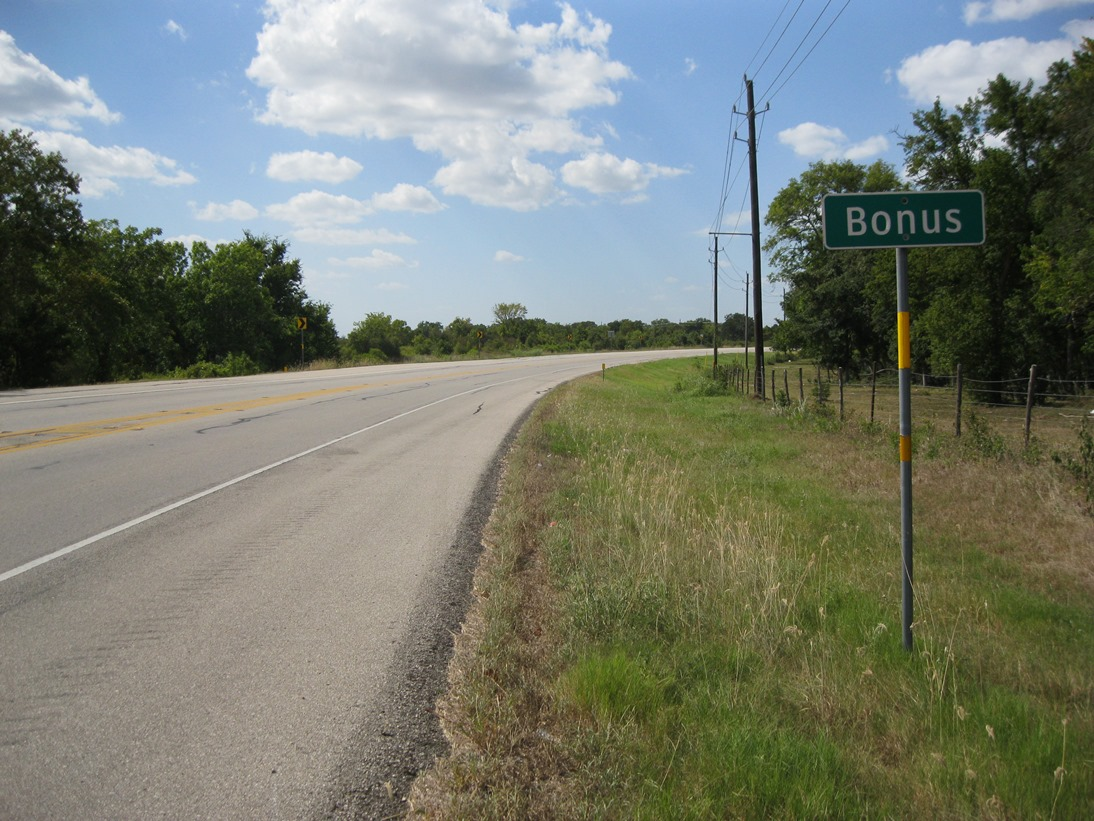
- Bonus sign is on FM 102

- Location within the state of Texas Bonus, Texas (the United States)
- Coordinates: 29°27′06″N 96°16′51″W
- Country: United States
- State: Texas
- County: Wharton
- Elevation: 148 ft (45 m)
- Time zone: UTC-6 (Central (CST))
  - Summer (DST): UTC-5 (CDT)
- ZIP code: 77434
- Area code: 979
- GNIS feature ID: 1378031

Bonus is an unincorporated community in northern Wharton County, Texas, United States located about 15 miles (24 km) north of Wharton near the intersection of Farm to Market Road 102 and Farm to Market Road 2614.

== History ==
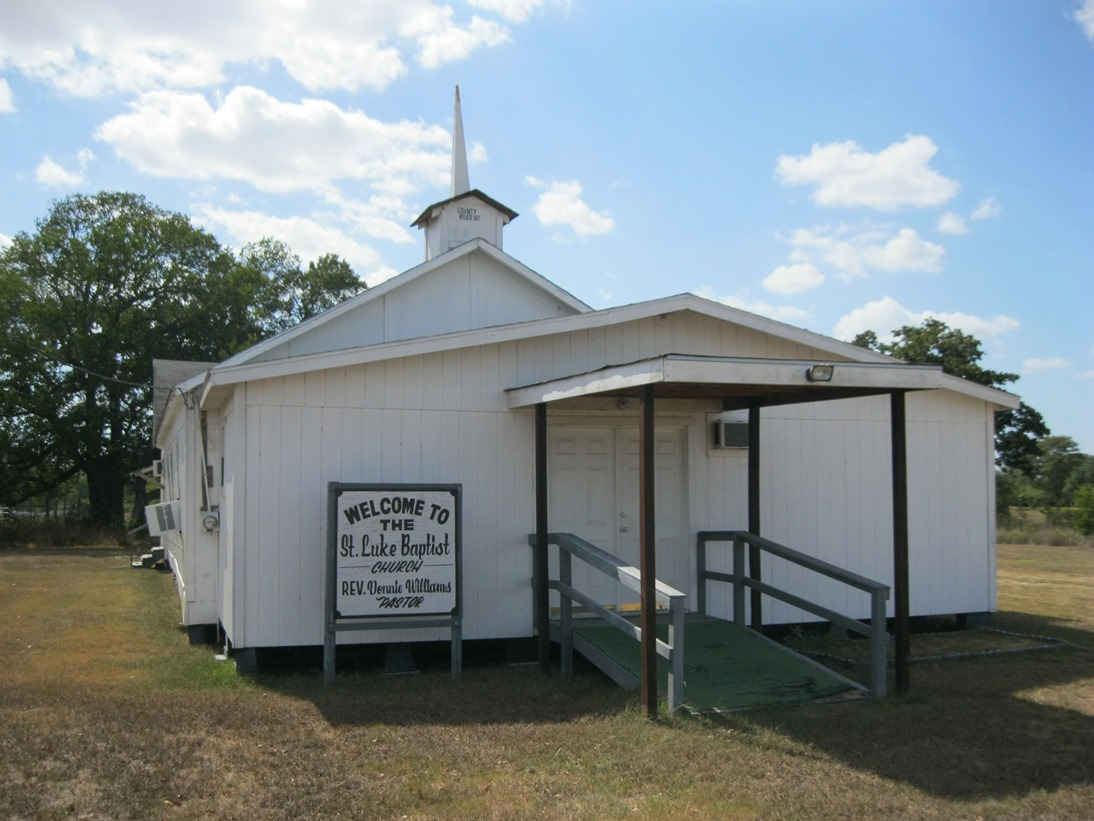
St. Luke Baptist Church

Bonus began in the mid-1890s. The construction of the Cane Belt Railroad ended at the Wharton County plantation site owned by W. L. Dunovant and William Thomas Eldridge, who were among the people who chartered the railroad. In 1896, the community applied for a post office and requested the name "Alamo." That name was not approved. The Handbook of Texas states that Bonus became the name "reportedly" since the owners of the railroad were promised a bonus if they built into the area. The Bonus post office opened in 1896. Dunovant and Eldridge brought African American families to grow cotton, corn, rice, and sugar cane. In its early history, Bonus had relatively few White American residents. The Dunovant-Eldridge partnership included land in various communities, including Bonus. In the early 1900s, a prison camp opened in Bonus, and prisoners worked the land and performed agricultural jobs while under contract. In 1901, the partnership ended and Eldridge took the Bonus plantation while Dunovant took another plantation. In 1902, Eldridge shot Dunovant to death.

In 1936, Bonus had fifty residents and two businesses. Throughout its history, the community received a low volume of mail. The post office was discontinued three times before the final closing in 1940; thereafter, residents received mail in Eagle Lake and Egypt. In 1940, the Eldridge to Bonus rail link ended. The rail bed became a county road. In the 1980s, the community had 42 residents and no reported businesses. In 1992, the Cane Belt service ended. This led to the removal of the gravel bed, ties, and tracks. In 2000, Bonus had 42 residents.

== Education ==
East Bernard Independent School District (EBISD) serves Bonus.

In 1905, a segregated school for African-Americans had one teacher and 57 students. The Bonus School merged with the Nedra School, a small segregated school for Blacks east of Bonus, to form the Bonus-Nedra School. In 1926, the school district had four schools with a combined total of four teachers, 75 White American students, and 110 Black students. In 1958, the district combined with the Hungerford Independent School District. In 1973, EBISD took the land.

== Notable person ==
- Joseph Newman, part of Stephen F. Austin's Old Three Hundred, ranched and farmed a sitio near Bonus.
