= Elm Grove, Wharton County, Texas =

Elm Grove, Texas
- Unincorporated community
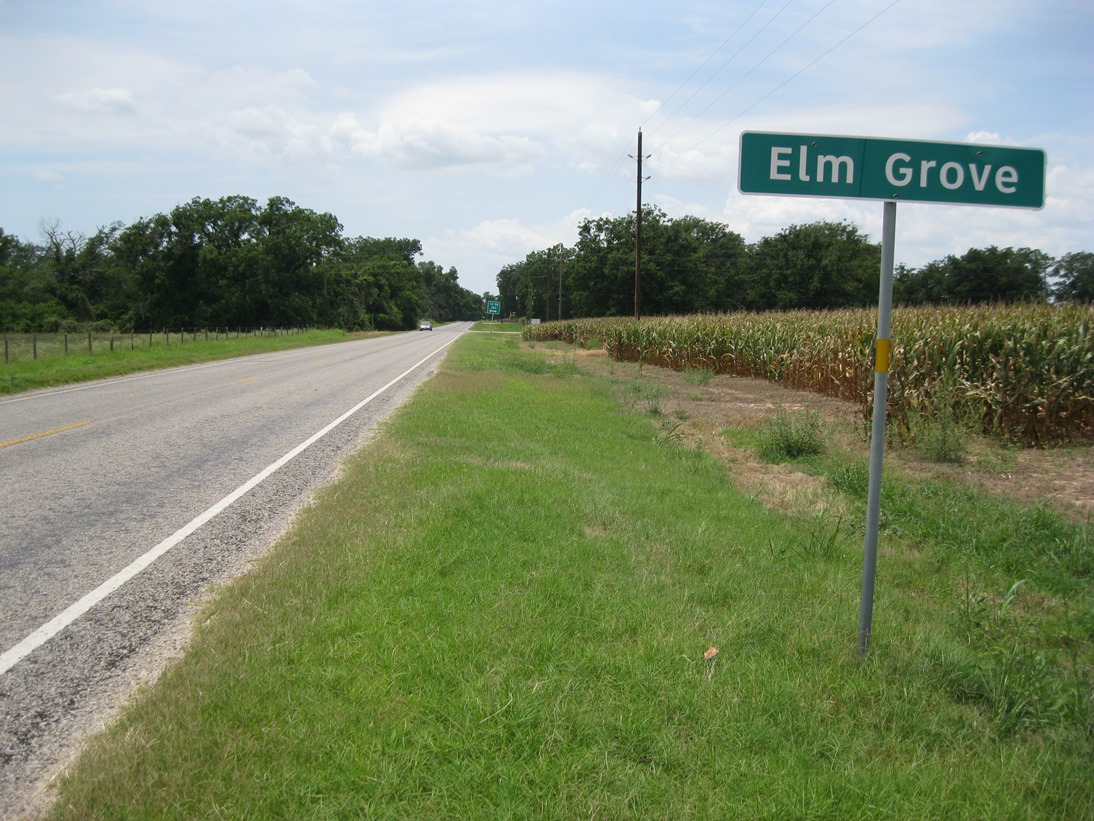
- Elm Grove sign

- Location within the state of Texas Elm Grove, Texas (the United States)
- Coordinates: 29°26′32″N 96°19′33″W
- Country: United States
- State: Texas
- County: Wharton
- Elevation: 138 ft (42 m)
- Time zone: UTC-6 (Central (CST))
  - Summer (DST): UTC-5 (CDT)
- ZIP code: 77434
- Area code: 979
- GNIS feature ID: 1378254

Elm Grove is an unincorporated community at the northern edge of Wharton County, in the U.S. state of Texas. The very small community is situated on Farm to Market Road 2614, (FM 2614) to the south of Eagle Lake, which is in Colorado County.

== History ==
Elm Grove is located approximately 16 miles (25.7 km) northwest of Wharton. A 1936 county roadmap noted that there were several homes in the area. By the 1980s there were still two commercial establishments, a few houses, a cemetery, and a church.

== Geography ==
Elm Grove is on FM 2614, a distance of 3.3 miles (5.3 km) to the west of Farm to Market Road 102 (FM 102) at Bonus. The Elm Grove Cemetery is 1.2 miles (1.9 km) north-northeast of FM 2614 at County Road 267. The addresses in the area all bear the same zip code as Eagle Lake, 77434. FM 2614 crosses the Colorado County line a short distance to the west. Garwood in Colorado County is to the west of Elm Grove, as is the Colorado River.

== Education ==
In 1912, there was a school for African-American children in the community, which was still in existence in 1936. Today, the community is served by the East Bernard Independent School District.

== Gallery ==
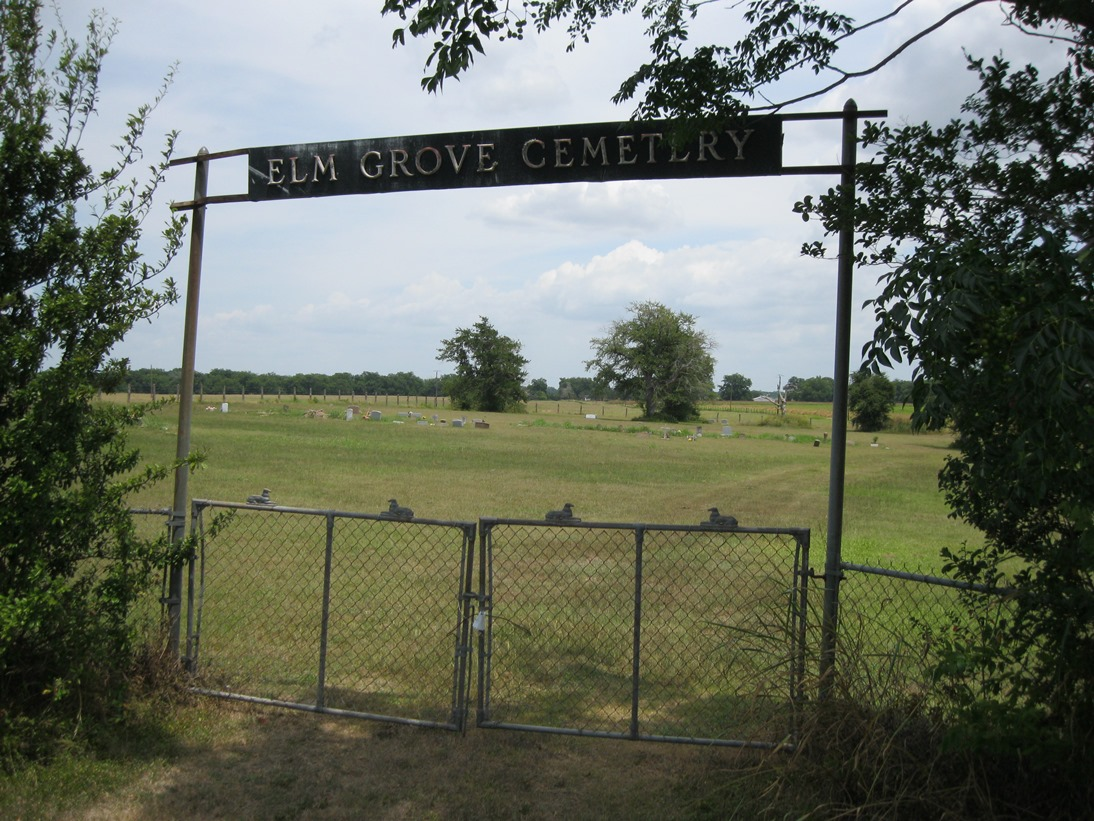
Elm Grove Cemetery

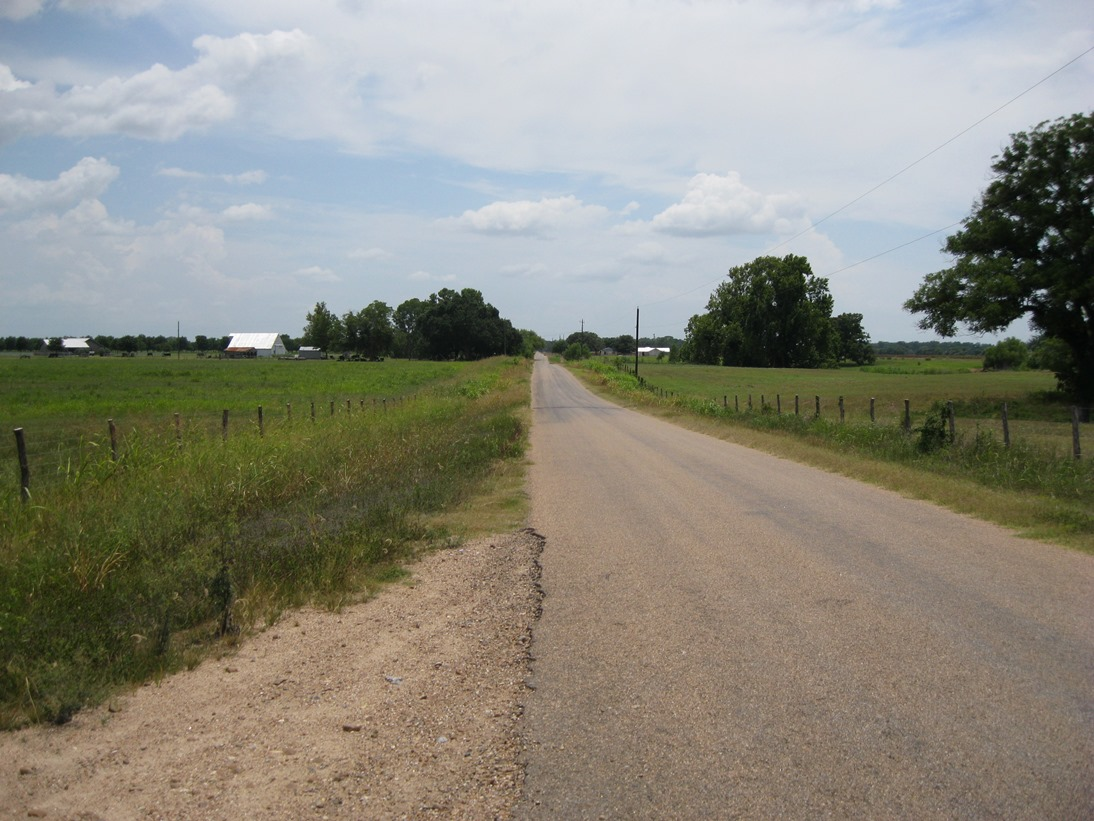
County Road 267 southwest from Elm Grove Cemetery
