= Howie Fitzgerald =

American baseball player (1902–1959)

- Outfielder
- Born: May 16, 1902; Eagle Lake, Texas, U.S.
- Died: February 26, 1959 (aged 56); Matthews, Texas, U.S.
- Batted: Left Threw: Left

MLB debut
- September 17, 1922, for the Chicago Cubs

Last MLB appearance
- August 6, 1926, for the Boston Red Sox

MLB statistics
- Batting average: .257
- Home runs: 0
- Runs batted in: 14
- Stats at Baseball Reference

Teams
- Chicago Cubs (1922, 1924); Boston Red Sox (1926)

Howard Chumney Fitzgerald (May 16, 1902 – February 26, 1959) was an American professional baseball outfielder. Born in Eagle Lake, Texas, he batted and threw left-handed.

== Biography ==
Fitzgerald's professional baseball career spanned 1922–1933, most of it in the minor leagues. He played in the major-leagues for two teams: the Chicago Cubs in 1922 and 1924 and the Boston Red Sox in 1926.

In a three-season major-league career, Fitzgerald posted a .257 batting average (36-for-140) with 14 runs batted in (RBIs) in 48 games. He did not hit a home run. Defensively, he appeared primarily as a left fielder, making 21 of his 34 starts there.

Fitzgerald died in 1959 in an automobile accident in Matthews, Texas, (Note: Matthews appears as "Mathews" in some sources.) at age 56.

In 2005, Fitzgerald was selected to the Texas League Hall of Fame. He played nine seasons in the Texas League, primarily with the Wichita Falls Spudders.
