= Farm to Market Road 949 =

Road in Texas, United States

Farm to Market Road 949

Route information
- Maintained by TxDOT
- Length: 26.133 mi (42.057 km)
- Existed: November 23, 1948–present

Major junctions
- South end: FM 102
- I-10 / US 90
- North end: SH 36 near Peters

Location
- Country: United States
- State: Texas
- Counties: Austin, Colorado

Highway system
- Highways in Texas; Interstate; US; State; Former; Toll; Loops; Spurs; FM/RM; Park; Rec
| ← FM 948 | → FM 950 |

Farm to Market Road 949 (FM 949) is a state highway in the U.S. state of Texas. The two-lane highway starts at FM 102 northwest of Eagle Lake in Colorado County, heads in a northerly direction across Interstate 10, swings northeast through the small communities of Bernardo and Cat Spring and ends at State Highway 36 (SH 36) near Peters in Austin County.

== Route description ==
FM 949 begins near the one-time community of Ramsey, which was located on FM 102 between Eagle Lake and Alleyton. From its starting point, FM 949 heads northeast 1.8 miles (2.9 km) to an intersection with FM 2761. From there, the highway turns sharply to the northwest and goes 3.8 miles (6.1 km) before coming to a bridge over I-10. The interstate highway can be accessed in both directions via entrance and exit ramps. After continuing in a northwesterly direction for less than one mile to Frelsburg Road, FM 949 turns sharply to the northeast again. The highway goes 10.5 miles (16.9 km) northeast through Bernardo, across the San Bernard River into Austin County and comes to the junction with FM 2187 in Cat Spring. FM 949 continues northeast for 1.6 miles (2.6 km) from Cat Spring to FM 1094. From this intersection, the highway turns to a slightly more easterly course for 3.5 miles (5.6 km) before coming to the junction with FM 2429. FM 949 goes another 4.9 miles (7.9 km) in a southeasterly direction before terminating at SH 36 a short distance north of Peters.

== History ==
FM 949 was originally designated on November 23, 1948 to begin at US 90 a distance of 7.5 miles (12.1 km) east of Columbus and go about 3.7 miles (6.0 km) to Bernardo. On July 18, 1955, the highway was authorized to start from FM 102 at Ramsey and continue northeast and northwest to Bernardo, a distance of approximately 9.5 miles (15.3 km). On November 3, 1972, FM 949 was extended northeast about 5.5 miles (8.9 km) to the end of FM 1088. On December 7, 1972, the highway was extended over the former FM 1088 right-of-way, ending at SH 36 near Peters. This extension added 11.8 miles (19.0 km).

== Major intersections ==
| County | Location | mi | km | Destinations | Notes |
|---|---|---|---|---|---|
| Colorado | Ramsey | 0.0 | 0.0 | FM 102 | Southern terminus of FM 949 |
| Colorado | | 1.8 | 2.9 | FM 2761 | Southern terminus of FM 2761 |
| Colorado | | 5.6 | 9.0 | I-10 / US 90 | Interchange; I-10 exit 704 |
| Austin | Cat Spring | 16.1 | 25.9 | FM 2187 | Western terminus of FM 2187 |
| Austin | | 17.7 | 28.5 | FM 1094 | |
| Austin | | 21.2 | 34.1 | FM 2429 | Southern terminus of FM 2429 |
| Austin | Peters | 26.1 | 42.0 | SH 36 | Northern terminus of FM 949 |
1.000 mi = 1.609 km; 1.000 km = 0.621 mi
