= Continental Express Flight 2574 =

1991 aviation accident in Texas

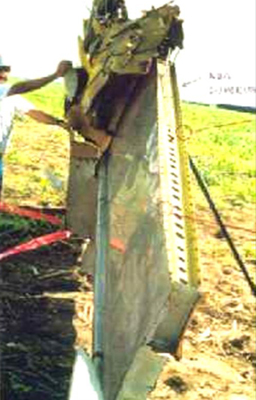
- Wreckage of the aircraft's horizontal stabilizer

Accident
- Date: September 11, 1991
- Summary: In-flight structural failure due to maintenance error leading to in-flight breakup.
- Site: Colorado County, near Eagle Lake, Texas, United States; 29°31′38″N 96°23′21″W

Aircraft
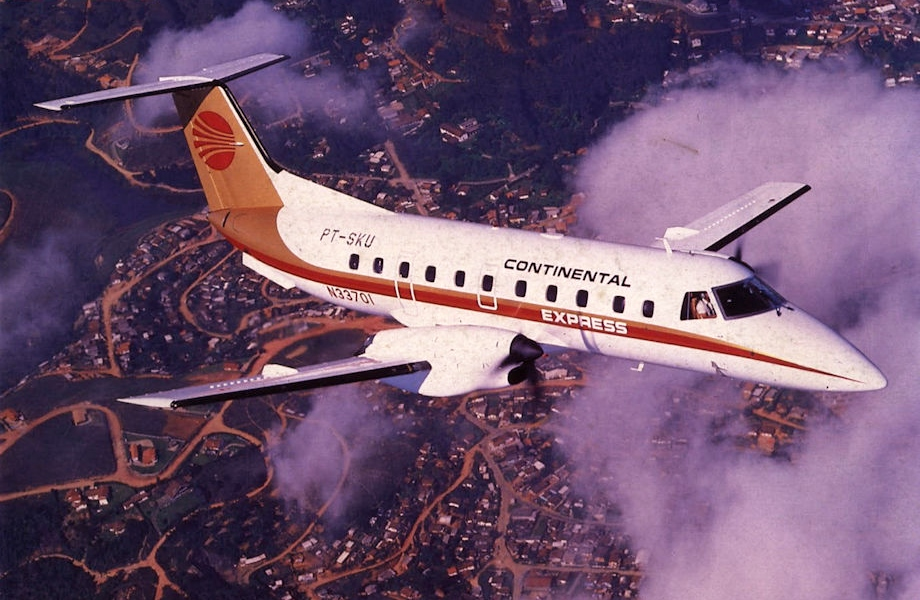
- N33701, the aircraft involved in the accident, pictured in 1989 with a test registration
- Aircraft type: Embraer EMB 120RT Brasilia
- Operator: Britt Airways on behalf of Continental Express
- IATA flight No.: RU2574
- ICAO flight No.: BTA2574
- Call sign: JETLINK 2574
- Registration: N33701
- Flight origin: Laredo International Airport, Laredo, Texas, United States
- Destination: Houston Intercontinental Airport, Houston, Texas, United States
- Occupants: 14
- Passengers: 11
- Crew: 3
- Fatalities: 14
- Survivors: 0

Continental Express Flight 2574 was a scheduled domestic passenger airline flight operated by Britt Airways from Laredo International Airport in Laredo, Texas to Houston Intercontinental Airport (IAH) (now called George Bush Intercontinental Airport) in Houston, Texas. On September 11, 1991, the Embraer EMB 120 Brasilia turboprop, registered N33701, crashed while initiating its landing sequence, killing all 14 people on board. The aircraft wreckage hit an area near Eagle Lake, Texas, approximately 65 miles (105 km) west-southwest of the airport.

The media stated that there was initial speculation that a bomb had destroyed the aircraft; the National Transportation Safety Board (NTSB) subsequently discovered that missing screws on the horizontal stabilizer led to the breakup.

== Background ==
=== Aircraft ===
The aircraft involved was an Embraer 120RT Brasilia, registered as N33701 with serial number 120077. It was delivered to Continental Express in 1988, three years before the accident, and had accumulated 7,229 flight hours through 10,009 cycles. The Federal Aviation Administration records stated that the aircraft had been sent to the maintenance hangar 33 times for unscheduled repairs.

=== Crew ===
The crew consisted of 29-year-old Captain Brad Patridge of Kingwood, Texas (Greater Houston), 43-year-old First Officer Clint Rodosovich of Houston and 33-year-old Flight Attendant Nancy Reed of Humble, Texas. Patridge and Rodosovich were experienced pilots with 4,243 flight hours and 11,543 flight hours (including 2,468 hours and 1,066 hours on the EMB 120 Brasilia), respectively. The whole crew was based in Houston.

== Accident ==
The left side leading edge that separated from the airframe; found on the day of the accident

The EMB 120 departed Laredo International Airport at 09:09 local time, operating under Federal Aviation Regulation Part 135. After a normal takeoff, the flight was assigned a cruise altitude of flight level 250 (25,000 feet (7,600 m)), then reassigned to FL240 (24,000 feet (7,300 m)). At 09:54, the flight crew responded to the Houston Air Route Traffic Control Center and started descending to 9,000 feet (2,700 m). At approximately 10:03 while descending through 11,500 feet (3,500 m) with an indicated airspeed of 260 knots (300 mph; 480 km/h), the leading edge of the left horizontal stabilizer separated from the airframe, and the airplane pitched down dramatically, rolling around on an axis as the left wing broke and folded. The escaping fuel from the wings ignited, and the pilots and others onboard lost consciousness from the severe g-forces, which reached at least 3.375 times the force of gravity, caused by the severe oscillations of the crippled aircraft.

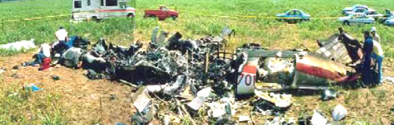
Full wreckage of the aircraft

The wreckage fell in southeast Colorado County, Texas, exploding on impact, off Farm to Market Road 102, seven miles (11 km) southeast of Eagle Lake, Texas, and 60 miles (97 km) west of Downtown Houston. The Texas Department of Public Safety announced that rescue units had discovered no survivors. The wreckage was spread over a 2- to 4-square-mile (10 km^{2}) area, and some pieces fell into the Colorado River. Diamonds worth approximately $500,000 (1991 value; $1,200,000 in 2025) were discovered in the wreckage, but they had no role in the crash.

== Investigation ==
The National Transportation Safety Board (NTSB) investigation revealed that screws had been removed from the horizontal stabilizer during maintenance the night before the accident and, following a shift change, the screws had not been replaced. The aircraft's first flight of the day was uneventful because it did not reach the accident flight's top speed of 260 knots (480 km/h; 300 mph).

The NTSB cited the failure of airline maintenance and inspection personnel to adhere to proper maintenance and quality-assurance procedures. The failure of Federal Aviation Administration (FAA) surveillance to detect and verify compliance with approved procedures was cited as a contributing factor. Following the accident, the FAA conducted a National Aviation Safety Inspection Program (NASIP) of Continental Express' maintenance program. It found very few safety deficiencies and complimented the airline on its internal evaluation system. The NTSB expressed concern that the NASIP did not find deficiencies in shift-turnover procedures and other matters relevant to the accident and recommended that the agency improve its NASIP procedures.

== Probable cause ==
The NTSB determined the probable causes of the accident as follows:

The failure of Continental Express maintenance and inspection personnel to adhere to proper maintenance and quality assurance procedures for the airplane's horizontal stabilizer de-ice boots that led to the sudden in-flight loss of the partially secured left horizontal stabilizer leading edge and the immediate severe nose-down pitchover and breakup of the airplane. Contributing to the cause of the accident was the failure of the Continental Express management to ensure compliance with the approved maintenance procedures, and the failure of FAA surveillance to detect and verify compliance with approved procedures.

== Notable victims ==
- María Guillermina Valdes Villalva, Chicana scholar and activist.

== Role in developing the culture of safety ==
NTSB member Dr. John Lauber suggested that the probable cause of the accident included "The failure of Continental Express management to establish a corporate culture which encouraged and enforced adherence to approved maintenance and quality assurance procedures." As a result of this and other similar aviation accidents, safety culture became the main topic at the U.S. National Summit on Transportation Safety, hosted by the NTSB in 1997.

This movement for air safety continued with the April 5, 2000 enactment of the Wendell H. Ford Aviation Investment and Reform Act for the 21st Century, also called AIR 21.

== Dramatization ==
The Discovery Channel Canada / National Geographic TV series Mayday featured the accident in a Season 11 episode titled "Breakup Over Texas."

Smithsonian Channel also featured this episode in its series Air Disasters (2013, Season 3, Episode 6.)

== See also ==
- List of accidents and incidents involving commercial aircraft

=== Similar accidents ===
- Alaska Airlines Flight 261, a flight that suffered a catastrophic loss of control after improper repairs to jackscrew few years prior.
- China Airlines Flight 611, a flight that suffered a catastrophic mid-air breakup after improper repairs from a tail strike 22 years prior.
- Japan Air Lines Flight 123, a flight accident caused by a faulty tailstrike repair 7 years prior.
- Chalk's Ocean Airways Flight 101, a case where a wing separated from a flight after improper corrosion repairs to the aircraft.
- Partnair Flight 394, a flight that disintegrated in midair due to improper maintenance and use of counterfeit aircraft parts.
- September 11 attacks, a series of aircraft hijackings which happened exactly 10 years later.
