= Peters, Texas =

- Unincorporated community
- Location within the state of Texas Peters, Texas (the United States)
- Coordinates: 29°51′36″N 96°11′12″W
- Country: United States
- State: Texas
- County: Austin
- Elevation: 169 ft (52 m)
- Time zone: UTC-6 (Central (CST))
  - Summer (DST): UTC-5 (CDT)
- ZIP code: 77474
- Area code: 979

Peters is an unincorporated community in Austin County in the U.S. state of Texas. According to the Handbook of Texas, the community had a population of 95 in 2000. It is located within the Greater Houston metropolitan area.

== Geography ==
The community of Peters is 5.8 miles (9.3 km) north of Sealy and 7.7 miles (12.4 km) south of Bellville on SH 36 at Peters San Felipe Road. The location is bracketed by Farm to Market Road 949 which is 1.0 mile (1.6 km) north on SH 36 and Farm to Market Road 331 which is 1.6 miles (2.6 km) south. The BNSF Railway runs parallel with SH 36 between Sealy and Bellville. On the west side of SH 36, Peters San Felipe Road goes south-southwest 0.5 miles (0.8 km) to end at Trenckmann Road. On the east side of SH 36, Peters San Felipe Road heads 6.3 miles (10.1 km) southeast to San Felipe. Two places of worship, the All Around Cowboy Church and the Christian City Fellowship are on the east side of SH 36 just to the south of Trenckmann Road. Camp Brosig, owned by the Boy Scouts of America, is located nearby at 1893 Trenckmann Road 1.6 miles (2.6 km) to the northwest of SH 36.

== History ==
Austin County was first settled by Anglo-Americans in the 1820s, but Peters did not come into existence until the Gulf, Colorado and Santa Fe Railway was built between Sealy and Bellville in the 1880s. A station on the railroad, the community received a post office in 1883 and was named for Albert Peters, an early settler. The population reached as high as 125 in 1925 but declined to 70 by 1943. The post office closed in the 1940s at a time when there were two local businesses. In 1968 there were about 100 in the area. In the early 1980s, the community boasted a hospital, three commercial establishments, a church, and a clubhouse. From 1990 to 2000, approximately 95 persons were living in the area. There are currently only a few homes, a Boy Scout camp and two churches in the immediate area.

== Education ==
The community of Peters is served by the Sealy Independent School District.

== Gallery ==
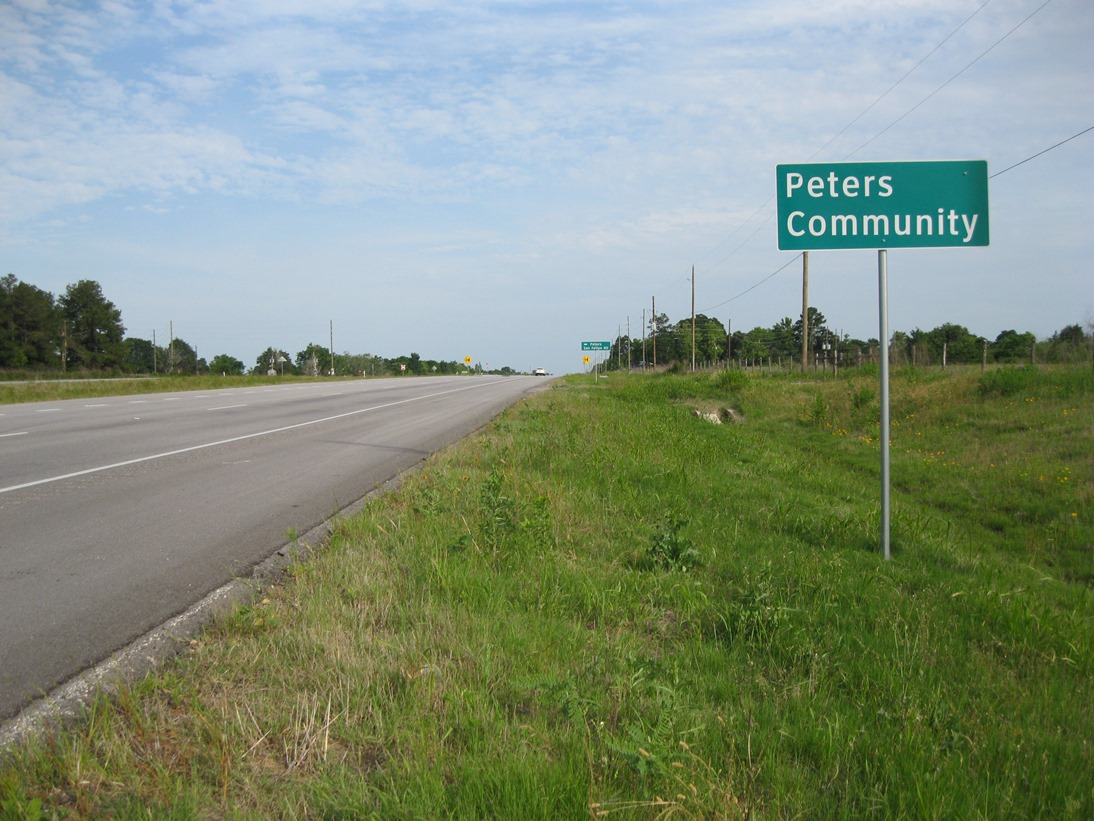
Peters Community sign is on State Highway 36, looking to the southeast.

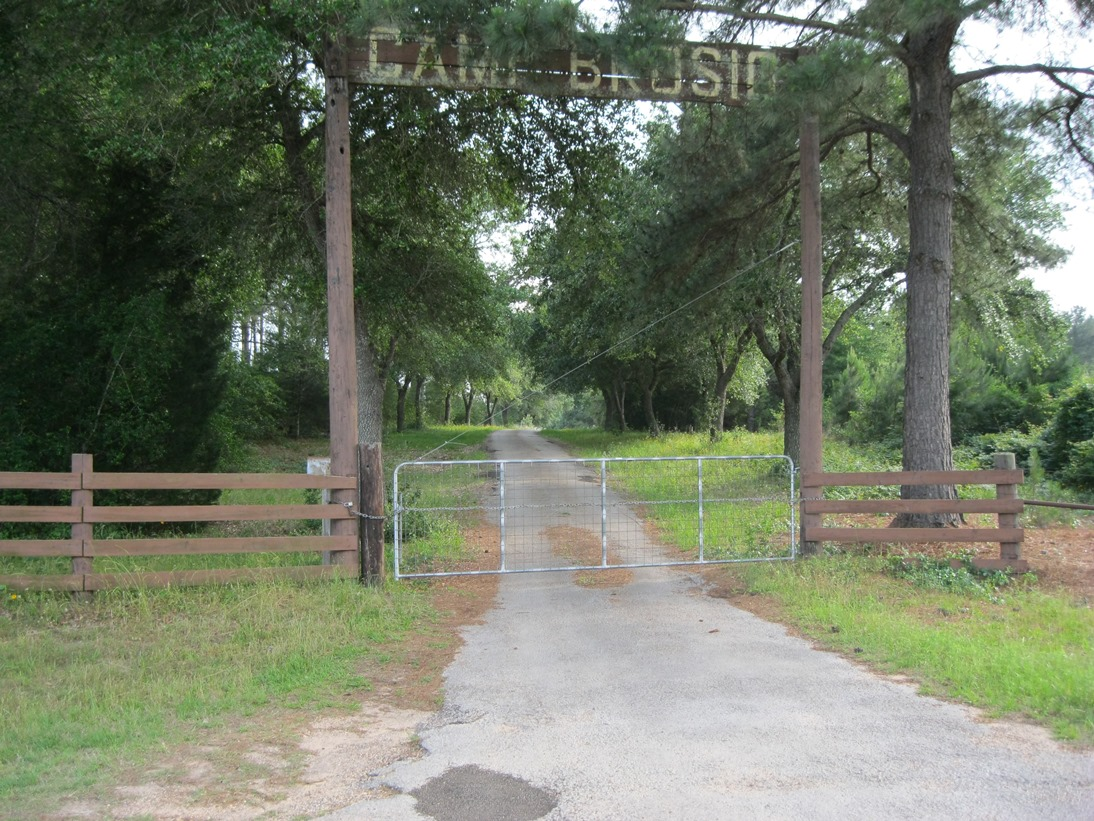
Camp Brosig on Trenckmann Road is owned by Sam Houston Area Council, Boy Scouts of America.

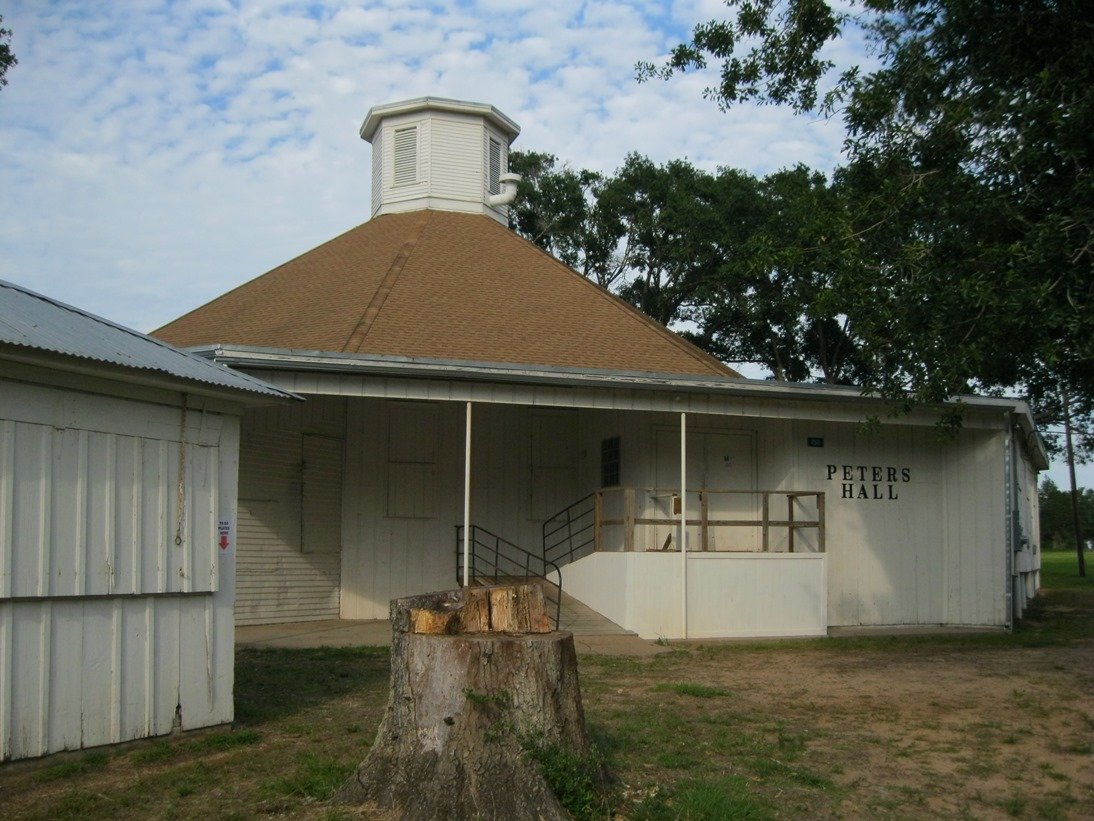
Peters Hall at Trenckmann and Peters San Felipe Roads is an old octagonal dance hall.
