= Matthews, Texas =

- Unincorporated community
- Location within the state of Texas Matthews (the United States)
- Coordinates: 29°30′43″N 96°19′46″W
- Country: United States
- State: Texas
- County: Colorado
- Elevation: 167 ft (51 m)
- Time zone: UTC-6 (Central (CST))
  - Summer (DST): UTC-5 (CDT)
- ZIP code: 77434
- Area code: 979
- GNIS feature ID: 1380884

Matthews is an unincorporated community on the southeastern edge of Colorado County, in the U.S. state of Texas. The community is located south of Eagle Lake near the junction of FM 102 and FM 950. The settlement was named for a man who owned a plantation in the area before the Civil War. By 2013, the school, post office, businesses and railroad line that once served Matthews were gone, but the number of silos in the neighborhood indicated that the land was still being intensively farmed.

== Geography ==
According to the Geographic Names Information System (GNIS), Matthews is located at both 29°29′58″N 96°19′22″W and 29°30′43″N 96°19′46″W. The first location is just south of the intersection of FM 102 and Strickland Lane. The second location is where Matthews Store Road crosses the former railroad right-of-way. A third location is given by the Texas State Historical Association, which describes the community as being situated at the junction of FM 102 and FM 950. The third location is 0.8 miles (1.3 km) northwest of the first GNIS site and 0.2 miles (0.3 km) south of the second GNIS location. Matthews Store Road is an east–west connector of FM 102 and the parallel FM 3013. Matthews is 6.2 miles (10.0 km) south of Eagle Lake and 20.9 miles (33.6 km) northwest of Wharton on FM 102. The community is 6.4 miles (10.3 km) northeast of Garwood on FM 950.

== History ==
In 1827, John Matthews purchased acreage from James Nelson, one of the Old Three Hundred who were granted land in Stephen F. Austin's colony. Matthews started a successful plantation that owned 140 slaves by 1860. The community that formed in the area served Matthews' and other nearby plantations. After the end of the Civil War, many of the freed slaves stayed in the area.

Freed slaves who were descendants of James Montgomery's plantation slaves from Matthews stayed in and around the area and have gone on to great heights. Rev. Daniel Whitley, one of Montgomery's slaves who was emancipated after the American Civil War, went on to be a minister in both Columbus and in Eagle Lake. His grandson, John Whitley, who was raised in the house of Whitley's daughter Cordelia and her husband after both his father and mother had died, became a noted art restorer and intimate of J. Frank Dobie who at one time restored all of the paintings hanging in the Texas Capitol. Cordelia's husband, Daniel Whitley's son-in-law, Cicero Howard, was the second black man elected to public office in Colorado County at the county level, and the first black Colorado County Commissioner.

The Matthews Community settlement boasted a blacksmith shop, a cotton gin and a store in 1880. The community acquired a post office in 1895 with Mary McRee serving as postmaster. In 1898 the Cane Belt Railroad was chartered. By June 1899, the railroad stretched from Eagle Lake to Wharton. The Cane Belt was bought by the Atchison, Topeka and Santa Fe Railway in 1904.

In 1900, Matthews had four commercial establishments, a school and 100 residents. The post office closed in 1905 and mail began to be delivered from Eagle Lake. The population remained steady until the 1960s when the hand-picked cotton harvests were replaced by mechanized rice and corn production. By the mid-1980s there was only one local business. The railroad through the area was abandoned in 1992 and the tracks removed. The former railroad right-of-way running parallel with FM 102 near Matthews can be easily seen in satellite views.

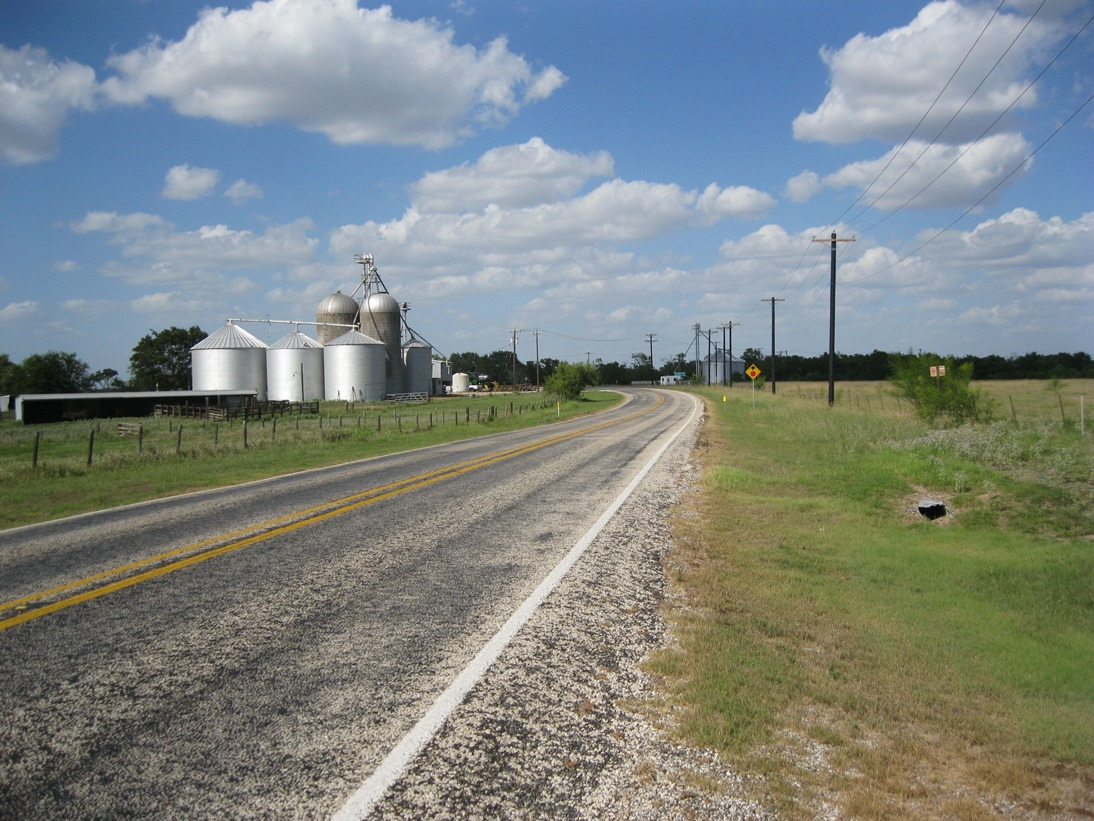
Silos along FM 950 as it approaches FM 102

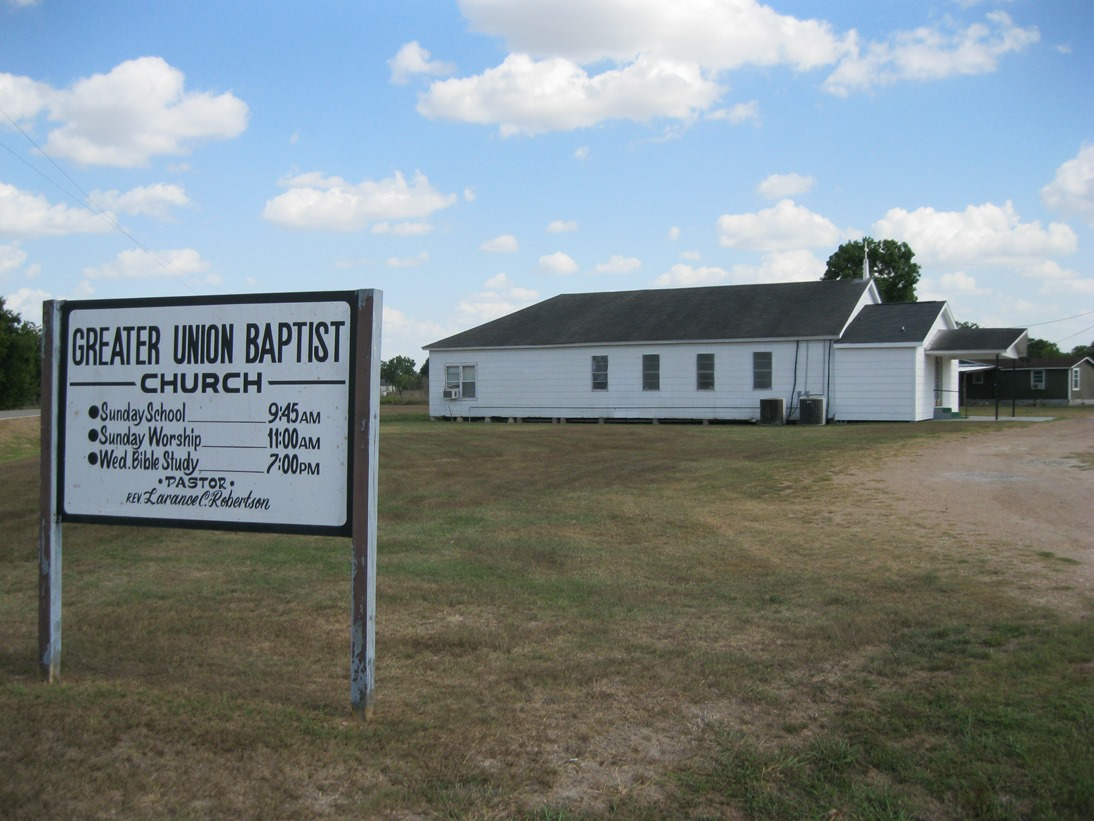
Greater Union Baptist Church at FM 102 and Strickland Lane

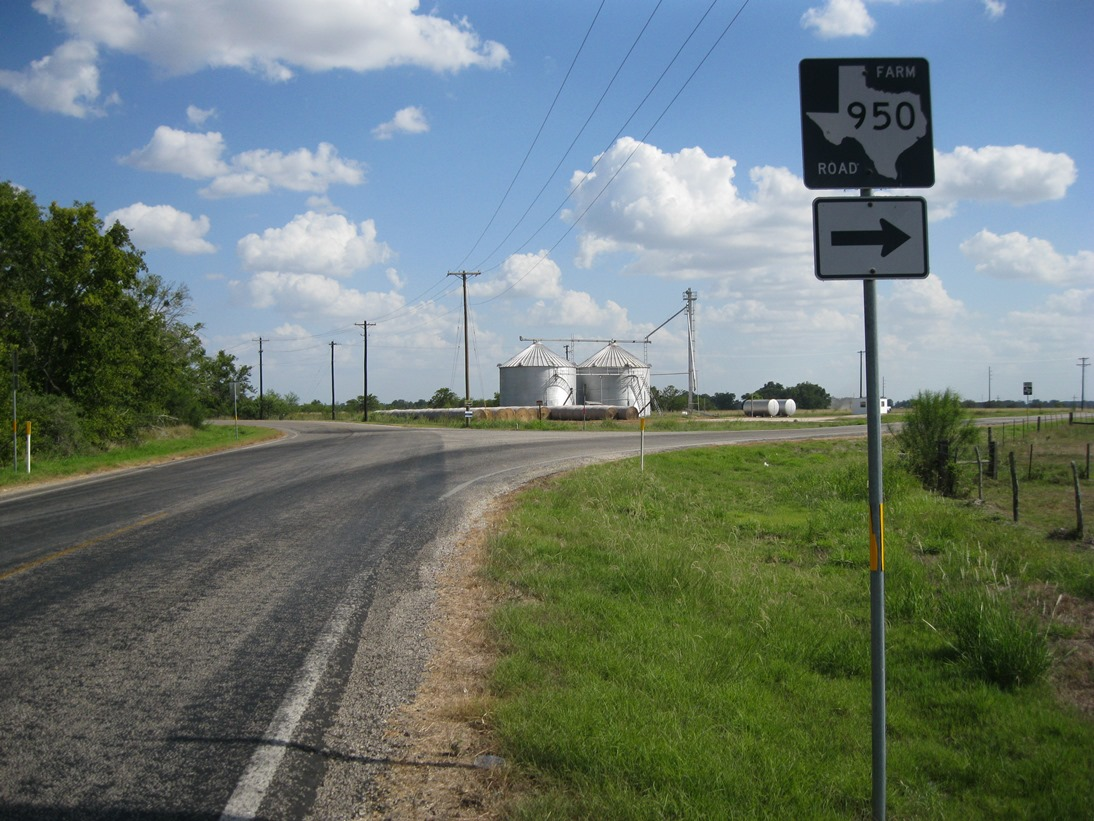
Junction of FM 102 and FM 950 at Matthews
