= Joseph Kellman =

American businessman

- Born: January 7, 1920; Chicago, Illinois, U.S.
- Died: January 7, 2010 (aged 90); Egypt, Texas, U.S.
- Education: 9th grade Harrison Technical High School, partial completion
- Occupations: Businessman, boxing promoter, racehorse owner/breeder, philanthropist
- Known for: Better Boys Foundation, Kellman Corporate Community School
- Spouse: Lou Anne Kellman
- Children: Jack, Celia "Cissy", Richard

Joseph Kellman (January 7, 1920 – January 7, 2010) was an American businessman and philanthropist.

== Early life and business ==
Born in Chicago, Illinois, he grew up in the Lawndale neighborhood. Due to the Great Depression, Kellman left school in the 9th grade to work in his father's glass shop. Together with his brother, Kellman inherited their father's glass business. At one point the country's largest auto glass chain, in 1997, it merged with Safelite AutoGlass, which is part of Belron US.

== Thoroughbred racing ==
An owner and breeder of Thoroughbred racehorses, as part of his bloodstock Joseph Kellman owned the broodmare Lester's Pride. He named her foals after his friends in the entertainment industry. A colt named for Phil Foster became a stakes winner and the filly Ivy Hackett was named for the daughter of Buddy Hackett.

In 1973 Kellman met with considerable success with Shecky Greene, named for the comedian Shecky Greene. Among his wins, the colt captured the 1973 Hutcheson Stakes, Fountain of Youth Stakes, Arlington-Washington Futurity Stakes, and the Stepping Stone Purse en route to earning 1973 American Champion Sprint Horse honors.

== Better Boys Foundation ==
In 1961, with the help of Buddy Hackett, Kellman founded the Better Boys Foundation, currently named BBF Family Services, to help one of the nation's most disadvantaged inner city neighborhoods. The Better Boys Foundation offers youth participants tutoring and mentoring for academic enhancement and high school graduation, leadership training, cultural diversity and social skills training.

== Corporate/Community Schools of America ==
In 1988 he established the country's first business-sponsored elementary school, the Joseph Kellman Corporate Community Elementary School in impoverished North Lawndale. The philosophy behind the project was to applying the techniques that are common in business to public education and to improve the learning environment in inner-city public schools. As of 2019, the school is part of the Chicago Public Schools system and has a Technology Magnet Program and Early Children's Literacy Program. It grants each graduate a laptop or tablet.
