= Egypt, Wharton County, Texas =

Egypt, Texas
- Unincorporated community
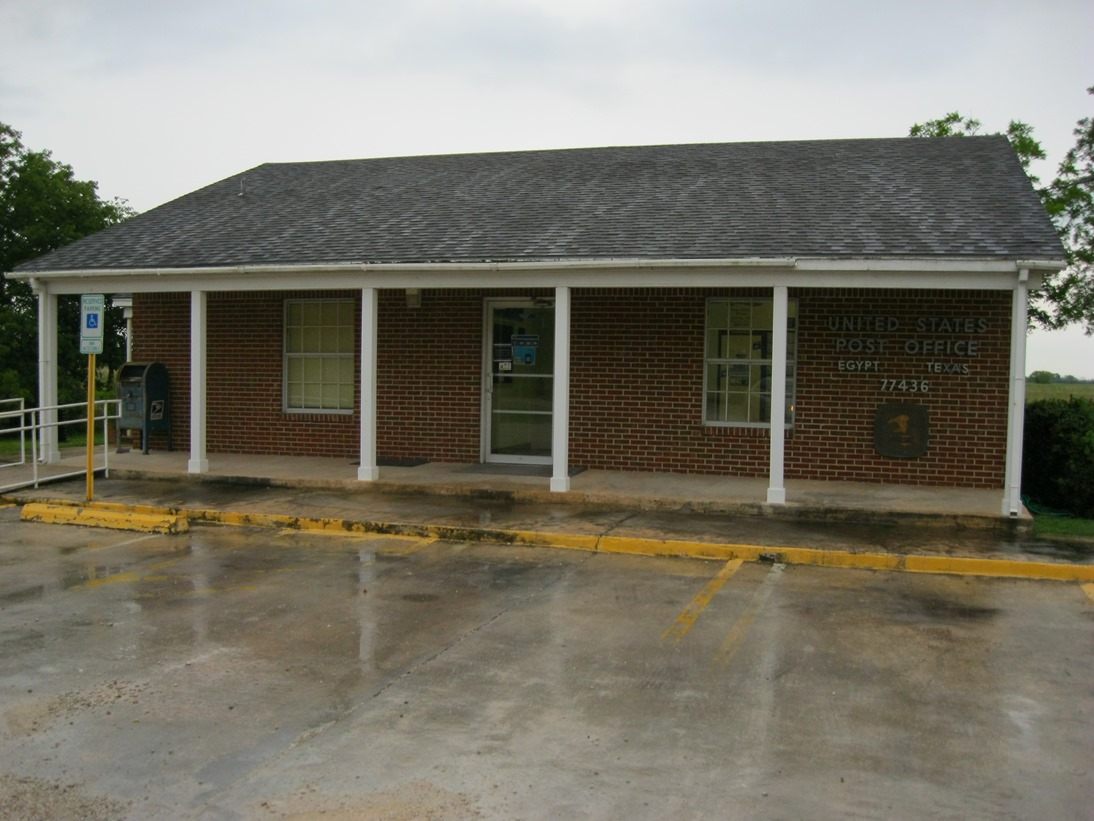
- Post office

- Location within the state of Texas Egypt, Texas (the United States)
- Coordinates: 29°24′18″N 96°14′13″W
- Country: United States
- State: Texas
- County: Wharton
- Elevation: 131 ft (40 m)
- Time zone: UTC-6 (Central (CST))
  - Summer (DST): UTC-5 (CDT)
- ZIP code: 77436
- Area code: 979
- GNIS: 1335133

Egypt is an unincorporated community in northern Wharton County in the U.S. state of Texas. According to the Handbook of Texas, the community had a population of 26 in 2000. It is located within the Greater Houston metropolitan area.

== History ==
Egypt was founded before any other settlement in Wharton County and was a part of Colorado County during the Republic of Texas period. Egypt is located on John C. Clark's league of land. Robert Kuykendall had land below Egypt, and Thomas Rabb had land north of the community. These three men were members of the Old Three Hundred. The community had a population of 26 in 2000.

Egypt's 1827 name change from "Mercer's Crossing" came from the Bible, and originated from the text of Genesis 42:1-3.

On August 26, 2017, a tornado debris signature was spotted on the radar just south of Egypt.

== Geography ==
Egypt is located on Farm to Market Road 102, 11 mi (18 km) northwest of Wharton in Wharton County.

== Education ==
Egypt had a school district from 1854 to 1958, when it joined the Hungerford Independent School District. Today, the community is served by the El Campo Independent School District.

== Cultural significance ==
Horton Foote's 1980 play A Coffin in Egypt is a fictionalized portrait of a real-life Egypt resident. Leonard Foglia and Ricky Ian Gordon adapted the play into an opera, also called A Coffin in Egypt, that was premiered by Houston Grand Opera in 2014.

== Notable person ==
- Joseph Kellman, businessman and philanthropist
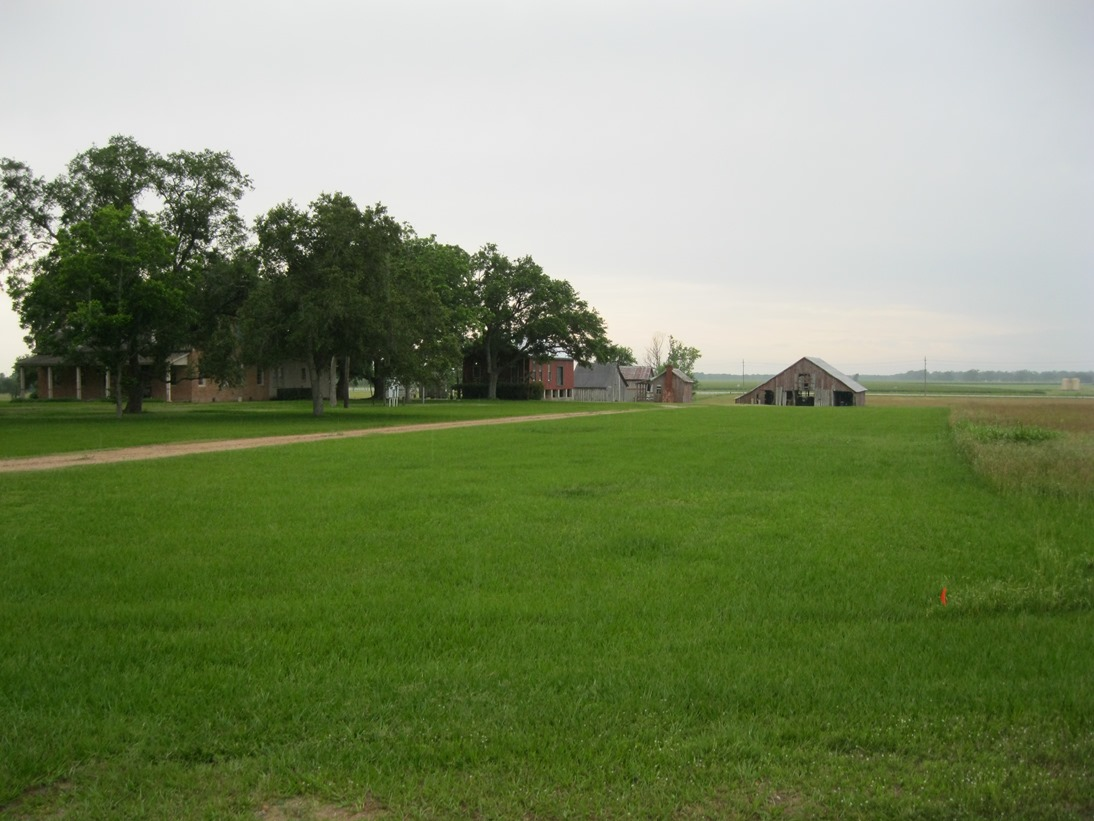
Heard-Northington Plantation
