= Farm to Market Road 102 =

Highway

Farm to Market Road 102

Route information
- Maintained by TxDOT
- Length: 38.845 mi (62.515 km)
- Existed: May 18, 1944–present

Major junctions
- South end: Future I-69 / US 59 in Wharton
- US 90 Alt. in Eagle Lake
- North end: I-10 / US 90 near Alleyton

Location
- Country: United States
- State: Texas
- Counties: Colorado, Wharton

Highway system
- Highways in Texas; Interstate; US; State; Former; Toll; Loops; Spurs; FM/RM; Park; Rec
← FM 101	→ FM 103

Farm to Market Road 102 (FM 102) is a state highway in the U.S. state of Texas. The highway begins at U.S. Route 59/Future I-69 in Wharton in Wharton County. It heads northwest through Eagle Lake in Colorado County and ends at Interstate 10 (I-10) near Alleyton, which is just east of Columbus in Colorado County.

== Route description ==
FM 102 begins at the Future I-69/US 59 overpass. Future I-69/US 59 can be accessed in both directions via entrance ramps from the frontage road. After continuing west-northwest, a distance of 3.5 miles (5.6 km), the highway reaches the intersection with FM 640 near the former community of Sorrelle. An additional 1.1 miles (1.8 km) brings the traveler to Glen Flora and its junction with FM 960. As it leaves Glen Flora, FM 102 turns to the northwest. From there to FM 1161 in Egypt is 5 miles (8.0 km). From Egypt to the intersection with FM 2614 in Bonus is 3.7 miles (6.0 km). After briefly swerving to the north near Bonus, FM 102 turns back to the northwest for 3.6 miles (5.8 km) before intersecting with FM 3013. At the junction, FM 102 splits off to the left while FM 3013 bears to the right and takes a parallel route to Eagle Lake.

FM 102 leaves Wharton County shortly after passing FM 3013 and goes 2.0 miles (3.2 km) before arriving at the intersection with FM 950 near Matthews. From FM 950 to US 90 Alt. in Eagle Lake is 5.5 miles (8.9 km). In the last part of this stretch, FM 102 is called Lakeside Drive and the lake is to the west. The highway turns left (northwest) onto Main Street and shares its right-of-way with US 90 Alt. for 0.4 miles (0.6 km). When US 90 forks to the left, FM 102 goes straight on Main Street into downtown Eagle Lake. At McCarty Avenue in front of the municipal building, the highway turns right for one block and crosses the Union Pacific Railroad before turning left on West Post Office Street. Within a few blocks, FM 102 leaves Eagle Lake behind as it heads northwest alongside the railroad tracks. From US 90 Alt. in Eagle Lake to FM 949 at Ramsey is 6.9 miles (11.1 km). Near Ramsey, the highway curves to the right, away from the railroad, and enters an area that is hilly and forested. From FM 949 to the underpass at I-10 and U.S. Route 90 (US 90) is a distance of 6.0 miles (9.7 km). In the last mile of FM 102, the highway passes the small community of Alleyton. Traffic can access I-10 east and west by using entrance ramps from the frontage road.

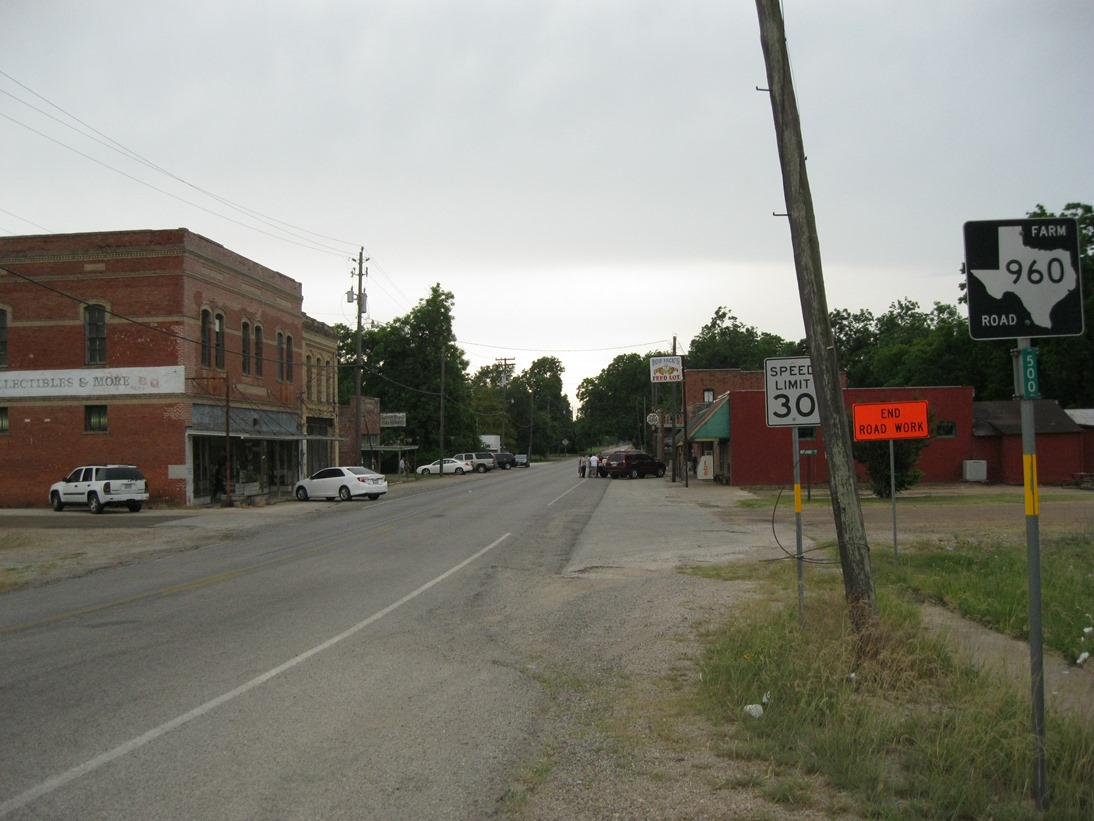
View of Glen Flora is looking southwest from near FM 102.

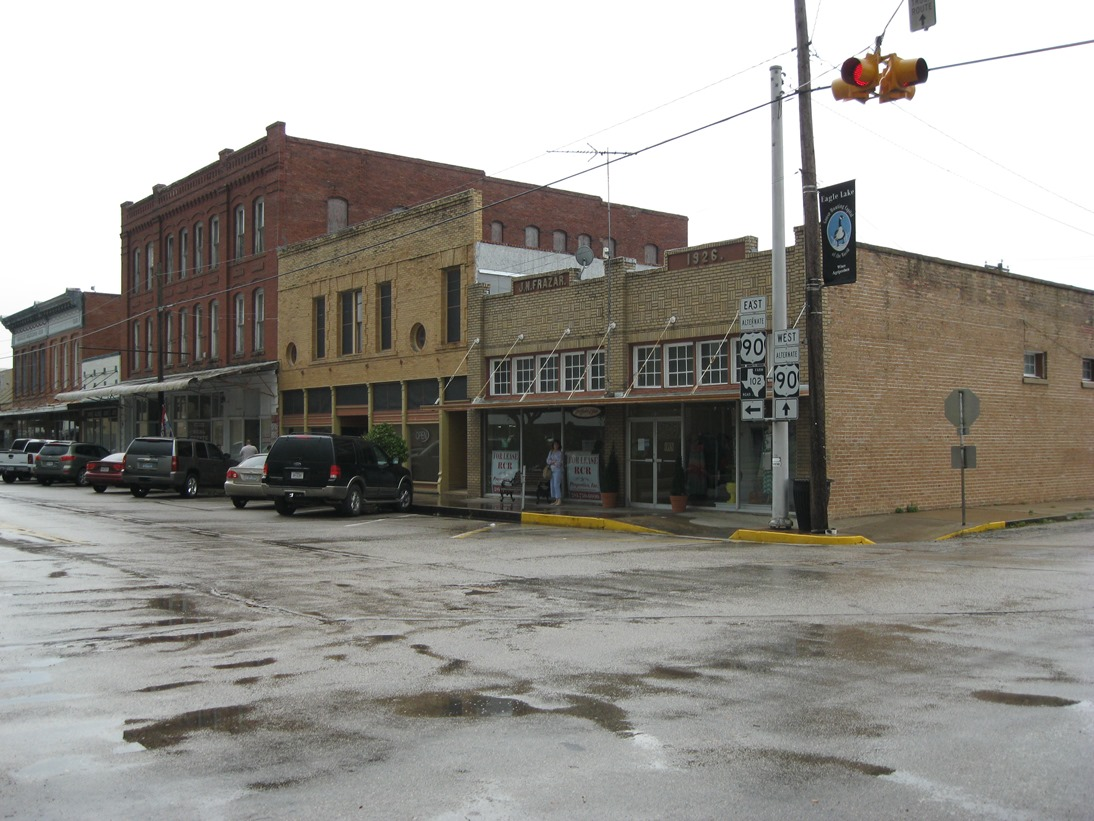
View is southeast on Main St at McCarty St in Eagle Lake.

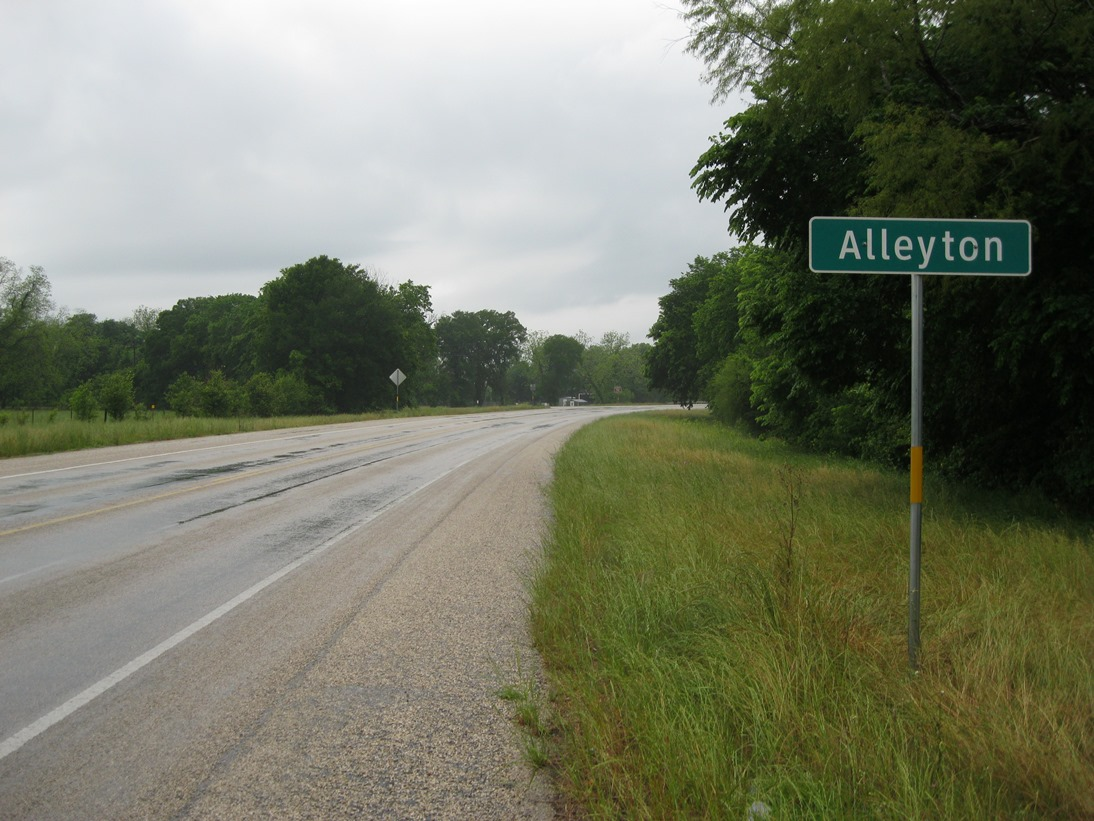
View is looking north along FM 102 at Alleyton.

== History ==
FM 102 was originally designated on May 18, 1944, to begin in Wharton and proceed northwest to Egypt. On June 13, 1945, a second section of the highway was started at US 90 Alt. in Eagle Lake and ran south to the Wharton County line. On July 9, 1945, the two separate sections were linked when a new section between Egypt and the Wharton–Colorado county line was added. At this time, FM 102 ran continuously from Wharton to Eagle Lake. On March 28, 1952, FM 102 was extended about 14 miles (22.5 km) northwest from Eagle Lake to US 90 east of Columbus. This route ran over the old US 90 Alt. right-of-way. On May 22, 1958, a 0.5 miles (0.8 km) portion of the former US 90 Alt. right-of-way in Eagle Lake was transferred to FM 102. Of this distance, 0.2 miles (0.3 km) was a spur route. A 0.4 miles (0.6 km) spur was added near Alleyton on June 28, 1963. A 1.6 miles (2.6 km) section of FM 102 near Alleyton was canceled on October 28, 1966 and the former Alleyton spur became the main route. South Alleyton Road, which is 1.6 miles (2.6 km) long, starts at FM 102 and goes west around the south side of Alleyton before ending at the I-10 frontage road. On June 30, 1976, FM 102 was designated as starting at Loop 183 in Wharton instead of at the old US 59, since what is now I-69/US 59 was moved to a new location. Loop 183 was redesignated as Bus. I-69/Bus. US 59 on October 29, 1998. On September 25, 2025, the section east of US 59/Future I-69 was given to the city of Wharton.

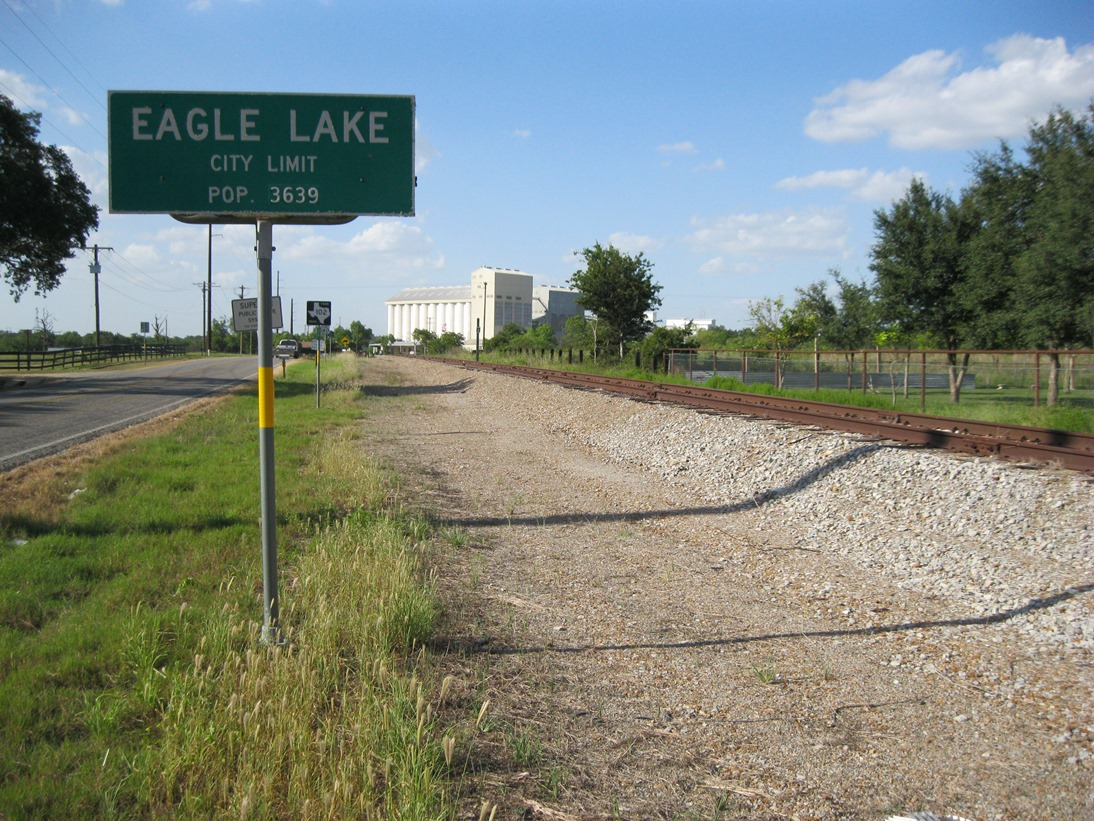
City limit sign has Eagle Lake Rice Dryer in the background.

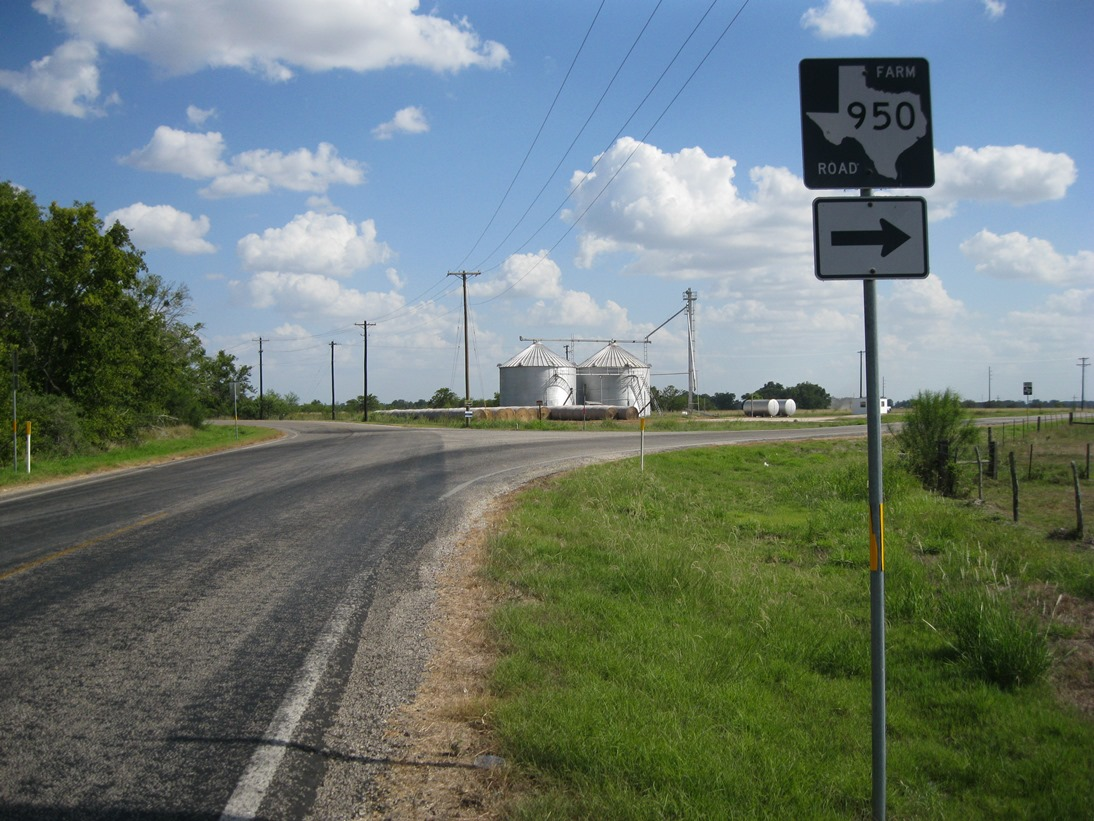
FM 102 intersects with FM 950 at Matthews.

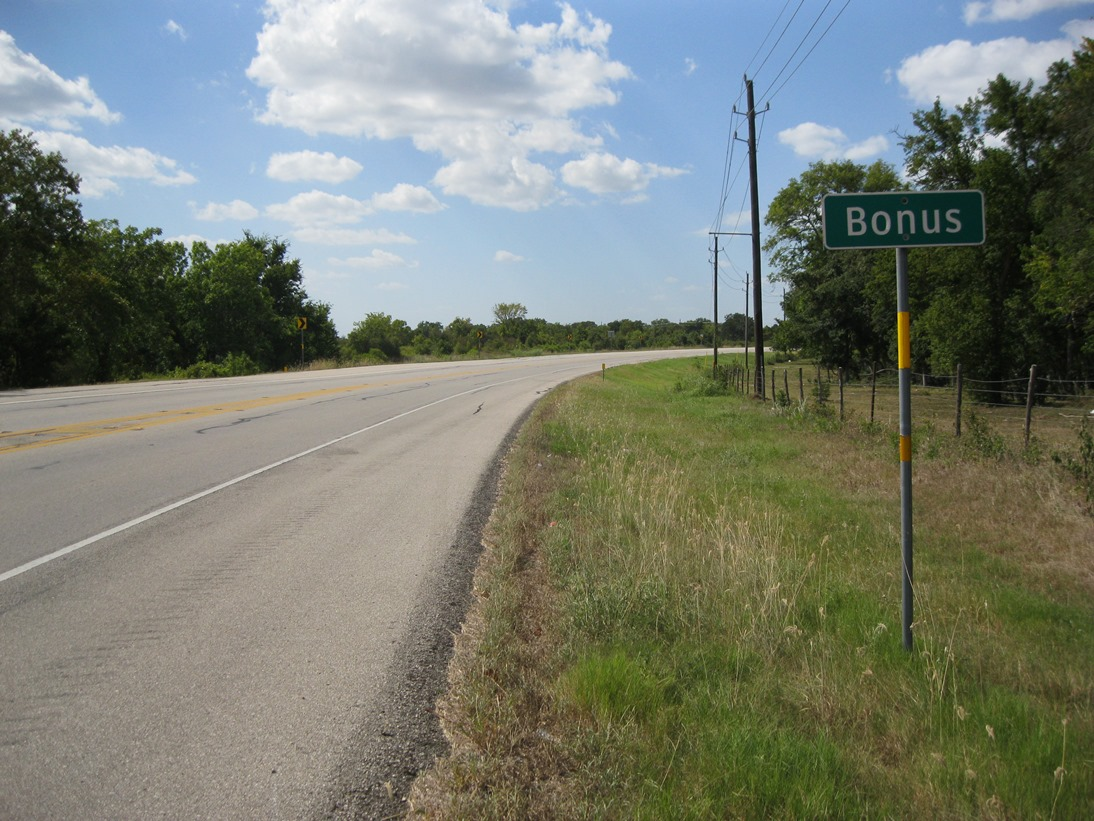
Bonus sign is on FM 102 north of the FM 2614 junction.

== Major intersections ==
County	Location	mi	km	Destinations	Notes
Wharton	Wharton	0.0	0.0	Future I-69 / US 59 – El Campo, Rosenberg, Houston	Exit 72 on I-69/US 59; U.S. 59 is the future Interstate 69; Southern terminus of FM 102
Wharton	Sorrelle	3.5	5.6	FM 640 – Spanish Camp	Southern terminus of FM 640
Wharton	Glen Flora	4.6	7.4	FM 960 – El Campo	Northern terminus of FM 960
Wharton	Egypt	9.6	15.4	FM 1161 – Spanish Camp, Hungerford	Western terminus of FM 1161
Wharton	Bonus	13.4	21.6	FM 2614 – Elm Grove	Southern terminus of FM 2614
Wharton	McDow	16.9	27.2	FM 3013 – Eagle Lake	Southern terminus of FM 3013
Colorado	Matthews	18.9	30.4	FM 950 – Garwood	Northern terminus of FM 950
Colorado	Eagle Lake	24.4	39.3	US 90 Alt. – East Bernard	Start of concurrency with US 90 Alt.
Colorado	Eagle Lake	24.8	39.9	US 90 Alt. – Altair	End of concurrency with US 90 Alt.
Colorado	Ramsey	31.7	51.0	FM 949 – Cat Spring	Southern terminus of FM 949
Colorado	Alleyton	37.7	60.7	I-10 / US 90 – San Antonio, Columbus, Sealy, Houston	I-10 exit 699; northern terminus of FM 102
1.000 mi = 1.609 km; 1.000 km = 0.621 mi
