= Eldridge, Texas =

- Unincorporated community
- Location within Texas Location within the United States
- Coordinates: 29°28′5″N 96°21′19″W
- Country: United States
- State: Texas
- County: Colorado
- Elevation: 144 ft (44 m)
- Time zone: UTC-6 (Central (CST))
  - Summer (DST): UTC-5 (CDT)
- Area code: 979
- GNIS feature ID: 1378251

Eldridge is an unincorporated community in Colorado County, Texas, United States. According to the Handbook of Texas, the community had a population of 20 in 2000.

== Geography ==
Eldridge is located at the intersection of Farm to Market Roads 950 and 2614, between Garwood and Eagle Lake in southeastern Colorado County.

== Education ==
Today, Eldridge is served by the Rice Consolidated Independent School District.
