= Eagle Lake, Texas =

City in Colorado County, Texas, U.S.

Eagle Lake
- City
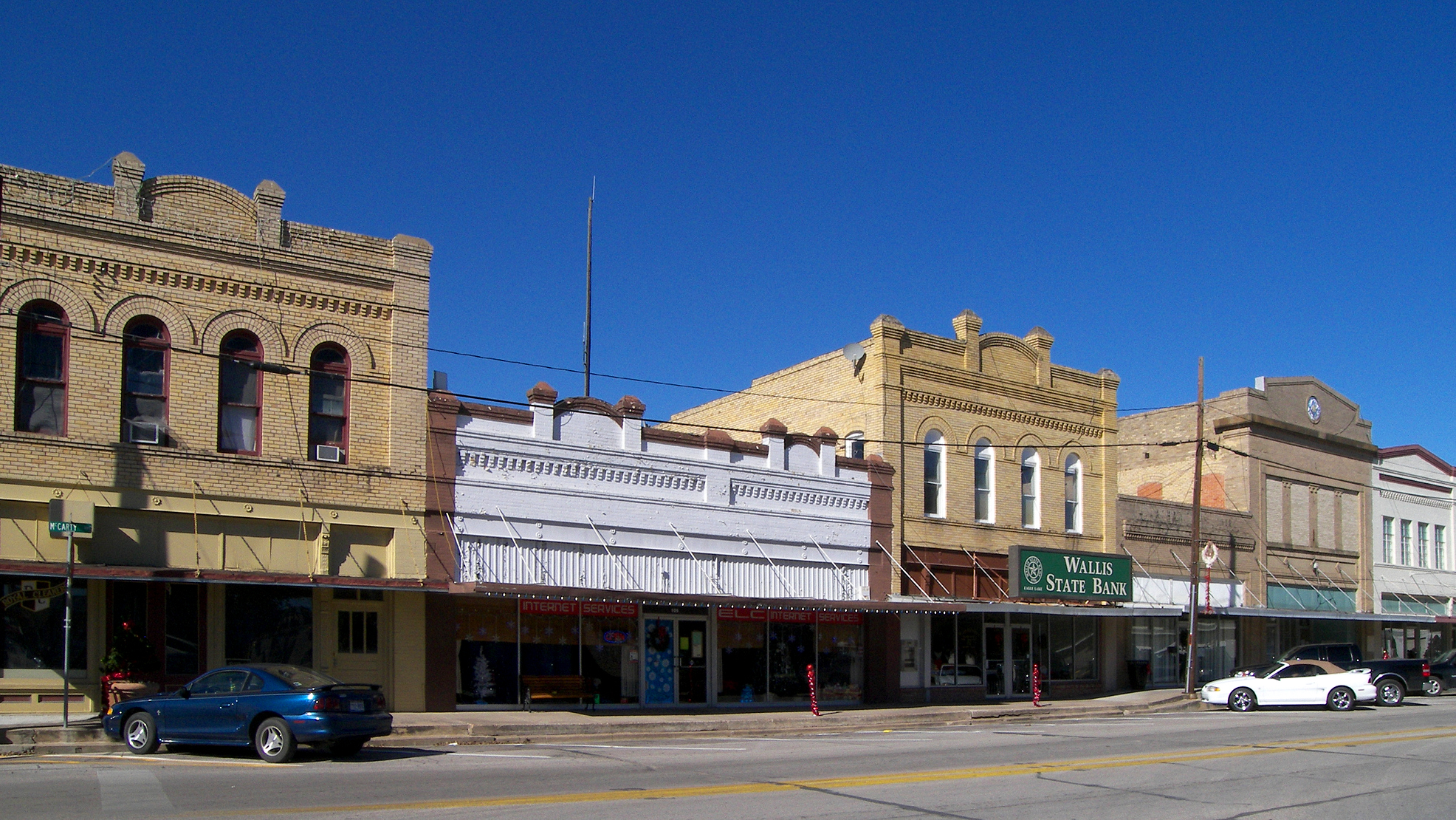
- The 100 block of McCarty Ave, part of the Eagle Lake Commercial Historic District

- Location of Eagle Lake, Texas
- Coordinates: 29°35′16″N 96°19′48″W
- Country: United States
- State: Texas
- County: Colorado

Area
  - Total: 2.94 sq mi (7.61 km^{2})
  - Land: 2.93 sq mi (7.59 km^{2})
  - Water: 0.0077 sq mi (0.02 km^{2})
- Elevation: 174 ft (53 m)

Population (2020)
  - Total: 3,442
  - Density: 1,288.6/sq mi (497.54/km^{2})
- Time zone: UTC-6 (Central (CST))
  - Summer (DST): UTC-5 (CDT)
- ZIP code: 77434
- Area code: 979
- FIPS code: 48-21844
- GNIS feature ID: 1334847
- Website: coeltx.net

Eagle Lake is a city in southeastern Colorado County, Texas, United States. The population was 3,442 at the 2020 census. It is home to a golf course, the largest private lake in Texas, and the Eagle Lake Regional Airport, which serves light aircraft.

The lake, along with adjacent rice paddies, attracts a large variety of migratory birds. The city is known as the "Goose-hunting Capital of the World" and also borders a wildlife preserve.

== History ==
The first newspaper in Eagle Lake was established by Joseph J. Mansfield in 1888.

== Geography ==
Eagle Lake is located in eastern Colorado County at 29°35′16″N 96°19′48″W.

U.S. Route 90 Alternate (US 90 Alt.) travels through Eagle Lake, leading east 66 miles (106 km) to Houston and west 38 miles (61 km) to Hallettsville. Eagle Lake is 16 miles (26 km) southeast of Columbus, the Colorado County seat.

According to the United States Census Bureau, the city of Eagle Lake has a total area of 2.8 square miles (7.2 km^{2}), of which 0.004 square miles (0.01 km^{2}), or 0.19%, is covered by water.

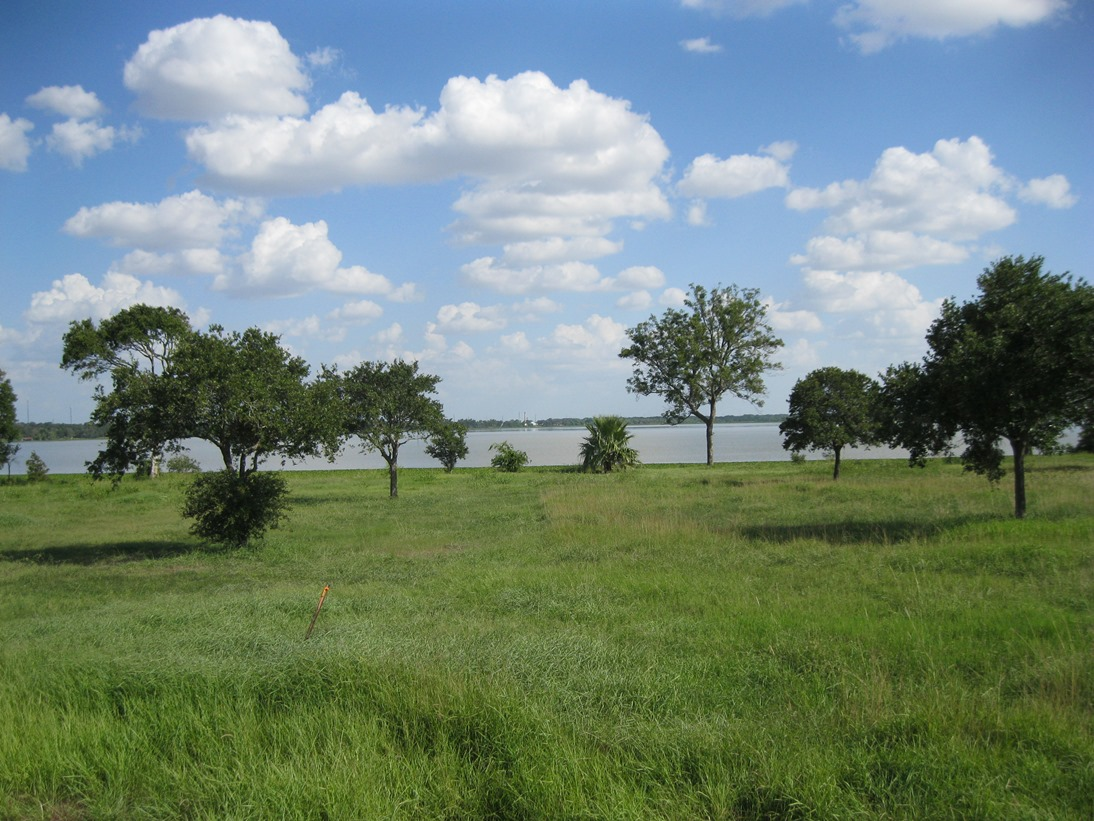
The eponymous Eagle Lake from the north side

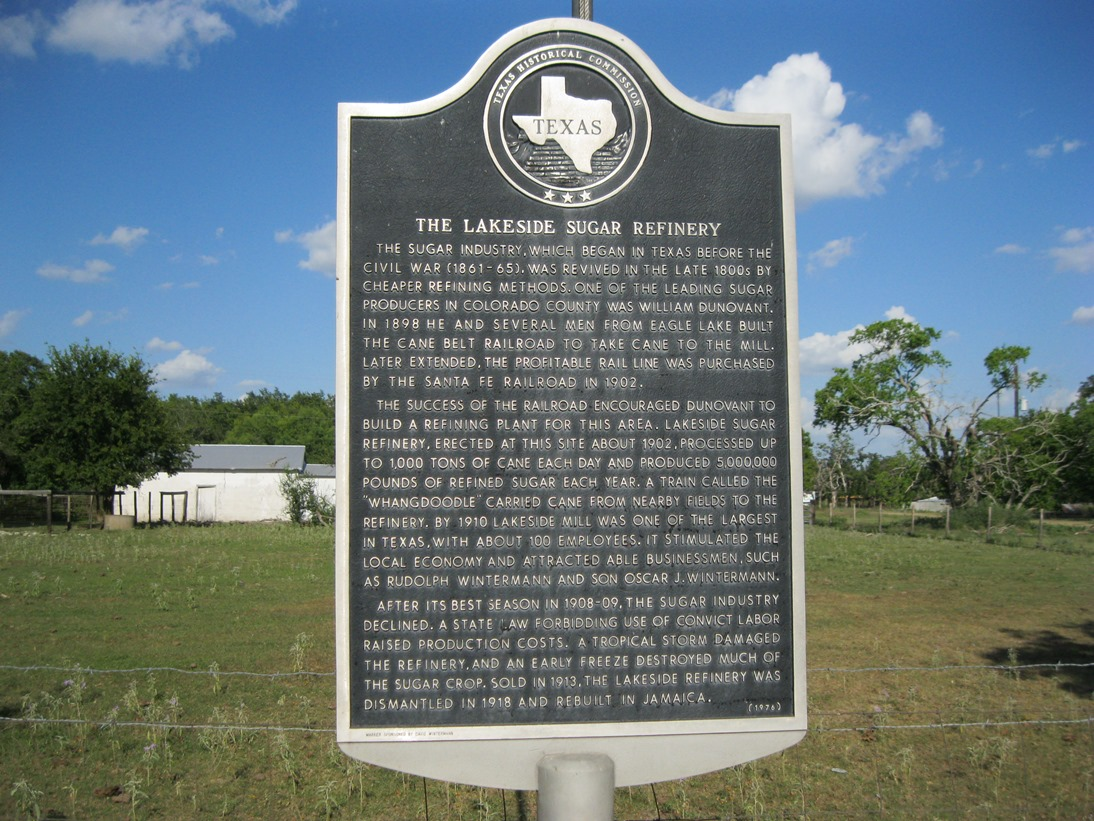
Site of a sugar cane factory on FM 102

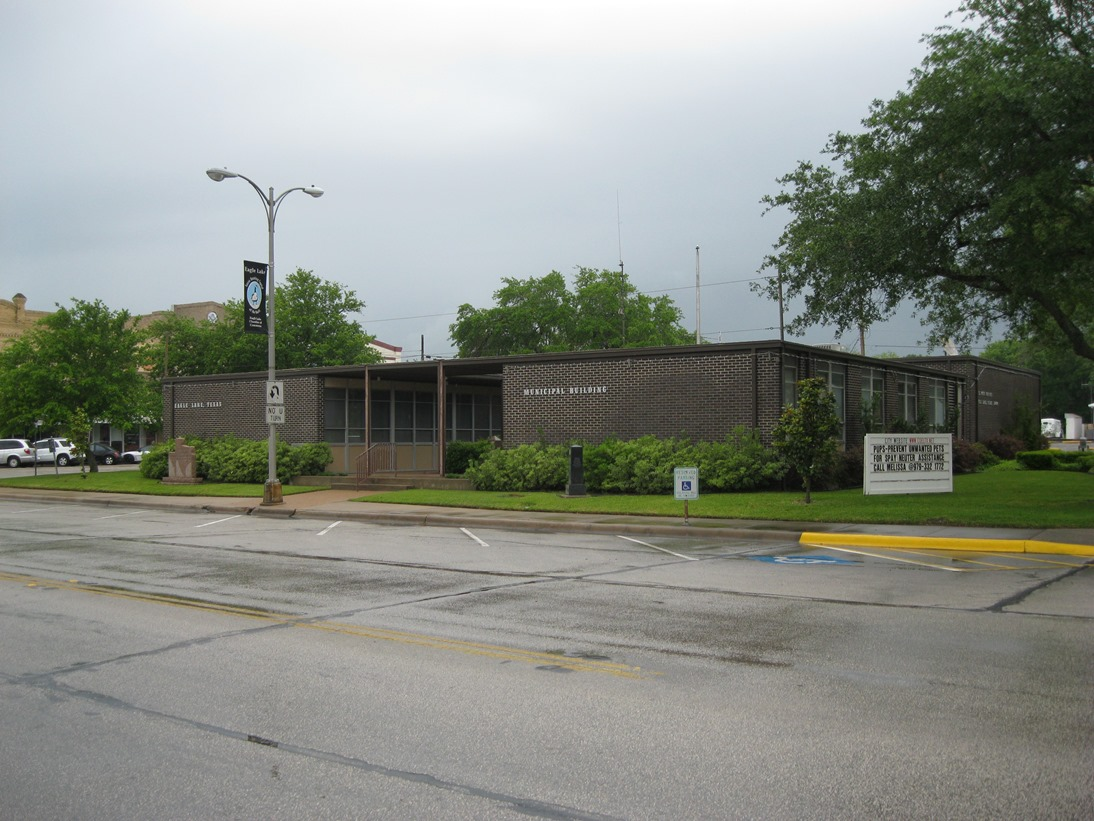
Municipal building on FM 102 in downtown area

== Demographics ==
Historical population
Census	Pop.	Note	%±
1880	406		—
1890	769		89.4%
1900	1,107		44.0%
1910	1,717		55.1%
1920	2,017		17.5%
1930	2,343		16.2%
1940	2,124		−9.3%
1950	2,787		31.2%
1960	3,565		27.9%
1970	3,587		0.6%
1980	3,921		9.3%
1990	3,551		−9.4%
2000	3,664		3.2%
2010	3,639		−0.7%
2020	3,442		−5.4%
U.S. Decennial Census

=== 2020 census ===
As of the 2020 census, Eagle Lake had a population of 3,442. The median age was 37.4 years. 27.0% of residents were under the age of 18 and 16.6% of residents were 65 years of age or older. For every 100 females there were 94.5 males, and for every 100 females age 18 and over there were 90.7 males age 18 and over.

0.0% of residents lived in urban areas, while 100.0% lived in rural areas.

There were 1,258 households in Eagle Lake, of which 36.8% had children under the age of 18 living in them. Of all households, 44.0% were married-couple households, 19.8% were households with a male householder and no spouse or partner present, and 29.7% were households with a female householder and no spouse or partner present. About 26.0% of all households were made up of individuals and 11.5% had someone living alone who was 65 years of age or older.

There were 1,372 housing units, of which 8.3% were vacant. The homeowner vacancy rate was 0.8% and the rental vacancy rate was 10.6%.

Racial composition as of the 2020 census
Race	Number	Percent
White	1,203	35.0%
Black or African American	728	21.2%
American Indian and Alaska Native	26	0.8%
Asian	8	0.2%
Native Hawaiian and Other Pacific Islander	0	0.0%
Some other race	923	26.8%
Two or more races	554	16.1%
Hispanic or Latino (of any race)	2,017	58.6%

=== 2000 census ===
As of the 2000 United States census, 3,664 people, 1,296 households, and 935 families resided in the city. The population density was 1,344.6 inhabitants per square mile (519.2/km^{2}). The 1,500 housing units averaged 550.5/sq mi (212.9/km^{2}). The racial makeup of the city was 52.78% White, 23.39% African American, 0.66% Native American, 0.03% Pacific Islander, 20.47% from other races, and 2.67% from two or more races. Hispanics or Latinos of any race were 44.21% of the population.

Of the 1,296 households, 36.3% had children under the age of 18 living with them, 52.0% were married couples living together, 16.5% had a female householder with no husband present, and 27.8% were not families. About 23.8% of all households were made up of individuals, and 11.5% had someone living alone who was 65 years of age or older. The average household size was 2.78 and the average family size was 3.31.

In the city, the population was distributed as 29.9% under the age of 18, 9.2% from 18 to 24, 25.0% from 25 to 44, 22.0% from 45 to 64, and 13.9% who were 65 years of age or older. The median age was 34 years. For every 100 females, there were 95.9 males. For every 100 females age 18 and over, there were 91.9 males.

== Economy ==
Historically, Eagle Lake has been an agricultural community, with rice being the main crop. Other key products include cotton, grain, and cattle, along with sand and gravel from mines in the surrounding area.

In the 2000 census, the median income for a household in the city was $27,101, and for a family was $29,201. Males had a median income of $26,025 versus $20,299 for females. The per capita income for the city was $12,426. About 15.0% of families and 19.7% of the population were below the poverty line, including 24.0% of those under age 18 and 17.8% of those age 65 or over.

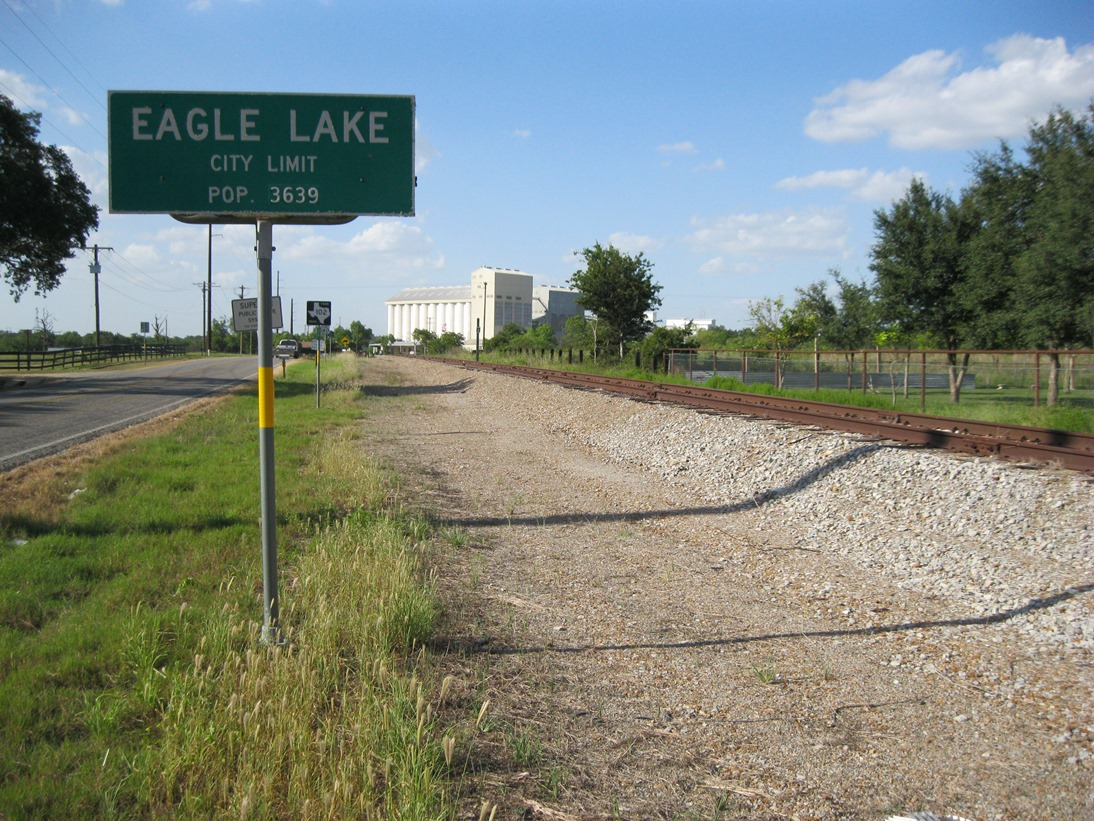
City limit sign with Eagle Lake Rice Dryer in the background

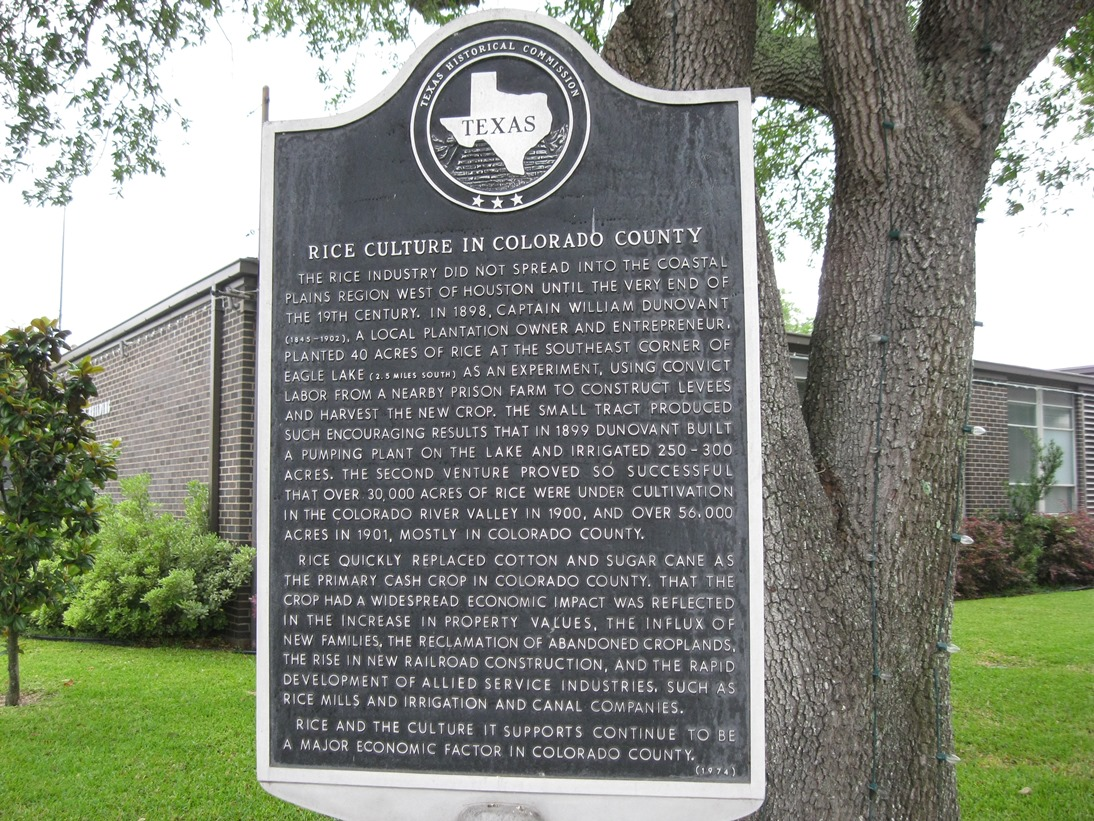
Historical marker explains Eagle Lake's rice farming

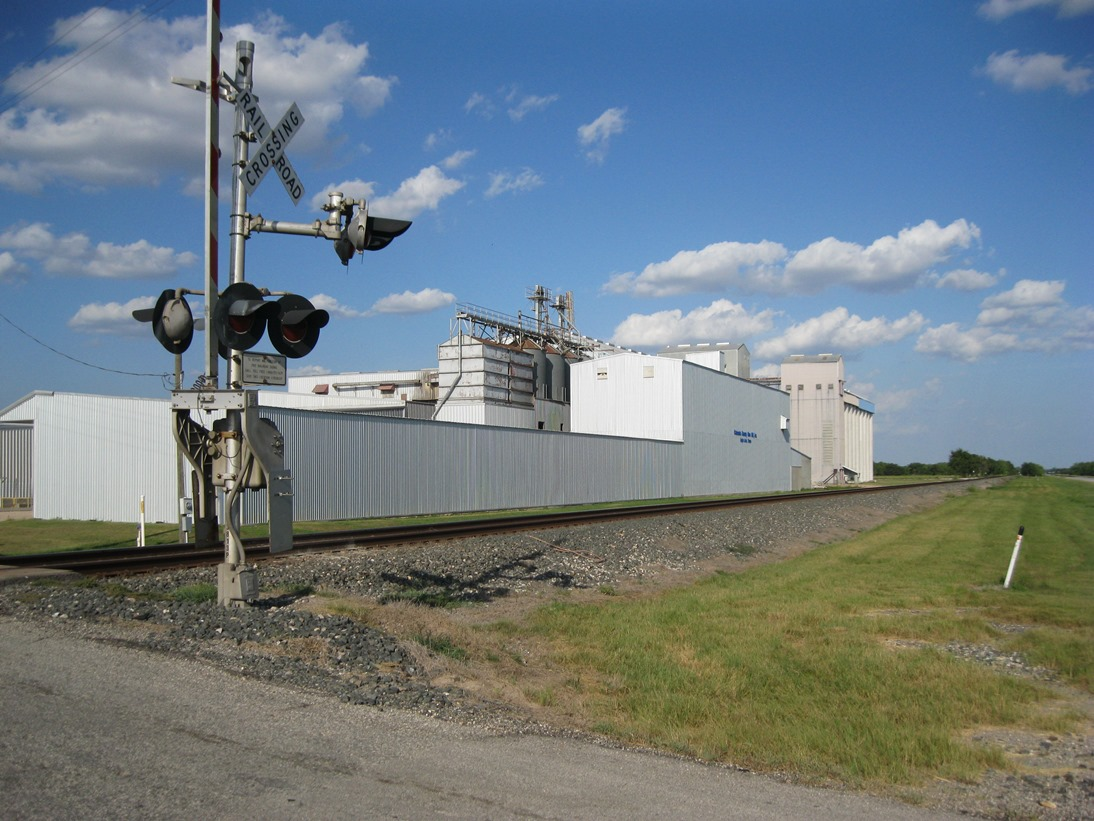
Colorado County Rice Mill on US 90A and Union Pacific Railroad

A Union Pacific train on the spur to A&K Railroad Materials.

== Education ==
Eagle Lake is served by the Rice Consolidated Independent School District.

The Eula and David Wintermann Library is the public library in the city, opened on February 9, 1975. Mr. and Mrs. David R. Wintermann had originally proposed to erect and furnish the new library building in 1973. Architect for the project was Arthur J. Willrodt of Columbus, Texas. It replaced the existing library, which was housed in a small portion of the Community Center.

The designated community college for Rice CISD is Wharton County Junior College.

== Notable people ==
- Howie Fitzgerald (1902–1959), professional baseball player
- Ryan Trahan (born 1998), YouTube creator and entrepreneur

== Media ==
The city is served by a weekly newspaper, the Colorado County Citizen.

== See also ==
- Continental Express Flight 2574
