= Wadsworth, Texas =

Unincorporated community in Texas, US

Wadsworth is an unincorporated community in Matagorda County, Texas, United States. As of the 2020 census, Wadsworth had a population of 302.

== Geography ==
Wadsworth is located at 28°49′21″N 95°55′39″W . It is situated at the junction of State Highway 60 and Farm Roads 521 and 2078 in south central Matagorda County, approximately eleven miles south of Bay City.

=== Climate ===
The climate in this area is characterized by hot, humid summers and generally mild to cool winters. According to the Köppen Climate Classification system, Wadsworth has a humid subtropical climate, abbreviated "Cfa" on climate maps.

== History ==
On October 11, 1902, Ambrose A. Plotner and John W. Stoddard purchased a tract of land known as the Kemp pasture. They formed the Colonial Land Company, which founded Wadsworth – named for William Wadsworth, an early settler in the area. The community became a stop on the Gulf, Colorado, and Santa Fe Railroad and a post office was established in 1907. The population was estimated at 150 in 1914. That figure had risen to nearly 925 in 1925. By the 1930s, Wadsworth had its own school district.

The community went into decline and by 1940, the population had fallen to 400. Wadsworth's school was consolidated with Bay City in 1949. In 1990, approximately 152 people lived in Wadsworth. By 2000, that number had risen slightly to 160.

Wadsworth has a post office with the ZIP code 77483. There are also three convenience stores in the community.

== Demographics ==
Historical population
Census	Pop.	Note	%±
2020	302		—
U.S. Decennial Census; 1850–1900 1910; 1920 1930 1940; 1950 1960 1970; 1980 1990 2000; 2010 2020

Wadsworth first appeared as a census-designated place in the 2020 U.S. census.

=== 2020 census ===
Wadsworth CDP, Texas – Racial and ethnic composition Note: the US Census treats Hispanic/Latino as an ethnic category. This table excludes Latinos from the racial categories and assigns them to a separate category. Hispanics/Latinos may be of any race.
Race / Ethnicity (NH = Non-Hispanic)	Pop 2020	% 2020
White alone (NH)	238	78.81%
Black or African American alone (NH)	4	1.32%
Native American or Alaska Native alone (NH)	0	0.00%
Asian alone (NH)	3	0.99%
Native Hawaiian or Pacific Islander alone (NH)	0	0.00%
Other race alone (NH)	0	0.00%
Mixed race or Multiracial (NH)	4	1.32%
Hispanic or Latino (any race)	53	17.55%
Total	302	100.00%

== Education ==
Public education in the community of Wadsworth is provided by the Bay City Independent School District. Included Bay City High School, higher education is available at the Wharton County Junior College in Bay City.

== Healthcare ==
Wadsworth and other municipalities in Matagorda County are served by the Matagorda Regional Medical Center.
