= Texas State Highway 60 =

State highway in Texas

State Highway 60

Route information
- Maintained by TxDOT
- Length: 69.949 mi (112.572 km)
- Existed: 1923–present

Major junctions
- South end: FM 2031 at Matagorda
- Future I-69 / US 59 at Wharton US 90 Alt. at East Bernard
- North end: SH 36 at Wallis

Location
- Country: United States
- State: Texas

Highway system
- Highways in Texas; Interstate; US; State; Former; Toll; Loops; Spurs; FM/RM; Park; Rec
← US 60	→ SH 61

State Highway 60 (SH 60) is a state route running from Wallis to Matagorda, Texas. The route was designated on August 21, 1923, from Wharton to Matagorda, previously numbered SH 12C. On June 8, 1925, SH 60 was extended north to East Bernard. On July 27, 1925, SH 60 was extended north to Wallis. On December 17, 1929, the section from East Bernard to Wallis was to be cancelled when resurfacing on this section is done. On December 12, 1931, the section from East Bernard to Wallis was cancelled as resurfacing was completed. On May 27, 1932, the section from Wallis to East Bernard was to be restored when right-of-way was acquired. On April 10, 1934, that section was restored, as right-of-way was acquired.

== Junction list ==
County	Location	mi	km	Destinations	Notes
Matagorda	Matagorda	0.0	0.0	FM 2031	Southern terminus of SH 60
Matagorda		9.1	14.6	FM 521	South end of FM 521 concurrency
Matagorda	Wadsworth	10.2	16.4	FM 2078 west	Eastern terminus of FM 2078
Matagorda	Wadsworth	10.5	16.9	FM 521 – Brazoria	North end of FM 521 concurrency
Matagorda		18.1	29.1	FM 2668 – Bay City	
Matagorda	Bay City	21.1	34.0	SH 35 – Blessing, West Columbia	
Wharton	Lane City	37.8	60.8	FM 442 east – Needville	Western terminus of FM 442
Wharton		41.5	66.8	FM 1299 north – Wharton	Southern terminus of FM 1299
Wharton	Wharton	44.9	72.3	FM 3012 east	Western terminus of FM 3012
Wharton	Wharton	45.4	73.1	FM 1299 south	Northern terminus of FM 1299
Wharton	Wharton	46.2	74.4	I-69 BL / Bus. US 59	South end of Bus. I-69/Bus. US 59 concurrency
Wharton	Wharton	46.9	75.5	FM 102 north – Glen Flora, Eagle Lake	Southern terminus of FM 102
Wharton	Wharton	47.3	76.1	FM 1301 east – Boling	Western terminus of FM 1301
Wharton	Wharton	50.3	81.0	Future I-69 / US 59 – El Campo, Rosenberg, Houston	I-69/US 59 exit 70.
Wharton	Hungerford	52.3	84.2	FM 1161 – Spanish Camp	
Wharton	Hungerford	52.6	84.7	I-69 BL / Bus. US 59	North end of Bus. I-69/Bus. US 59 concurrency
Wharton	East Bernard	60.4	97.2	FM 2919 east – Kendleton	Western terminus of FM 2919
Wharton	East Bernard	61.3	98.7	FM 1164 west – Nottawa	Eastern terminus of FM 1164
Wharton	East Bernard	62.2	100.1	US 90 Alt. – Eagle Lake, Rosenberg	
Austin	Wallis	69.9	112.5	SH 36 – Sealy, Rosenberg	Northern terminus of SH 60
1.000 mi = 1.609 km; 1.000 km = 0.621 mi
