= LaBradford Smith =

American basketball player (born 1969)

Personal information
- Born: April 3, 1969 (age 57) Bay City, Texas, U.S.
- Listed height: 6 ft 3 in (1.91 m)
- Listed weight: 200 lb (91 kg)

Career information
- High school: Bay City (Bay City, Texas)
- College: Louisville (1987–1991)
- NBA draft: 1991: 1st round, 19th overall pick
- Drafted by: Washington Bullets
- Playing career: 1991–2000
- Position: Shooting guard
- Number: 22, 15

Career history
- 1991–1993: Washington Bullets
- 1993–1994: Sacramento Kings
- 1994: Rapid City Thrillers
- 1994–1996: Quad City Thunder
- 1996–1997: León Caja España
- 1997–1998: MKS Znicz Basket Pruszków
- 1998–1999: Śląsk Wrocław
- 1999–2000: Baltimore Bayrunners

Career highlights
- First-team All-Metro Conference (1990); Gatorade National Player of the Year (1987); 2× First-team Parade All-American (1986, 1987); Co-Texas Mr. Basketball (1987); McDonald's All-American (1987)

Career NBA statistics
- Points: 1,218 (6.7 ppg)
- Rebounds: 271 (1.5 rpg)
- Assists: 394 (2.2 apg)
- Stats at NBA.com
- Stats at Basketball Reference
Medals
Men's basketball
Representing United States
FIBA U19 World Championship
Silver medal – second place	1987 Bormio	Team competition

LaBradford Corvey Smith (born April 3, 1969) is an American former professional basketball player.

== Career ==
Smith went to Bay City High School in Bay City, Texas. He played collegiately at the University of Louisville before being selected by the Washington Bullets in the 1st round (19th overall) of the 1991 NBA draft.

Smith played in three NBA seasons from 1991 to 1994. His best year as a pro came during the 1992–93 season as a member of the Bullets, when he appeared in 69 games and averaged 9.3 ppg. During the 1993–94 season, he was waived by the Bullets and spent the rest of the season playing for the Sacramento Kings. He later on played in the CBA and overseas in Europe.

Smith is known for scoring 37 points on Michael Jordan in a road game against the Chicago Bulls on March 19, 1993. He shot 15–20 from the floor, and 7–7 from the foul line. However, the Bullets lost 104–99. Jordan claimed Smith had the audacity to say "Nice game, Mike" after the game. The following day the teams played again in Washington D.C. Jordan proceeded to score 36 points in the first half as retribution for the alleged slight from the previous day. It turns out “Nice game, Mike” was never actually said, but was a made up story by Michael Jordan to motivate himself to perform better against Smith.
