= Bay City Regional Airport =

Airport in Texas, United States

- IATA: BBC; ICAO: KBYY; FAA LID: BYY

Summary
- Airport type: Public
- Owner: City of Bay City
- Serves: Bay City, Texas
- Elevation AMSL: 45 ft (14 m)
- Coordinates: 28°58′24″N 095°51′49″W

Map
- Location within Texas

Runways
Direction	Length		Surface
Direction	ft	m	Surface
13/31	5,107	1,557	Asphalt

Statistics (2023)
- Aircraft operations (year ending 4/16/2023): 14,150
- Based aircraft: 31
- Source: Federal Aviation Administration

Bay City Regional Airport (IATA: BBC, ICAO: KBYY, FAA LID: BYY) is a city-owned public-use airport located five nautical miles (9 km) east of the central business district of Bay City, in Matagorda County, Texas, United States.

Although most U.S. airports use the same three-letter location identifier for the FAA and IATA, this airport is assigned BYY by the FAA and BBC by the IATA.

== Facilities and aircraft ==
Bay City Regional Airport covers an area of 141 acres (57 ha) at an elevation of 45 feet (14 m) above mean sea level. It has one runway designated 13/31 with a 5,107 by 75 ft (1,557 x 23 m) asphalt surface.

For the 12-month period ending April 16, 2023, the airport had 14,150 aircraft operations, an average of 39 per day: 98% general aviation and 1% military. At that time there were 31 aircraft based at this airport: 24 single-engine, 2 multi-engine, 3 helicopter and 2 ultralight.

== See also ==
- List of airports in Texas
