= Bay City, Texas =

- City
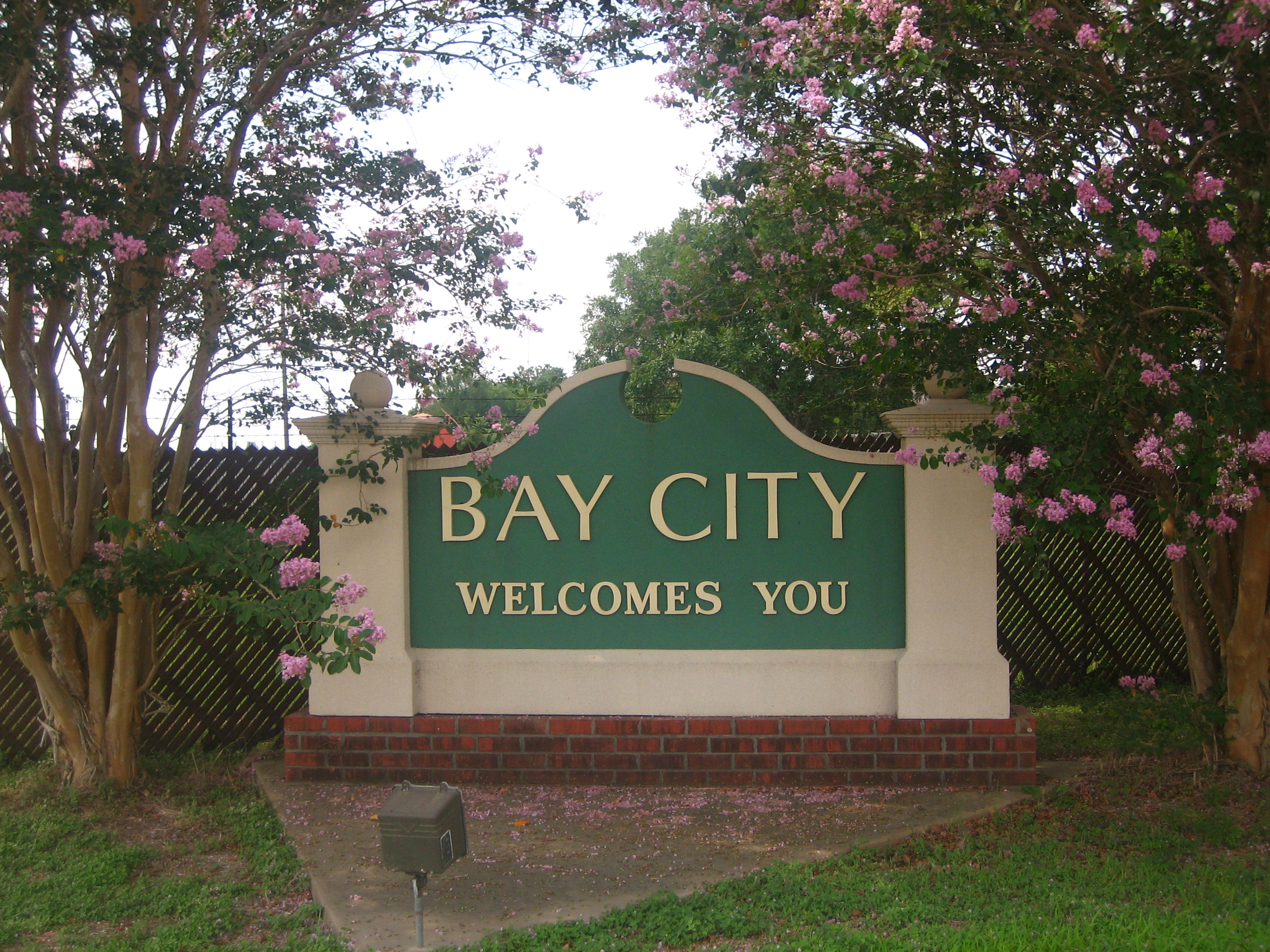
- Entrance sign to Bay City
- Interactive map of Bay City, Texas
- Location within Texas Location within the United States Location within North America
- Coordinates: 28°59′02″N 95°57′36″W
- Country: United States
- State: Texas
- County: Matagorda

Government
  - Type: Mayor-council government
  - Mayor: Robert Nelson
  - City Council: Benjamin Flores; Jim Folse; Brad Westmoreland; Becca Sitz; Blayne Finlay

Area
  - Total: 9.29 sq mi (24.07 km^{2})
  - Land: 9.27 sq mi (24.00 km^{2})
  - Water: 0.023 sq mi (0.06 km^{2})
- Elevation: 49 ft (15 m)

Population (2020)
  - Total: 18,061
  - Density: 1,892.0/sq mi (730.52/km^{2})
- Time zone: UTC-6 (Central (CST))
  - Summer (DST): UTC-5 (CDT)
- ZIP Codes: 77404, 77414
- Area code: 979
- FIPS code: 48-05984
- GNIS feature ID: 2409798
- Website: www.baycitytx.gov

Bay City is a city and the county seat of Matagorda County, Texas, United States. The population was 17,614 at the 2010 census and 18,061 at the 2020 census.

== History ==
Bay City was incorporated in 1894 as the county seat, as it was in the center of Matagorda County. The Bay City Town Company was founded by David Swickheimer in partnership with G. M. Magill, N. M. Vogelsang, and Nicholas King.

== Geography ==
According to the United States Census Bureau, the city has a total area of 8.5 square miles (22.0 km^{2}), of which 8.5 square miles (22.0 km^{2}) is land and 0.12% is covered by water.

Bay City was formerly named "Bay Prairie", as the natural ecosystems that surround the town are prairies crisscrossed by creeks that lead into the bay.

=== Climate ===
The climate in this area is characterized by hot, humid summers and generally mild to cool winters. According to the Köppen Climate Classification system, Bay City has a humid subtropical climate, abbreviated "Cfa" on climate maps.

Climate data for Bay City Waterworks (normals 1991–2020, extremes 1912–1917, 1942–present)
Month	Jan	Feb	Mar	Apr	May	Jun	Jul	Aug	Sep	Oct	Nov	Dec	Year
Record high °F (°C)	86 (30)	90 (32)	91 (33)	94 (34)	98 (37)	106 (41)	107 (42)	107 (42)	109 (43)	97 (36)	97 (36)	88 (31)	109 (43)
Mean maximum °F (°C)	77.1 (25.1)	79.2 (26.2)	82.5 (28.1)	87.1 (30.6)	90.7 (32.6)	95.3 (35.2)	95.9 (35.5)	97.7 (36.5)	95.1 (35.1)	91.0 (32.8)	84.2 (29.0)	79.1 (26.2)	98.9 (37.2)
Mean daily maximum °F (°C)	63.2 (17.3)	66.6 (19.2)	72.2 (22.3)	77.6 (25.3)	83.5 (28.6)	88.8 (31.6)	90.6 (32.6)	91.4 (33.0)	88.1 (31.2)	81.4 (27.4)	72.2 (22.3)	65.3 (18.5)	78.4 (25.8)
Daily mean °F (°C)	53.0 (11.7)	56.9 (13.8)	62.5 (16.9)	68.3 (20.2)	74.8 (23.8)	80.1 (26.7)	81.7 (27.6)	82.1 (27.8)	78.3 (25.7)	70.9 (21.6)	61.8 (16.6)	55.2 (12.9)	68.8 (20.4)
Mean daily minimum °F (°C)	42.7 (5.9)	47.1 (8.4)	52.9 (11.6)	58.9 (14.9)	66.1 (18.9)	71.5 (21.9)	72.8 (22.7)	72.8 (22.7)	68.6 (20.3)	60.3 (15.7)	51.4 (10.8)	45.1 (7.3)	59.2 (15.1)
Mean minimum °F (°C)	28.6 (−1.9)	33.0 (0.6)	35.7 (2.1)	44.3 (6.8)	54.8 (12.7)	66.1 (18.9)	70.6 (21.4)	69.8 (21.0)	59.4 (15.2)	44.3 (6.8)	34.9 (1.6)	30.1 (−1.1)	26.3 (−3.2)
Record low °F (°C)	11 (−12)	10 (−12)	22 (−6)	34 (1)	39 (4)	57 (14)	61 (16)	59 (15)	46 (8)	29 (−2)	24 (−4)	7 (−14)	7 (−14)
Average precipitation inches (mm)	3.76 (96)	2.53 (64)	3.03 (77)	3.24 (82)	4.44 (113)	5.69 (145)	4.51 (115)	4.27 (108)	5.79 (147)	4.24 (108)	4.00 (102)	3.56 (90)	49.06 (1,247)
Average snowfall inches (cm)	0.0 (0.0)	0.0 (0.0)	0.0 (0.0)	0.0 (0.0)	0.0 (0.0)	0.0 (0.0)	0.0 (0.0)	0.0 (0.0)	0.0 (0.0)	0.0 (0.0)	0.0 (0.0)	0.0 (0.0)	0 (0)
Average precipitation days (≥ 0.1 in)	5.5	4.0	4.2	3.4	4.8	6.0	5.6	5.8	6.5	5.2	4.8	5.8	61.6
Average snowy days (≥ 0.1)	0.0	0.0	0.0	0.0	0.0	0.0	0.0	0.0	0.0	0.0	0.0	0.0	0
Source: NOAA

== Demographics ==
Historical population
Census	Pop.	Note	%±
1910	3,156		—
1920	3,454		9.4%
1930	4,070		17.8%
1940	6,594		62.0%
1950	9,427		43.0%
1960	11,656		23.6%
1970	13,445		15.3%
1980	17,837		32.7%
1990	18,170		1.9%
2000	18,667		2.7%
2010	17,614		−5.6%
2020	18,061		2.5%
U.S. Census Bureau

As of the 2020 census, Bay City had a population of 18,061, 6,660 households, and 4,086 families residing in the city. The median age was 34.7 years, with 27.3% of residents under the age of 18 and 15.0% 65 years of age or older. For every 100 females there were 94.6 males, and among residents age 18 and over there were 90.6 males for every 100 females.

99.3% of residents lived in urban areas, while 0.7% lived in rural areas.

There were 6,660 households in Bay City, of which 35.5% had children under the age of 18 living in them. Of all households, 43.3% were married-couple households, 19.1% were households with a male householder and no spouse or partner present, and 31.5% were households with a female householder and no spouse or partner present. About 27.6% of all households were made up of individuals and 11.0% had someone living alone who was 65 years of age or older.

There were 8,165 housing units, of which 18.4% were vacant. Among occupied housing units, 54.5% were owner-occupied and 45.5% were renter-occupied. The homeowner vacancy rate was 1.8% and the rental vacancy rate was 19.0%.

Racial composition as of the 2020 census
Race	Percent
White	45.8%
Black or African American	16.2%
American Indian and Alaska Native	0.9%
Asian	1.0%
Native Hawaiian and Other Pacific Islander	<0.1%
Some other race	20.4%
Two or more races	15.7%
Hispanic or Latino (of any race)	48.7%

(Note: Note: the US Census treats Hispanic/Latino as an ethnic category. This table excludes Latinos from the racial categories and assigns them to a separate category. Hispanics/Latinos can be of any race.)

=== 2000 census ===
As of the 2000 census, 18,667 people, 6,912 households, and 4,769 families resided in the city. The population density was 2,196.0 inhabitants per square mile (847.9/km^{2}). There were 8,113 housing units at an average density of 954.4 per square mile (368.5/km^{2}). The racial makeup of the city was 61.62% White, 17.26% African American, 0.74% Native American, 0.88% Asian, 0.07% Pacific Islander, 16.84% from other races, and 2.59% from two or more races. Hispanics or Latinos of any race were 34.74% of the population.

Of the 6,912 households, 37.9% had children under the age of 18 living with them, 49.0% were married couples living together, 16.1% had a female householder with no husband present, and 31.0% were not families. About 27.1% of all households were made up of individuals, and 10.5% had someone living alone who was 65 years of age or older. The average household size was 2.66 and the average family size was 3.25.

In the city, the population was distributed as 30.9% under the age of 18, 9.8% from 18 to 24, 28.2% from 25 to 44, 20.0% from 45 to 64, and 11.1% who were 65 years of age or older. The median age was 32 years. For every 100 females, there were 95.0 males. For every 100 females age 18 and over, there were 91.1 males.

The median income for a household in the city was $30,446, and for a family was $39,281. Males had a median income of $38,202 versus $23,058 for females. The per capita income for the city was $15,284. About 18.3% of families and 21.4% of the population were below the poverty line, including 27.7% of those under age 18 and 14.3% of those age 65 or over. Minorities make up the largest ethnic portion of Bay City, Texas.

== Economy ==
In 2017, Bay City became the site of a new $1.8-billion Tenaris seamless-pipe mill, making tubular goods, such as drill pipe and casing, for the oil-drilling industry.

Bay City formerly housed the headquarters of Stanley Stores. The chain made several donations to the Bay City Museum.

=== Attractions ===
Bay City is home to the Matagorda County Birding Nature Center, a 35-acre (140,000 m^{2}) expanse of gardens and wildlife along the Colorado River of Texas.

Other attractions include the Matagorda County Museum, Market Days every third Saturday, and a variety of small shops and boutiques downtown. The Bay City Art League, also located here, has recently undergone major renovations and is currently working to revitalize the art scene in Matagorda County. In addition, the Bay City Community Theatre group (CAST) regularly produces shows at various local venues.

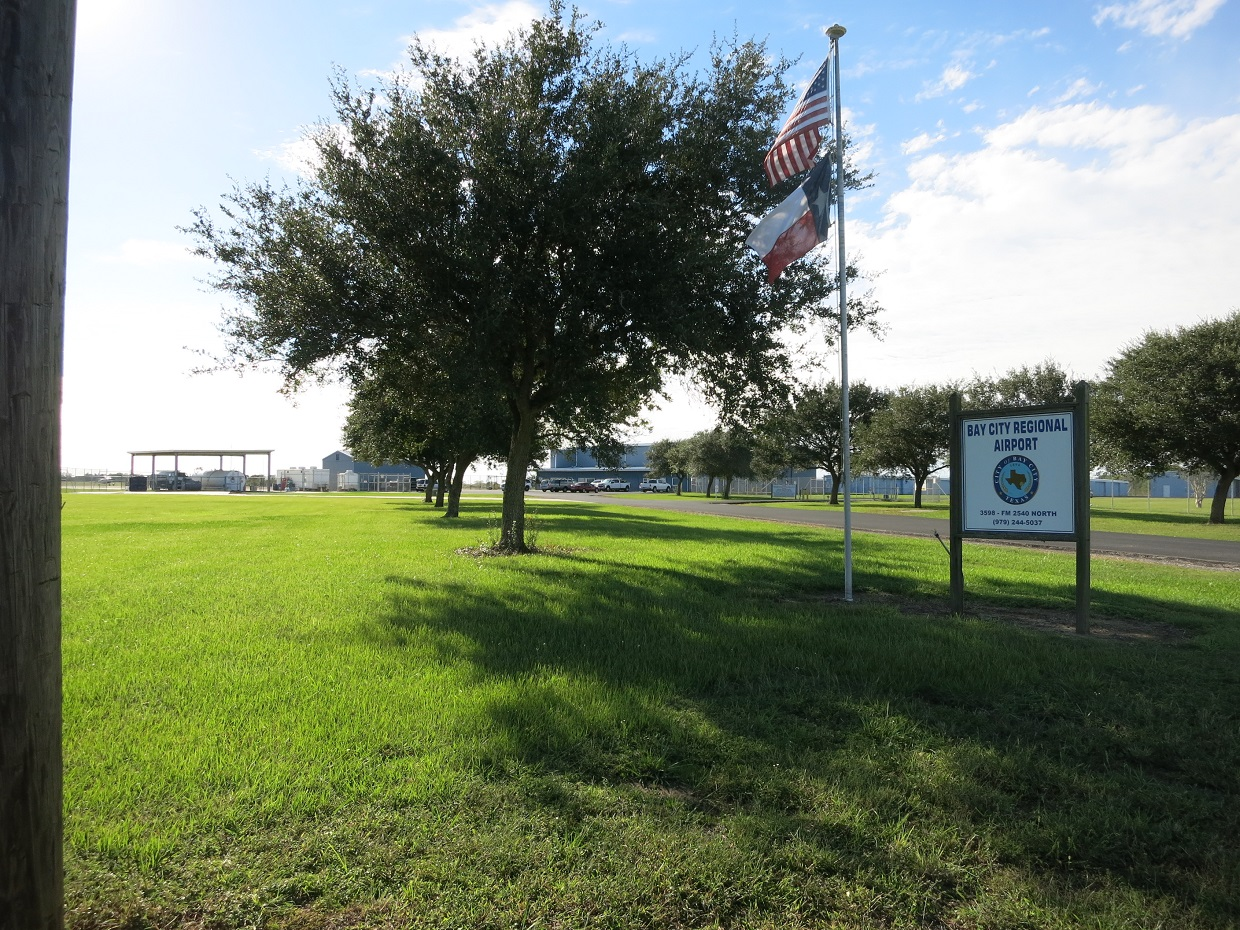
Bay City Regional Airport

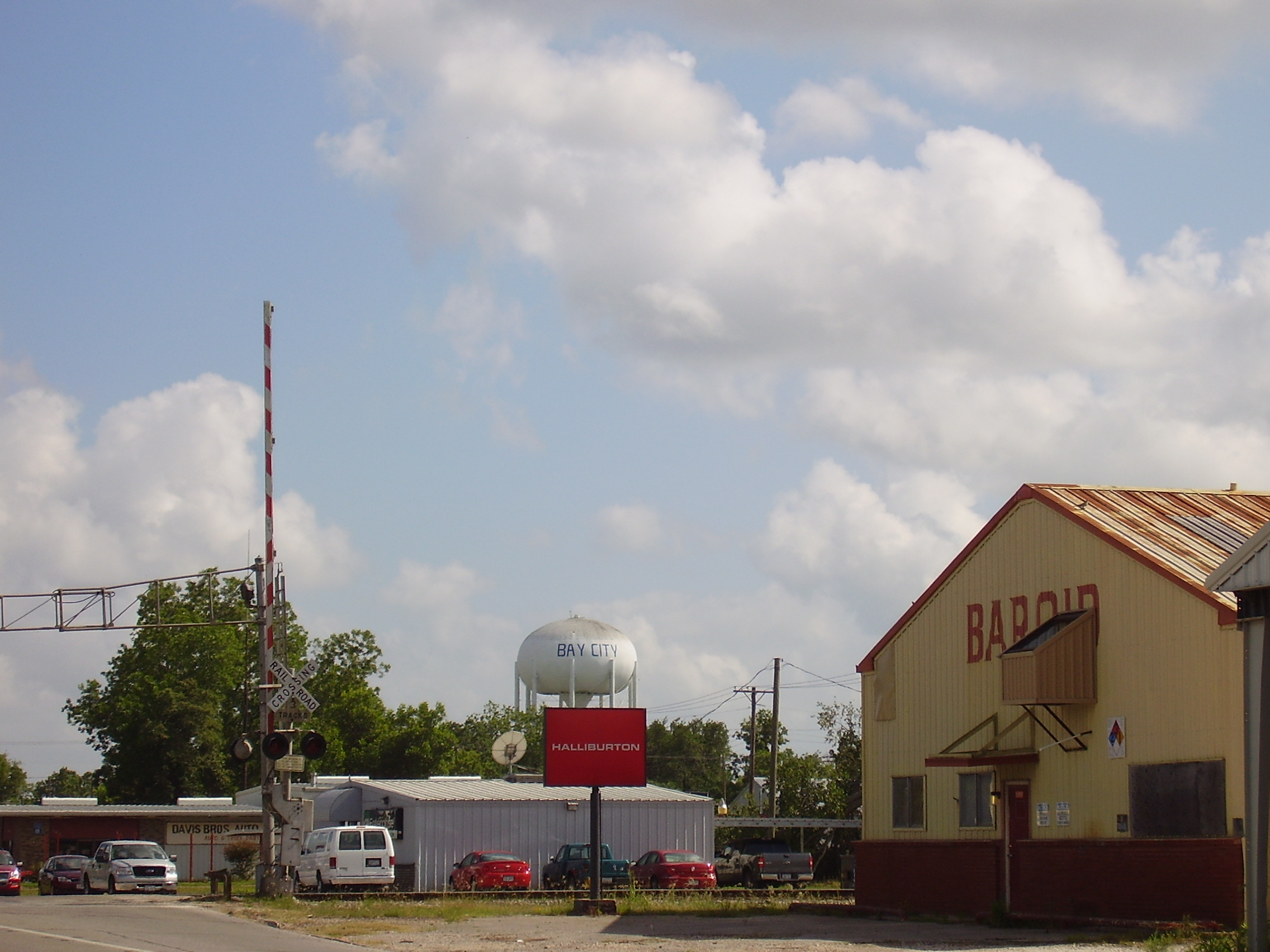
Businesses in Bay City

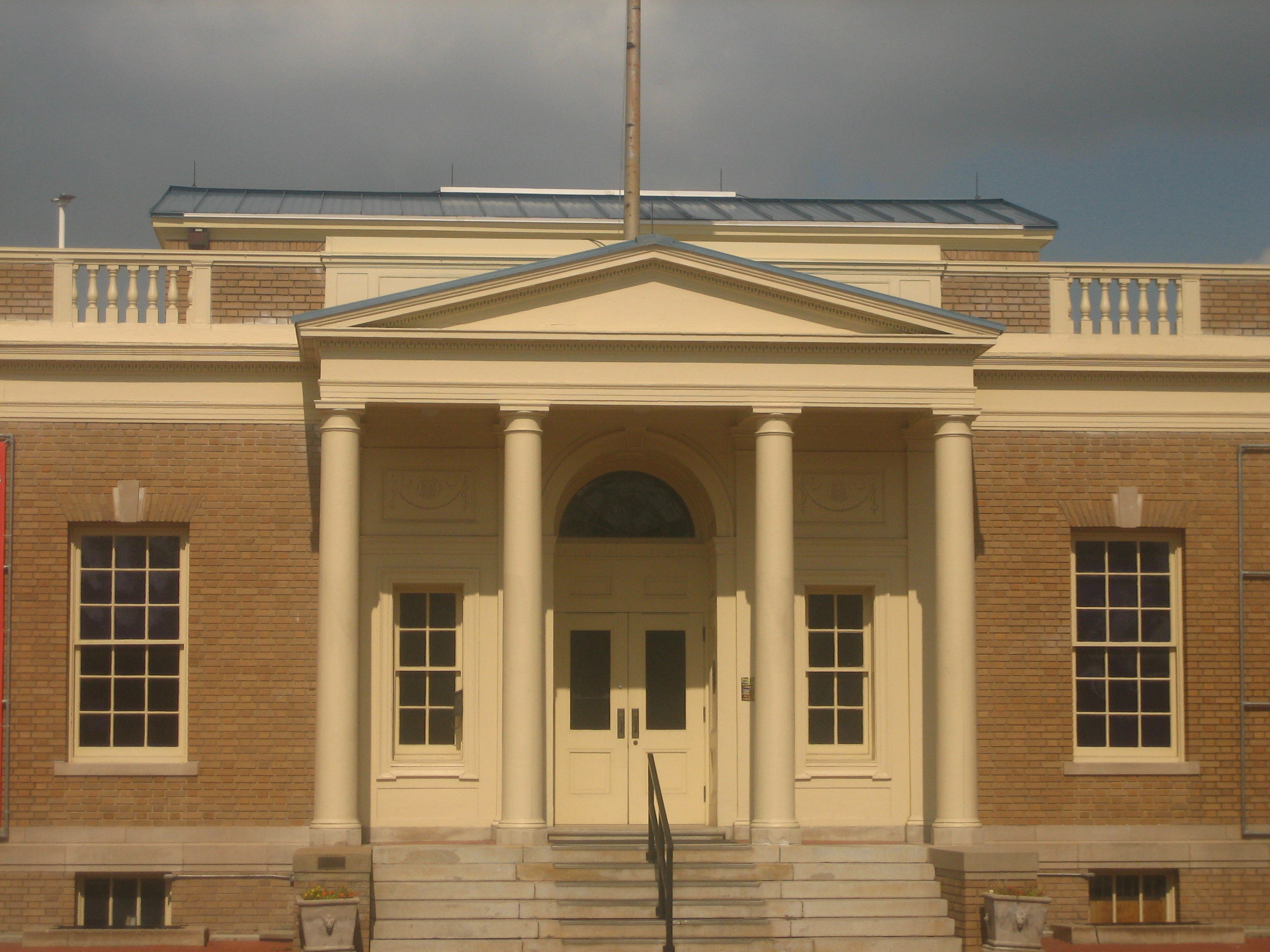
Matagorda County Museum

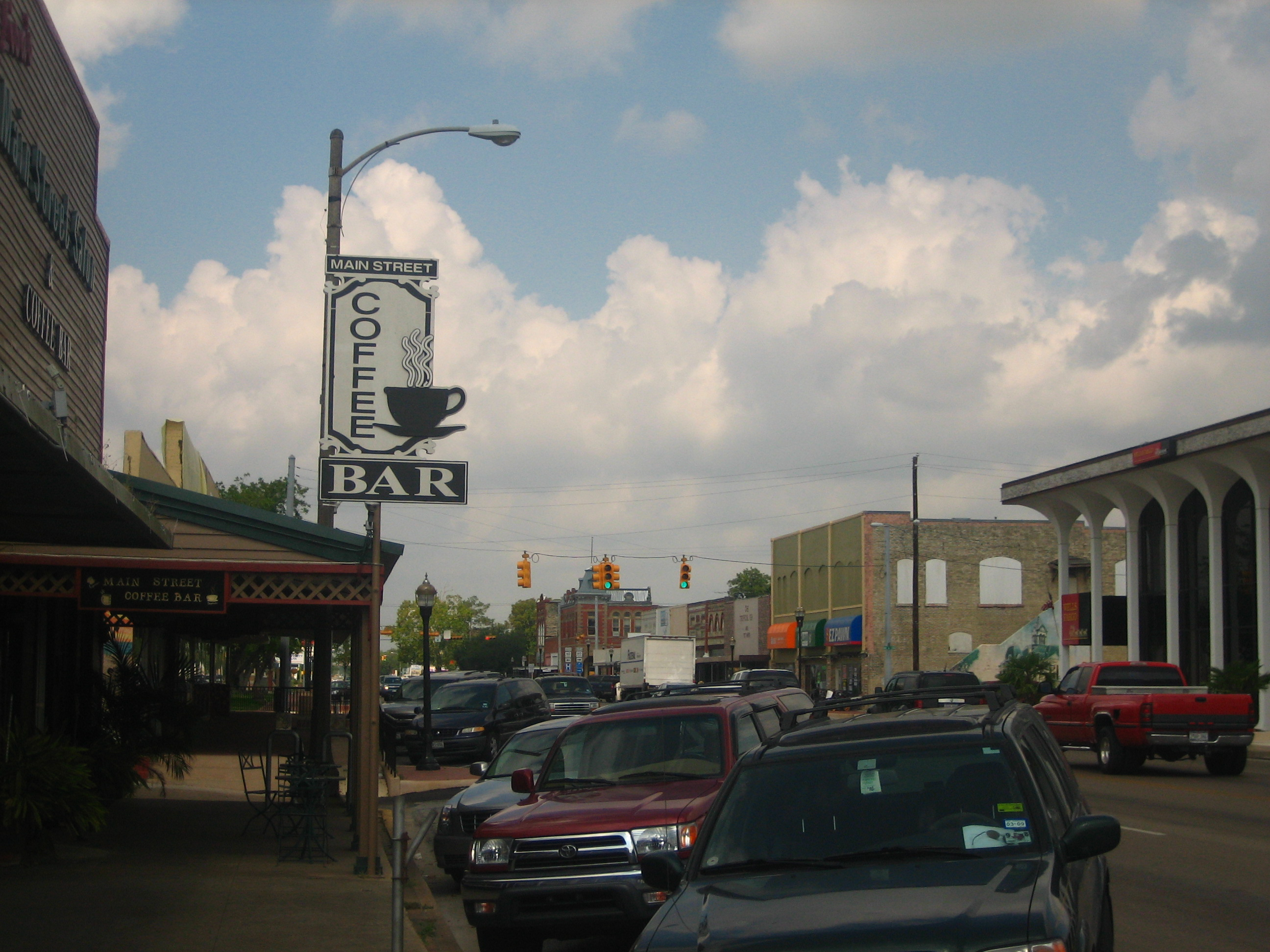
Downtown Bay City

== Education ==
Bay City is served by the Bay City Independent School District, consisting of elementary, intermediate, junior high, and high schools (including Bay City High School). The district previously operated seven schools until grade levels were condensed. It is now operating five schools and is led by superintendent Dr. Marshall Scott III.

The designated community college for Bay City ISD is Wharton County Junior College. It has a campus in Bay City, focusing on technical training and nuclear plant operations.

== Infrastructure ==
=== Transportation ===
==== Highways ====
- Texas State Highway 35
- Texas State Highway 60
- Farm to Market 2668

==== Rail ====
Bay City is located on the Union Pacific Railroad (UP) main line that roughly parallels the Texas Gulf Coast from Brownsville to Algoa, near Houston. The main line is shared by the BNSF Railway under trackage rights, and the BNSF operates a branch line from Bay City to Wadsworth.

As of 2024, the rail lines serving the city are used for freight haulage only; no passenger service is offered.

==== Air ====
Bay City Regional Airport is a city-owned public-use airport located five nautical miles (9 km) east of the central business district of Bay City.

=== Health care ===
Matagorda County is served by the Matagorda Regional Medical Center, and the mission-aligned Matagorda Medical Group. The Matagorda Episcopal Health Outreach Program (MEHOP), the county's only federally qualified health center, offers Family Medical, OB/Gyn, Pediatrics, Behavior Health, and Dentistry services. MEHOP accepts most insurances and assures that no patient will be denied or unable to access health care services due to an individual's inability to pay.

=== Government ===
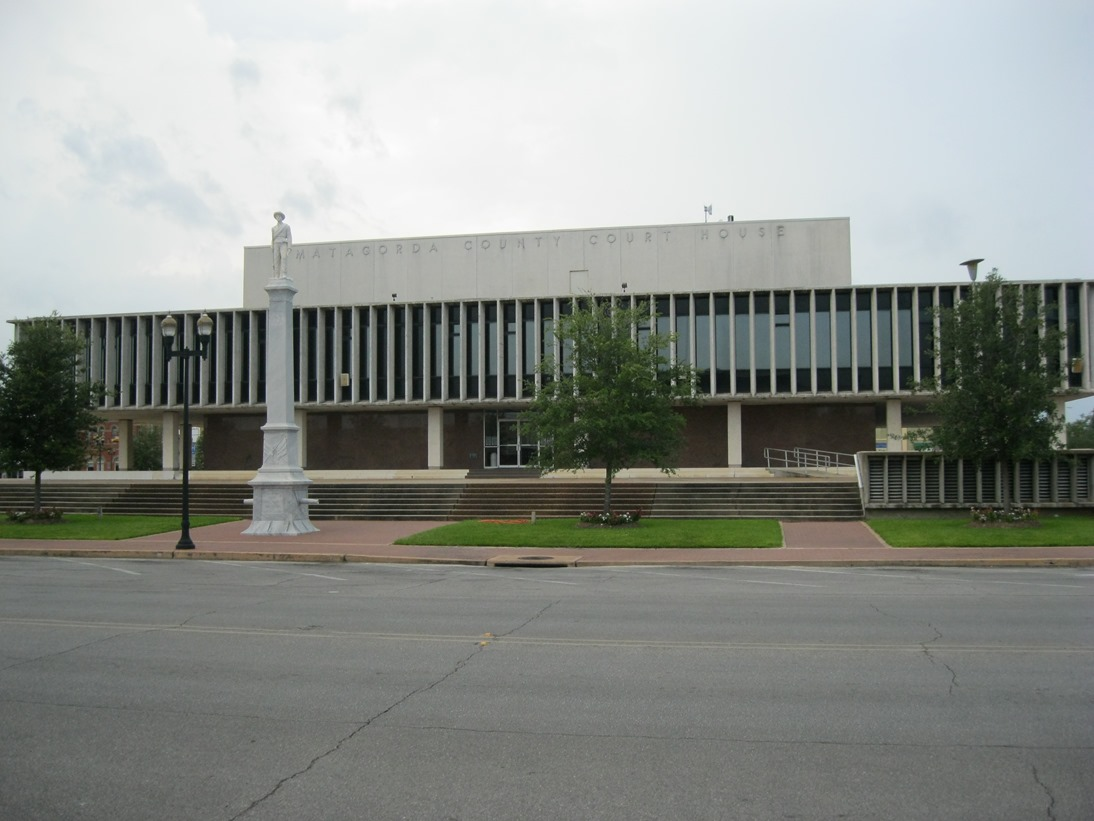
Courthouse from 6th Street

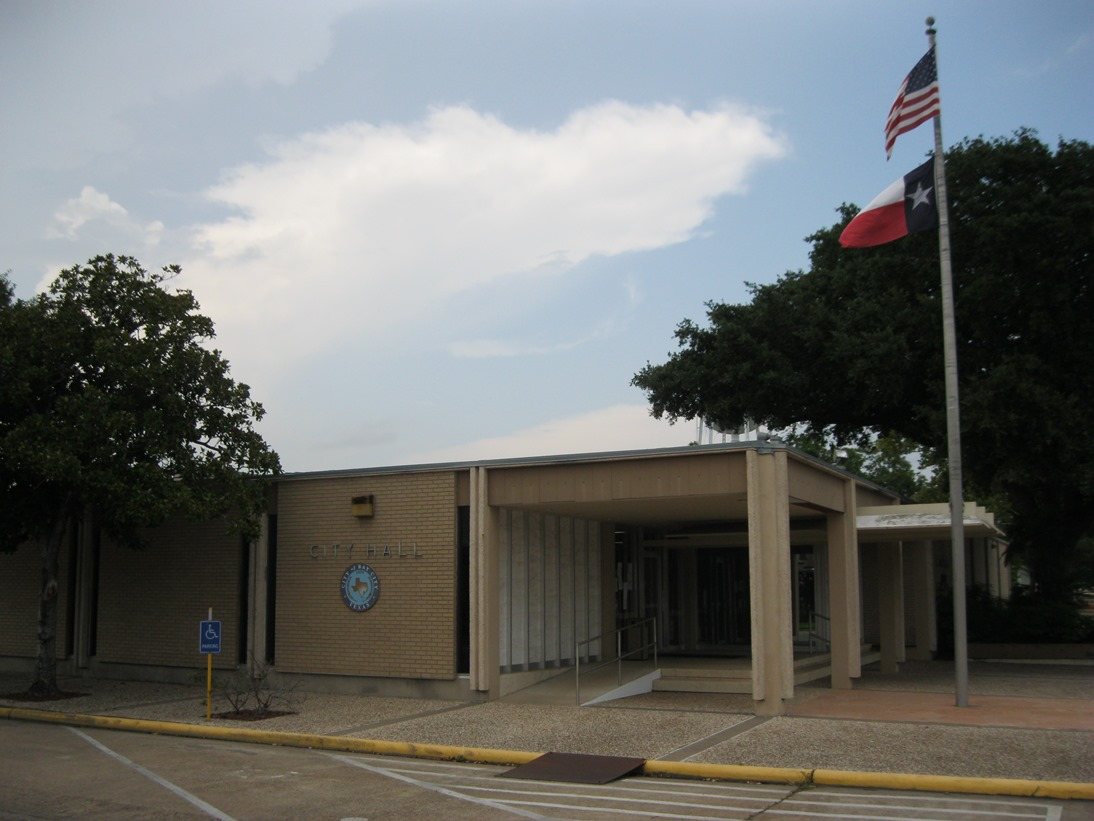
The City Hall on 5th Street

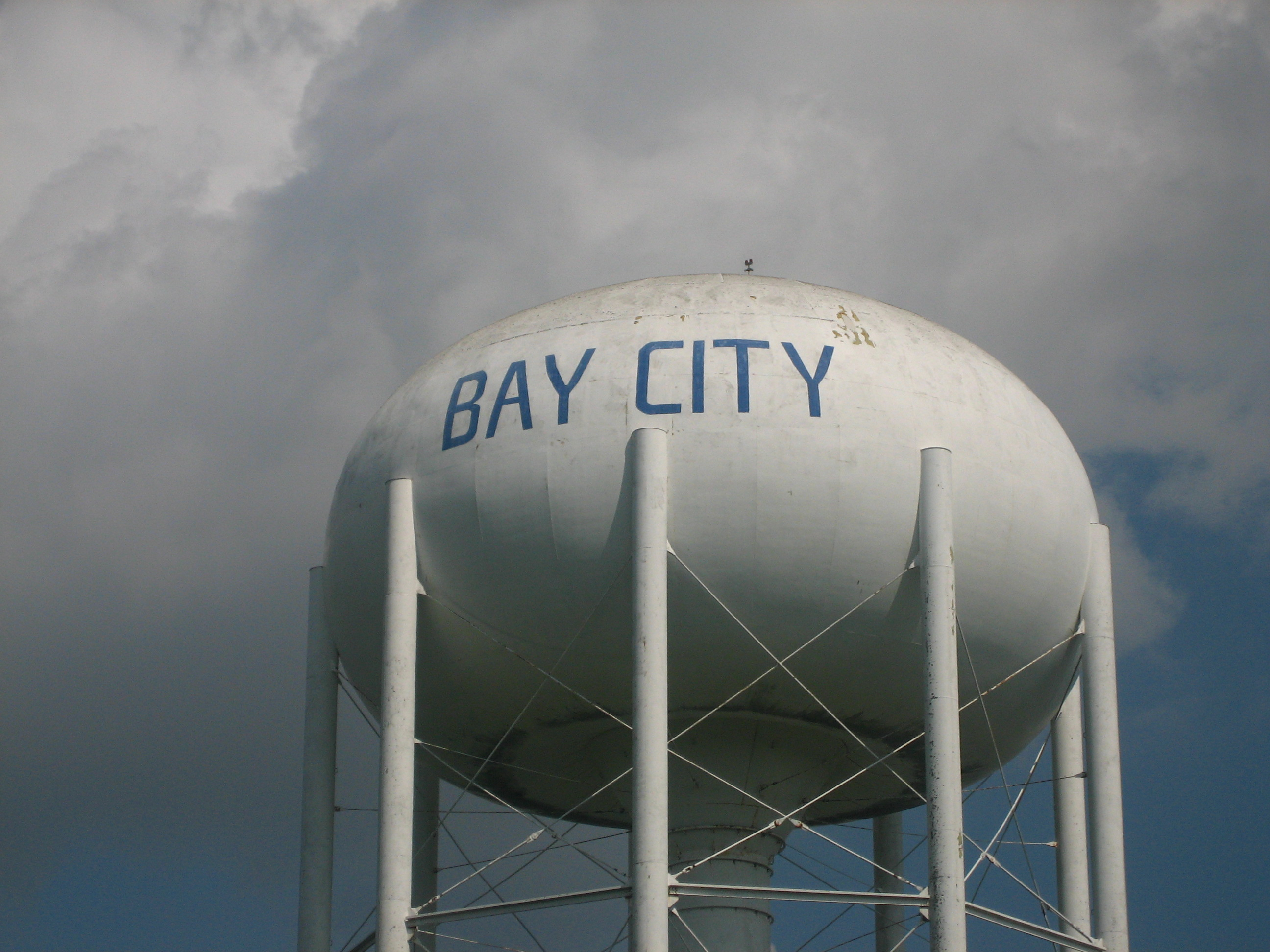
Bay City Water Tower

== Media ==
=== Radio ===
Hot Z100 (KHVZ) is an internet-based radio station broadcasting a Rhythmic Top 40 format, branded as "The Real Party Station". The station officially launched on December 5, 2020, and is owned by ZPR Media through Typical Media Group, in collaboration with a Black family-owned company.

== Notable people ==
- Charles Austin, Olympic gold medalist
- Forrest Bess, artist
- Robert Blackmon, professional football player
- David Caldwell, professional football player
- J. B. Cox, professional baseball player
- Joe DeLoach, Olympic gold medalist during the Seoul Olympics
- Mark Dennard, professional football player
- Alex Dixon, professional soccer player
- Hart Lee Dykes, professional football player
- Simon Fletcher, professional football player
- Ronnie Heard, professional football player
- Quentin Jammer, professional football player
- Chandi Jones, professional basketball player
- Greg Laughlin, U.S. Representatives from Texas's 14th district
- C. Wallis Ohl, Jr., retired Provisional Bishop of Fort Worth
- Ricardo Ramírez, Roman Catholic Bishop
- Tracy Simien, professional football player
- LaBradford Smith, professional basketball player
- That Mexican OT, Mexican-American Rapper
- Mal Whitfield, Olympic gold medalist
- Cedric Woodard, professional football player

== In popular culture ==
Part of the 1965 movie Baby the Rain Must Fall was filmed in Bay City.

== Churches ==
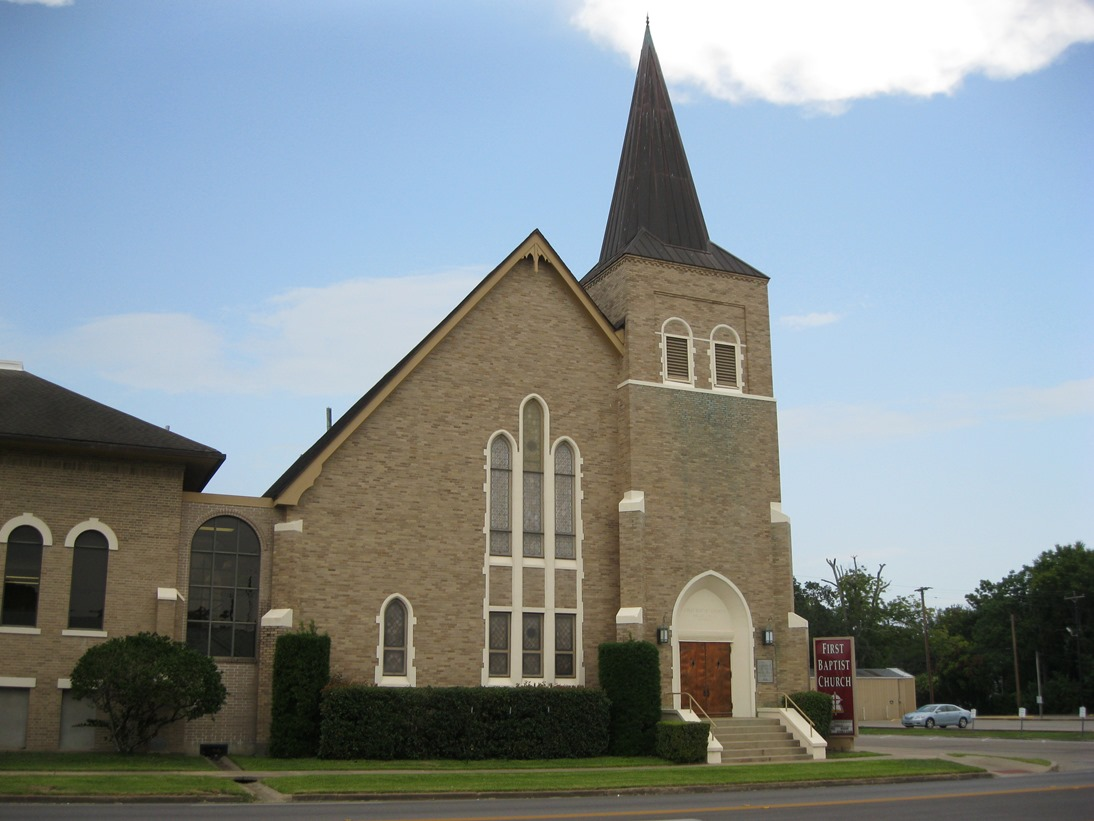
The First Baptist Church of Bay City dates to the 1850s. A hurricane destroyed the sanctuary in 1909. The current structure dates to 1947.

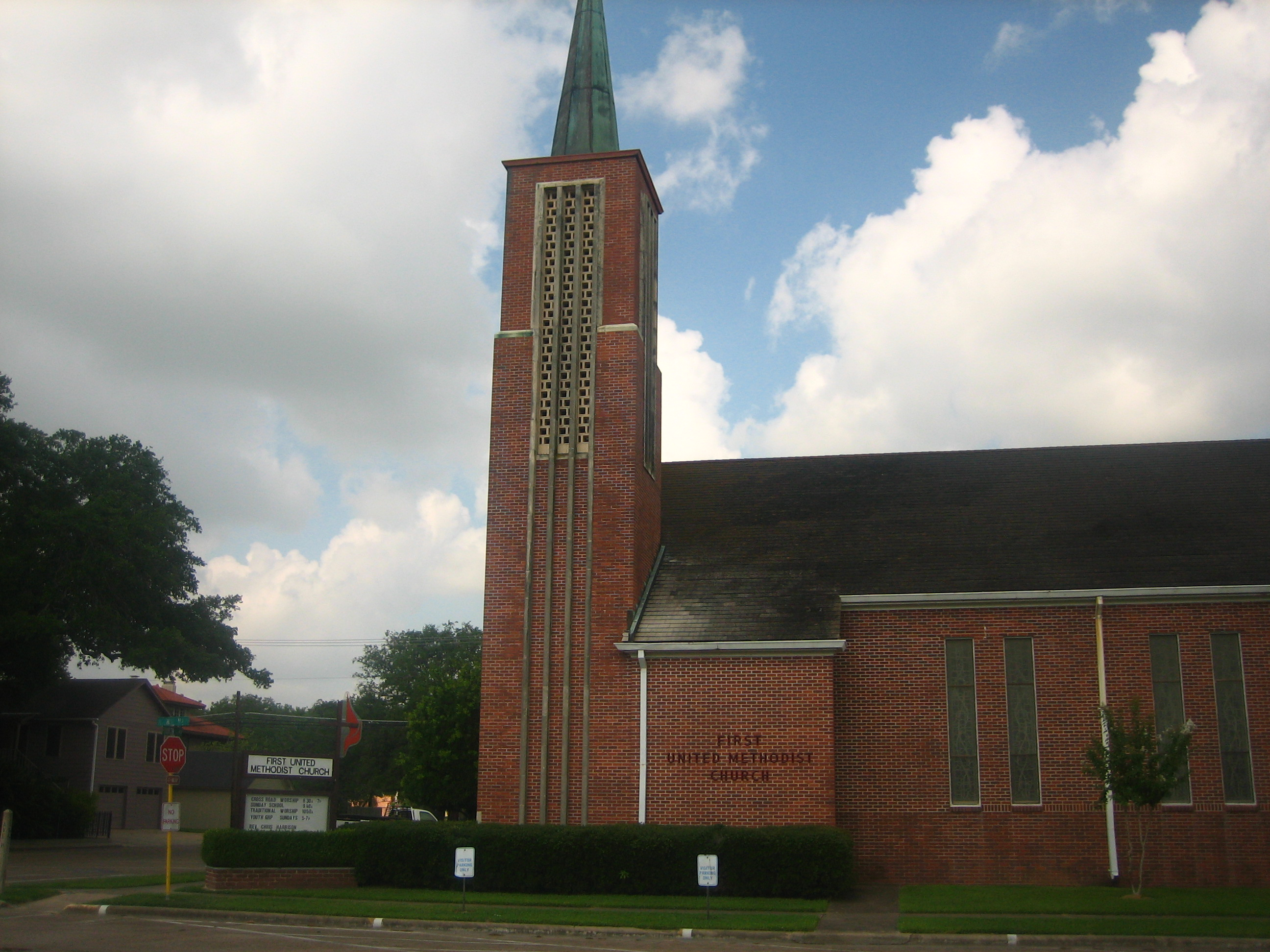
First United Methodist Church of Bay City dates to 1870.

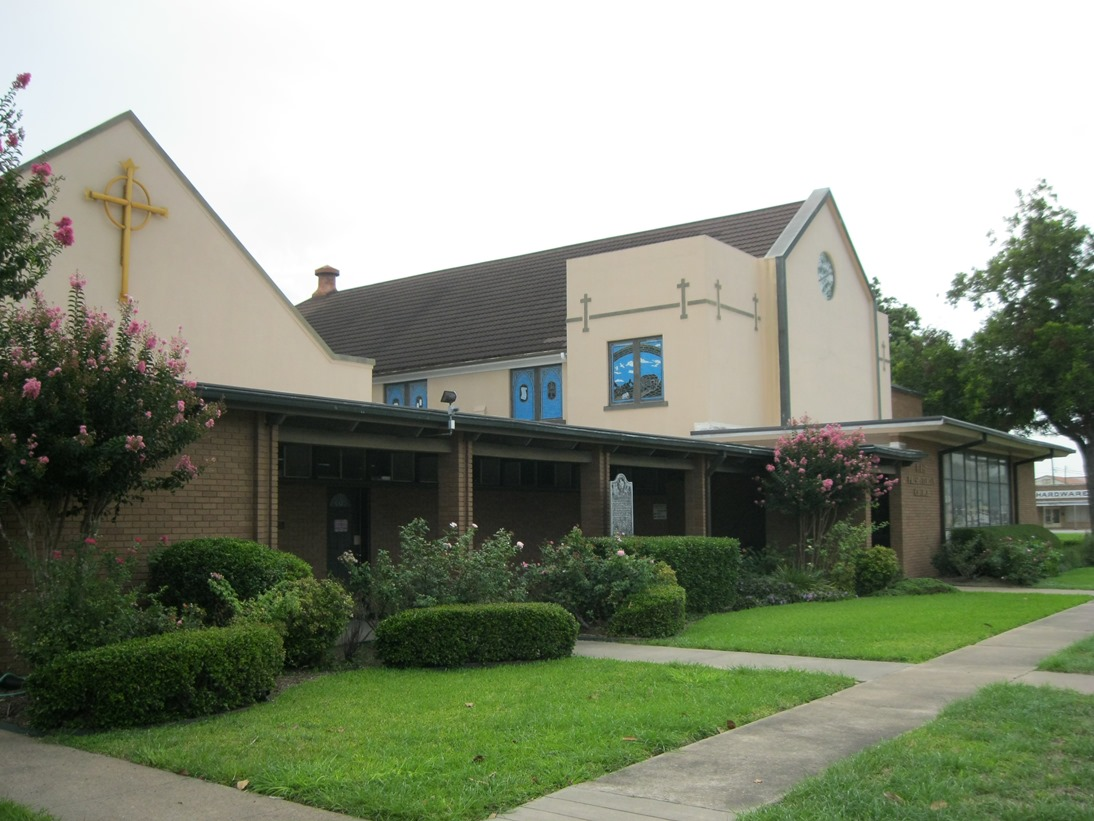
First Presbyterian Church of Bay City

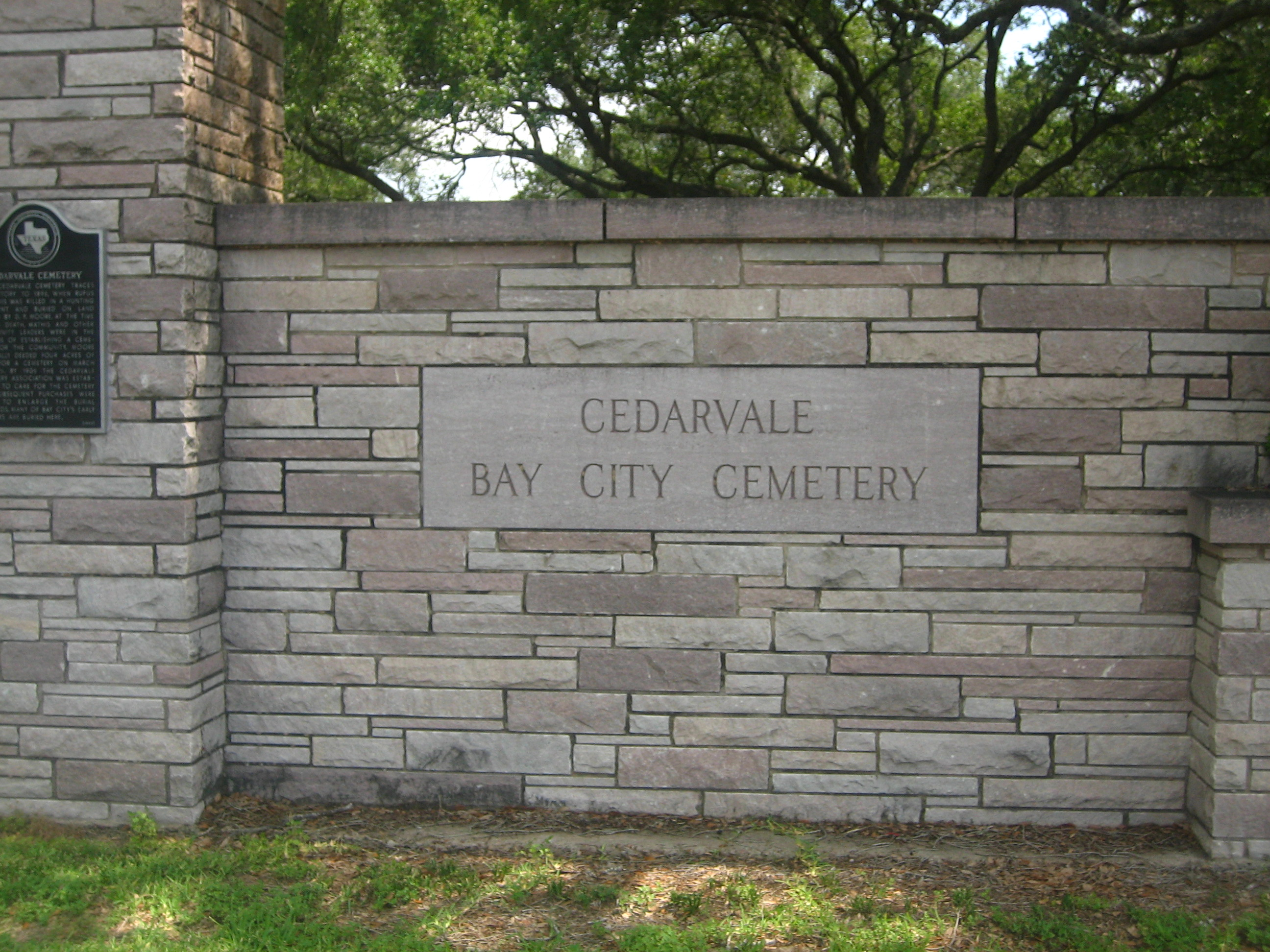
Entrance to Cedarvale Bay City Cemetery, which dates to 1896 with the burial of Rufus A. Mathis, an early Bay City pioneer
