= Spanish Camp, Texas =

- Unincorporated community
- Location within the state of Texas Spanish Camp, Texas (the United States)
- Coordinates: 29°23′44″N 96°10′0″W
- Country: United States
- State: Texas
- County: Wharton
- Elevation: 114 ft (35 m)
- Time zone: UTC−6 (Central (CST))
  - Summer (DST): UTC−5 (CDT)
- ZIP code: 77488
- Area code: 979
- GNIS: 1347623

Spanish Camp is an unincorporated community in north central Wharton County, in the U.S. state of Texas. The community is located between Egypt and Hungerford along Farm to Market Road 1161, (FM 1161) near its intersection with Farm to Market Road 640 (FM 640). After the Mexican army of Antonio López de Santa Anna camped at the site in 1836, the community took the name Spanish Camp. In 1870, a church in the community was founded by former slaves and the congregation still existed as of 2013.

== History ==
During the time when Stephen F. Austin and the Old Three Hundred were allowed to begin Anglo-American settlement, a community was established near the site. In 1836, during the Texas Revolution, Santa Ana's Mexican army bivouacked near a sulphur spring on Peach Creek. After this event, the settlement became known as Spanish Camp. There is a legend that the Mexican army buried their military payroll of gold coins in the panic that followed their defeat at the Battle of San Jacinto. Despite the notoriety, few people lived in Spanish Camp until after the Civil War. In 1870, ex-slave Hillary Hooks established the Camp Zion Baptist Church. Reverend Hooks' former owner, James E. Winston granted land to the church in 1887. A year later, part of the congregation broke away to form the Rising Star Baptist Church. This story is told on a state historical marker on FM 1161 to the northwest of the Camp Zion Cemetery.

Meanwhile, Spanish Camp got its own post office in 1877. About this time, Thomas Habermacher opened a cotton gin, a sawmill and a store in the community. By 1885, the settlement boasted a population of 50 with two churches, one gristmill, one school and two stores. Spanish Camp's population briefly climbed to 200 in 1890, but within a decade had fallen to 50 when the railroad bypassed the town. In 1905, the post office closed and the Camp Zion Cemetery was set up on land donated by the Duncan family. The Camp Zion Church building was used as a school and a refuge during floods. It was also the site of a Red Cross chapter in World War I. Wharton County's first producing oil well was drilled in 1925 near Iago in the Boling Field. This launched an oil drilling boom during which the Spanish Camp Field and others were exploited. In 1936, there were still homes and a factory in the area, but eleven years later there were only 20 persons and one business in Spanish Camp. In 1989, there were four businesses, three cemeteries, two churches and a number of homes in the community. The Spanish Camp Oil Field and several gravel pits were located nearby. In 1998, the Rising Star and Camp Zion Churches consolidated into one congregation, which included the descendants of former slaves.

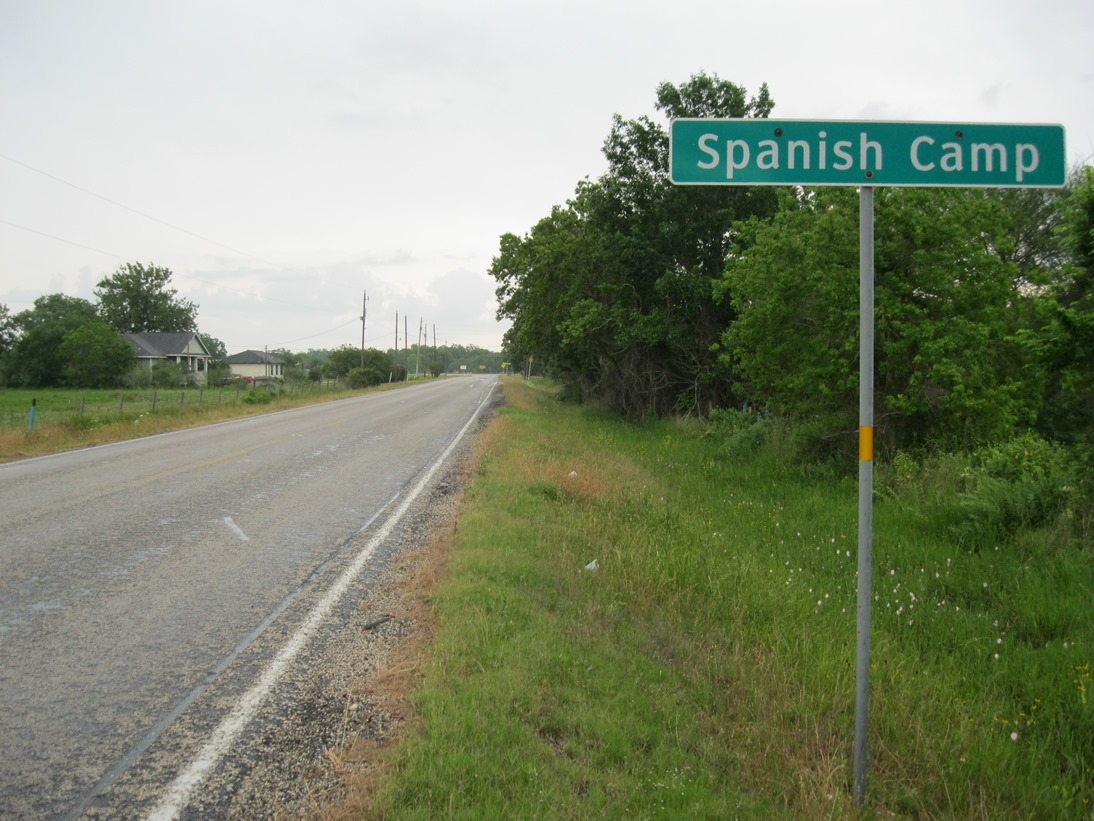
Spanish Camp sign is along FM 1161 going southeast toward the FM 640 intersection.

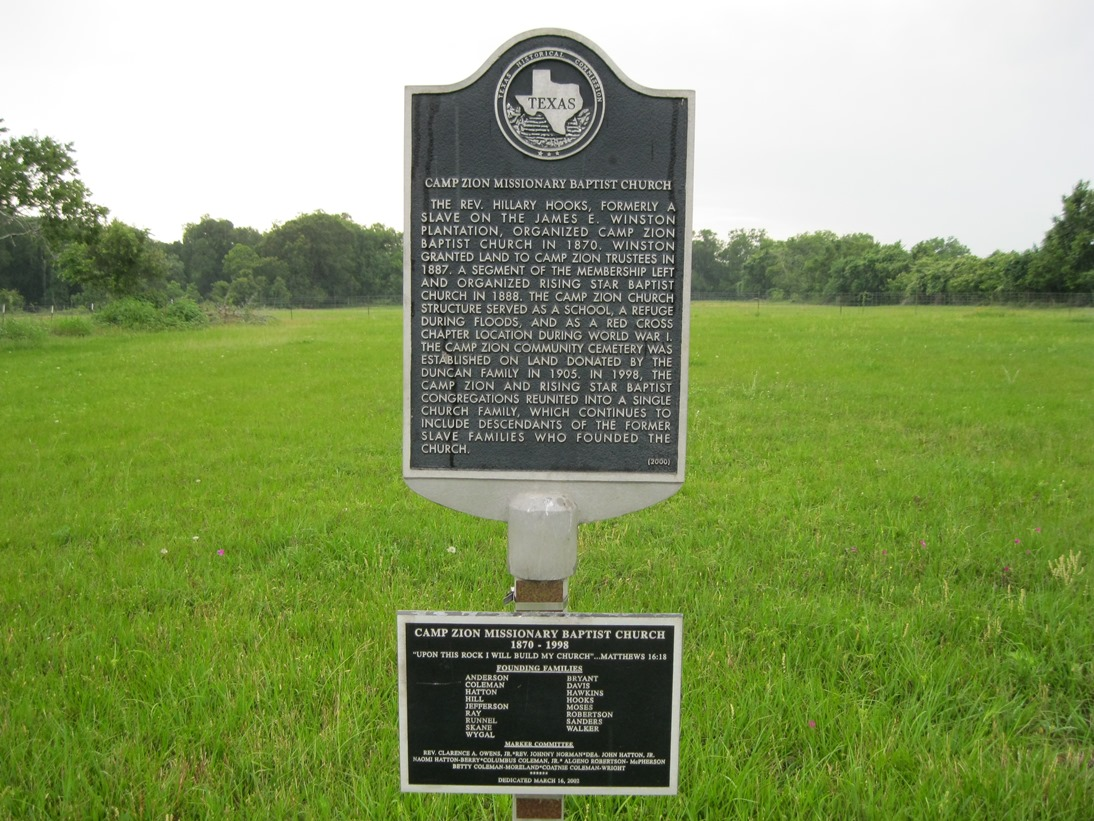
Camp Zion Baptist Church historical marker on FM 1161 is to the northwest of Camp Zion Cemetery. The church no longer exists at the site.

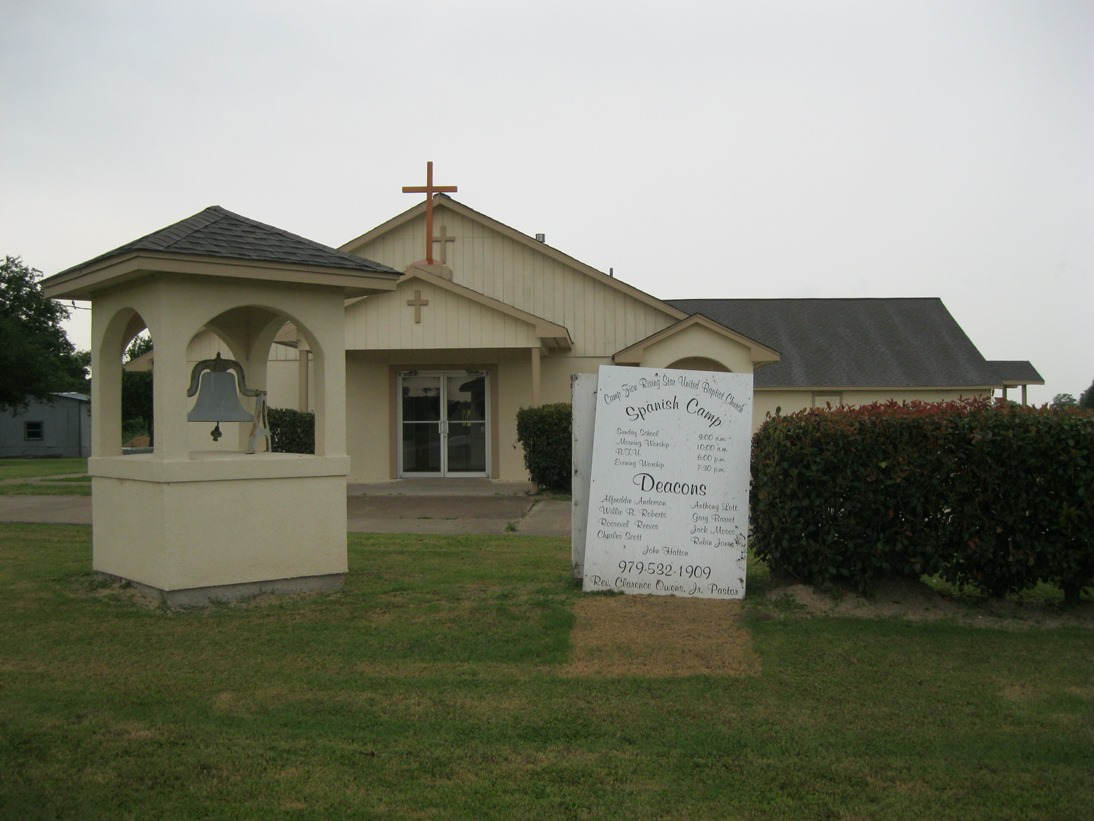
Camp Zion and Rising Star Baptist Church is on FM 1161 in Spanish Camp.

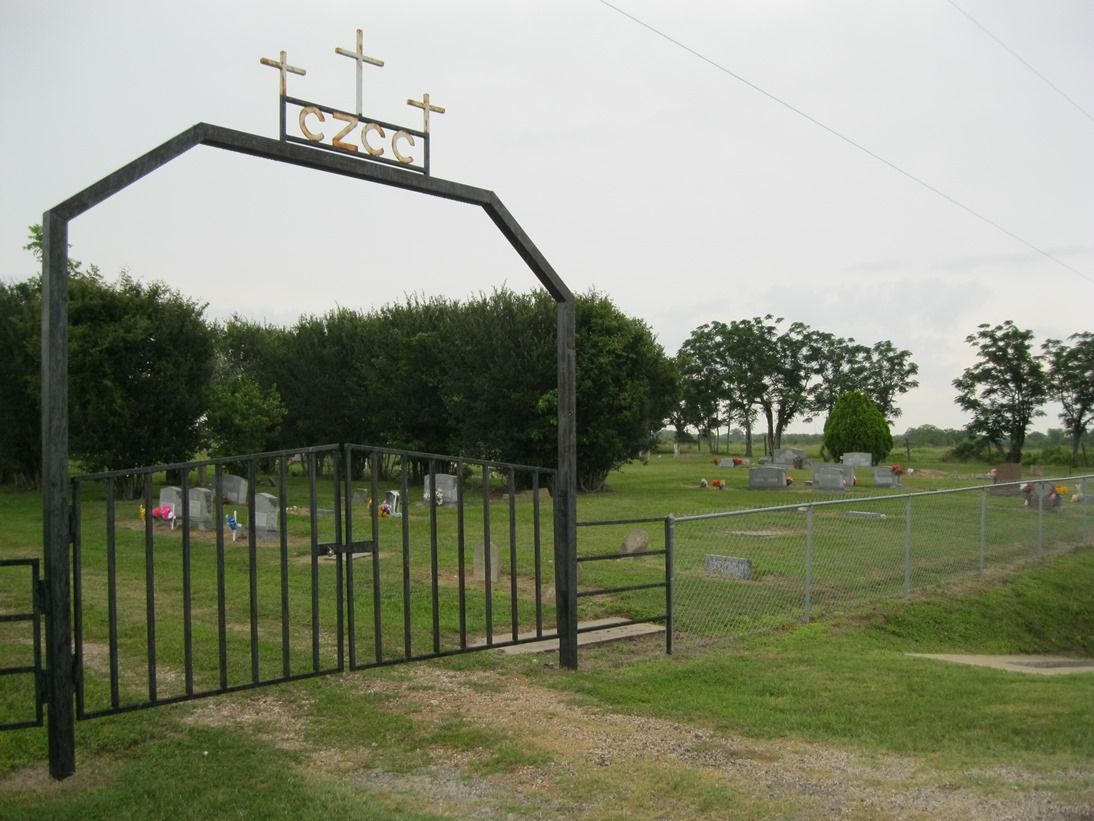
Camp Zion Church Cemetery is on FM 1161 northwest of Spanish Camp.

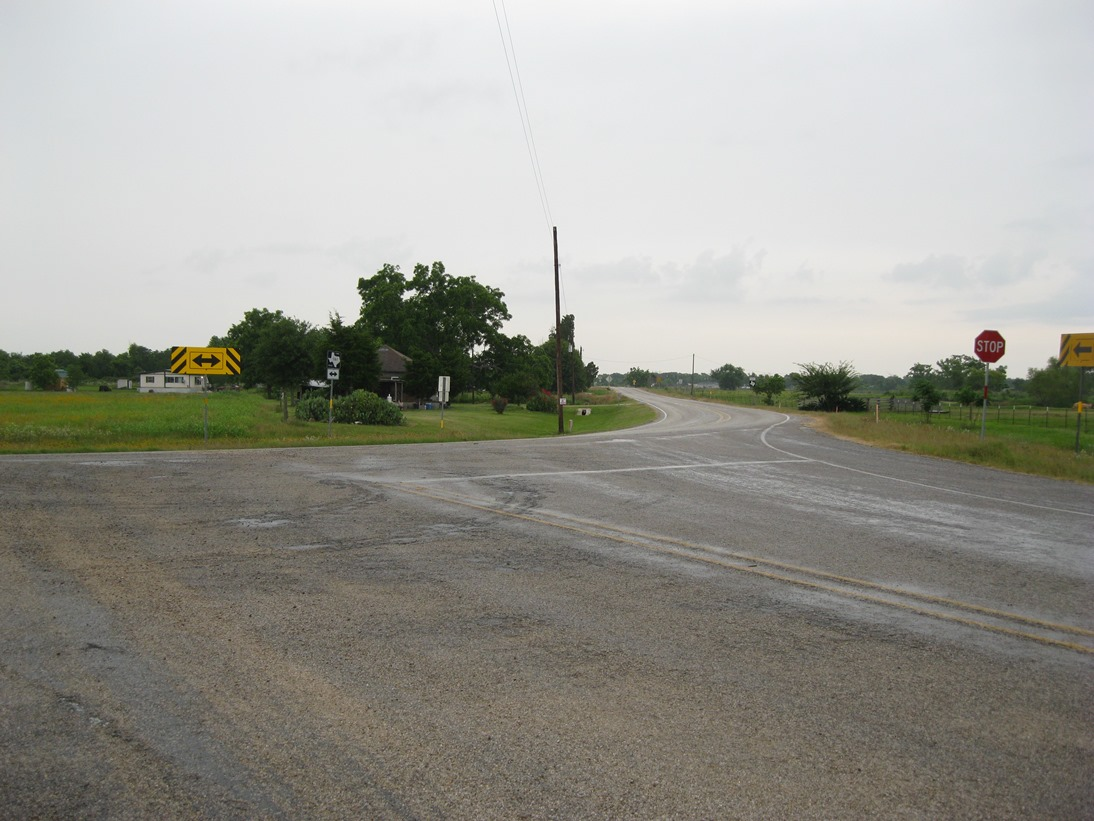
FM 1161 curves sharply to the northeast at FM 640 in Spanish Camp.
