= Mark Dennard =

American football player (born 1955)

No. 63, 65
- Position: Center

Personal information
- Born: November 2, 1955 (age 71); Bay City, Texas, U.S.
- Listed height: 6 ft 1 in (1.85 m)
- Listed weight: 253 lb (115 kg)

Career information
- High school: Bay City
- College: Texas A&M
- NFL draft: 1978: 10th round, 274th overall pick

Career history
- Miami Dolphins (1978–1983); Philadelphia Eagles (1984–1985); Cleveland Browns (1986)

Awards and highlights
- PFWA All-Rookie Team (1979); First-team All-SWC (1977)

Career NFL statistics
- Games played: 91
- Games started: 66
- Fumble recoveries: 2
- Stats at Pro Football Reference

Mark Wesley Dennard (born November 2, 1955) is an American former professional football player who was a center in the National Football League (NFL). He was selected by the Miami Dolphins in the 10th round of the 1978 NFL draft. He played college football for the Texas A&M Aggies.

Dennard also played for the Philadelphia Eagles and Cleveland Browns.
