= Farm to Market Road 1161 =

Road in Texas, United States

Farm to Market Road 1161

Route information
- Maintained by TxDOT
- Length: 13.933 mi (22.423 km)
- Existed: February 25, 1949–present

Major junctions
- West end: FM 102 in Egypt
- FM 640 in Spanish Camp; SH 60 / I-69 BL / Bus. US 59 in Hungerford; Future I-69 / US 59 in Hungerford
- East end: Boone's Bend Road

Location
- Country: United States
- State: Texas
- Counties: Wharton

Highway system
- Highways in Texas; Interstate; US; State; Former; Toll; Loops; Spurs; FM/RM; Park; Rec
← FM 1160	→ FM 1162

Farm to Market Road 1161 (FM 1161) is a farm-to-market road in Wharton County in the U.S. state of Texas. The two-lane highway begins at FM 102 at Egypt, heads in an easterly direction through Spanish Camp and Hungerford and ends at a rural road to the east of Hungerford.

== Route description ==
A two-lane highway along its entire route, FM 1161 begins at a stop sign on FM 102 in Egypt and heads to the east-southeast past the local post office. At 0.5 miles (0.8 km) from its starting point, FM 1164 passes the Heard Northington Plantation Museum and two state historical markers. After continuing to the east-southeast for 3.5 miles (5.6 km) and passing the Camp Zion Cemetery, the highway arrives at the intersection with FM 640. At the junction, FM 1161 turns sharply to the northeast as it goes through the community of Spanish Camp. From FM 640 to State Highway 60 (SH 60) is a distance of 6.4 miles (10.3 km). In this stretch, the highway heads first east-northeast, then east and finally east-southeast before crossing the Union Pacific Railroad and coming to a two-way stop sign at SH 60 and Future Business Interstate 69/Business U.S. Route 59. FM 1161 goes through the southern part of Hungerford for 0.4 miles (0.6 km) before crossing a bridge over Future Interstate 69 (Future I-69)/U.S. Route 59 (US 59). Traffic on FM 1161 can access I-69/US 59 in both directions via a half-cloverleaf on the south side. From I-69/US 59 to the end of FM 1161 at Boone's Bend Road is an additional 3.1 miles (5.0 km).

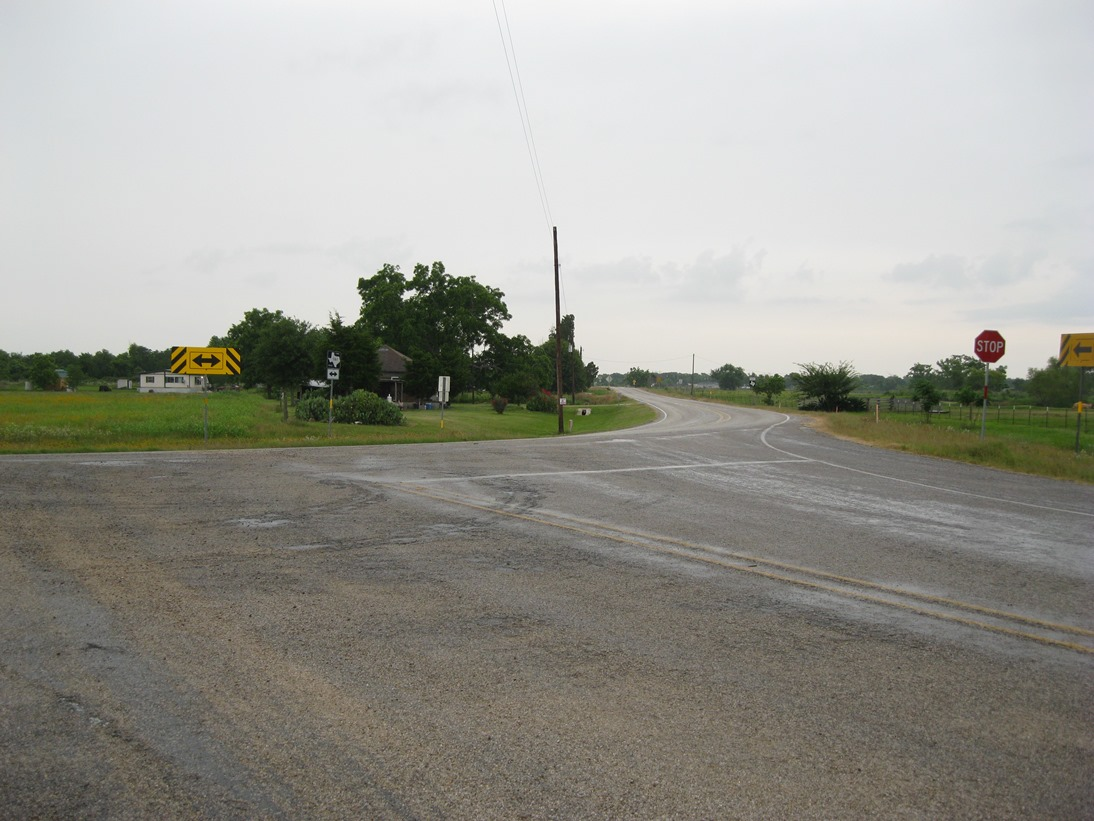
FM 1161 curves sharply to the northeast at its junction with FM 640 in Spanish Camp.

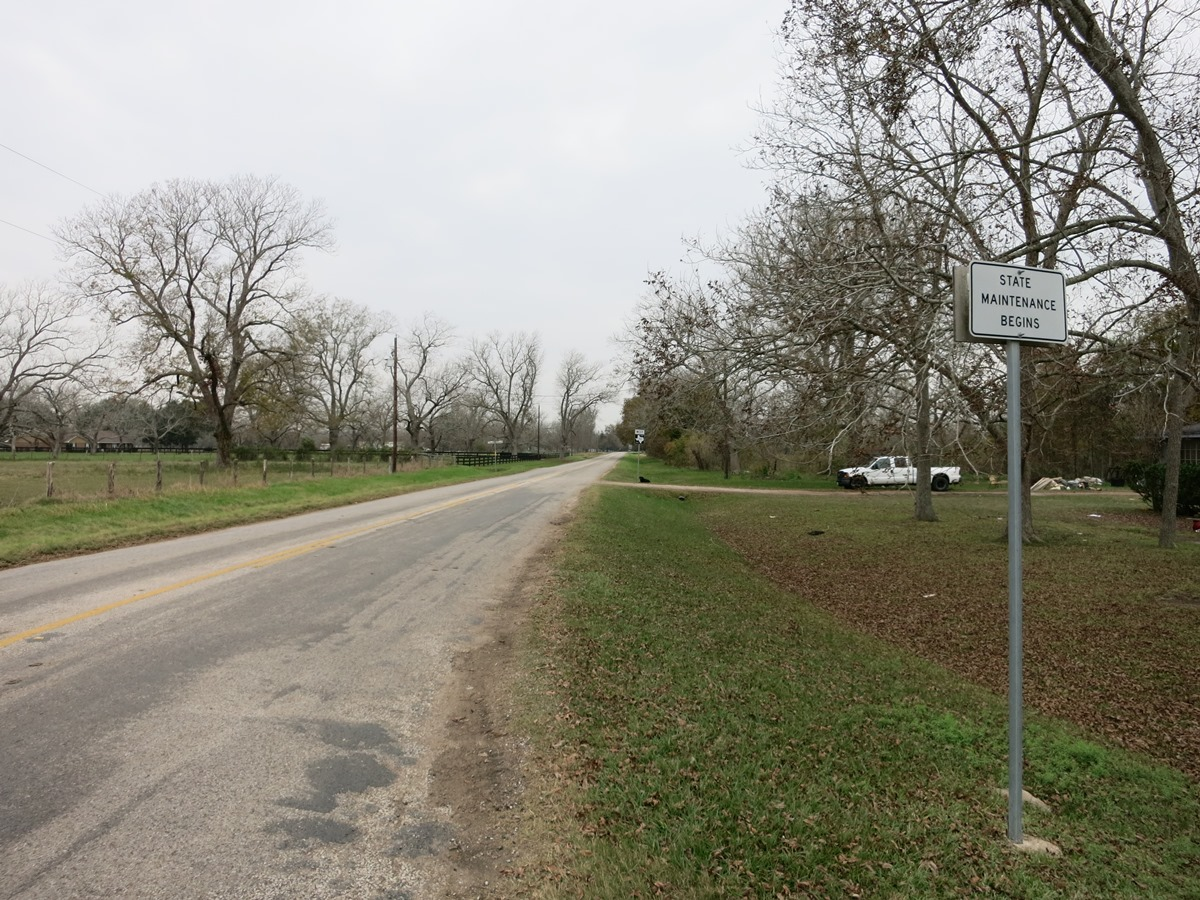
Start of FM 1161 at Boone's Bend Road east of Hungerford. View is west.

== History ==
FM 1161 was originally designated on February 25, 1949, to start at FM 102 in Egypt and go eastward a distance of roughly 10.5 miles (16.9 km) to US 59 near Hungerford. On May 23, 1951, the highway was extended farther east to an unnamed intersection, making a total distance of 11.6 miles (18.7 km). On November 20, 1951 a final eastward extension of about 2.4 miles (3.9 km) was authorized.

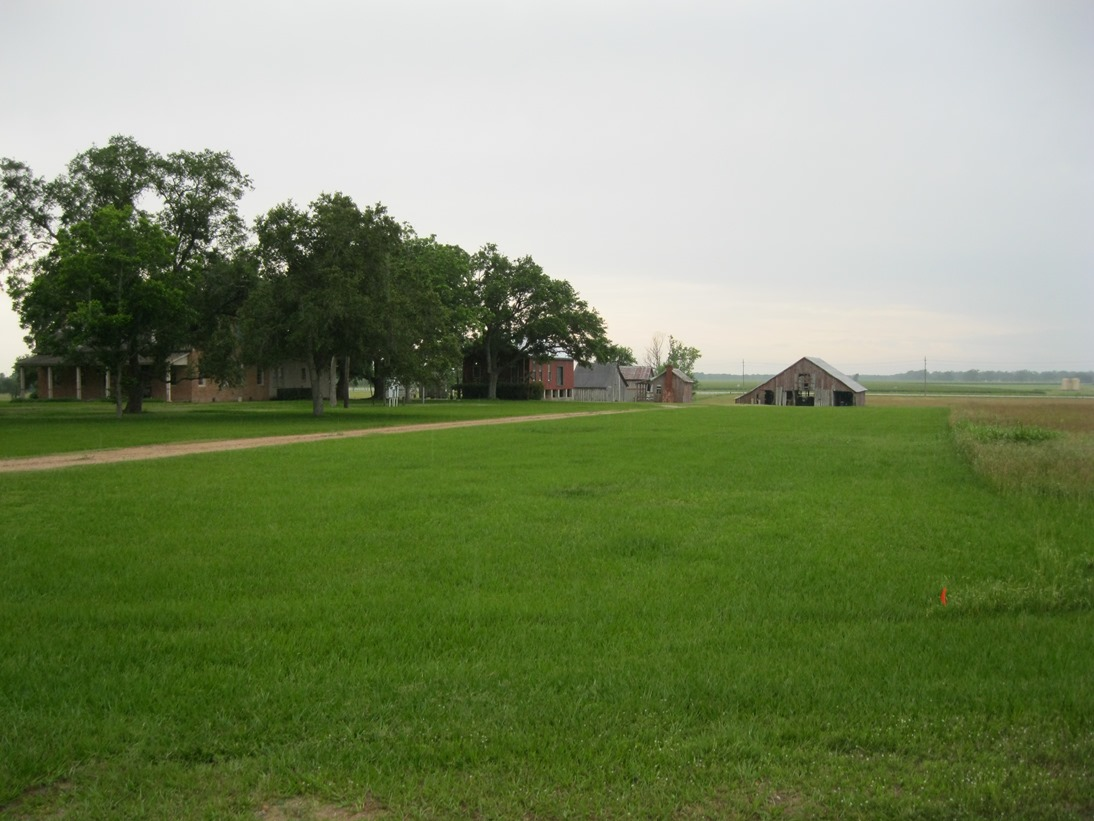
The view is south toward the Heard-Northington Plantation on FM 1161 in Egypt. The road beyond the barn is FM 102.

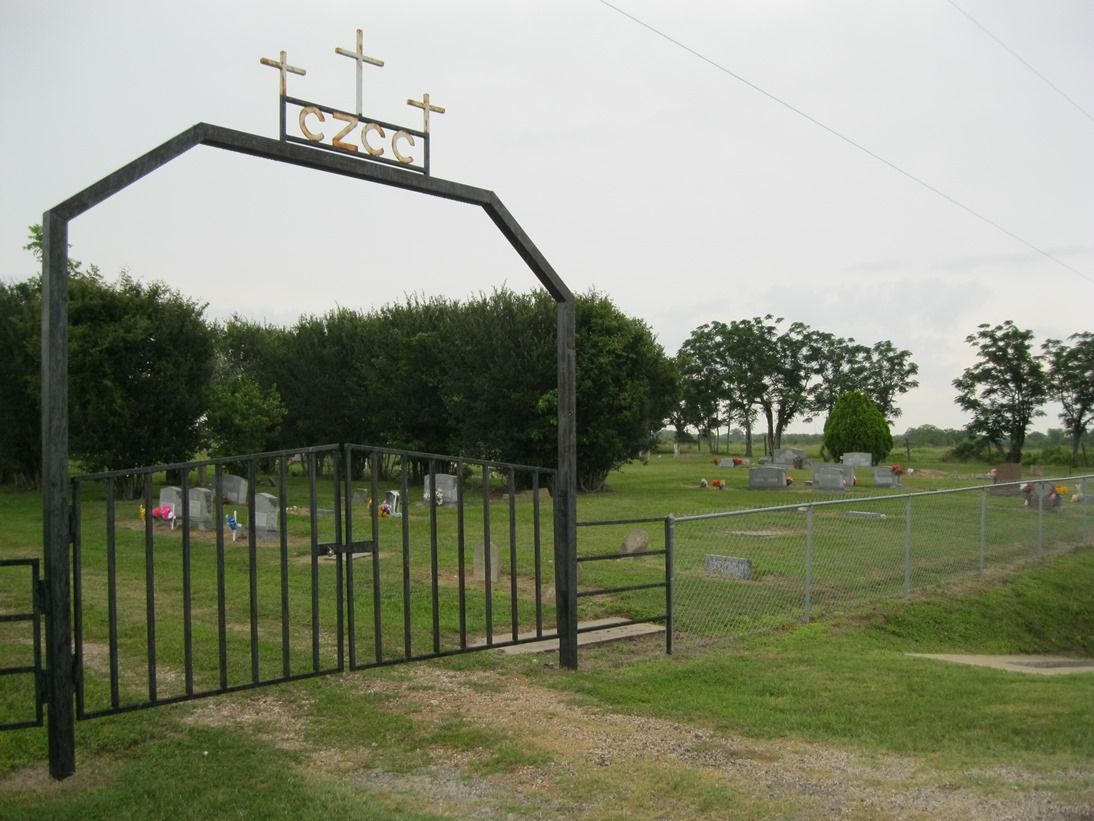
Camp Zion Church Cemetery is northwest of Spanish Camp on the north side of FM 1161.

== Major intersections ==
The entire highway is in Wharton County.

Location	mi	km	Destinations	Notes
Egypt	0.0	0.0	FM 102 – Eagle Lake, Wharton	Western terminus of FM 1161
Spanish Camp	4.0	6.4	FM 640 – Glen Flora	Northern terminus of FM 640
Hungerford	10.4	16.7	SH 60 / I-69 BL / Bus. US 59 – East Bernard, Wharton	
Hungerford	10.8	17.4	Future I-69 / US 59 – Wharton, Rosenberg, Houston	I-69/US 59 exit 77; U.S. 59 is the future Interstate 69
	13.9	22.4	Boone's Bend Road	Eastern terminus of FM 1161
1.000 mi = 1.609 km; 1.000 km = 0.621 mi
