= Bay City Independent School District =

School district in Texas, United States

Location
- Bay City, Texas ESC Region 3 USA
- Coordinates: 28°58′57″N 95°59′07″W

District information
- Type: Independent school district
- Motto: "Big city opportunities in a small town school."
- Grades: Pre-K through 12
- Established: 1900
- Superintendent: Dr. Marshall Scott III
- Schools: 8 (2009-10)
- NCES District ID: 4809630

Students and staff
- Students: 3,777 (2010-11)
- Teachers: 306.91 (2009-10) (on full-time equivalent (FTE) basis)
- Student–teacher ratio: 12.36 (2009-10)
- Athletic conference: UIL Class 4A Football & Basketball
- District mascot: Black Cats
- Colors: Royal Blue, Gold

Other information
- TEA District Accountability Rating for 2011: Academically Acceptable
- Website: Bay City ISD

Bay City Independent School District is a 4A public school district based in Bay City, Texas (USA). It is the largest school district in Matagorda county, covering 158 sq mi. BCISD operates five campuses: Bay City High School, Bay City Junior High, Tenie Holmes Elementary, Linnie Roberts Elementary, and John H. Cherry Elementary. The district is 20 miles from Matagorda Beach and the Gulf Coast of Mexico and 70 miles SW of Houston, serving 3,500 students and 550 employees.

In August 2022, the Board of Directors names Dr. Dwight McHazlett as the new Superintendent.

== Finances ==
As of the 2010-2011 school year, the appraised valuation of property in the district was $1,005,148,000. Bay City ISD's finance department is led by Chief Financial Officer Farrah Jernigan, who oversees the district's financial operations. The maintenance tax rate was $0.117 and the bond tax rate was $0.015 per $100 of appraised valuation.

== Academic achievement ==
In 2022, Bay City ISD received a scaled score of 88 and a "B" accountability rating from the TEA. When the score was broken down, they received a "B" in Student Achievement and an "A" in school progress.

== Schools ==
In the 2011-2012 school year, the district had six schools. On March 9, 2011, Superintendent Keith Brown announced a reduction in force in accordance with state and federal budget cuts, with Bay City Intermediate School and McAllister Intermediate School closing effective August 2011.

=== Regular instructional ===
Bay City High School: Grades 9th-12th

- 400 7th Street, Bay City, TX 77414

Bay City Junior High: Grades 6th-8th

- 3010 Carey Smith Boulevard, Bay City, TX 77414

Tenie Holmes Elementary: Grades 3rd-5th

- 3200 5th Street, Bay City, TX 77414

Linnie Roberts Elementary: Grades 1st-2nd

- 4100 Hiram Brandon Drive, Bay City, TX 77414

John H. Cherry Elementary: Grades PreK 4-Kindergarten

- 2916 8th Street, Bay City, TX 77414

Additional Buildings

H.J. McAllister Administration Building

- 520 7th Street, Bay City, TX 77414

Transportation Department

- 2217 9th Street, Bay City, TX 77414

Maintenance, Custodial, & Special Programs

- 2801 15th Street, Bay City, TX 77414

IT Department

- 1507 Sycamore Ave, Bay City, TX 77414

== Mascot, School Colors, and Mottos ==
The district mascot is a blackcat and is recognized at the junior high as a "panther." The name of the high school mascot is "Jinx" and is a female blackcat that wears a bow.

The school colors are royal blue (hex #18439f) and gold (hex #e8b828).

Bay City High School and the Athletic Department Motto: Blackcat Fight Never Dies

Bay City Junior High Motto:

Tenie Holmes Elementary: Living the Blackcat Dream

Linnie Roberts: Every Student Grows Everyday

Cherry Elementary Motto: Where the Blackcat Legacy Begins

=== Closed schools ===
- McAllister Intermediate

Although this school received an accountability rating in 2011, it is no longer listed in the state school directory for the 2011-2012 school year.

- Bay City Intermediate

Although this school received an accountability rating in 2011, it is no longer listed in the state school directory for the 2011-2012 school year.

== See also ==
- List of school districts in Texas
