= Hungerford, Texas =

- Census-designated place
- Location of Hungerford, Texas
- Coordinates: 29°23′57″N 96°4′37″W
- Country: United States
- State: Texas
- County: Wharton

Area
  - Total: 1.8 sq mi (4.7 km^{2})
  - Land: 1.8 sq mi (4.7 km^{2})
  - Water: 0 sq mi (0.0 km^{2})
- Elevation: 105 ft (32 m)

Population (2020)
  - Total: 390
  - Density: 210/sq mi (83/km^{2})
- Time zone: UTC-6 (Central (CST))
  - Summer (DST): UTC-5 (CDT)
- ZIP code: 77448
- Area code: 979
- FIPS code: 48-35420
- GNIS feature ID: 1338297

Hungerford is a census-designated place (CDP) in northeastern Wharton County, Texas, United States. U.S. Route 59, Texas State Highway 60, and Farm to Market Road 1161 intersect in the community. The Kansas City Southern Railway Co. passes through Hungerford. The population was 390 at the 2020 census. It is located on what in the 1820s was part of colonist Alexander Jackson's land grant north of George E. Quinan's home. By the 1870s, the Quinan settlement grew up a short distance away, but its residents moved to the new town when the railroad came through Hungerford.

== Geography ==
Hungerford is located at 29°23′57″N 96°4′37″W (29.399122, -96.077019).

According to the United States Census Bureau, the CDP has a total area of 1.8 square miles (4.7 km^{2}), all land.

== History ==
Alexander Jackson was one of the Old Three Hundred colonists from the United States who accepted land grants from Stephen F. Austin. The Alexander Jackson league was a strip of land which was bounded on the southwest by the Colorado River, just northwest of present-day Wharton and ran northeast beyond West Bernard Creek. After the Texas Revolution, the Republic of Texas set up a short-lived ordnance depot called Post West Bernard Station at a location 3.5 miles (5.6 km) northwest of present-day Hungerford. Its purpose was to recondition weapons captured at the Battle of San Jacinto and to watch for a possible invasion by the Mexican army.

In 1872, the village of Quinan was founded approximately 0.25 miles (0.4 km) west of present-day Hungerford. The Quinan post office was established in 1874 in the general store owned by John C. Habermacher, who also served as postmaster. Habermacher was once a member of Edwin Booth's acting troupe. His wife, Annie Thatcher, was Alexander Jackson's granddaughter.

In 1882, the New York, Texas and Mexican Railway was built through the newly surveyed town of Hungerford, which was in the adjacent George W. Singleton league. Most of Quinan's businesses moved to the railroad, followed by the post office in 1883. The new town was named after Daniel E. Hungerford, who was the father-in-law of Count Joseph Telfener, president of the company, and of the railroad's major investor, John William Mackay.

In 1885, Hungerford boasted 200 residents, several churches, a steam cotton gin, a gristmill, and a school. In 1908, the town became the headquarters for the J. D. Hudgins Ranch. In 1926, the Strouhal Tire Recapping Company opened in Hungerford. That year, the town had 13 businesses, including three general stores. Five different area schools counted a total of 259 black students, 189 white students, and 13 teachers. The 1927 poll tax enumerated 85 white voters and 64 black voters. In 1961 the population was 450 and 18 commercial establishments were in town. By that year, the train no longer stopped at Hungerford. In 1973, the local school district stopped operating and its students were absorbed by four nearby districts.

In the 1980s, there were 500 residents and most business was seasonal: hunting and harvesting cotton, grain, and pecans. In 1980, the Teen Challenge of South Texas New Life Rehabilitation Center bought the former black school. Between its opening and 1990, its enrollment increased from 150 to 250. In 2018, it was the Straightway Training Center, a Christian-based drug and alcohol rehabilitation program. In 1986, the Texas Historical Commission located four markers in Hungerford. In the late 1980s, U.S. Route 59 was rerouted to bypass Hungerford. In 2000, the population was 645.

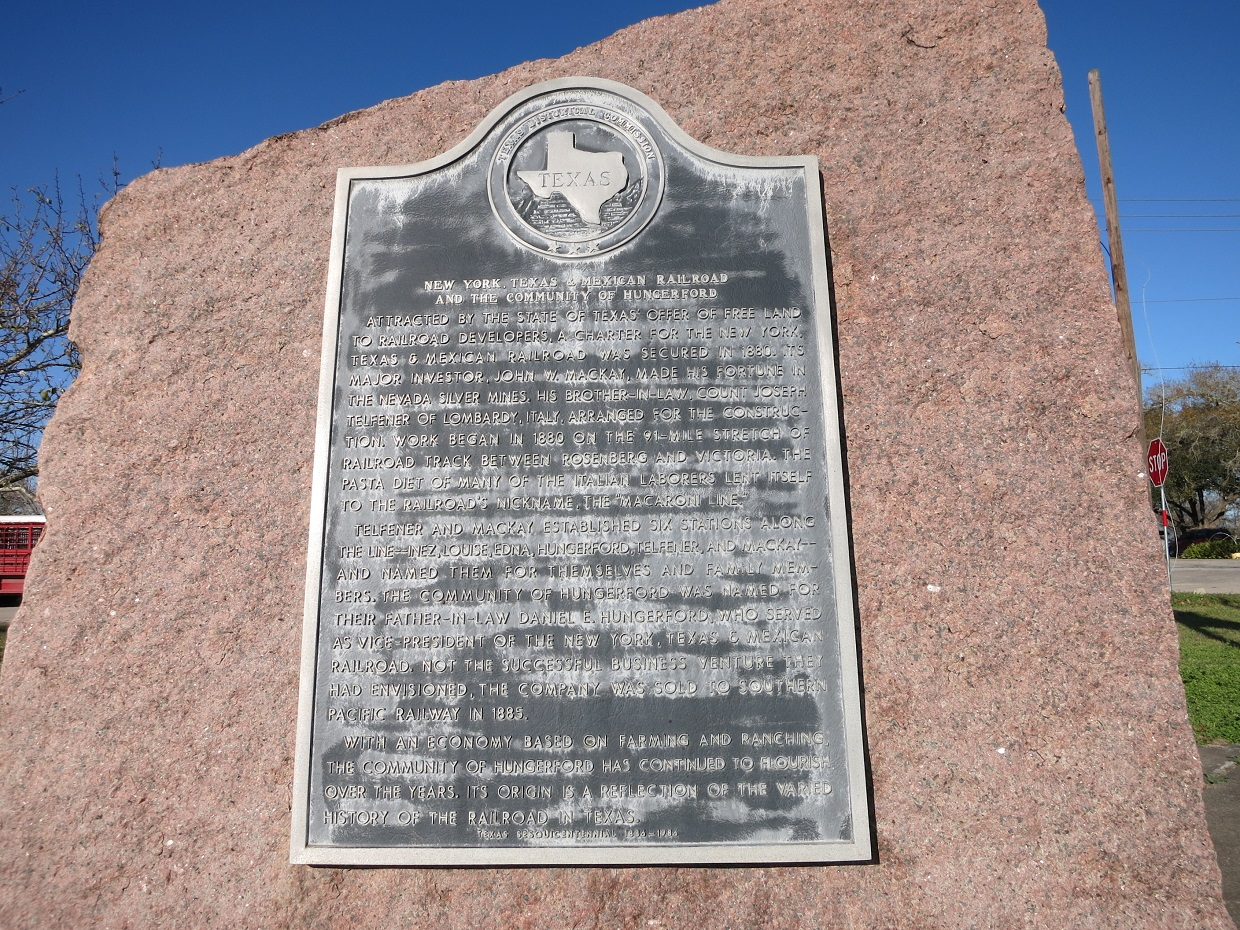
New York, Texas & Mexican Railroad historical marker

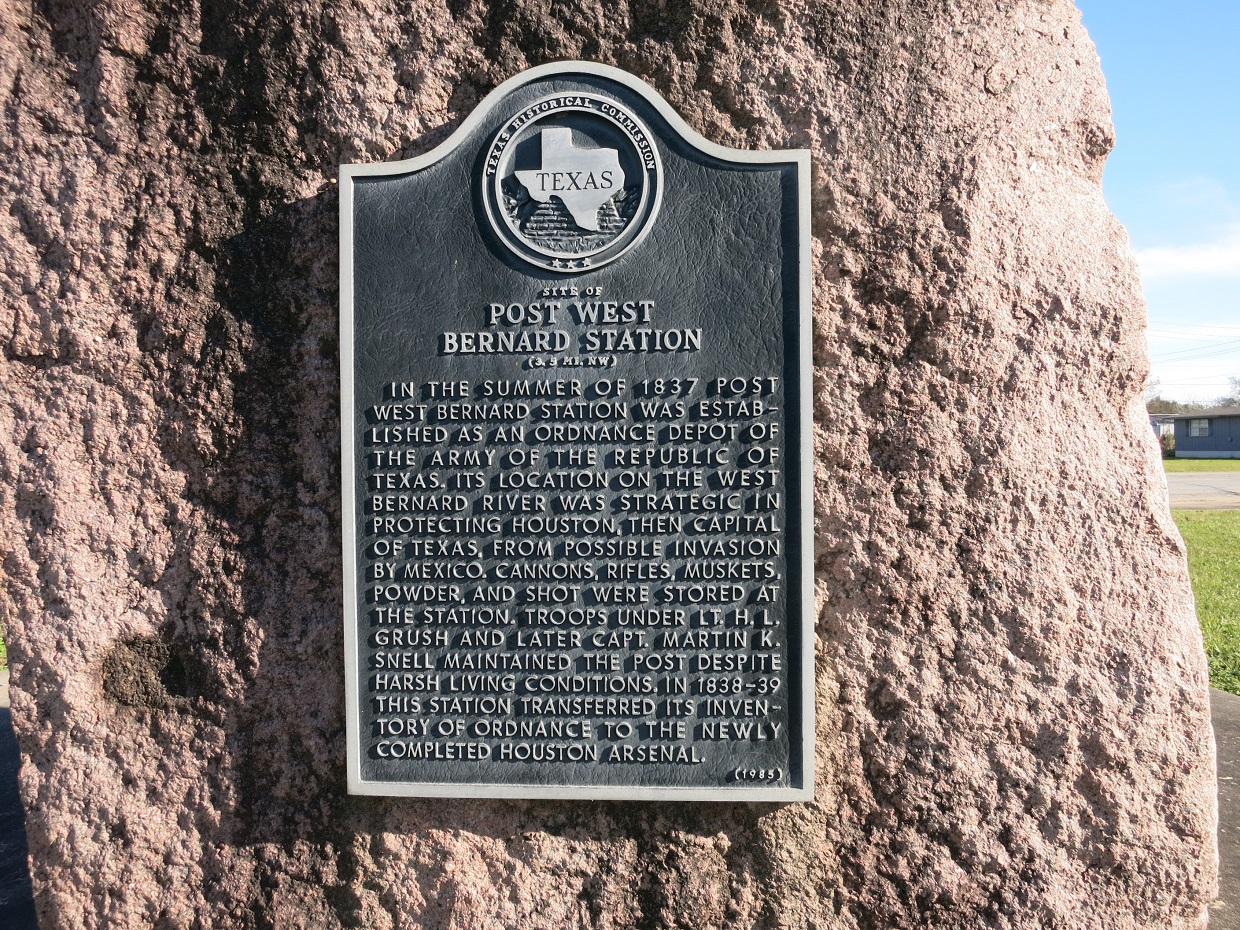
Post West Bernard Station historical marker

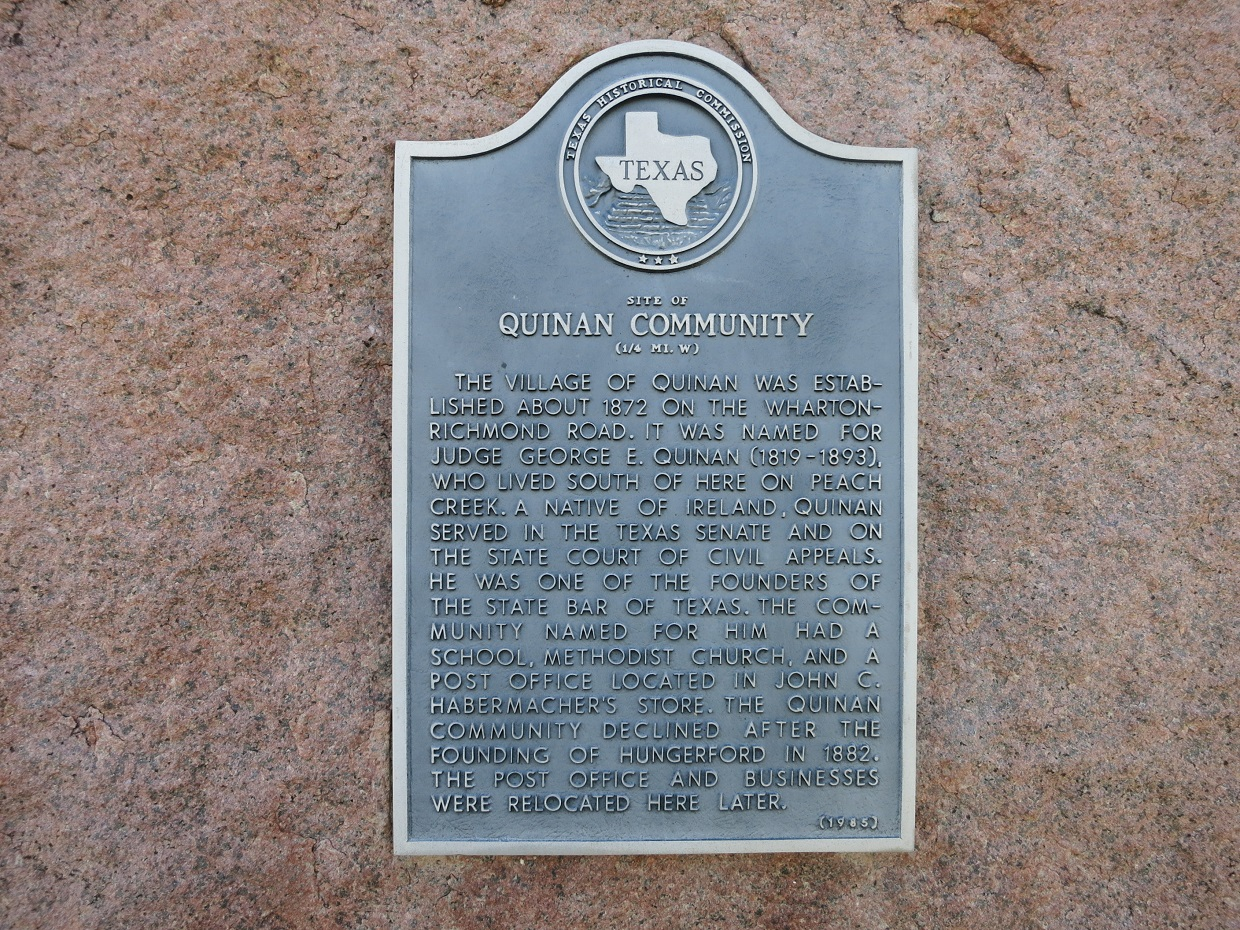
Quinan Community historical marker

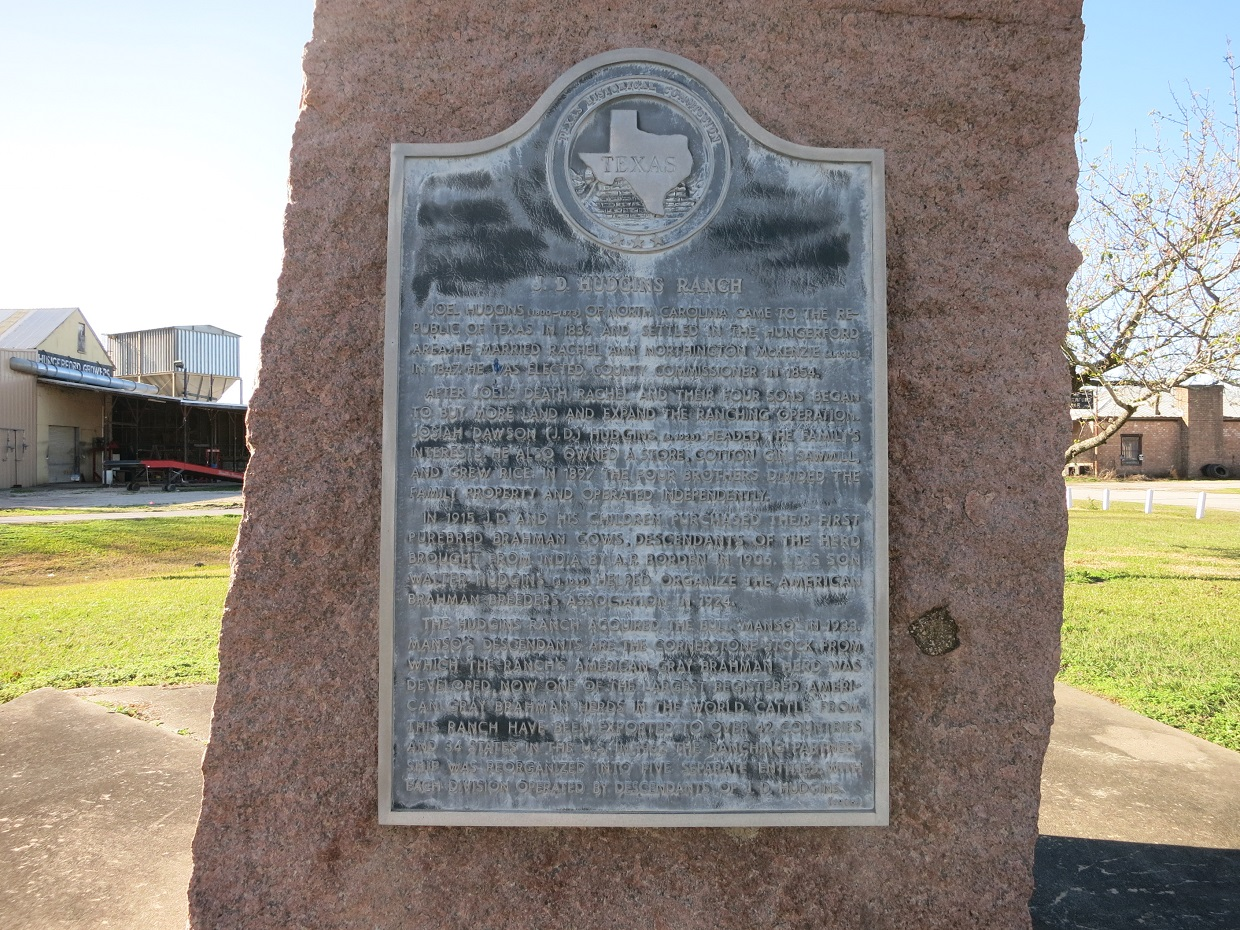
J. D. Hudgins Ranch historical marker

== Demographics ==
Historical population
Census	Pop.	Note	%±
2000	645		—
2010	347		−46.2%
2020	390		12.4%
U.S. Decennial Census; 1850–1900 1910; 1920 1930 1940; 1950 1960 1970; 1980 1990 2000; 2010 2020

Hungerford first appeared as a census-designated place in the 2000 U.S. census.

=== 2020 census ===
Hungerford CDP, Texas – Racial and ethnic composition Note: the US Census treats Hispanic/Latino as an ethnic category. This table excludes Latinos from the racial categories and assigns them to a separate category. Hispanics/Latinos may be of any race.
Race / Ethnicity (NH = Non-Hispanic)	Pop 2000	Pop 2010	Pop 2020	% 2000	% 2010	% 2020
White alone (NH)	300	133	122	46.51%	38.33%	31.28%
Black or African American alone (NH)	200	134	128	31.01%	38.62%	32.82%
Native American or Alaska Native alone (NH)	0	0	2	0.00%	0.00%	0.51%
Asian alone (NH)	0	1	1	0.00%	0.29%	0.26%
Native Hawaiian or Pacific Islander alone (NH)	0	0	0	0.00%	0.00%	0.00%
Other race alone (NH)	0	0	2	0.00%	0.00%	0.51%
Mixed race or Multiracial (NH)	3	2	7	0.47%	0.58%	1.79%
Hispanic or Latino (any race)	142	77	128	22.02%	22.19%	32.82%
Total	645	347	390	100.00%	100.00%	100.00%

As of the census of 2000, there were 645 people, 169 households, and 117 families residing in the CDP. The population density was 352.1 inhabitants per square mile (135.9/km^{2}). There were 177 housing units at an average density of 96.6 per square mile (37.3/km^{2}). The racial makeup of the CDP was 52.87% White, 31.16% African American, 14.26% from other races, and 1.71% from two or more races. Hispanic or Latino of any race were 22.02% of the population.

There were 169 households, out of which 33.1% had children under the age of 18 living with them, 46.2% were married couples living together, 18.9% had a female householder with no husband present, and 30.2% were non-families. 24.3% of all households were made up of individuals, and 14.8% had someone living alone who was 65 years of age or older. The average household size was 3.04 and the average family size was 3.72.

In the CDP, the population was spread out, with 37.7% under the age of 18, 7.4% from 18 to 24, 26.7% from 25 to 44, 18.0% from 45 to 64, and 10.2% who were 65 years of age or older. The median age was 30 years. For every 100 females, there were 90.3 males. For every 100 females age 18 and over, there were 81.1 males.

The median income for a household in the CDP was $46,544, and the median income for a family was $55,781. Males had a median income of $34,688 versus $18,214 for females. The per capita income for the CDP was $16,191. About 7.3% of families and 15.2% of the population were below the poverty line, including 3.7% of those under age 18 and 19.0% of those age 65 or over.

== Government and infrastructure ==
The United States Postal Service Hungerford Post Office is located at 210 East Live Oak Street.

== Education ==
The CDP is divided between the Boling Independent School District and the Wharton Independent School District. The comprehensive high school of the former is Boling High School.

The Texas Legislature assigns all of Wharton County to Wharton County Junior College.

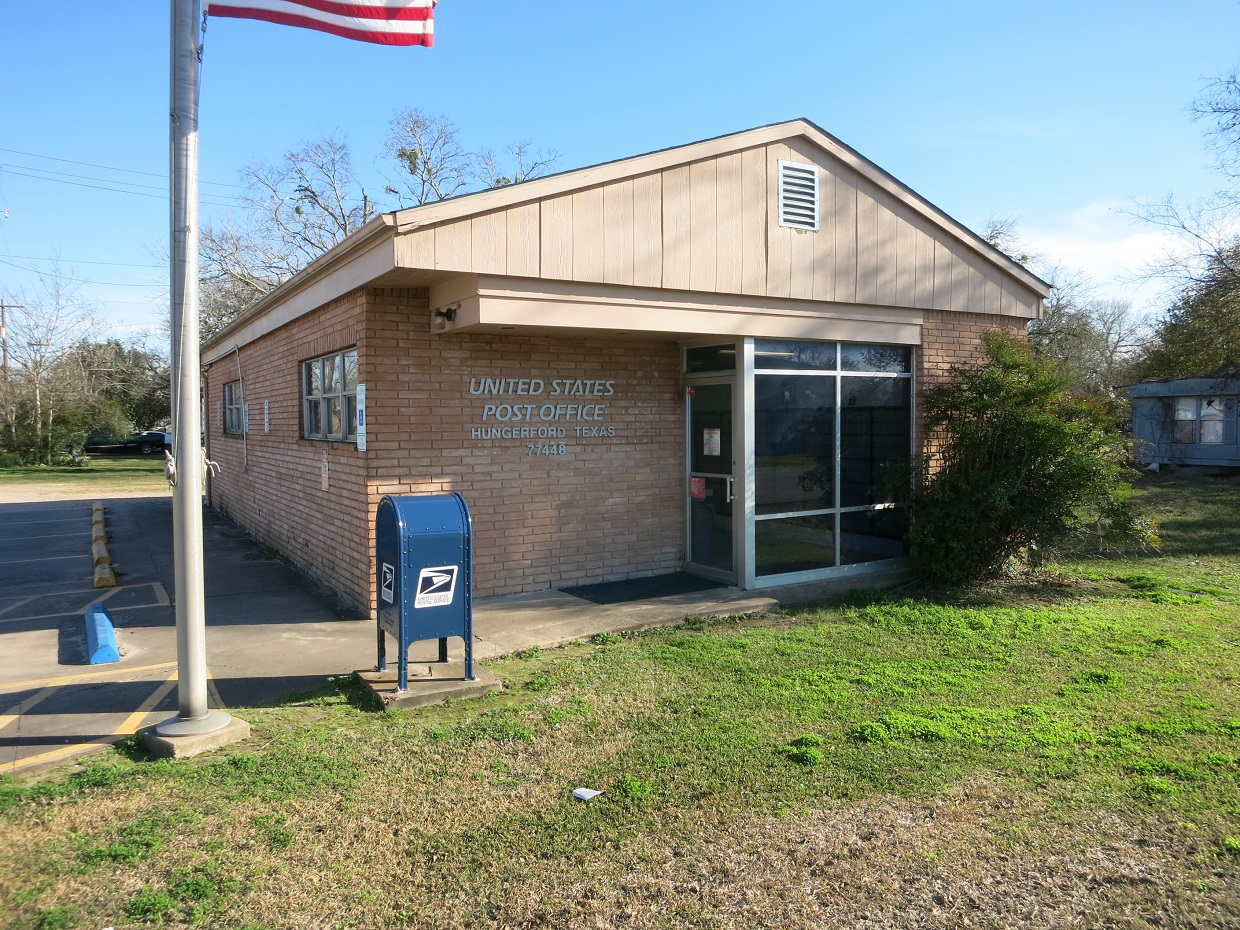
US Post Office at Live Oak St. and Hwy. 60

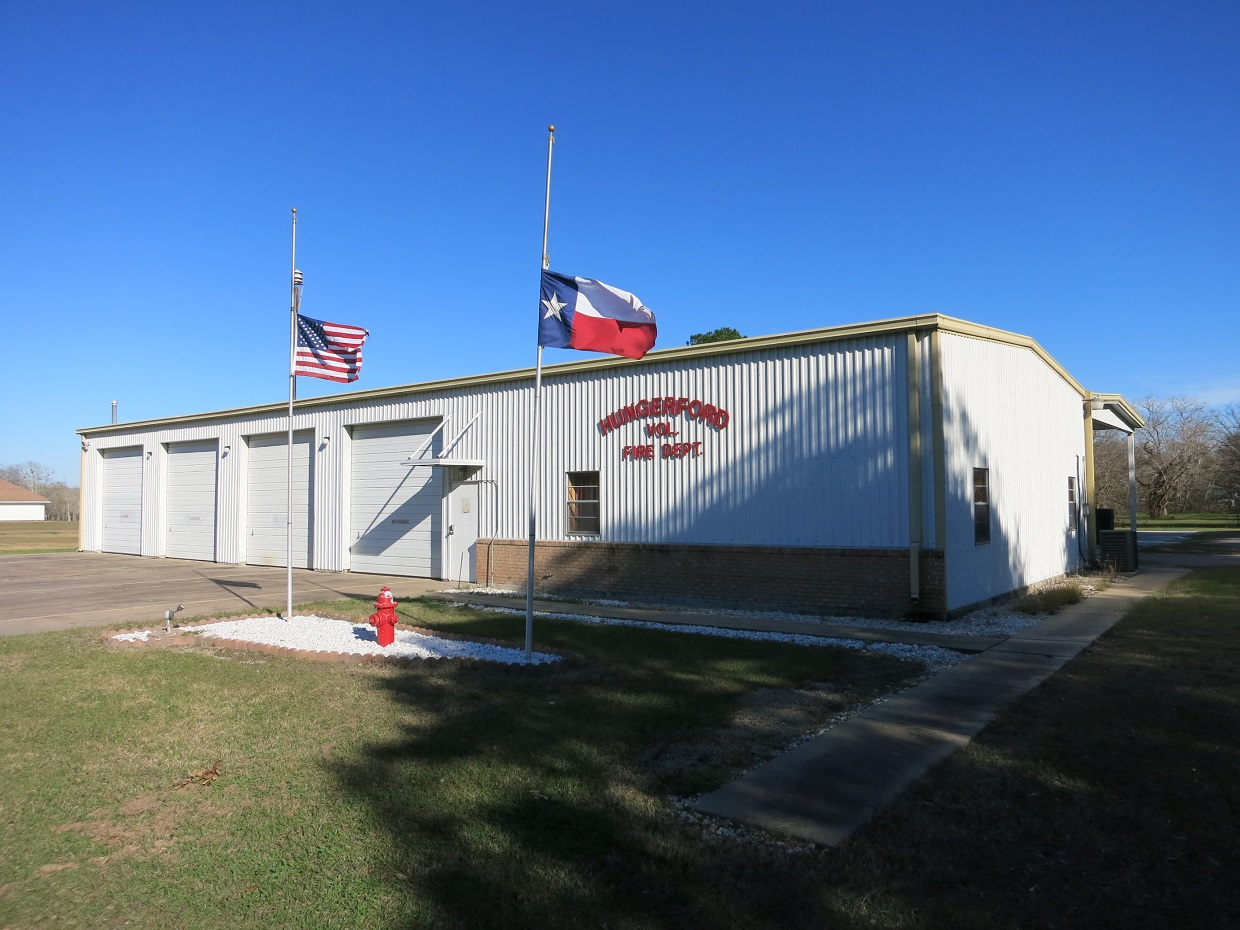
Hungerford Volunteer Fire Station

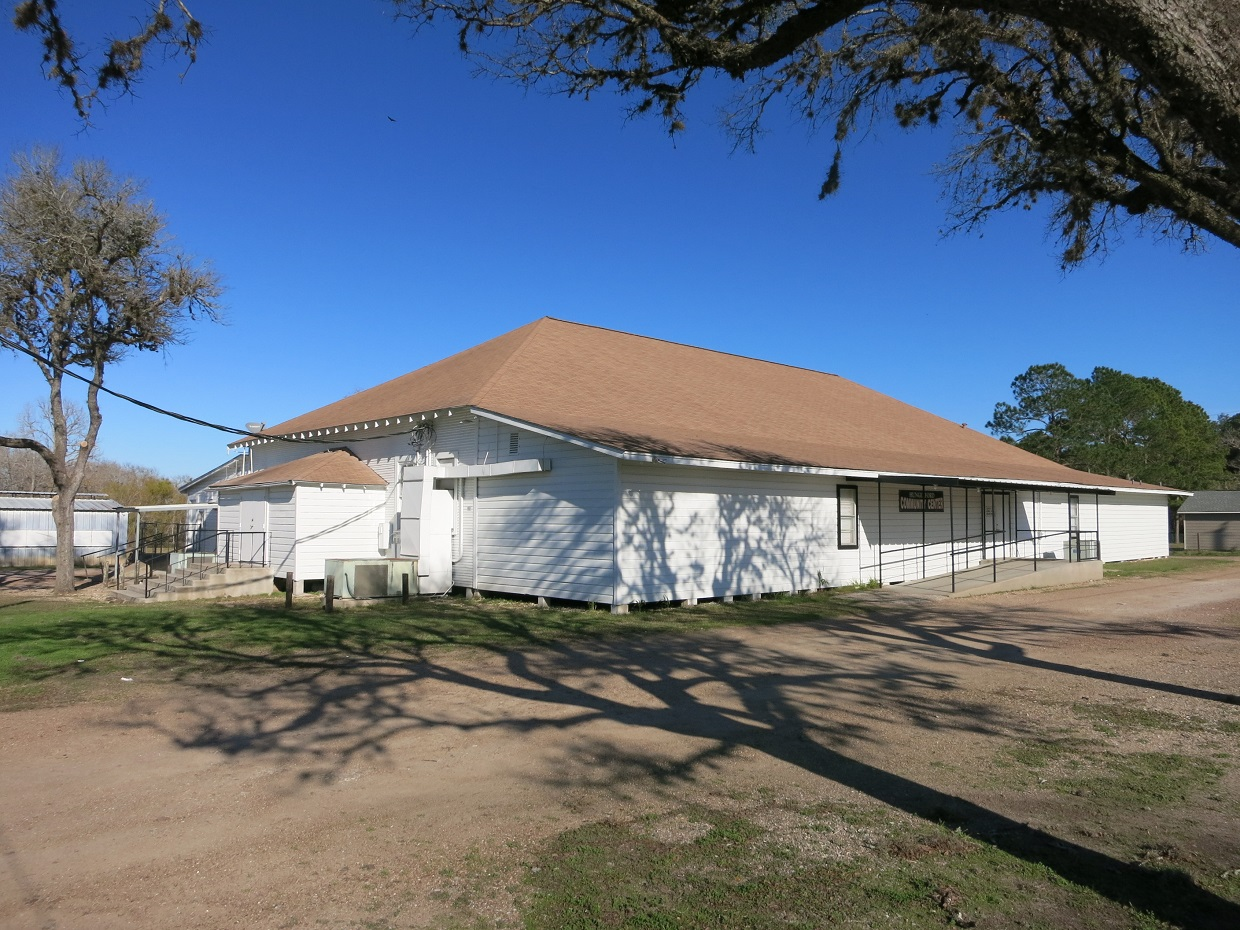
Hungerford Community Center on Cypress St.

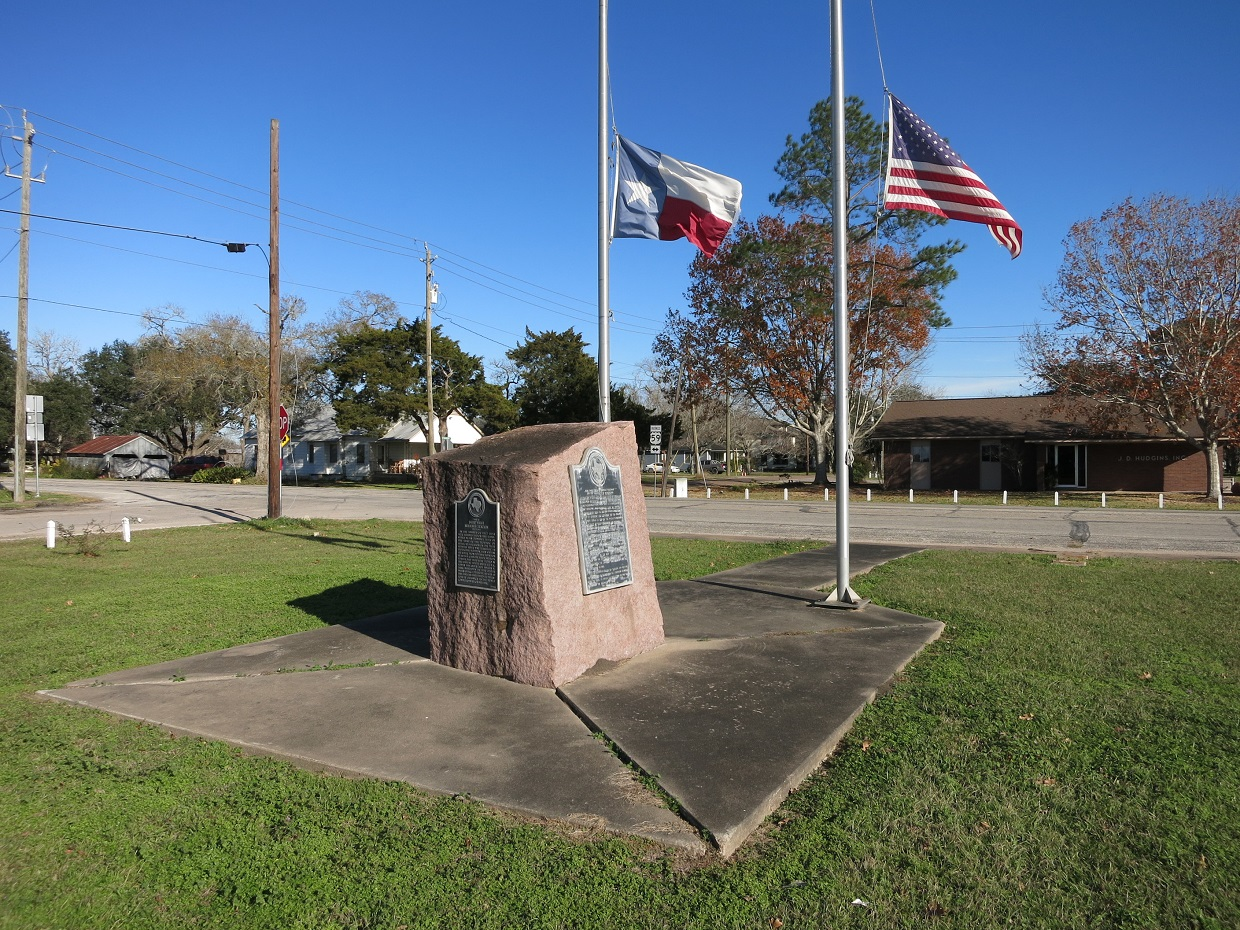
Granite rock displays four historical markers
