= Bay City High School =

Coordinates: 28.9803°N 95.9855°W

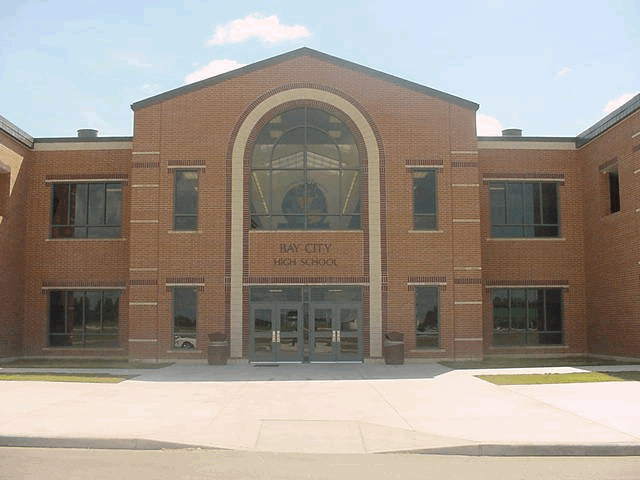

Location
- 400 7th Street; Bay City, Matagorda, Texas 77414; United States

Information
- School type: Public high school
- Motto: Home of the Blackcats
- School district: Bay City Independent School District
- Superintendent: Chris Townsend
- CEEB code: 440475
- Principal: Mary Lynn Mosier Flores
- Teaching staff: 75.36 (FTE)
- Grades: 9-12
- Enrollment: 1,034 (2023-2024)
- Student to teacher ratio: 13.72
- Colors: Royal blue and gold
- Mascot: Blackcat
- Rival: El Campo High School
- Website: Bay City High School

Bay City High School is a public high school located on Texas State Highway 35 on the western edge of Bay City, Texas, United States.

== School ==
A new school campus was opened in 2002.

== Academics ==
The school offers a curriculum in line with Texas state standards. Additional college prep programs include Advanced Placement or dual-credit courses, which are taken via Wharton County Junior College and AVID. A number of career and technical programs are available to Bay City students, including articulated courses with Wharton County Junior College and certifications in Cosmetology–Human Services, OSHA and Career Safe–Construction/Career Prep, CPR, Pharmacy Technician, Certified Nurse Aide–Health Science, Welding-Manufacturing, Microsoft Office Work–Business Management, and Manage First; ServSafe–Hospitality.

=== College entrance ===
Many BCHS students are offered scholarships by Wharton County Junior College. Texas offers automatic college admissions to high school seniors who are in the top ten percent of their graduating class, determined by grade point average. The Bay City High School class of 2009 was awarded over one million dollars in scholarships.

== Extracurricular activities ==
Student groups and activities at Bay City may include but are not limited to:

- Band
- Cheerleading
- Choir
- Dance team
- DECA
- Drama
- Dungeoneers
- Educators Rising
- Fellowship of Christian Athletes
- FFA
- Flag corps
- HOSA
- Interact
- Key Club
- National Honor Society
- Spanish club
- Speech and Debate
- Student Council
- VICA
- Yearbook

Past state championship titles include:

- One-Act Play: 1999 (4A), 2003 (4A)
- Team Debate: 2006 (4A), 2008 (4A)

=== Athletics ===
BCHS is classified as a division 4A high school by the University Interscholastic League. The athletic director is Patrick Matthews.

The schools athletic teams, known as the Blackcats (bearing the power-cat logo), compete in:

- Baseball
- Basketball
- Cross country
- Football
- Golf
- Powerlifting
- Soccer
- World series poker
- Softball
- Swim
- Tennis
- Track
- Volleyball

Past state championship titles include:

- Boys' basketball: 1985 (4A)
- Football: 1983 (4A), 2000 (4A Division I)
- Boys track and field: 1979 (3A), 1984 (4A), 1990 (4A)

== Notable alumni ==
- Forrest Bess, painter
- Joe DeLoach, Gold Medalist in track, 1988 Summer Olympics
- Mark Dennard, Former NFL Player, Miami Dolphins
- Hart Lee Dykes, former NFL player
- Simon Fletcher, former NFL player, Denver Broncos
- Tracy Freeman, American Trial Lawyer
- Ricardo Ramirez, Bishop of Las Cruces
- LaBradford Smith, professional basketball player
