= List of Farm to Market Roads in Texas (2500–2599) =

- Texas Farm to Market Road and Ranch to Market Road markers

Highway names
- Interstates: Interstate Highway X (IH-X, I-X)
- US Highways: U.S. Highway X (US X)
- State: State Highway X (SH X)
- Loops: Loop X
- Spurs: Spur X
- Recreational: Recreational Road X (RE X)
- Farm or Ranch to Market Roads: Farm to Market Road X (FM X); Ranch to Market Road X (RM X)
- Park Roads: Park Road X (PR X)

System links
- Highways in Texas; Interstate; US; State; Former; Toll; Loops; Spurs; FM/RM; Park; Rec

Farm to Market Roads in Texas are owned and maintained by the Texas Department of Transportation (TxDOT).

== FM 2500 ==
Farm to Market Road 2500
- Location: Polk County
- Length: 6.215 mi (10.002 km)
- Existed: 1957–present

== FM 2501 ==
Farm to Market Road 2501
- Location: Trinity County
- Length: 6.104 mi (9.823 km)
- Existed: 1957–present

== FM 2502 ==
Farm to Market Road 2502
- Location: Washington and Austin counties
- Length: 19.137 mi (30.798 km)
- Existed: 1957–present

== FM 2503 ==
Farm to Market Road 2503
- Location: Fayette County
- Length: 6.134 mi (9.872 km)
- Existed: 1957–present

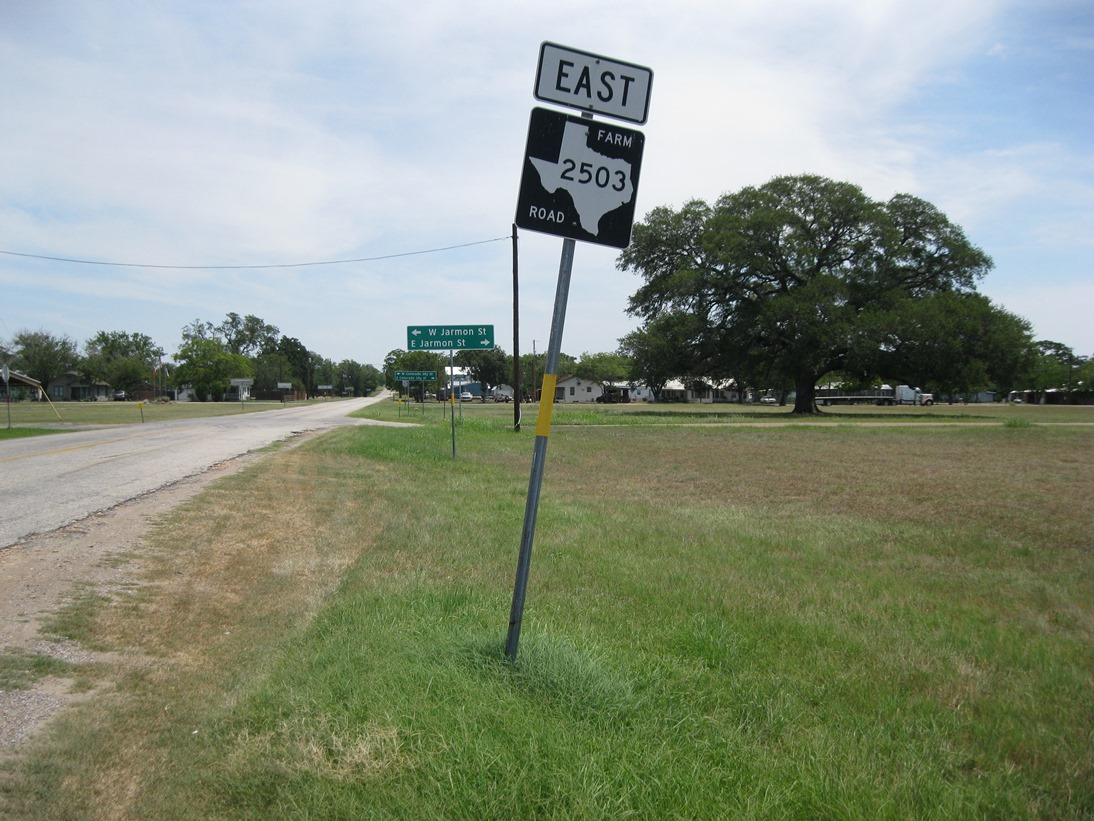
Route marker for FM 2503 in Ellinger

Farm to Market Road 2503 (FM 2503) is located in Fayette County. It runs from SH 71 in Ellinger to FM 1291 southeast of Fayetteville.

FM 2503 was designated on October 31, 1957, along its current route.

== FM 2504 ==
Farm to Market Road 2504
- Location: Atascosa County
- Length: 9.592 mi (15.437 km)
- Existed: 1957–present

== FM 2505 ==
Farm to Market Road 2505
- Location: Wilson County
- Length: 14.93 mi (24.03 km)
- Existed: 1957–present

== FM 2506 ==
Farm to Market Road 2506
- Location: Goliad County
- Length: 6.103 mi (9.822 km)
- Existed: 1957–present

== FM 2507 ==
Farm to Market Road 2507
- Location: Jim Wells County
- Length: 1.039 mi (1.672 km)
- Existed: 1957–present

== FM 2508 ==
Farm to Market Road 2508
- Location: Jim Wells County
- Length: 5.849 mi (9.413 km)
- Existed: 1957–present

== FM 2509 ==
Farm to Market Road 2509
- Location: Karnes County
- Length: 5.657 mi (9.104 km)
- Existed: 1957–present

== FM 2510 ==
Farm to Market Road 2510
- Location: Kleberg County
- Length: 1.964 mi (3.161 km)
- Existed: 1957–present

== FM 2511 ==
Farm to Market Road 2511
- Location: Refugio County
- Length: 2.001 mi (3.220 km)
- Existed: 1957–present

== FM 2512 ==
Farm to Market Road 2512
- Location: San Patricio County
- Length: 2.012 mi (3.238 km)
- Existed: 1957–present

== FM 2513 ==
Farm to Market Road 2513
- Location: Brazos County
- Existed: October 31, 1957–December 14, 1989

Farm to Market Road 2513 (FM 2513) was located in Brazos County. No highway currently uses the FM 2513 designation.

FM 2513 was designated on October 31, 1957, traveling from the intersection of Carson Street and Turkey Creek Road in Bryan southward to FM 60 west of College Station at a distance of 3.6 miles (5.8 km). The section of highway between FM 2818 and FM 60 was transferred to FM 2818 on October 8, 1965, decreasing the route's length by 2.6 miles (4.2 km). FM 2513 was cancelled and removed from the state highway system on December 14, 1989, with maintenance being turned over to the city of Bryan.

== FM 2514 ==
Farm to Market Road 2514
- Location: Collin County
- Length: 8.632 mi (Note: The certified length given is shorter than the actual mileage, as the TxDOT description of FM 2514 considers it to be discontinuous at rather than concurrent with FM 2551 and FM 1378.) (13.892 km)
- Existed: September 27, 1960–present

Farm to Market Road 2514 (FM 2514) is located in Collin County.

The western terminus of FM 2514 is at the Plano–Parker city line; the continuation into Plano is known appropriately as Parker Road. The route travels east through Parker and Saint Paul before turning southward into Wylie. The route ends at SH 78 in central Wylie.

An unrelated route numbered FM 2514 was designation on October 31, 1957, in Robertson County from FM 2293 5 miles (8.0 km) north of Owensville northeast to SH 7. That mileage was canceled on December 31, 1959, and transferred to FM 979.

The current FM 2514 was designated from Plano to Parker on September 25, 1960, from SH 5 (the old routing of US 75) to FM 2551. It was extended to Wylie, to an intersection with FM 544 (later FM 3412), on June 1, 1965. The western terminus was truncated to the Plano city limits on October 28, 1987, when SH 5 and other state-maintained highways were removed from the highway system and returned to the city of Plano's jurisdiction. On June 27, 1995, the entire route was redesignated Urban Road 2514 (UR 2514). The route in Wylie was extended to SH 78 on May 28, 2009, replacing FM 3412 (which the section from FM 1378 to FM 2514 was given to the city of Wylie on November 20, 2008). On March 27, 2014, the section from Brown Street (former FM 3412) to SH 78 was removed from the state highway system. The designation of the route reverted to FM 2514 with the elimination of the Urban Road system on November 15, 2018.

Junction list

The entire route is in Collin County.

Location	mi	km	Destinations	Notes
Plano	0.0	0.0	Parker Rd.	Western terminus and continuation
Parker	1.9	3.1	FM 2551 north – Allen	West end of FM 2551 concurrency
Parker	2.3	3.7	FM 2551 south – Murphy	East end of FM 2551 concurrency
Wylie	4.8	7.7	FM 1378 north – Lucas	West end of FM 1378 concurrency
Wylie	5.0	8.0	FM 1378 south	East end of FM 1378 concurrency
Wylie	8.8	14.2	FM 3412	
Wylie	9.1	14.6	SH 78 – Garland	Eastern terminus (Note: Although traveling south–north in Wylie, the route is signed west–east.)
1.000 mi = 1.609 km; 1.000 km = 0.621 mi: Concurrency terminus

=== FM 2514 (1957) ===
Farm to Market Road 2514
- Location: Robertson County
- Existed: October 31, 1957–December 30, 1959

A previous route numbered FM 2514 was designated on October 31, 1957, from FM 2293, 5 miles (8.0 km) north of Owensville, northeast 12.5 miles (20.1 km) via Bald Prairie to SH 7. FM 2514 was cancelled on December 30, 1959, and transferred to FM 979.

== FM 2515 ==
Farm to Market Road 2515
- Location: Kaufman County
- Length: 2.529 mi (4.070 km)
- Existed: 1957–present

== FM 2516 ==
Farm to Market Road 2516
- Location: Bowie County
- Length: 6.543 mi (10.530 km)
- Existed: 1957–present

== FM 2517 ==
Farm to Market Road 2517
- Location: Panola County
- Length: 20.201 mi (32.510 km)
- Existed: 1957–present

== FM 2518 ==
Farm to Market Road 2518
- Location: Liberty County
- Length: 5.437 mi (8.750 km)
- Existed: 1957–present

== FM 2519 ==
Farm to Market Road 2519
- Location: Cameron County
- Length: 1.693 mi (2.725 km)
- Existed: October 31, 1957–present

Farm to Market Road 2519 (FM 2519) is located in Brownsville.

FM 2519 begins at SH 4 in central Brownsville. It travels to the south and east along Billy Mitchell Boulevard before state maintenance ends at the entrance to Brownsville/South Padre Island International Airport.

FM 2519 was designated on October 31, 1957, along its current route. On June 27, 1995, the entire route was redesignated Urban Road 2519 (UR 2519). The designation reverted to FM 2519 with the elimination of the Urban Road system on November 15, 2018.

== FM 2520 ==
Farm to Market Road 2520
- Location: Cameron County
- Length: 7.079 mi (11.393 km)
- Existed: 1957–present

== FM 2521 ==
Farm to Market Road 2521
- Location: Hidalgo County
- Length: 1.073 mi (1.727 km)
- Existed: 1957–present

== FM 2522 ==
Farm to Market Road 2522
- Location: Dimmit County
- Length: 4.953 mi (7.971 km)
- Existed: 1957–present

== RM 2523 ==
Ranch to Market Road 2523
- Location: Val Verde, Kinney, and Edwards counties
- Length: 40.459 mi (65.112 km)
- Existed: 1957–present

Ranch to Market Road 2523 (RM 2523) is located in Val Verde, Kinney, and Edwards counties.

RM 2523 begins at an intersection with US 90 in eastern Del Rio. Just north of the intersection with US 90, the highway travels through Val Verde Park and leaves the town right before an intersection with Loop 79. Outside of the Del Rio area, RM 2523 travels through largely rural areas, with the terrain becoming more hilly the farther north the highway travels. RM 2523 ends at an intersection with US 377 northeast of Carta Valley.

RM 2523 was designated on October 31, 1957, traveling from US 90 northeastward at a distance of 5.5 miles (8.9 km). The highway was extended 18.0 miles (29.0 km) northeastward on October 31, 1958. RM 2523 was extended 6.6 miles (10.6 km) northeastward on November 24, 1959. The highway was extended 4.0 miles (6.4 km) northward on September 27, 1960. RM 2523 was extended 6.5 miles (10.5 km) to US 377 on June 20, 1961.

Junction list

County	Location	mi	km	Destinations	Notes
Val Verde	Del Rio	0.0	0.0	US 90 – Del Rio, Brackettville	
Val Verde		2.1	3.4	Loop 79 – Sonora, Eagle Pass	
Kinney		18.8	30.3	RM 3008 south – Brackettville	
Edwards		40.5	65.2	US 377 – Del Rio, Rocksprings	
1.000 mi = 1.609 km; 1.000 km = 0.621 mi

== FM 2524 ==
Farm to Market Road 2524
- Location: Brown County
- Length: 5.442 mi (8.758 km)
- Existed: 1957–present

== FM 2525 ==
Farm to Market Road 2525
- Location: Brown County
- Length: 6.885 mi (11.080 km)
- Existed: 1957–present

== FM 2526 ==
Farm to Market Road 2526
- Location: Eastland County
- Length: 21.193 mi (Note: The certified length given is shorter than the actual mileage, as the TxDOT description of FM 2526 considers it to be discontinuous at rather than concurrent with US 183.) (34.107 km)
- Existed: 1957–present

Farm to Market Road 2526 (FM 2526) is located in Eastland County.

FM 2526 begins at an intersection with FM 569 at Nimrod. The highway travels in an eastern direction and intersects SH 206 and has a brief overlap with US 183. After the overlap, FM 2526 continues to travel in an eastern direction and enters the town of Carbon, where it intersects SH 6. The highway ends at an intersection with FM 2689.

FM 2526 was designated on October 31, 1957, running from US 183 near Pleasant Hill eastward to SH 6 (now Loop 389) at Carbon, at a distance of 8.7 miles (14.0 km). The highway was extended 5.3 miles (8.5 km) westward to FM 569 on October 31, 1958. FM 2526 was extended 7.6 miles (12.2 km) eastward to FM 2689 on May 6, 1964.

Junction list

The entire route is in Eastland County.

Location	mi	km	Destinations	Notes
Nimrod	0.0	0.0	FM 569	
	2.2	3.5	SH 206 – Cisco, Cross Plains	
	5.3	8.5	US 183 south – Rising Star	West end of US 183 overlap
	5.8	9.3	US 183 north – Cisco	East end of US 183 overlap
Carbon	13.9	22.4	Loop 389 south	
Carbon	14.2	22.9	SH 6 – Eastland, Gorman	
	21.7	34.9	FM 2689 – Gorman	
1.000 mi = 1.609 km; 1.000 km = 0.621 mi: Concurrency terminus

== FM 2527 ==
Farm to Market Road 2527
- Location: Lampasas County
- Length: 5.857 mi (9.426 km)
- Existed: 1957–present

Farm to Market Road 2527 (FM 2527) is located in Lampasas County.

FM 2527 begins at an intersection with FM 580 near Rumley. The highway runs in a slight northwest direction and runs parallel to the Lampasas River for its entire route. FM 2527 ends at an intersection with FM 1690.

FM 2527 was designated on October 31, 1957, running from FM 580 northwestward at a distance of 4.0 miles (6.4 km). The highway was extended to FM 1690 on October 31, 1958.

== FM 2528 ==
Farm to Market Road 2528
- Location: Lubbock and Lamb counties
- Length: 20.006 mi (Note: The certified length given is shorter than the actual mileage, as the TxDOT description of FM 2528 considers it to be discontinuous at rather than concurrent with FM 597.) (32.197 km)
- Existed: October 31, 1958–present

Farm to Market Road 2528 (FM 2528) is located in the Lubbock metropolitan area.

FM 2528 begins at Loop 289 in west Lubbock. The highway runs north along Frankford Avenue and intersects FM 2255 (4th Street) near a major retail center. Development along the highway begins to lower after an intersection with Erskine Street before leaving the city limits of Lubbock. Shortly after leaving Lubbock, FM 2528 intersects US 84 and FM 2641 shortly after that. The highway travels through sparsely populated areas of Lubbock County and overlaps with FM 597 between Anton and Abernathy. After leaving FM 597, FM 2528 enters Lamb County and ends at an intersection with FM 54 southeast of Spade.

FM 2528 was first designated on October 31, 1958, from FM 597 south to FM 1729 west of New Deal. On June 28, 1963, the highway was extended south to Loop 289 in Lubbock. On November 5, 1971, FM 2528 was extended north to FM 54, overlapping with FM 597 in the process. On June 27, 1995, the section from Loop 289 to US 84 was redesignated Urban Road 2528 (UR 2528). The designation of this section reverted to FM 2528 with the elimination of the Urban Road system on November 15, 2018.

Junction list

County	Location	mi	km	Destinations	Notes
Lubbock	Lubbock	0.0	0.0	Loop 289 (West Loop)	Interchange
Lubbock	Lubbock	0.4	0.64	FM 2255 (4th Street) – Reese Center, Texas Tech University	
Lubbock		4.0	6.4	US 84 (Clovis Road) – Littlefield, Lubbock	Interchange
Lubbock		4.4	7.1	FM 2641 – Lubbock Preston Smith International Airport	
Lubbock		7.5	12.1	FM 1294 – Shallowater	
Lubbock		10.5	16.9	FM 1729 – New Deal	
Lubbock		16.5	26.6	FM 597 east – Abernathy	South end of FM 597 overlap
Lubbock		17.5	28.2	FM 597 west – Anton	North end of FM 597 overlap
Lamb		21.1	34.0	FM 54 – Spade	
1.000 mi = 1.609 km; 1.000 km = 0.621 mi: Concurrency terminus

=== RM 2528 ===
Ranch to Market Road 2528
- Location: Culberson County
- Existed: October 31, 1957–January 1958

Ranch to Market Road 2528 (RM 2528) was designated on October 31, 1957, to run from US 80 in Kent, northward 5.0 miles (8.0 km). This route was cancelled 90 days later.

== FM 2529 ==
Farm to Market Road 2529
- Location: El Paso County
- Length: 7.855 mi (12.641 km)
- Existed: 1957–present

Farm to Market Road 2529 (FM 2529) is located in El Paso County within the city of El Paso.

FM 2529 begins at an intersection with Bus. US 54 (Dyer Street) near Fort Bliss. The highway travels in a northern direction along McCombs Street through an area of the city with a mix of residential and commercial development. North of US 54, FM 2529 travels through more rural areas of the city's north side. The highway turns west onto Stan Roberts Sr. Avenue, running one mile south of the New Mexico state line, before ending at an intersection with FM 3255 (Martin Luther King Jr. Boulevard).

FM 2529 was designated on October 31, 1957, traveling from US 54 (now Bus. US 54) northward to the El Paso Natural Gas Company compressor station at a distance of 6.6 miles (10.6 km). The highway was extended 2.0 miles (3.2 km) westward to Dona Ana Target Range Road on October 31, 1958. The section of FM 2529 between FM 2637 and FM 3255 was relocated on November 29, 1982 (the old route is now State Line Drive). On June 27, 1995, the entire route was redesignated Urban Road 2529 (UR 2529). The designation reverted to FM 2529 with the elimination of the Urban Road system on November 15, 2018.

Junction list

The entire route is in El Paso, El Paso County.

mi	km	Destinations	Notes
0.0	0.0	Bus. US 54 (Dyer Street)	
2.6	4.2	US 54 (Gateway Boulevard) – Alamogordo	
5.0	8.0	FM 2637 east	
		Spur 320 (Borderland Expressway)	
7.9	12.7	FM 3255 (Martin Luther King Jr. Boulevard)	
1.000 mi = 1.609 km; 1.000 km = 0.621 mi

== FM 2530 ==
Farm to Market Road 2530
- Location: Childress County
- Length: 7.687 mi (12.371 km)
- Existed: 1957–present

== FM 2531 ==
Farm to Market Road 2531
- Location: Collingsworth County
- Length: 2.71 mi (4.36 km)
- Existed: 1957–present

== FM 2532 ==
Farm to Market Road 2532
- Location: Cottle County
- Length: 7.619 mi (12.262 km)
- Existed: 1957–present

== FM 2533 ==
Farm to Market Road 2533
- Location: Hardeman County
- Length: 5.415 mi (8.715 km)
- Existed: 1957–present

== FM 2534 ==
Farm to Market Road 2534
- Location: Knox County
- Length: 17.629 mi (28.371 km)
- Existed: 1957–present

== FM 2535 ==
Farm to Market Road 2535
- Location: Hansford County
- Length: 13.266 mi (21.350 km)
- Existed: September 20, 1961–present

=== FM 2535 (1957) ===
Farm to Market Road 2535
- Location: Clay County
- Existed: October 31, 1957–October 30, 1960

A previous route numbered FM 2535 was designated on October 31, 1957, from US 82 near the Montague County line, north 3.9 miles (6.3 km) to a road intersection. FM 2535 was cancelled on October 30, 1960, and transferred to FM 2332.

== FM 2536 ==
Farm to Market Road 2536
- Location: Bexar County
- Length: 6.742 mi (10.850 km)
- Existed: 1958–present

Farm to Market Road 2536 (FM 2536) is located in Bexar County.

FM 2536 begins at an intersection with Loop 1604 southwest of San Antonio. The highway travels in a northeast direction through more rural areas of the county and enters San Antonio near an intersection with Nelson Road. FM 2536 continues to travel through less developed areas and runs near a large residential area of the city after a junction with I-410 / SH 16. The highway travels along the edge of Pearsall Park before ending at an intersection with Loop 13 near Lackland AFB. FM 2536 in San Antonio is known locally as Old Pearsall Road.

FM 2536 was designated on April 24, 1958, traveling from Loop 13 southwestward to FM 2173 (which has since been decommissioned). The highway's northern terminus was re-located to I-410 on July 26, 1960, with the southern terminus being re-located to a point 2.6 miles (4.2 km) southwest of I-410; FM 2536 was restored to its previous routing two months later on September 26. The highway was extended to FM 1604 (now Loop 1604) on November 3, 1972 (FM 2173 was cancelled less than a year later). On June 27, 1995, the section between I-410 and Loop 13 was redesignated Urban Road 2536 (UR 2536). This section was proposed for decommissioning in 2014 as part of TxDOT's San Antonio turnback proposal, which would have turned back over 129 miles of roads to the city of San Antonio, but the city of San Antonio rejected that proposal. The designation of this section reverted to FM 2536 with the elimination of the Urban Road system on November 15, 2018.

Junction list

The entire route is in Bexar County.

Location	mi	km	Destinations	Notes
	0.0	0.0	Loop 1604 (Anderson Loop) to I-35 / US 90	
San Antonio	3.9	6.3	I-410 (Connally Loop) / SH 16	I-410 exit 2
San Antonio	6.7	10.8	Loop 13 (SW Military Drive)	
1.000 mi = 1.609 km; 1.000 km = 0.621 mi

== FM 2537 ==
Farm to Market Road 2537
- Location: Bexar County
- Length: 1.508 mi (2.427 km)
- Existed: 1958–present

Farm to Market Road 2537 (FM 2537) is located in Bexar County.

FM 2537 begins at an intersection with Pleasanton Road south of San Antonio. The highway travels in a southeast direction through rural farm areas before ending at an intersection with US 281 near Southside High School.

FM 2537 was designated on April 24, 1958, along the current route.

== FM 2538 ==
Farm to Market Road 2538
- Location: Bexar and Guadalupe counties
- Length: 7.862 mi (12.653 km)
- Existed: 1958–present

Farm to Market Road 2538 (FM 2538) is located in Bexar and Guadalupe counties.

FM 2538 begins at a junction with I-10/US 90/SH 130 near Zuehl. The highway travels in a southeast direction near Cibolo Creek and the Zuehl city limits until an intersection with Real Rock Road, running near several farms and guest ranches. FM 2538 crosses the creek and enters New Berlin, where it ends at an intersection with FM 775.

FM 2538 was designated on April 24, 1958, running from US 90 0.7 miles (1.1 km) west of the Bexar–Guadalupe county line southeastward to Cibolo Creek at a distance of 6.7 miles (10.8 km). The highway was extended 1.6 miles (2.6 km) from Cibolo Creek to FM 775 on October 31 of that year.

== FM 2539 ==
Farm to Market Road 2539
- Location: Leon County
- Length: 1.963 mi (3.159 km)
- Existed: 1957–present

== FM 2540 ==
Farm to Market Road 2540
- Location: Matagorda County
- Length: 11.802 mi (18.993 km)
- Existed: 1958–present

== FM 2541 ==
Farm to Market Road 2541
- Location: Calhoun County
- Length: 4.628 mi (7.448 km)
- Existed: June 28, 1963–present

=== FM 2541 (1958) ===
Farm to Market Road 2541
- Location: Matagorda County
- Existed: October 31, 1958–May 29, 1962

A previous route numbered FM 2541 was designated on October 31, 1958, from FM 457 north of Sargent, northeast 3.2 miles (5.1 km) to the Brazoria County line at Cedar Lake. FM 2541 was cancelled on May 29, 1962, and transferred to FM 2611.

== FM 2542 ==
Farm to Market Road 2542
- Location: DeWitt County
- Length: 4.958 mi (7.979 km)
- Existed: 1958–present

== FM 2543 ==
Farm to Market Road 2543
- Location: Lavaca County
- Length: 3.187 mi (5.129 km)
- Existed: 1958–present

== FM 2544 ==
Farm to Market Road 2544
- Location: Houston County
- Length: 3.475 mi (5.592 km)
- Existed: January 25, 1962–present

=== FM 2544 (1958) ===
Farm to Market Road 2544
- Location: Calhoun County
- Existed: October 31, 1958–September 20, 1961

A previous route numbered FM 2544 was designated on October 31, 1958, from US 87 near Kamey northeast 3.1 miles (5.0 km) to a county road. FM 2544 was cancelled on September 20, 1961, and removed from the highway system in exchange for the creation of FM 2717.

== RM 2545 ==
Ranch to Market Road 2545
- Location: Llano County
- Length: 3.037 mi (4.888 km)
- Existed: May 7, 1970–present

=== FM 2545 (1958) ===
Farm to Market Road 2545
- Location: Victoria County
- Existed: October 31, 1958–May 25, 1962

The first use of the FM 2545 designation was in Victoria County, from FM 1686, 7 miles (11 km) northeast of Dacosta, northeast 4.4 miles (7.1 km) to a road intersection. On May 2, 1962, the road was extended northeast 2.0 miles (3.2 km) to FM 444. FM 2545 was cancelled on May 25, 1962, and transferred to FM 444.

=== FM 2545 (1963) ===
Farm to Market Road 2545
- Location: Houston County
- Existed: January 30, 1963–October 14, 1964

The second use of the FM 2545 designation was in Houston County, from SH 7 in Kennard south 5.0 miles (8.0 km) towards Pennington. FM 2545 was cancelled on October 14, 1964, and transferred to FM 2781.

=== FM 2545 (1965) ===
Farm to Market Road 2545
- Location: Tarrant County
- Existed: June 1, 1965–November 26, 1969

The third use of the FM 2545 designation was in Tarrant County, from SH 114/Spur 103 south 1.5 miles (2.4 km) to a point near a road intersection. FM 2545 was cancelled on November 26, 1969, and removed from the highway system.

== FM 2546 ==
Farm to Market Road 2546
- Location: Wharton County
- Length: 13.051 mi (21.004 km)
- Existed: October 31, 1958–present

Farm to Market Road 2546 (FM 2546) is located in Wharton County. It runs from near the Mount Pilgrim Baptist Church to SH 71 north of El Campo.

FM 2546 begins in front of Mount Pilgrim Baptist Church. From here, CR 394 continues west and CR 379 goes north. The route runs east, intersecting FM 1160 at Hahn, before passing the Hahn Cemetery. It then intersects SH 71 before passing through the community of Jones Creek. The route curves back to the southwest, intersecting FM 2765, before ending at another intersection with SH 71. The continuation of the road on the west side of SH 71 is called Sandy Corners Road.

FM 2546 was designated on October 31, 1958, beginning at FM 1160 and running approximately 4.3 miles (6.9 km) eastward to a point on SH 71 southeast of New Taiton. On May 2, 1962, the highway was extended west from FM 1160 3.5 miles (5.6 km). On May 5, 1966, FM 2546 was extended east from SH 71 a distance of about 2.4 miles (3.9 km). From this point, the highway followed 3.3 miles (5.3 km) of the former right-of-way of FM 2923 to end at SH 71 at a location 2.2 miles (3.5 km) north of the El Campo city limit. FM 2923 was canceled on May 18, 1966.

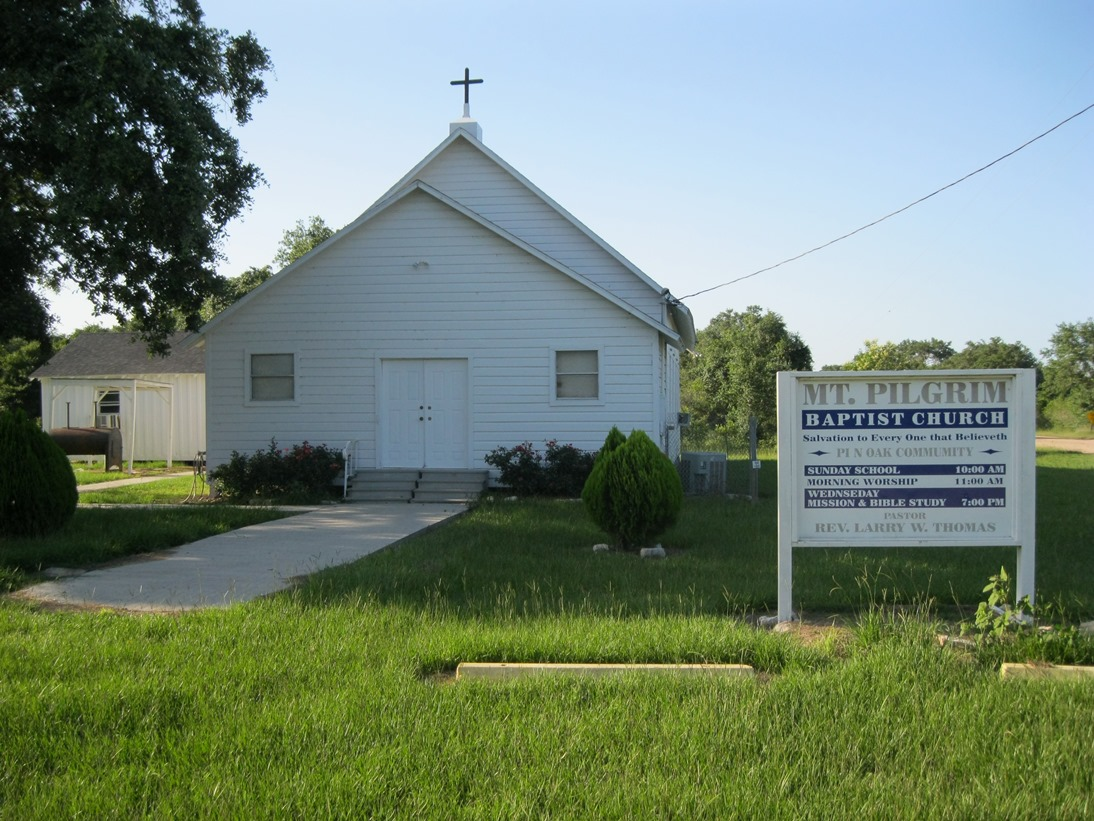
Mount Pilgrim Baptist Church

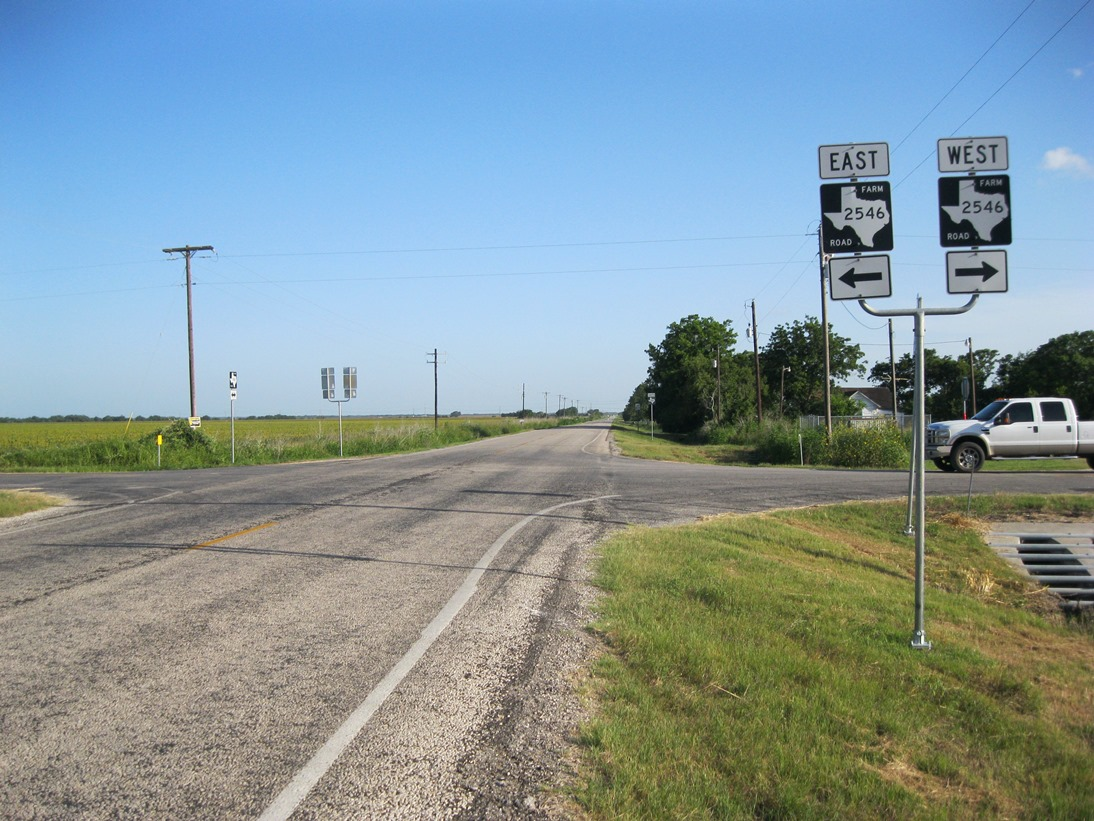
Intersection of FM 1160 and FM 2546 at Hahn

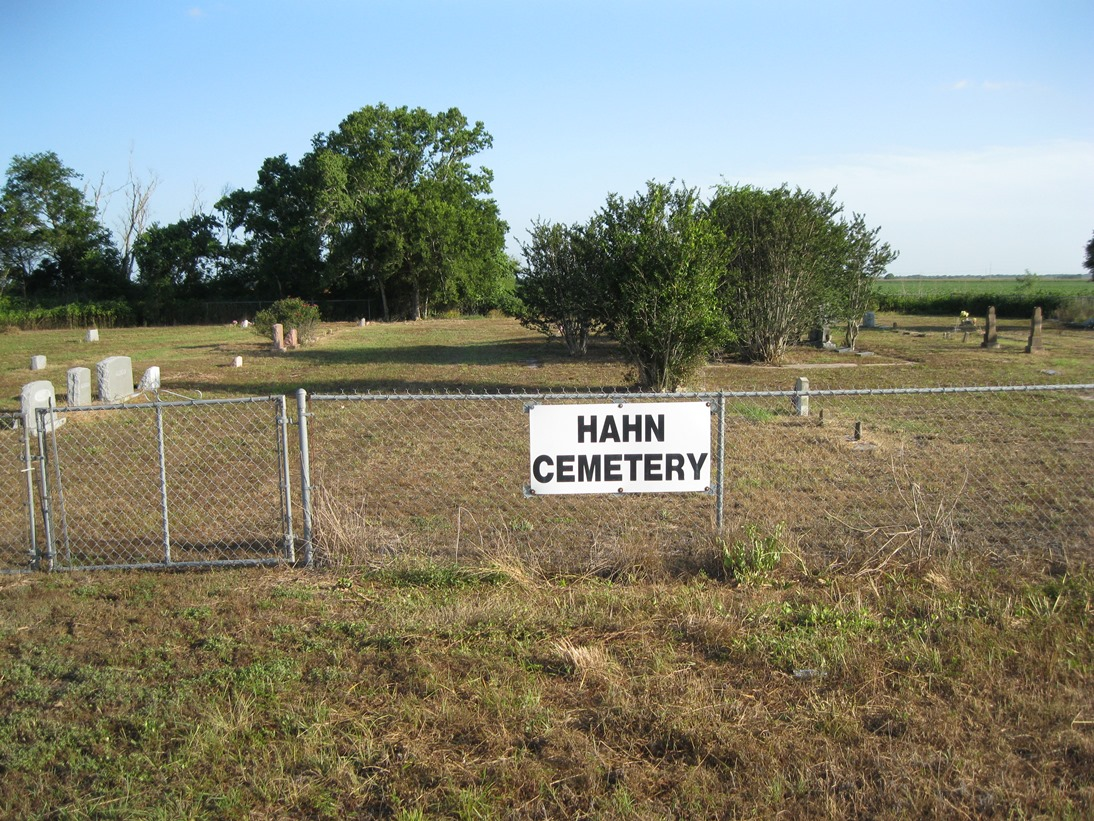
Hahn Cemetery along FM 2546

Junction list

The entire highway is in Wharton County.

Location	mi	km	Destinations	Notes
Pin Oak	0.0	0.0	County Road 394	Western terminus of FM 2546
Hahn	3.3	5.3	FM 1160 – Louise, New Taiton	
	7.5	12.1	SH 71 – El Campo, Garwood	
	12.1	19.5	FM 2765 – El Campo	Northern terminus of FM 2765
	13.1	21.1	SH 71	Eastern terminus of FM 2546
1.000 mi = 1.609 km; 1.000 km = 0.621 mi

== FM 2547 ==
Farm to Market Road 2547
- Location: Freestone County
- Length: 5.368 mi (8.639 km)
- Existed: 1958–present

== FM 2548 ==
Farm to Market Road 2548
- Location: Madison County
- Length: 6.676 mi (10.744 km)
- Existed: 1958–present

== FM 2549 ==
Farm to Market Road 2549
- Location: Robertson County
- Length: 11.742 mi (18.897 km)
- Existed: 1958–present

== FM 2550 ==
Farm to Market Road 2550
- Location: Walker County
- Length: 4.334 mi (6.975 km)
- Existed: 1958–present

== FM 2551 ==
Farm to Market Road 2551
- Location: Collin County
- Length: 4.616 mi (7.429 km)
- Existed: 1958–present

Farm to Market Road 2551 (FM 2551) is located in Collin County.

FM 2551 begins at FM 544 in Murphy. It travels north along Murphy Road into Parker, where it intersects FM 2514. The two routes are briefly concurrent along Parker Road before FM 2551 turns to the north along Dillehay Drive. The route enters Allen, where it is known as Angel Parkway, before ending at FM 2170 near the Lucas city limits.

FM 2551 was designated on December 16, 1958, traveling from FM 2170 east of Allen southward to a road intersection near Parker at a distance of 3.2 miles (5.1 km). The highway was extended 3.5 miles (5.6 km) to FM 544 in Murphy on June 25, 1962. On June 27, 1995, the entire route was redesignated Urban Road 2551 (UR 2551). The designation reverted to FM 2551 with the elimination of the Urban Road system on November 15, 2018. On February 28, 2019, the section of FM 2551 from FM 544 to the Murphy city limits border was cancelled and given to the city of Murphy.

Junction list

The entire route is in Collin County.

Location	mi	km	Destinations	Notes
Murphy	0.0	0.0	FM 544 – Plano, Wylie	
Parker	3.0	4.8	FM 2514 east (Parker Road) – Wylie	South end of FM 2514 overlap
Parker	3.4	5.5	FM 2514 west (Parker Road) – Plano	North end of FM 2514 overlap
Allen	6.6	10.6	FM 2170 east (E. Main Street)	
1.000 mi = 1.609 km; 1.000 km = 0.621 mi

== FM 2552 ==
Farm to Market Road 2552
- Location: Parker County
- Length: 2.712 mi (4.365 km)
- Existed: February 29, 1968–present

Farm to Market Road 2552 (FM 2552) is located in Parker County in Weatherford.

FM 2552 begins at a junction with I-20 and Clear Lake Road. The highway travels briefly along Clear Lake Road before traveling along Santa Fe Drive in a northwestern direction before turning west near Briarhaven Boulevard, then turns north near Park Avenue. FM 2552 turns off of Santa Fe Drive onto Jack Borden Way at an intersection. The highway travels along Jack Borden Way through the Town Creek greenbelt before ending at an intersection with US 180.

The current FM 2552 was designated on February 29, 1968, traveling from US 80 (now US 180) southeastward to I-20. The highway was rerouted onto Jack Borden Way near the town square in 2016 as part of the city's plan to alleviate vehicle traffic in the area.

=== FM 2552 (1958) ===
Farm to Market Road 2552
- Location: Bowie County
- Existed: October 31, 1958–October 3, 1966

FM 2552 was originally designated on October 31, 1958, running from US 82 west of New Boston southward to SH 98 at a distance of 3.0 miles (4.8 km). The highway was cancelled on October 3, 1966, when SH 98 was rerouted. The old route of SH 98 east of FM 1840 became part of FM 1840.

== FM 2553 ==
Farm to Market Road 2553
- Location: Harris County
- Length: 1.152 mi (1.854 km)
- Existed: July 29, 1965–present

Farm to Market Road 2553 (FM 2553) is located in Harris County in southeastern Houston.

FM 2553 begins at I-45 near the Sam Houston Tollway. The highway travels in a northeastern direction as a mostly two-lane undivided highway along Scarsdale Road. FM 2553 travels through a rural, undeveloped area of the city, before traveling near a subdivision and ending at an intersection with SH 3.

The current FM 2553 was designated on July 29, 1965, running from I-45 northeastward to SH 3. On June 27, 1995, the entire route was redesignated Urban Road 2553 (UR 2553). The designation reverted to FM 2553 with the elimination of the Urban Road system on November 15, 2018.

=== FM 2553 (1958) ===
Farm to Market Road 2553
- Location: Bowie County
- Existed: October 31, 1958–June 10, 1965

A previous route numbered FM 2553 was designated on October 31, 1958, running from FM 1840 near DeKalb southeastward to a road intersection at a distance of 6.7 miles (10.8 km). The highway was cancelled and combined with FM 990 on June 10, 1965.

== FM 2554 ==
Farm to Market Road 2554
- Location: Fannin County
- Length: 7.123 mi (11.463 km)
- Existed: November 24, 1959–present

=== FM 2554 (1958) ===
Farm to Market Road 2554
- Location: Harrison County
- Existed: October 31, 1958–1959

A previous route numbered FM 2554 was designated from FM 134 southeast of Karnack west to SH 43. FM 2554 was cancelled in 90 days later and was removed from the state highway system.

== FM 2555 ==
Farm to Market Road 2555
- Location: Navarro County
- Length: 5.228 mi (8.414 km)
- Existed: September 27, 1960–present

Farm to Market Road 2555 (FM 2555) is located in Navarro County.

FM 2555 begins at an intersection with FM 709 in the town of Retreat. The highway travels in a northwestern direction, then turns in a more northern direction at Oak Valley. FM 2555 enters Corsicana near an intersection with Oak Valley Road then intersects SH 31 near a commercial area. The highway intersects FM 744 near Corsicana High School before ending at an intersection with SH 22. The section of FM 2555 within Corsicana is known locally as 45th Street.

The current FM 2555 was designated on September 27, 1960, running from SH 31 northwestward to SH 22 at a distance of 1.7 miles (2.7 km). The highway was extended 3.4 miles (5.5 km) southward to FM 709 on October 21, 1981.

Junction list

The entire route is in Navarro County.

Location	mi	km	Destinations	Notes
Retreat	0.0	0.0	FM 709 – Dawson, Corsicana	
Corsicana	3.6	5.8	SH 31 (7th Avenue) – Waco, Corsicana	
Corsicana	5.0	8.0	FM 744	
Corsicana	5.2	8.4	SH 22 – Barry, Corsicana	
1.000 mi = 1.609 km; 1.000 km = 0.621 mi

=== FM 2555 (1958) ===
Farm to Market Road 2555
- Location: Liberty County
- Existed: October 31, 1958–December 18, 1959

A previous route numbered FM 2555 was designated on October 31, 1958, running from SH 146 northeast of Liberty, northward to a county road at a distance of 5.3 miles (8.5 km). The highway was cancelled on December 18, 1959, with the mileage being transferred to FM 1011.

== FM 2556 ==
Farm to Market Road 2556
- Location: Cameron County
- Length: 16.94 mi (27.26 km)
- Existed: 1958–present

== FM 2557 ==
Farm to Market Road 2557
- Location: Hidalgo County
- Length: 7.347 mi (11.824 km)
- Existed: October 18, 1967–present

=== FM 2557 (1958) ===
Farm to Market Road 2557
- Location: Zavala County
- Existed: October 31, 1958–June 21, 1967

A previous route numbered FM 2557 was designated on October 31, 1958, from FM 394 (now US 57), 1 mile (1.6 km) east of Batesville, to a point 5.0 miles (8.0 km) northeast. FM 2557 was cancelled on June 21, 1967, and became a portion of RM 187.

== FM 2558 ==
Farm to Market Road 2558
- Location: San Augustine County
- Length: 3.25 mi (5.23 km)
- Existed: February 22, 1961–present

=== FM 2558 (1958) ===
Farm to Market Road 2558
- Location: Dimmit County
- Existed: October 31, 1958–January 31, 1961

A previous route numbered FM 2558 was designated on October 31, 1958, from SH 85, 7 miles (11 km) east of Carrizo Springs, southeast 5.8 miles (9.3 km) to FM 190. FM 2558 was cancelled on January 31, 1961, and removed from the highway system by request of court officials in exchange for extending FM 2688.

== FM 2559 ==
Farm to Market Road 2559
- Location: Brown County
- Length: 4.977 mi (8.010 km)
- Existed: 1958–present

== FM 2560 ==
Farm to Market Road 2560
- Location: Hopkins County
- Length: 5.359 mi (8.624 km)
- Existed: June 28, 1963–present

=== FM 2560 (1958) ===
Farm to Market Road 2560
- Location: Coleman County
- Existed: October 31, 1958–May 24, 1962

A previous route numbered FM 2560 was designated on October 31, 1958, from SH 206, 1 mile (1.6 km) east of Echo, east 6.3 miles (10.1 km) to the Brown County line. FM 2560 was cancelled on May 24, 1962, and transferred to FM 585.

== FM 2561 ==
Farm to Market Road 2561
- Location: Comanche County
- Length: 8.637 mi (13.900 km)
- Existed: 1958–present

== FM 2562 ==
Farm to Market Road 2562
- Location: Grimes County
- Length: 6.727 mi (10.826 km)
- Existed: May 7, 1970–present

=== FM 2562 (1958) ===
Farm to Market Road 2562
- Location: Childress County
- Existed: October 31, 1958–February 20, 1970

A previous route numbered FM 2562 was designated on October 31, 1958, from FM 268, 1.1 miles (1.8 km) north of US 287, to a point 3.0 miles (4.8 km). FM 2562 was cancelled on February 20, 1970, and became a portion of FM 2530.

== FM 2563 ==
Farm to Market Road 2563
- Location: Eastland County
- Length: 10.366 mi (16.682 km)
- Existed: 1958–present

== FM 2564 ==
Farm to Market Road 2564
- Location: Cottle County
- Length: 2.049 mi (3.298 km)
- Existed: 1958–present

== FM 2565 ==
Farm to Market Road 2565
- Location: Dickens County
- Length: 4.583 mi (7.376 km)
- Existed: 1958–present

== FM 2566 ==
Farm to Market Road 2566
- Location: Foard County
- Length: 4.034 mi (6.492 km)
- Existed: 1958–present

== FM 2567 ==
Farm to Market Road 2567
- Location: Castro County
- Length: 5.074 mi (8.166 km)
- Existed: May 2, 1962–present

=== FM 2567 (1958) ===
Farm to Market Road 2567
- Location: Hardeman County
- Existed: October 31, 1958–October 9, 1961

A previous route numbered FM 2567 was designated on October 31, 1958, from a point 1.5 miles (2.4 km) south of US 287 and 2 miles (3.2 km) east of the Childress County line to a point 5.5 miles (8.9 km) north. FM 2567 was cancelled on October 9, 1961, and transferred to FM 268.

== FM 2568 ==
Farm to Market Road 2568
- Location: Hardeman County
- Length: 7.043 mi (11.335 km)
- Existed: 1958–present

== FM 2569 ==
Farm to Market Road 2569
- Location: King County
- Length: 1.764 mi (2.839 km)
- Existed: 1958–present

== FM 2570 ==
Farm to Market Road 2570
- Location: Freestone County
- Length: 8.004 mi (12.881 km)
- Existed: April 1, 1968–present

=== FM 2570 (1958) ===
Farm to Market Road 2570
- Location: Knox County
- Existed: October 31, 1958–June 21, 1967

A previous route numbered FM 2570 was designated on October 31, 1958, from SH 283, 1 mile (1.6 km) south of the Brazos River, east 6.2 miles (10.0 km) to a road intersection. FM 2570 was cancelled on June 21, 1967, and became a portion of FM 2534.

== FM 2571 ==
Farm to Market Road 2571
- Location: Bastrop County
- Length: 9.641 mi (15.516 km)
- Existed: September 27, 1960–present

=== RM 2571 ===
Ranch to Market Road 2571
- Location: Gray County
- Existed: October 31, 1958–December 11, 1959

== FM 2572 ==
Farm to Market Road 2572
- Location: Shelby County
- Length: 1.659 mi (2.670 km)
- Existed: January 31, 1969–present

=== FM 2572 (1958) ===
Farm to Market Road 2572
- Location: Waller County
- Existed: October 31, 1958–September 11, 1968

A previous route numbered FM 2572 was designated on October 31, 1958, from FM 359 at Pattison west 6.8 miles (10.9 km) to the Brazos River. FM 2572 was cancelled on September 11, 1968, and became a portion of FM 1458.

== FM 2573 ==
Farm to Market Road 2573
- Location: Red River County
- Length: 8.715 mi (14.025 km)
- Existed: 1958–present

== FM 2574 ==
Farm to Market Road 2574
- Location: Anderson County
- Length: 5.25 mi (8.45 km)
- Existed: 1958–present

== FM 2575 ==
Farm to Market Road 2575
- Location: Potter and Carson counties
- Length: 3.208 mi (5.163 km)
- Existed: December 19, 1958–present

Farm to Market Road 2575 (FM 2575) is located in the Amarillo area.

FM 2575 runs along SE 8th Avenue east of Amarillo. The western terminus is in Potter County at FM 1912. The eastern terminus is in Carson County at a junction with I-40 and Business I-40.

FM 2575 was designated on December 19, 1958, on its current route. Prior to the building of Amarillo International Airport, the roadway was an alignment of US 66.

== FM 2576 ==
Farm to Market Road 2576
- Location: Crosby County
- Length: 5.21 mi (8.38 km)
- Existed: May 2, 1962–present

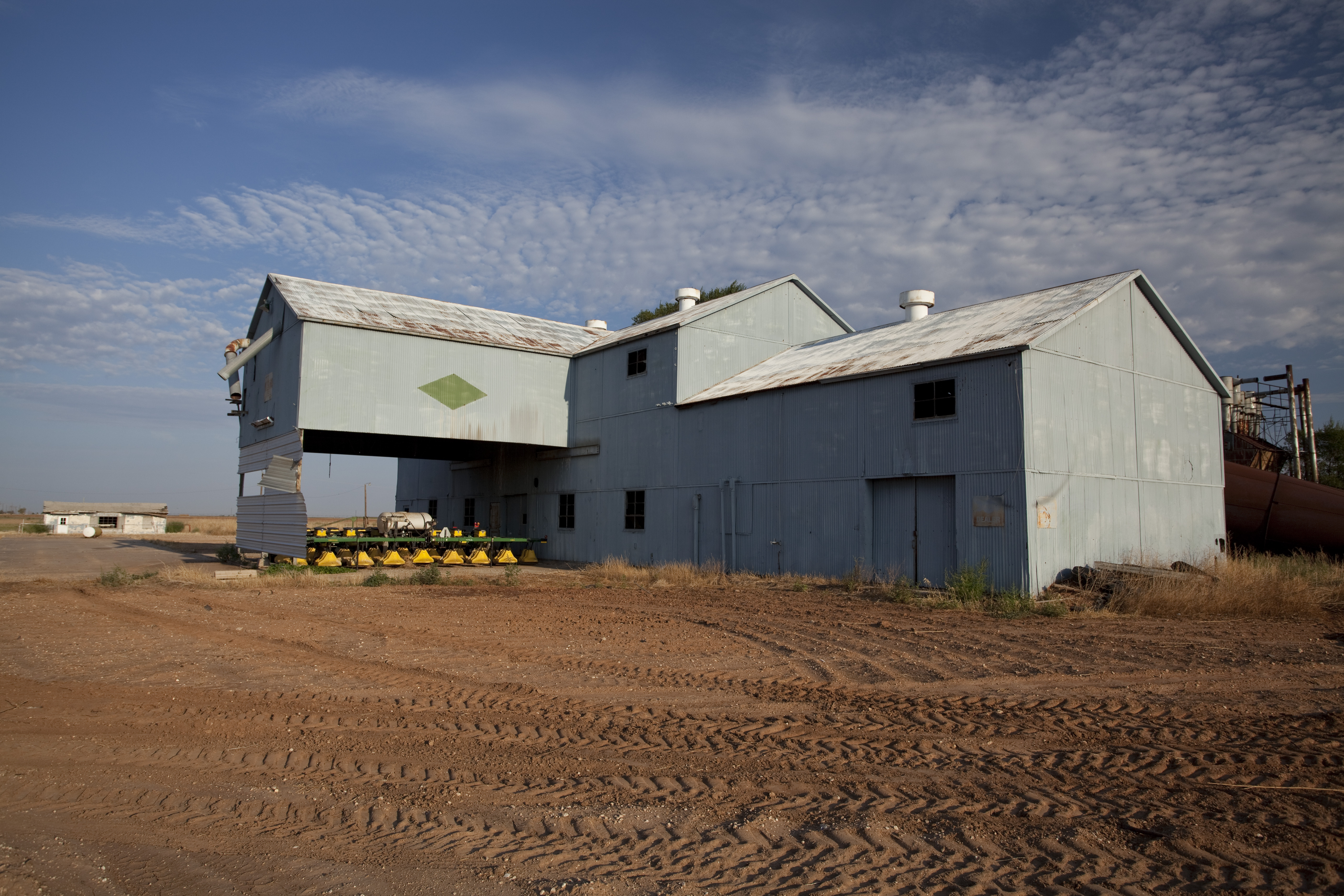
Abandoned cotton gin at the corner of FM 40 and FM 2576 in Savage

Farm to Market Road 2576 (FM 2576) is located in Crosby County.

The southern terminus of FM 2576 is at an intersection with FM 40 near the unincorporated community of Savage. The northern terminus is 5.2 miles (8.4 km) to the north, at an intersection with US 62/US 82/SH 114 west of Ralls.

The current designation was established on May 2, 1962.

=== FM 2576 (1958) ===
Farm to Market Road 2576
- Location: Jasper County
- Existed: December 19, 1958–October 16, 1961

A previous route designed FM 2576 was designated in Jasper County on December 19, 1958, southward 3.5 miles (5.6 km) from an intersection with FM 105. On November 24, 1959, the route was extended southward 2.4 miles (3.9 km). This route became a part of FM 1131 on October 16, 1961.

== FM 2577 ==
Farm to Market Road 2577
- Location: Hartley County
- Length: 6.894 mi (11.095 km)
- Existed: 1958–present

== FM 2578 ==
Farm to Market Road 2578
- Location: Kaufman County
- Length: 11.173 mi (17.981 km)
- Existed: 1958–present

== FM 2579 ==
Farm to Market Road 2579
- Location: Wilson County
- Length: 8.531 mi (13.729 km)
- Existed: 1958–present

== FM 2580 ==
Farm to Market Road 2580
- Location: Parker and Hood counties
- Length: 10.343 mi (16.645 km)
- Existed: 1959–present

== FM 2581 ==
Farm to Market Road 2581
- Location: Archer County
- Length: 11.118 mi (17.893 km)
- Existed: 1959–present

== FM 2582 ==
Farm to Market Road 2582
- Location: Baylor County
- Length: 3.865 mi (6.220 km)
- Existed: 1959–present

== FM 2583 ==
Farm to Market Road 2583
- Location: Montague County
- Length: 3.588 mi (5.774 km)
- Existed: 1959–present

== FM 2584 ==
Farm to Market Road 2584
- Location: Throckmorton County
- Length: 2.081 mi (3.349 km)
- Existed: 1959–present

== FM 2585 ==
Farm to Market Road 2585
- Location: Wilbarger County
- Length: 6.246 mi (10.052 km)
- Existed: 1959–present

== FM 2586 ==
Farm to Market Road 2586
- Location: Dallam County
- Length: 7.782 mi (12.524 km)
- Existed: 1959–present

Farm to Market Road 2586 (FM 2586) is located in Dallam County. Its southern terminus is at FM 296, approximately 7 miles (11 km) east of Texline. It runs northward, passing west of the Rita Blanca National Grassland, to the Oklahoma state line. The roadway continues under Cimarron County maintenance to US 412.

FM 2586 was designated on November 24, 1959, from FM 296 northward 3.5 miles (5.6 km). It was extended to the Oklahoma state line on February 5, 1960.

== FM 2587 ==
Farm to Market Road 2587
- Location: Deaf Smith County
- Length: 25.766 mi (41.466 km)
- Existed: 1959–present

== RM 2588 ==
Ranch to Market Road 2588
- Location: Henderson County
- Length: 4.306 mi (6.930 km)
- Existed: January 12, 1961–present

Ranch to Market Road 2588 (RM 2588) is located in Henderson County.

The RM 2588 designation begins in southern Henderson County, just north of the Anderson County line. The roadway travels north to an intersection with US 175 near LaRue.

The current RM 2588 was designated on January 12, 1961.

=== FM 2588 ===
Farm to Market Road 2588
- Location: Lipscomb County
- Existed: November 24, 1959–December 5, 1960

A previous route designated Farm to Market Road 2588 (FM 2588) was located in Lipscomb County. It was established on November 24, 1959, from SH 305 near Lipscomb, westward 3.5 miles (5.6 km). The route was cancelled on December 5, 1960, and its mileage was transferred to FM 1920.

== FM 2589 ==
Farm to Market Road 2589
- Location: Moore County
- Length: 3.251 mi (5.232 km)
- Existed: 1959–present

== FM 2590 ==
Farm to Market Road 2590
- Location: Randall County
- Length: 9.413 mi (15.149 km)
- Existed: 1959–present

== FM 2591 ==
Farm to Market Road 2591
- Location: Crosby County
- Length: 5.518 mi (8.880 km)
- Existed: 1959–present

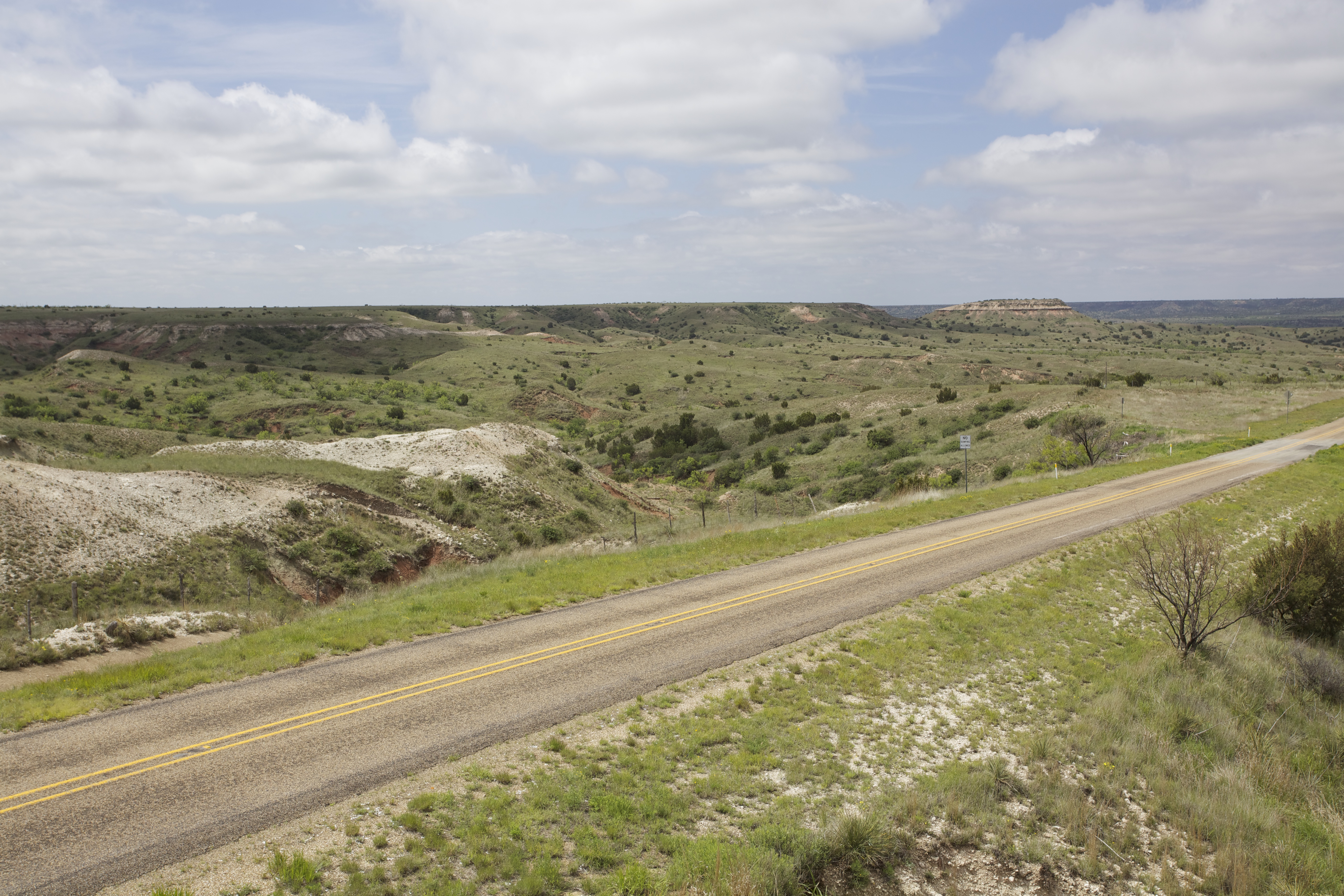
FM 2591 passing through Blanco Canyon

Farm to Market Road 2591 (FM 2591) passes through Blanco Canyon in Crosby County.

The southern terminus of FM 2591 is at an intersection with US 82/SH 114, approximately 3.4 mi (5.5 km) east of Crosbyton. The northern terminus is 5.7 miles (9.2 km) to the north, at an intersection with County Road 140.

FM 2591 was designated on November 24, 1959, on its current route.

== FM 2592 ==
Farm to Market Road 2592
- Location: Dawson County
- Length: 1.114 mi (1.793 km)
- Existed: 1959–present

== RM 2593 ==
Ranch to Market Road 2593
- Location: Pecos County
- Length: 5.407 mi (8.702 km)
- Existed: 1959–present

Ranch to Market Road 2593 (RM 2593) is located in northern Pecos County.

RM 2593 begins at FM 1450 approximately 3.3 miles (5.3 km) east of SH 18. The route proceeds north following the eastern shore of Imperial Reservoir. It then curves to the northwest along the northern shore of the reservoir and continues on a path parallel to the nearby Pecos River. The road ends at SH 18 approximately 0.7 miles (1.1 km) south of the river.

RM 2593 was designated on November 24, 1959, along its current route.

== RM 2594 ==
Ranch to Market Road 2594
- Location: Upton County
- Length: 14.698 mi (23.654 km)
- Existed: 1959–present

== FM 2595 ==
Farm to Market Road 2595
- Location: Runnels County
- Length: 7.75 mi (12.47 km)
- Existed: 1959–present

== RM 2596 ==
Ranch to Market Road 2596
- Location: Schleicher and Sutton counties
- Length: 25.14 mi (40.46 km)
- Existed: 1959–present

== RM 2597 ==
Ranch to Market Road 2597
- Location: Sutton County
- Length: 5.086 mi (8.185 km)
- Existed: 1959–present

== FM 2598 ==
Farm to Market Road 2598
- Location: Fisher County
- Length: 3.013 mi (4.849 km)
- Existed: 1959–present

== FM 2599 ==
Farm to Market Road 2599
- Location: Howard County
- Length: 4.4 mi (7.1 km)
- Existed: 1959–present
