= Danzell =

Danzell is a given name. Notable people with the name include:

- Danzell Gravenberch (born 1994), Dutch footballer
- Danzell Lee (born 1963), American football player
