= Louis Vasquez (American football) =

American football player (born 1987)

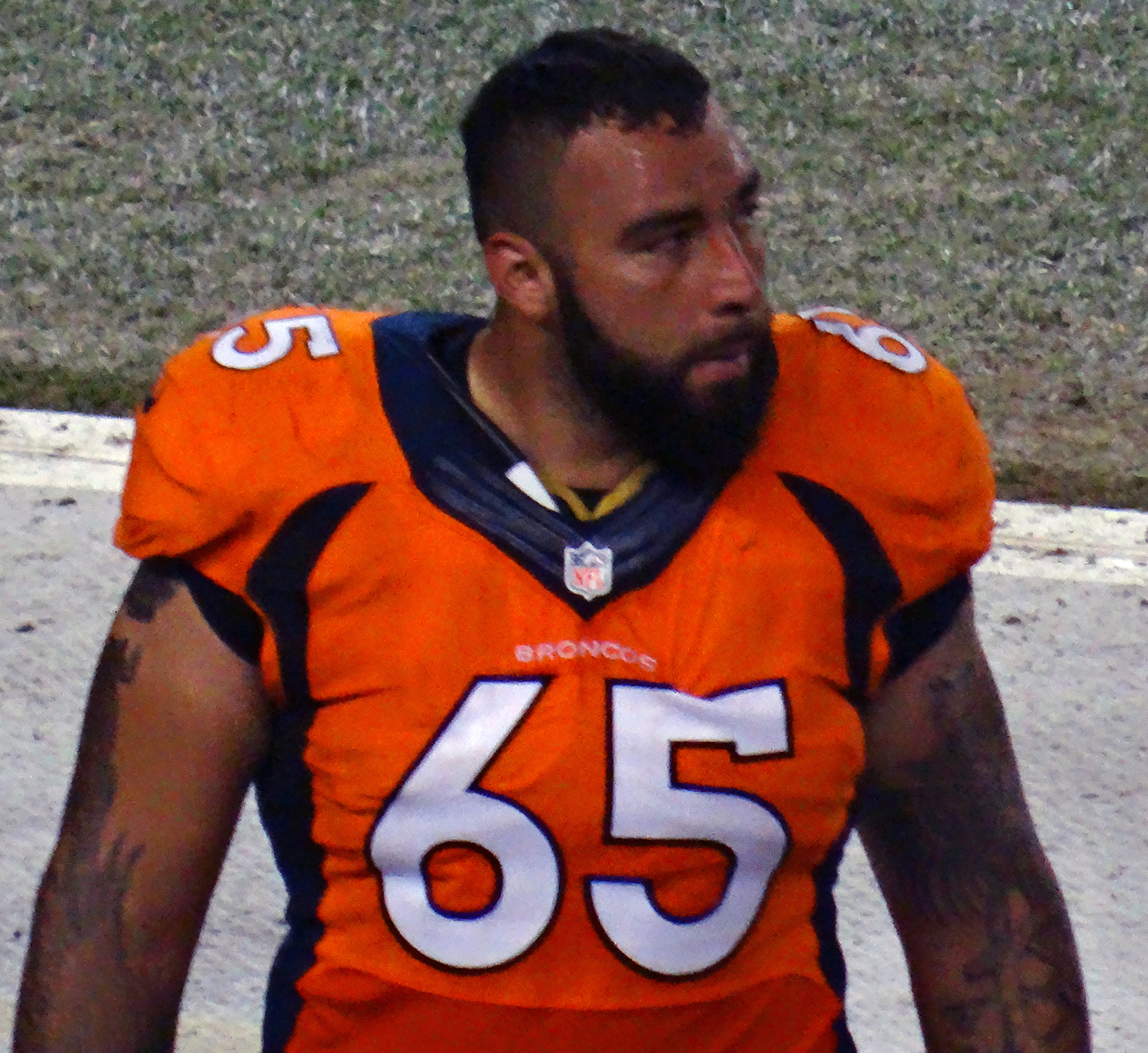
- Vasquez with the Denver Broncos in 2013

No. 65
- Position: Guard

Personal information
- Born: April 11, 1987 (age 39); Corsicana, Texas, U.S.
- Listed height: 6 ft 5 in (1.96 m)
- Listed weight: 335 lb (152 kg)

Career information
- High school: Corsicana
- College: Texas Tech (2005–2008)
- NFL draft: 2009: 3rd round, 78th overall pick

Career history
- San Diego Chargers (2009–2012); Denver Broncos (2013–2015)

Awards and highlights
- Super Bowl champion (50); First-team All-Pro (2013); Pro Bowl (2013); PFWA All-Rookie Team (2009); Second-team All-Big 12 (2008)

Career NFL statistics
- Games played: 102
- Games started: 101
- Fumble recoveries: 1
- Stats at Pro Football Reference

Louis Nicholas Vasquez (born April 11, 1987) is an American former professional football player who was a guard in the National Football League (NFL). He played college football for the Texas Tech Red Raiders, and was selected by the San Diego Chargers in the third round of the 2009 NFL draft. He also played for the Denver Broncos.

== Early life ==
Vasquez is of Mexican American descent. He attended Corsicana High School in Corsicana, Texas, a rural town located approx. 60 miles southeast of Dallas.

== College career ==
=== College awards and honors ===
- 2007 All-Big 12 honorable mention
- 2008 All-Big 12 second-team
- 2008 Rivals.com second-team All-American
- 2008 Associated Press third-team All-American

== Professional career ==
=== San Diego Chargers ===
At the 2009 NFL Combine, Vasquez bench pressed 225 pounds 39 times. His 39 repetitions were the highest of any participant at the combine. Vasquez was drafted in the third round (78th overall) by the San Diego Chargers.

During the Chargers' training camp, Vasquez competed for the right guard starting position with veteran Kynan Forney. Vasquez won the job, and Forney (who was dealing with a neck injury at the time) was later released from the team. Vasquez became the sole rookie in the starting lineup. He was named to the PFWA All-Rookie Team. He remained at right guard during his tenure with San Diego.

=== Denver Broncos ===
Vasquez signed a four-year contract with the Denver Broncos on March 12, 2013.

Vasquez was selected to be in the 2014 Pro Bowl after not allowing a single sack in 2013 while helping Peyton Manning set the NFL single-season record with 55 touchdown passes. He earned first team All-Pro honors. Vasquez could not play due to the Broncos’ appearance in Super Bowl XLVIII. He was ranked 97th by his fellow players on the NFL Top 100 Players of 2014. On February 7, 2016, Vasquez was part of the Broncos team that won Super Bowl 50. In the game, the Broncos defeated the Carolina Panthers by a score of 24–10.

Vasquez was released by the team on March 8, 2016.

After Vasquez's release, The Denver Post published a story that explained, "Vasquez, 28, was the Broncos' starter at right guard for the past three seasons. He was released to save the team salary cap space. The Broncos did not approach him about restructuring his contract. Vasquez was an All-Pro in 2013, but over the past two seasons, struggled with nagging injuries and shifting positions. His power blocking prowess was not a great fit in Broncos coach Gary Kubiak's zone blocking scheme."
