= Hahn, Texas =

- Unincorporated community
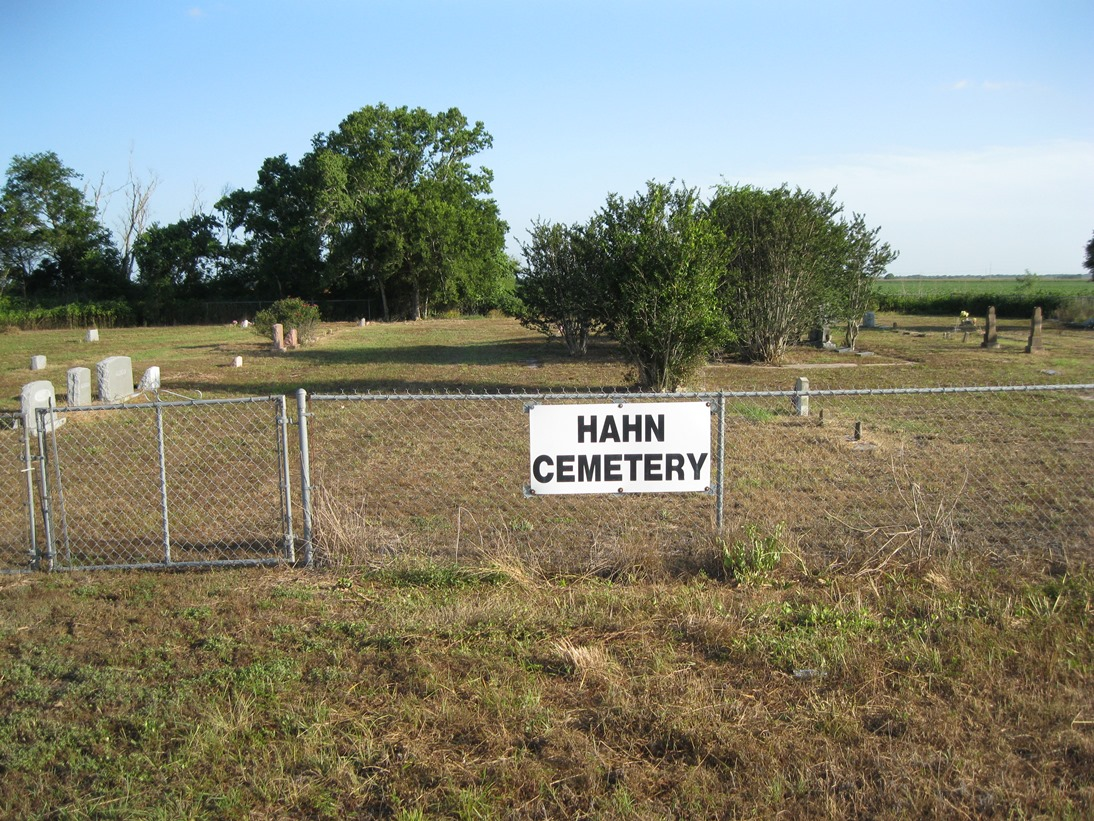
- Hahn Cemetery is on FM 2546 to the east of FM 1160.

- Location within the state of Texas Hahn, Texas (the United States)
- Coordinates: 29°16′53″N 96°23′49″W
- Country: United States
- State: Texas
- County: Wharton
- Elevation: 128 ft (39 m)
- Time zone: UTC-6 (Central (CST))
  - Summer (DST): UTC-5 (CDT)
- ZIP code: 77437
- Area code: 979
- GNIS feature ID: 1379876

Hahn or Hahn Prairie is an unincorporated community in northwestern Wharton County, in the U.S. state of Texas. The tiny community is located at the intersection of Farm to Market Road 1160 (FM 1160) and Farm to Market Road 2546, (FM 2546) northwest of El Campo. There are no road signs identifying the site, but the nearby Hahn Cemetery is marked and there is a small cluster of homes around the junction. The surrounding farmland is dotted by a number of natural gas wells.

== History ==
The Handbook of Texas article writes of Hahn Prairie in the past tense. Hahn Prairie was located on the old Hahn Ranch, 16 miles (25.7 km) northwest of Wharton in northwestern Wharton County. A post office was established in the settlement in 1897. By 1905, the school reported two teachers and 32 students. Five years later, 50 persons lived in Hahn. The post office closed in 1929. By 1933, only 20 souls lived in the community and there was only one store. The community center was abandoned in the 1940s. State highway maps identified Hahn Prairie as late as 1989. By that time only the school, cemetery and a few homes remained.

== Geography ==
The 1965 USGS Hahn Quadrangle map placed Hahn at the intersection of north-south FM 1160 and east-west FM 2546. In that year, only a handful of buildings were recorded on the map near the town site. Hahn is 12.2 miles (19.6 km) north of Louise and 6.3 miles (10.1 km) southwest of New Taiton on FM 1160. The Hahn crossroads is 4.2 miles (6.8 km) west of State Highway 71 and 3.3 miles (5.3 km) east of Mount Pilgrim Baptist Church on FM 2546. The Hahn Cemetery is 0.7 miles (1.1 km) east on FM 2546. Perhaps a dozen homes are bunched near the junction. West Mustang Creek flows south to the east of Hahn, while Porter's Creek flows south to the west of the community. There are no road signs identifying the site, but the nearby Hahn Cemetery is marked. There are at least 15 gas leases and one oil lease in the vicinity of Hahn.

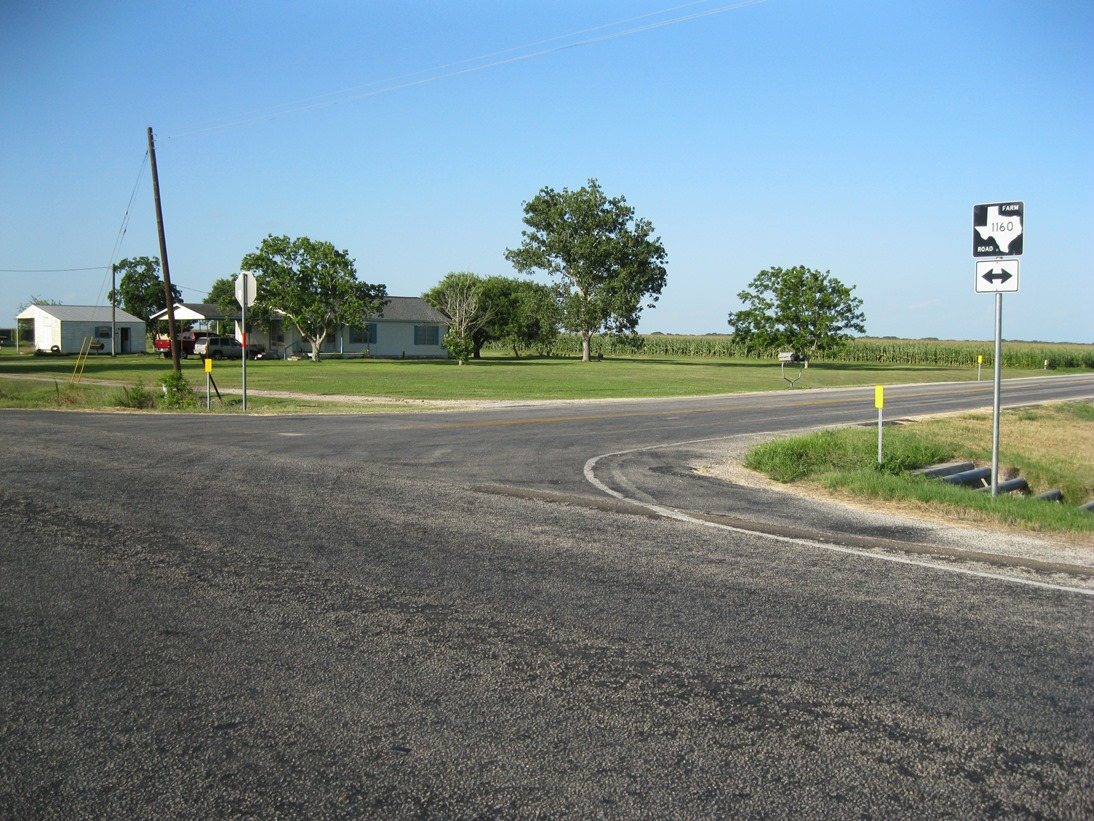
Hahn

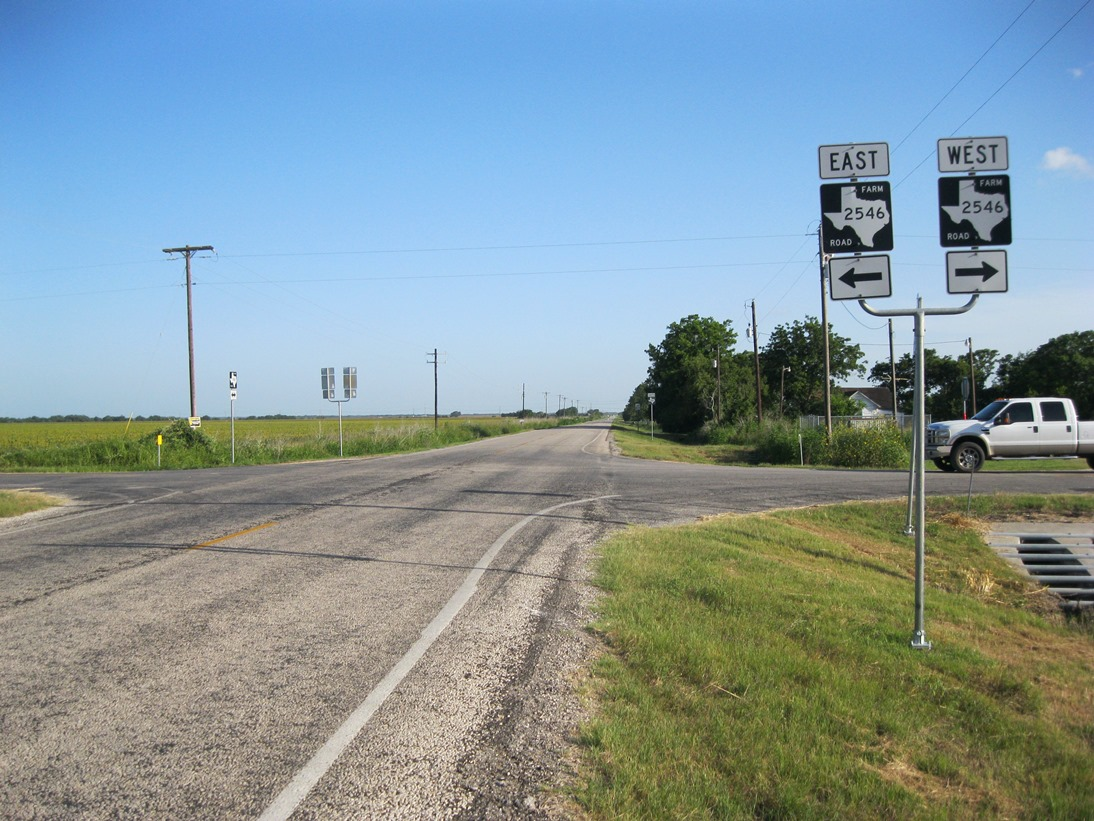
Hahn

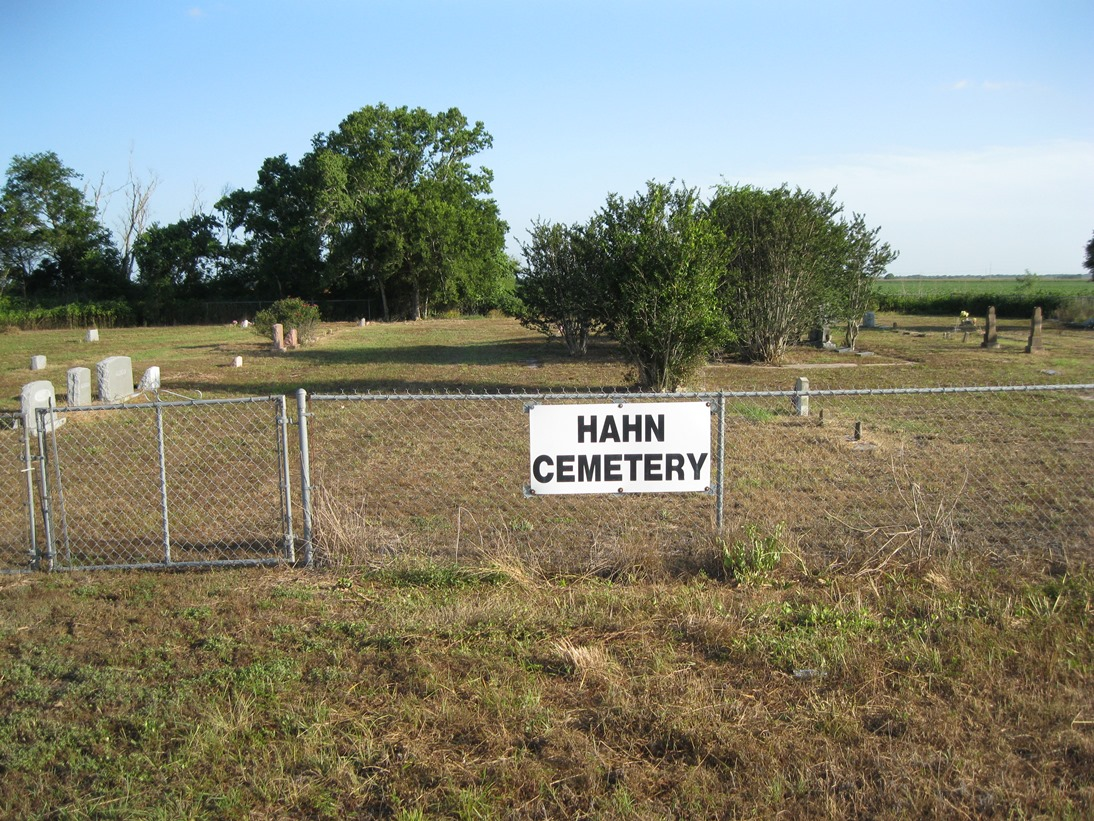
Hahn Cemetery
