= Farm to Market Road 1160 =

Road in Texas, United States

Farm to Market Road 1160

Route information
- Maintained by TxDOT
- Length: 18.402 mi (29.615 km)
- Existed: February 25, 1949–present

Major junctions
- South end: Loop 523 at Louise
- Future I-69 / US 59 at Louise; FM 1300; FM 2546 at Hahn
- North end: SH 71 near New Taiton

Location
- Country: United States
- State: Texas
- Counties: Wharton

Highway system
- Highways in Texas; Interstate; US; State; Former; Toll; Loops; Spurs; FM/RM; Park; Rec
← FM 1159	→ FM 1161

Farm to Market Road 1160 (FM 1160) is a farm-to-market road in Wharton County in the U.S. state of Texas. The highway starts at State Highway Loop 523 (Loop 523) in Louise, intersects with Future Interstate 69/U.S. Route 59 outside Louise and continues in a northerly direction for most of its length. Before its end at State Highway 71 (SH 71) near New Taiton, the highway turns directly to the east.

== Route description ==
FM 1160 starts at Loop 523 in Louise and heads north. Loop 523 is also called North Street. The road that extends to the southeast across the Union Pacific Railroad is named Wharton Street. After going north for 0.6 miles (1.0 km) through a residential area, FM 1160 crosses Future I-69/US 59 by an overpass. Access is allowed in all directions between FM 1160 and Future I-69/US 59 via entrance and exit ramps. North of Louise, FM 1160 turns sharply east for a short distance before continuing north again. Between Future I-69/US 59 and westbound FM 1300 is a distance of 8.0 miles (12.9 km). For 0.3 miles (0.5 km) FM 1160 and FM 1300 share the right-of-way before coming to a junction where FM 1300 heads to the east. From this junction to the crossroads with FM 2546 at Hahn is 3.2 miles (5.1 km). From Hahn to the end of FM 1160 at SH 71 north of New Taiton is 6.4 miles (10.3 km). In its final stretch, the highway goes north 3.6 miles (5.8 km) before turning sharply east for 2.8 miles (4.5 km). The Raum Rice Dryer is a prominent landmark in the last leg of FM 1160 according to the 1965 USGS Hahn Quadrangle map.

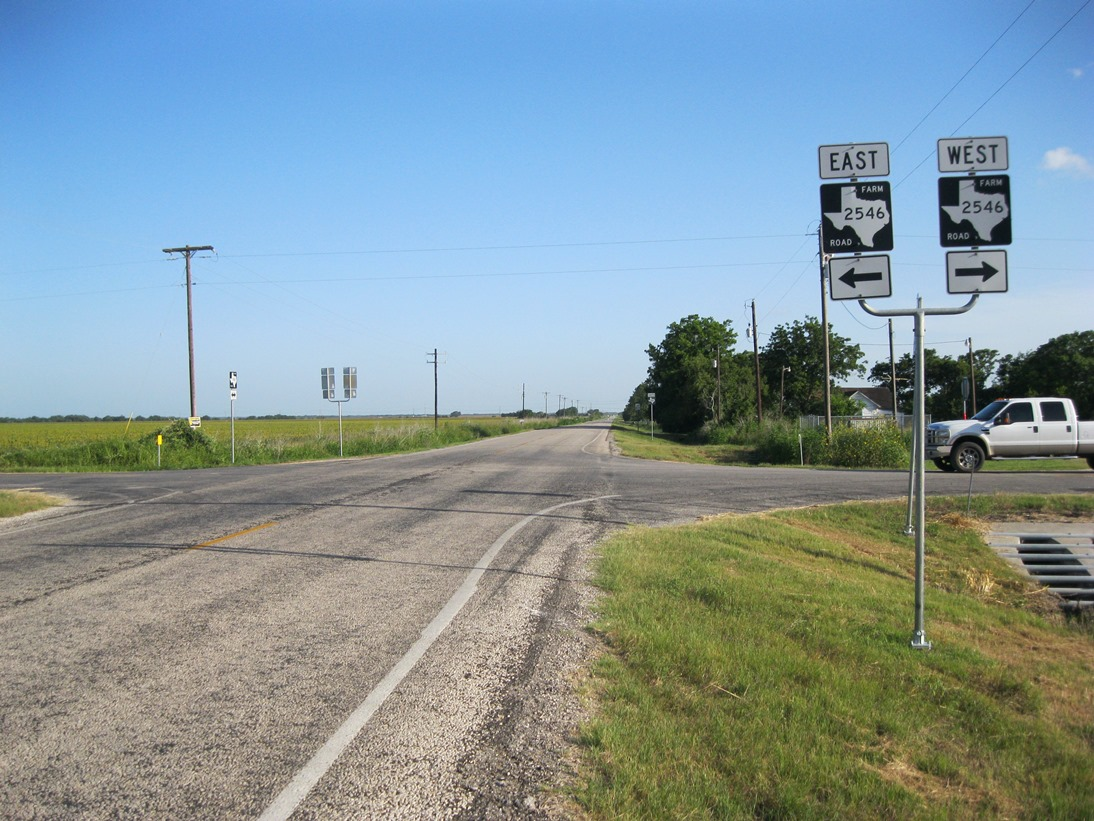
FM 1160 goes south toward Louise from the FM 2546 crossroads at Hahn, shown here.

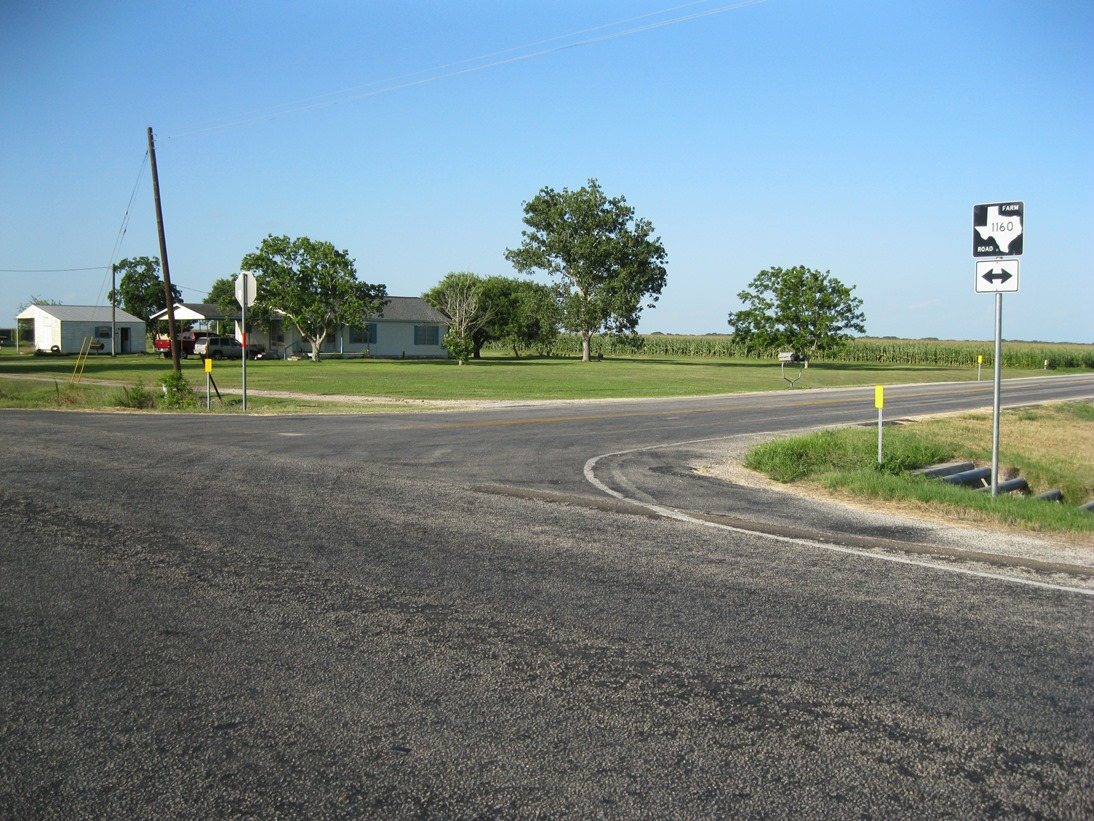
This is another view of the Hahn junction, looking northeast at the FM 1160 sign.

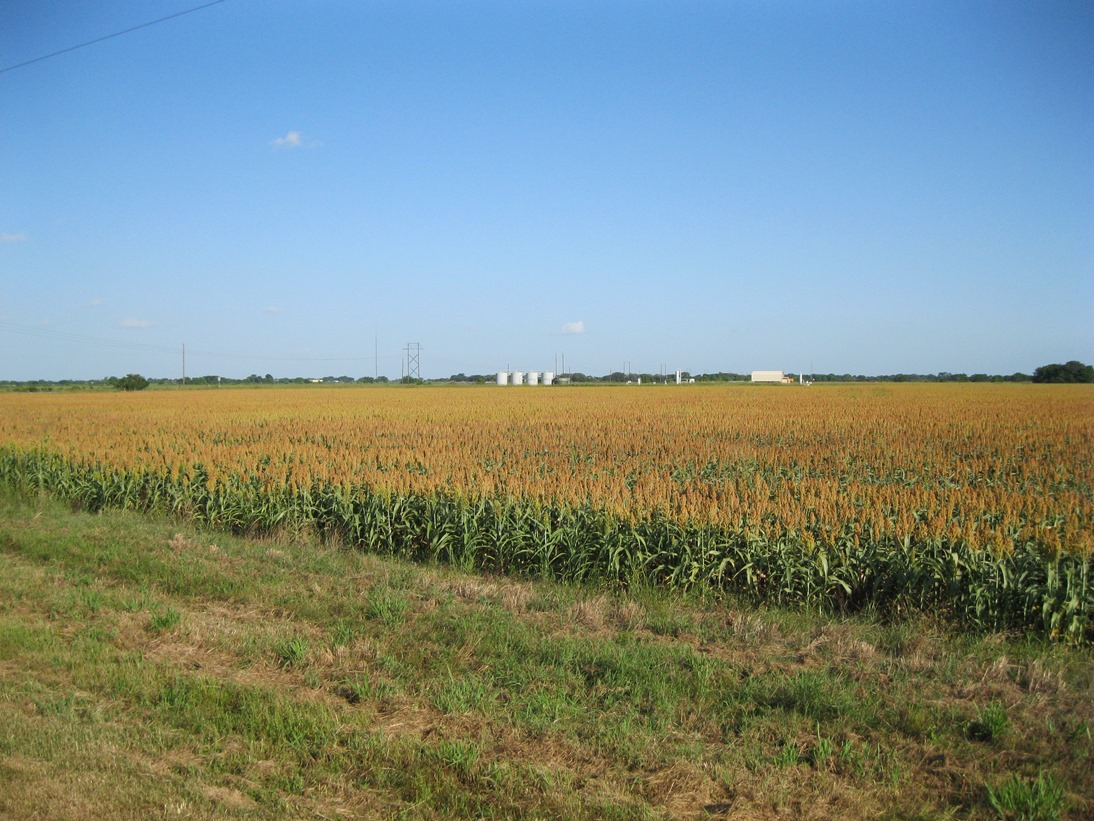
View shows a cornfield on FM 1160 near Hwy 71 near New Taiton. The four distant white tanks are an oil or gas well.

== History ==
FM 1160 was originally designated on February 25, 1949 to start at US 59 in Louise and run northward approximately 9.3 miles (15.0 km) and then eastward about 3.5 miles (5.6 km) to SH 71 north of El Campo. On October 5, 1953, the section of FM 1160 east of FM 2092 was canceled and transferred to FM 1300. FM 2092 was transferred to FM 1160. After the change, FM 1160 started at Louise and went north about 14.7 miles (23.7 km) to a county road. On September 29, 1954 the northern section connecting the highway to SH 71 was added. On December 15, 1954 the description was changed to better describe the 4.2 miles (6.8 km) extension that connected the northern end to SH 71.

== Major intersections ==
The entire highway is in Wharton County.

Location	mi	km	Destinations	Notes
Louise	0.0	0.0	Loop 523	Southern terminus of FM 1160
Louise	0.6	0.97	Future I-69 / US 59 – Ganado, El Campo, Houston	I-69 exit 49; U.S. 59 is the future Interstate 69
	8.6	13.8	FM 1300	Start of FM 1300 concurrency
	8.9	14.3	FM 1300 to SH 71 – El Campo	End of FM 1300 concurrency
Hahn	12.1	19.5	FM 2546	
New Taiton	18.5	29.8	SH 71 – El Campo, Garwood	Northern terminus of FM 1160
1.000 mi = 1.609 km; 1.000 km = 0.621 mi
