= Danzell Lee =

American football player (born 1963)

No. 84, 87
- Position: Tight end

Personal information
- Born: March 16, 1963 (age 63); Corsicana, Texas, U.S.
- Listed height: 6 ft 2 in (1.88 m)
- Listed weight: 235 lb (107 kg)

Career information
- High school: Corsicana
- College: Lamar (1981–1984)
- NFL draft: 1985: 6th round, 163rd overall pick

Career history
- Washington Redskins (1985); Pittsburgh Steelers (1987); Atlanta Falcons (1988)

Career NFL statistics
- Receptions: 12
- Receiving yards: 124
- Stats at Pro Football Reference

Danzell Ivan Lee (born March 16, 1963) is an American former professional football player who was a tight end for two seasons in the National Football League (NFL) with the Pittsburgh Steelers and Atlanta Falcons. He was selected by the Washington Redskins in the seventh round of the 1985 NFL draft. He played college football for the Lamar Cardinals.

== Early life and college ==
Danzell Ivan Lee was born on March 16, 1963, in Corsicana, Texas. He attended Corsicana High School in Corsicana.

Lee received a scholarship to play college football at Lamar University. He was a member of the Lamar Cardinals from 1981 to 1984 and a three-year letterman from 1982 to 1984. He graduated from Lamar with a Bachelor of Science.

== Professional career ==
Lee was selected by the Washington Redskins in the sixth round, with the 163rd overall pick, of the 1985 NFL draft. He officially signed with the team on July 18, 1985. He was placed on injured reserve on August 27, 1985, and spent the entire 1985 season there. He was released by the Redskins on August 19, 1986.

Lee signed with the Pittsburgh Steelers on March 29, 1987. He was released on September 7 before being re-signed on September 24, 1987, during the 1987 NFL players strike. He stuck with the team after the three-week strike was over. He played in 13 games, all starts, for the Steelers during the 1987 season, catching 12 passes for 124 yards and recovering one fumble. He was released by the Steelers on September 6, 1988.

Lee was signed by the Atlanta Falcons on September 18, 1988. He was released on October 17, re-signed on November 23, released again on December 12, and re-signed again on December 14, 1988. Overall, he appeared in five games for the Falcons in 1988 but did not record any statistics. He was released for the final time on August 28, 1989.

== Post-playing career ==
In 1996, Lee became the assistant principal of Collins Middle School. He was the assistant principal at his alma mater Corsicana High School from 1997 to 1999 and the principal from 2000 to 2004. Afterwards, he became the executive director of administration for the Corsicana Independent School District. In 1999, Lee graduated from Stephen F. Austin State University with a Masters of Education and mid-management certification.
