= Oak Valley, Texas =

- Town
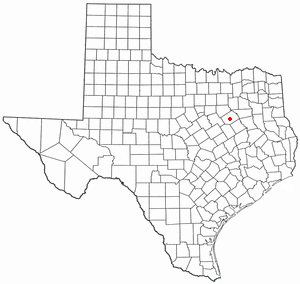
- Location of Oak Valley, Texas

- Coordinates: 32°02′09″N 96°30′17″W
- Country: United States
- State: Texas
- County: Navarro

Area
  - Total: 1.97 sq mi (5.09 km^{2})
  - Land: 1.93 sq mi (5.01 km^{2})
  - Water: 0.031 sq mi (0.08 km^{2})
- Elevation: 420 ft (130 m)

Population (2020)
  - Total: 406
  - Density: 210/sq mi (81.0/km^{2})
- Time zone: UTC-6 (Central (CST))
  - Summer (DST): UTC-5 (CDT)
- FIPS code: 48-53217
- GNIS feature ID: 2413066
- Website: www.oakvalleytx.org

Oak Valley is a town in Navarro County, Texas, United States. The population was 406 at the 2020 census.

== Geography ==
According to the United States Census Bureau, the town has a total area of 2.0 square miles (5.2 km^{2}), all land.

== Demographics ==
Historical population
Census	Pop.	Note	%±
1980	192		—
1990	388		102.1%
2000	401		3.4%
2010	368		−8.2%
2020	406		10.3%
U.S. Decennial Census; 2020 Census

As of the census of 2000, there were 401 people, 143 households, and 112 families residing in the town. The population density was 203.6 inhabitants per square mile (78.6/km^{2}). There were 153 housing units at an average density of 77.7 per square mile (30.0/km^{2}). The racial makeup of the town was 91.77% White, 1.75% African American, 0.25% Native American, 0.25% Asian, 2.49% from other races, and 3.49% from two or more races. Hispanic or Latino of any race were 3.49% of the population.

There were 143 households, out of which 39.9% had children under the age of 18 living with them, 65.0% were married couples living together, 9.1% had a female householder with no husband present, and 21.0% were non-families. 19.6% of all households were made up of individuals, and 8.4% had someone living alone who was 65 years of age or older. The average household size was 2.80 and the average family size was 3.19.

In the town, the population was spread out, with 29.9% under the age of 18, 8.5% from 18 to 24, 26.2% from 25 to 44, 25.4% from 45 to 64, and 10.0% who were 65 years of age or older. The median age was 35 years. For every 100 females, there were 95.6 males. For every 100 females age 18 and over, there were 96.5 males.

The median income for a household in the town was $36,250, and the median income for a family was $46,250. Males had a median income of $30,729 versus $21,625 for females. The per capita income for the town was $16,639. About 3.7% of families and 10.4% of the population were below the poverty line, including 11.3% of those under age 18 and 14.9% of those age 65 or over.

== Education ==
The Town of Oak Valley is served by the Corsicana Independent School District.
