= Retreat, Texas =

- Town
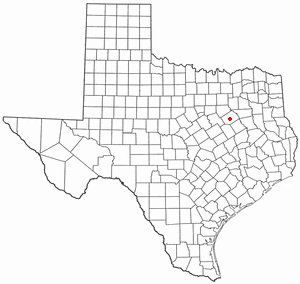
- Location of Retreat, Texas

- Coordinates: 32°03′02″N 96°28′43″W
- Country: United States
- State: Texas
- County: Navarro

Area
  - Total: 5.01 sq mi (12.98 km^{2})
  - Land: 4.98 sq mi (12.91 km^{2})
  - Water: 0.027 sq mi (0.07 km^{2})
- Elevation: 456 ft (139 m)

Population (2020)
  - Total: 410
  - Density: 82/sq mi (32/km^{2})
- Time zone: UTC-6 (Central (CST))
  - Summer (DST): UTC-5 (CDT)
- FIPS code: 48-61616
- GNIS feature ID: 2412544
- Website: www.cityofretreat.com

Historical population
Census	Pop.	Note	%±
1970	263		—
1980	255		−3.0%
1990	334		31.0%
2000	339		1.5%
2010	377		11.2%
2020	410		8.8%
U.S. Decennial Census; 2020 Census

Retreat is a town in Navarro County, Texas, United States. The population was 410 at the 2020 census.

== Geography ==
According to the United States Census Bureau, the town has a total area of 5.0 square miles (13 km^{2}), of which, 5.0 square miles (13 km^{2}) are land and 0.04 sq mi (0.10 km^{2}) (0.40%) is covered by water.

== History ==
Retreat is located on Farm to Market Road 709, just south of Corsicana in south central Navarro County. The site was settled in the 1840s and originally known as Beeman's School House. For many years, the log school building, which was also used as a church, was the only church or school in the area. As a result of shifting population, the building was moved more than once. When someone consequently suggested calling the settlement Retreat, the name stuck. A public school was in operation by 1900, and in 1906, it had an enrollment of 50. In the mid-1930s, Retreat had a store, a gin, a cemetery, and a number of houses. After World War II, the store closed, but the population in recent years has increased because of the community's proximity to Corsicana. In the mid-1960s, the estimated population was 100; by 1990, it had grown to 334. Most of the residents worked in Corsicana.

== Demographics ==
As of the census of 2000, 339 people, 124 households, and 108 families were residing in the town. The population density was 68.3 inhabitants per square mile (26.4/km^{2}). The 127 housing units averaged 25.6 per square mile (9.9/km^{2}). The racial makeup of the town was 91.45% White, 4.72% African American, 2.65% Pacific Islander, 1.18% from other races. Hispanics or Latinos of any race were 3.54% of the population.

Of the 124 households, 33.9% had children under the age of 18 living with them, 75.8% were married couples living together, 5.6% had a female householder with no husband present, and 12.1% were not families. About 9.7% of all households were made up of individuals, and 5.6% had someone living alone who was 65 years of age or older. The average household size was 2.73, and the average family size was 2.90.

In the town, the population was distributed as 23.9% under the age of 18, 6.8% from 18 to 24, 26.8% from 25 to 44, 34.2% from 45 to 64, and 8.3% who were 65 years of age or older. The median age was 40 years. For every 100 females, there were 103.0 males. For every 100 females age 18 and over, there were 106.4 males.

The median income for a household in the town was $49,688, and for a family was $58,125. Males had a median income of $31,250 versus $25,625 for females. The per capita income for the town was $21,308. About 1.9% of families and 6.6% of the population were below the poverty line, including 10.3% of those under age 18 and 7.1% of those age 65 or over.

== Education ==
The Town of Retreat is served by the Corsicana Independent School District.
