= Corsicana Independent School District =

School district in Texas, United States

Coordinates: 32.0841°N 96.4875°W

Corsicana High School

Location
- 3701 West Highway 22; Corsicana, (Navarro County), Texas 75110; United States

Information
- Type: Public high school
- Principal: Aaron Tidwell
- Staff: 113.34 (FTE)
- Enrollment: 1,812 (2023–24)
- Student to teacher ratio: 15.99
- Colors: Blue and gold
- Athletics conference: UIL 5A
- Nickname: Tigers

Corsicana Independent School District is a public school district based in Corsicana, Texas, United States.

In addition to Corsicana, the district serves the central Navarro County towns of Angus, Mustang, Oak Valley, Retreat, and Richland. A very small portion of the district extends into northern Freestone County.

In 2019, the school district received a “B" rating by the Texas Education Agency.

The mascot for Corsicana ISD is a Tiger (called Lady Tigers when referring to the female students). This is a district with around 6,000 students.

== Schools ==
=== High school (Grades 9–12) ===
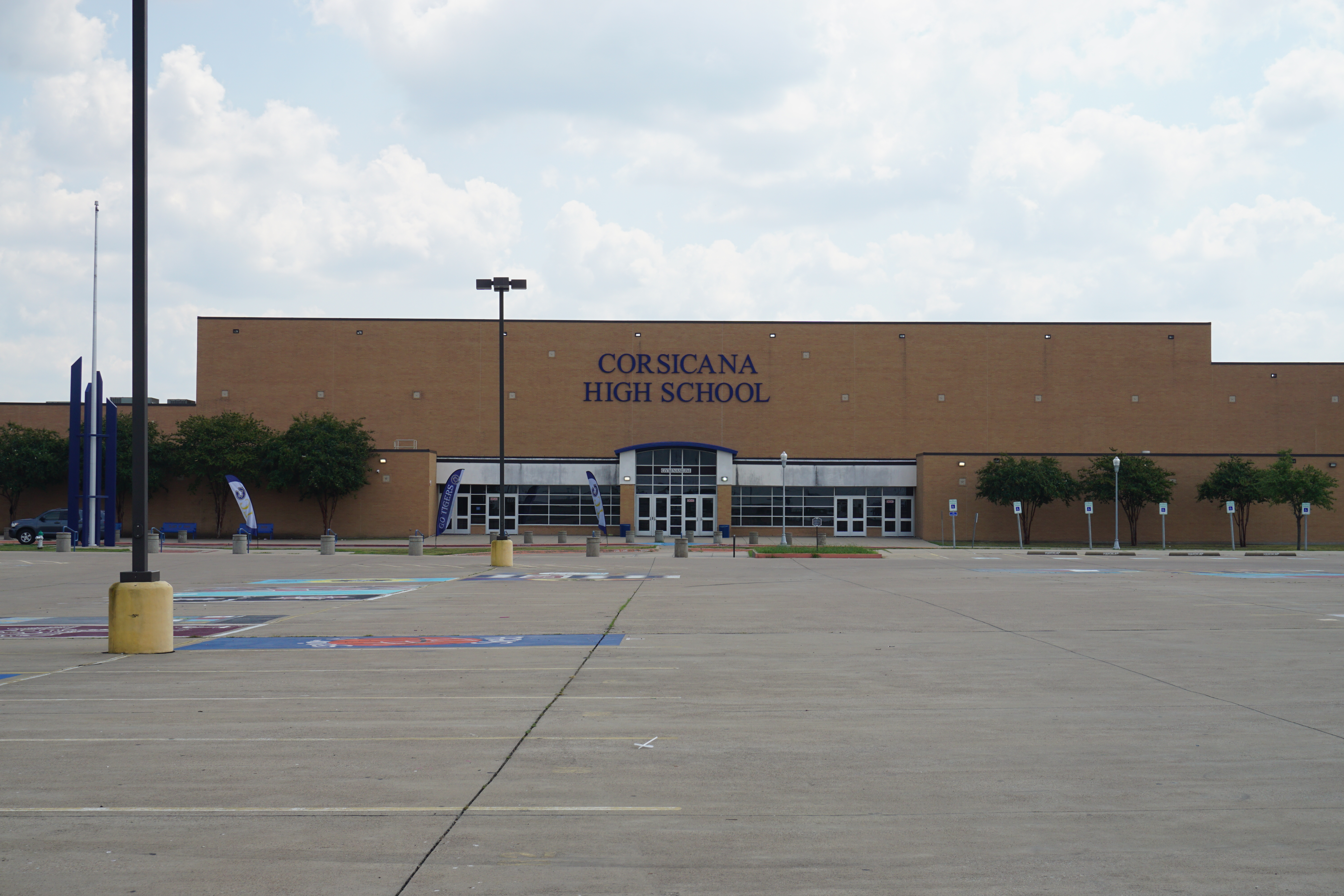
Corsicana High School

- Corsicana High School

==== Notable alumni ====
- Omarius Hines, former NFL wide receiver
- Bill O'Neal, Class of 1960, historian of the American West
- Danieal Manning, Class of 2001, former NFL defensive back
- Monica Aldama, Navarro College Cheerleading Coach
- Wesley Johnson, Class of 2006, Syracuse Orange forward, Los Angeles Lakers forward
- Louis N. Vasquez, former NFL offensive guard
- David Hawthorne, former NFL linebacker
- Danzell Lee, former NFL tight end
- Bethel Johnson, former NFL wide receiver

=== Middle school (Grades 7–8) ===
- Corsicana Middle School

=== Intermediate school (Grades 5–6) ===
- Corsicana Intermediate School

=== Elementary schools ===
- Grades K-5
  - James Bowie Elementary
  - James W. Fannin Elementary
  - Jose Antonio Navarro Elementary School
  - Ezra L. Carroll Elementary
  - Sam Houston Dual Language Magnet Elementary School
- Pre-K and Early Childhood
  - Drane Learning Center

== Former schools ==
William Barrett Travis Elementary School was previously in operation in Corsicana. It first opened in 1923, replacing the Mineral Hill School.
