= Nimrod, Texas =

Unincorporated community in Texas, US

Coordinates: 32°16′20″N 99°03′09″W

Nimrod is an unincorporated community in Eastland County in the U.S. state of Texas. It is located on Farm to Market Road 569 and was originally settled in 1876. The town may have been called Monroe or Curtis, but was later changed to Nimrod for a biblical character of the same name.
