= Burr, Texas =

- Unincorporated community
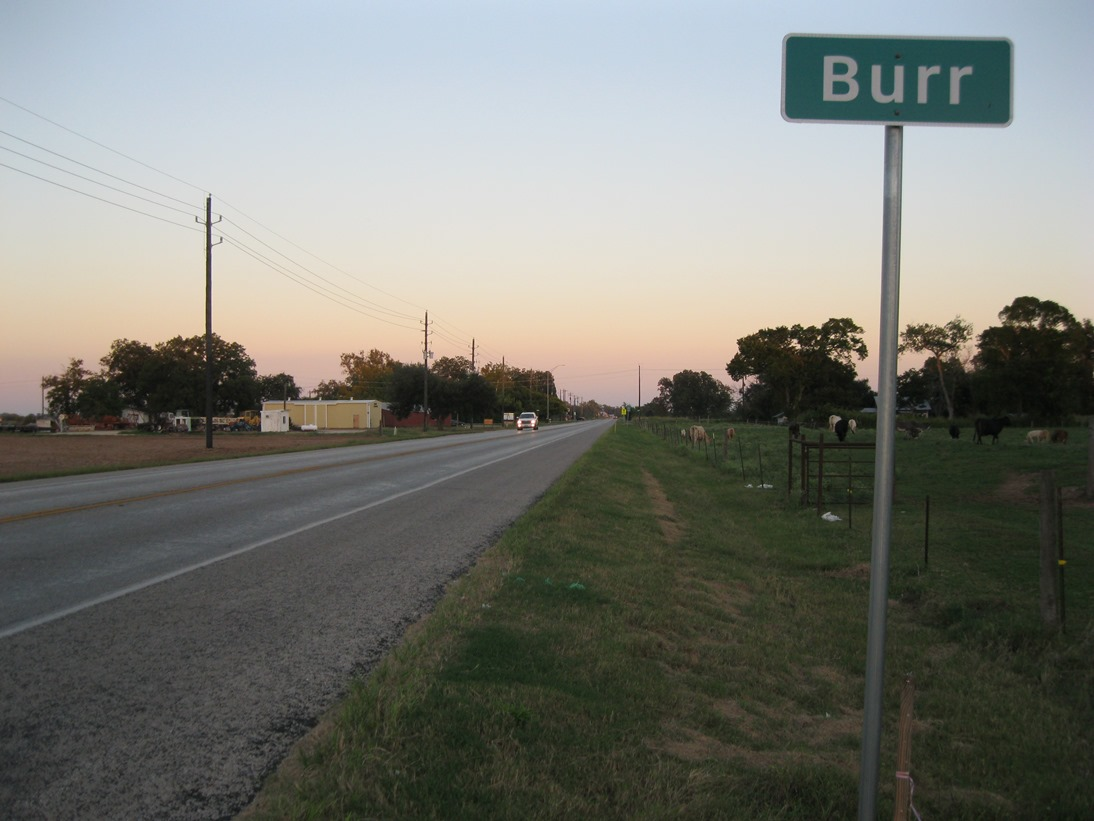
- Burr sign

- Location within the state of Texas Burr, Texas (the United States)
- Coordinates: 29°18′29″N 96°00′27″W
- Country: United States
- State: Texas
- County: Wharton
- Elevation: 95 ft (29 m)
- Time zone: UTC-6 (Central (CST))
  - Summer (DST): UTC-5 (CDT)
- ZIP code: 77488
- Area code: 979
- GNIS feature ID: 1379484

Burr, also known as Lawson's Corner or Kriegel Switch, is an unincorporated community in eastern Wharton County, in the U.S. state of Texas. The small community is situated on Farm to Market Road 1301 (FM 1301) to the east of the county seat at Wharton. The settlement was first established just before the Civil War, when two plantations were set up in the area. In the 1890s, it was a thriving community, but by the 1940s it had begun to dwindle. In 2013, a few businesses and several homes and farms were in the area.

== History ==
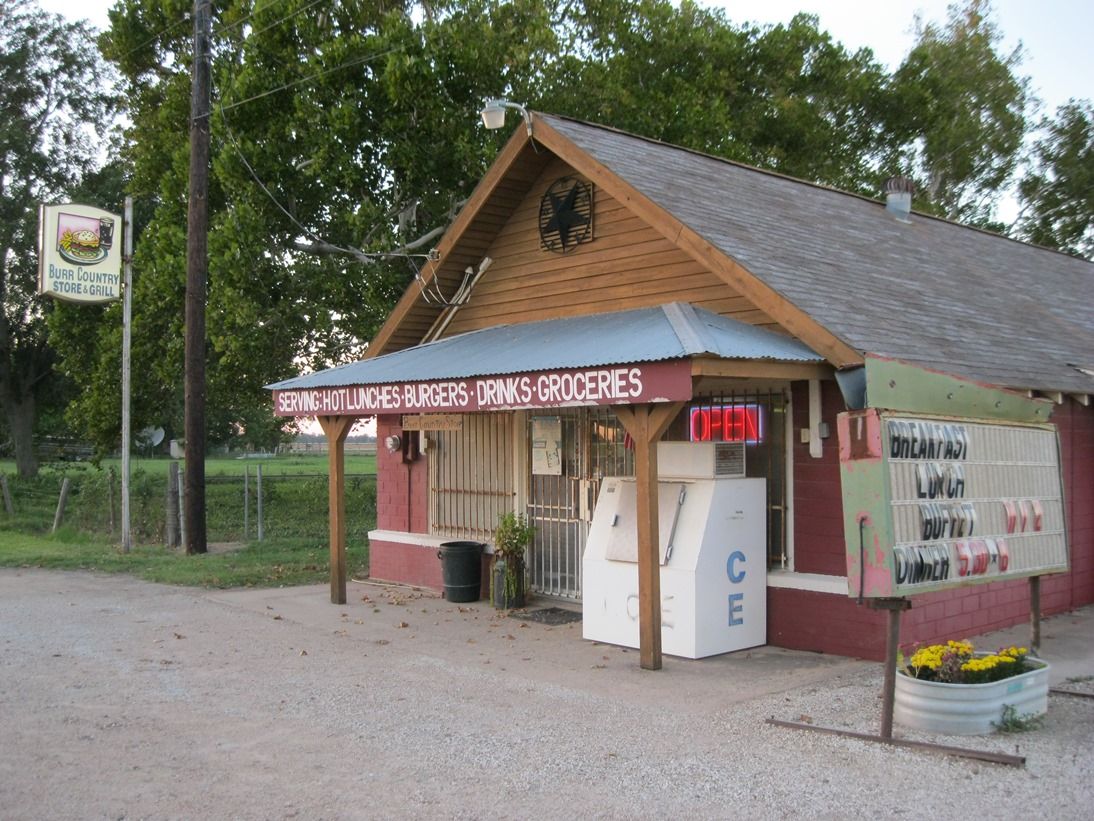
Burr Country Store and Grill

In 1859, Burr Albert Harrison moved his family to the area. He and his slaves built a plantation, grist, sugar, and syrup mills along Caney Creek. Another family named Callaway started a plantation about the same time. The 1860 census noted that the Callaways owned 90 slaves and the Harrisons owned 83. The community was first named Lawson's Corner for Dick Lawson who established a general store between his plantation and Harrison place. The property owners pitched in to build a church but it burned down soon after the Civil War. Burr Harrison died in 1881. His son and successor to the plantation, Gerard Alexander Harrison built a general store that rivaled any in Wharton in 1889. In 1991 the brick structure still existed. During the Reconstruction Era, Isam Davenport, an African-American, served as Justice of the Peace and County Commissioner. He allegedly made a habit of sentencing blacks convicted of petty crimes to work in his cotton field.

A Baptist church was constructed in 1892, followed a few years later by another one. A German immigrant, Charles Kriegel moved to the area in 1896 and bought the Lawson store the following year. A post office was established in 1899 and named after Kriegel. In 1900, the New York, Texas and Mexican Railway was built from Wharton to Van Vleck and Sargent. The Kriegel Switch station was set up in the Kriegel community across from its school. At the time Kriegel was roughly midway between Dinsmore to the west and Burr to the east. In 1910 the Kriegel post office was closed when Kriegel sold his store. Gerard Harrison moved the post office to his store and named it Burr after his father. In 1915 the Burr community had a church and two stores. In 1918 the Burr post office closed, and mail began to be delivered from Wharton. Burr had one commercial establishment and 83 residents in 1939, but within two years many people moved away. In 1989 there were two businesses.

== Geography ==
Burr is located 6.6 miles (10.6 km) east of Wharton and 4.9 miles (7.9 km) northwest of Boling. Caney Creek flows in a highly meandering southeasterly course to the south of FM 1301.

== Education ==
A school at Lawson opened sometime after 1889. It was replaced in 1893 by a second school in a more suitable location. Since most local residents were African-American and white enrollment was so small, the Lawson school for whites first had a school year lasting only four months. The Lawson school for whites had one teacher and 21 students in 1905; there were 31 pupils two years later. In 1907 the Kriegel school had nine teachers and 358 black students. The Lawson school continued to operate in 1915 and was rebuilt in 1919. The Lawson school had 100 students in 1942; in 1947, it became part of the Boling Independent School District.
