= Magnet, Texas =

- Unincorporated community
- Location within the state of Texas Magnet, Texas (the United States)
- Coordinates: 29°09′03″N 95°59′13″W
- Country: United States
- State: Texas
- County: Wharton
- Elevation: 72 ft (22 m)
- Time zone: UTC-6 (Central (CST))
  - Summer (DST): UTC-5 (CDT)
- ZIP code: 77488
- Area code: 979

Magnet is an unincorporated community in southeastern Wharton County, Texas, United States. The rural community is situated at the intersection of State Highway 60 (SH 60) and County Road 102, a short distance north of the Matagorda County line. Magnet is identified by road signs on SH 60 and by a tall broadcasting tower. According to the Handbook of Texas, the community had a population of 42 in 2000. it is located within the Greater Houston metropolitan area.

== History ==
Circa 1907, the Taylor-Fowler Land Company of Oklahoma laid out a town on the Gulf, Colorado and Santa Fe Railway. In 1911, Frank D. and Fred Fowler began selling 12,000 acres, promoting the area's rich soil. The same year, a post office was opened. According to one story, the town was named Magnet because the good soil would draw potential farmers. Another account claimed it was because saloons there would attract drinkers from Bay City, which was dry. In 1912, the new town boasted a few grocery stores plus a drugstore, gristmill, hotel, and lumberyard. Within two years, there were forty persons living in Magnet alongside a blacksmith shop, canning factory, cotton gin, garage, two general stores, rice grower, and the Truck Growers Association. In 1925, the first producing oil well in Wharton County was drilled in the Boling Field near Iago. This started a 1920s oil drilling boom during which the Magnet Withers Field was first exploited.

By the 1930s, there were 50 residents of Magnet. The discovery of additional nearby oil in 1937 did not increase the population. By 1943, the post office operated out of the sole remaining commercial establishment in the community. By 1949, there were only 20 persons in Magnet and the post office closed in 1954. Between 1968 and 2000, the population was 42. In the latter year, no businesses were reported in Magnet. In 2004, the BNSF Railway applied to discontinue 20.89 miles (33.62 km) of the line from Bay City north to Cane Junction and then northeast to Newgulf, because there had been no rail traffic for two years. This stretch of track included Magnet. In 2012, Milagro Oil and Gas, Inc. drilled three successful wells in the Magnet Withers field.

== Geography ==
Magnet is on the east side of SH 60 a distance of 11.8 miles (19.0 km) north of Bay City and 13.4 miles (21.6 km) southeast of Wharton. The Old Lane City Magnet Road runs parallel and east of SH 60; it goes 5.0 miles (8.0 km) northwest to Lane City. There are about two dozen homes clustered at Magnet and along Mauldin Road, which goes to the northeast. The Magnet Baptist Church is located on County Road 102 in the community. The community gives its name to the Magnet Withers oil field.

== Education ==
By 1912 there was a school in Magnet. In 1926, the Magnet school employed three teachers to instruct 130 white and five black students. A 1936 map depicted two schools. The schools became part of the Wharton Independent School District in 1947.

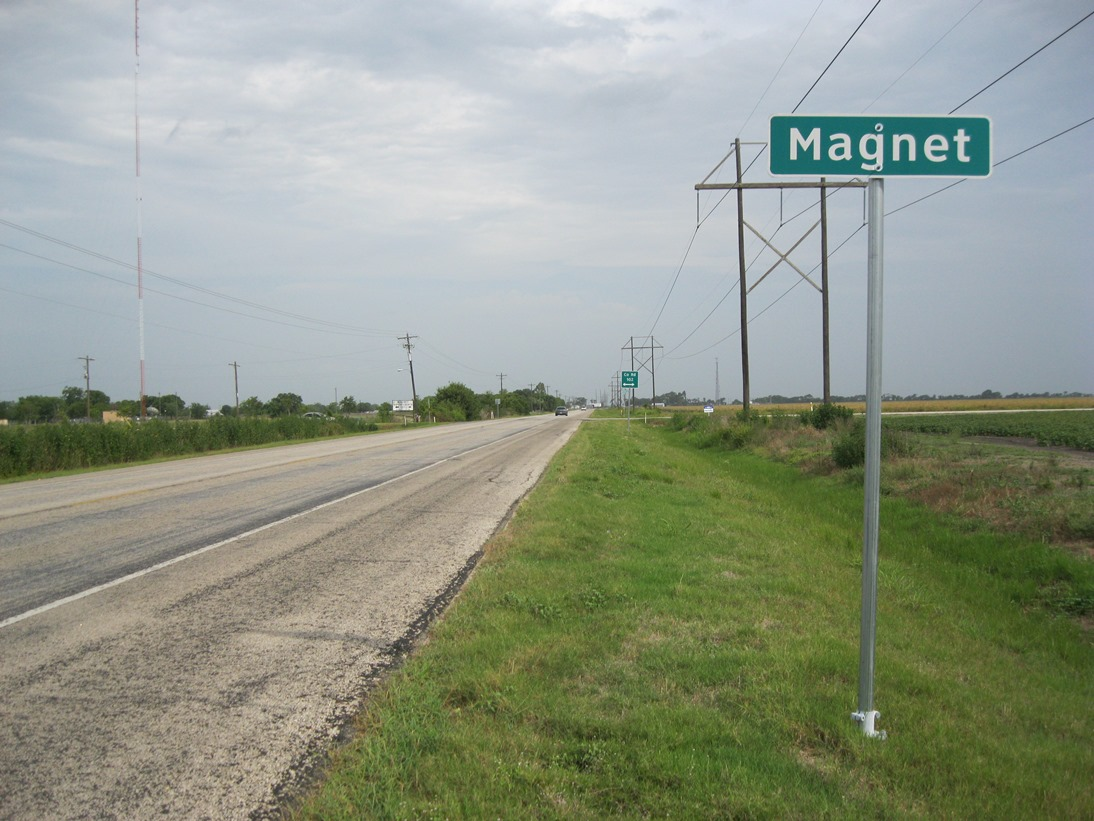
Magnet sign and broadcasting tower are on Highway 60.

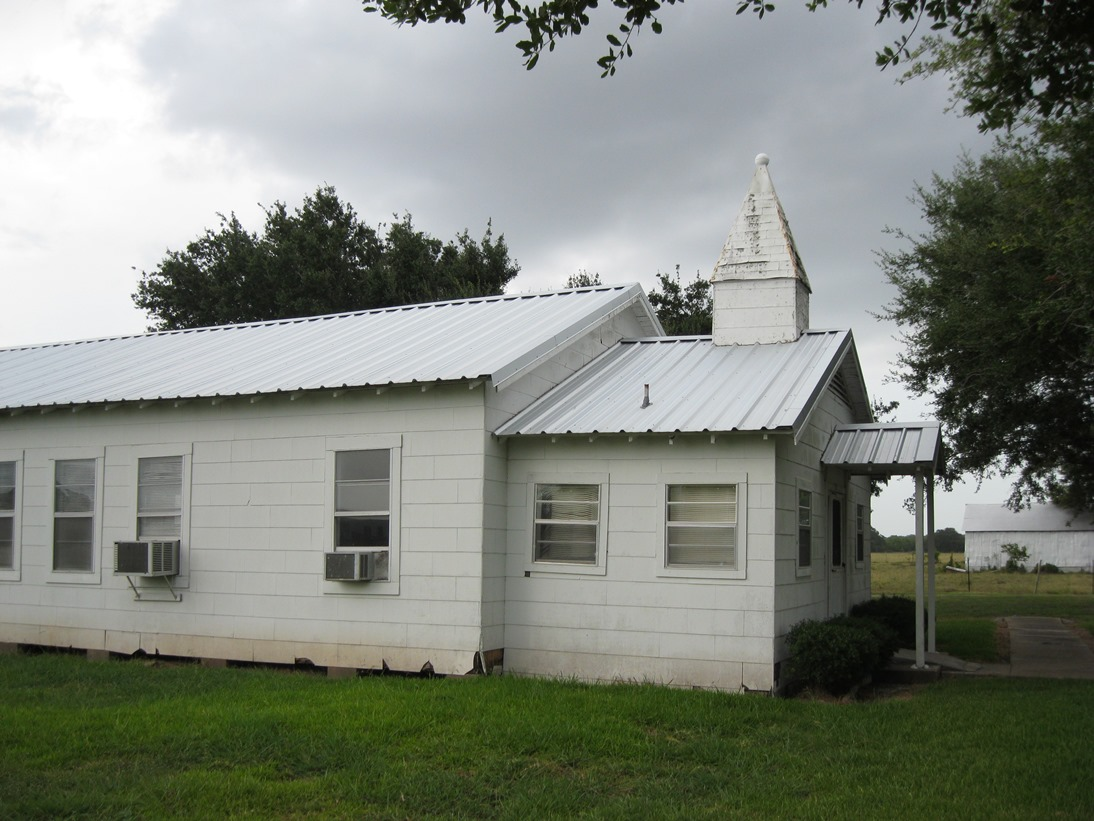
Magnet Baptist Church is on County Road 102.

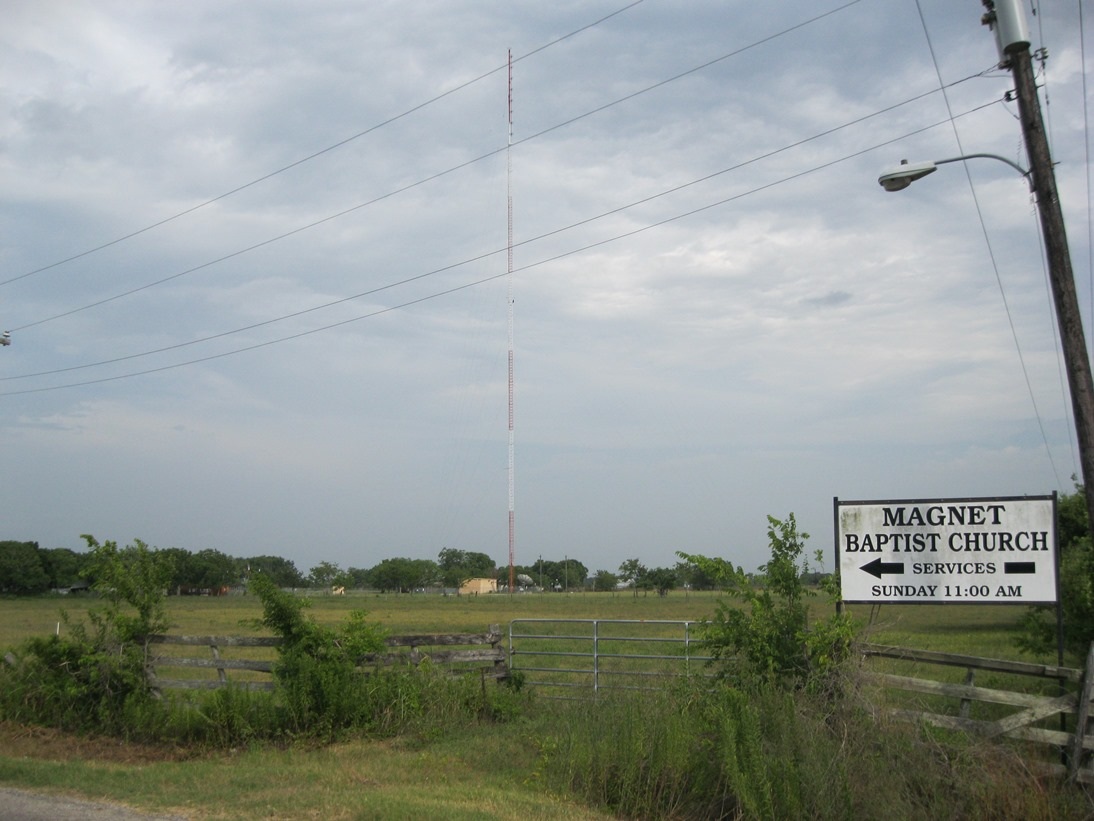
The broadcasting tower is a prominent landmark.
