= Mackay, Texas =

- Unincorporated community
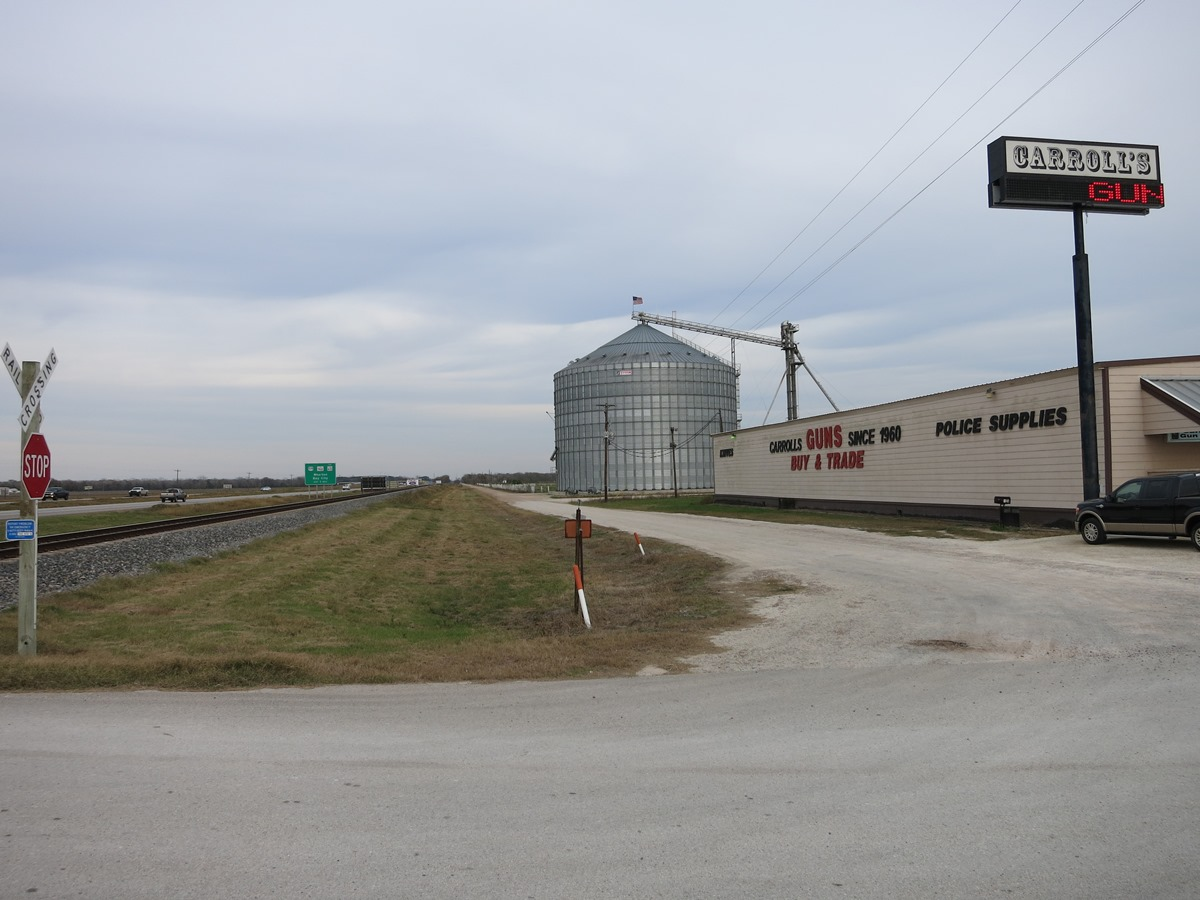
- Silo and gun store on the east side of US 59

- Location within the state of Texas Mackay, Texas (the United States)
- Coordinates: 29°16′12″N 96°08′59″W
- Country: United States
- State: Texas
- County: Wharton
- Elevation: 98 ft (30 m)
- Time zone: UTC-6 (Central (CST))
  - Summer (DST): UTC-5 (CDT)
- ZIP code: 77488
- Area code: 979
- GNIS feature ID: 1380124

Mackay is an unincorporated community in central Wharton County, in the U.S. state of Texas. The once thriving community is located on U.S. Route 59, (US 59) southwest of Wharton near Wharton Regional Airport. Mackay began as a railroad stop near a large ranch in 1881 and saw an influx of immigrants beginning in 1907. The community had its own post office from 1921 to 1937, but most of the buildings were gone by 1990. There were two businesses and a grain silo at the site in 2014.

== History ==
Mackay began as a station on the New York, Texas and Mexican Railway in 1881. It was named after Nevada silver magnate John William Mackay, one of the railroad's investors. The station was located on property owned by Abel Head "Shanghai" Pierce, whose nearby ranch was managed by his nephew A. P. Borden. A post office operated for several months in 1885 before being closed. The USDA set up an experimental tea and camphor farm in 1907. Russian and Chinese workers were imported to work on the farm and Borden built homes for them near his company store. In 1912, he erected a school for the immigrant children, which was later donated to the county as a common-school district. At the insistence of his wife, Borden built a church in nearby Pierce where she taught Sunday School. Postal service was restored to the community in 1921, with Borden as the postmaster. In 1922, Borden retired from managing the Pierce Ranch to run his own 5,000 acres (2,023 ha) farm from a large house in Mackay.

Borden died in 1934 and the property was sold to Johnny B. Ferguson, an oil wildcatter. Mail service stopped in 1937 and the 1940 census recorded 20 residents in Mackay. Ferguson found oil on the ranch in 1949 and operated his company out of Borden's old store. In 1953, Mackay's school became part of the Wharton Independent School District. Ferguson became famous for owning thoroughbreds Top Deck and Go Man Go. In 1967, Wharton bought 89 acres (36 ha) from Ferguson for an airport. Ferguson died in 1978. Two years later, the airport expanded to 120 acres (49 ha). By 1990, most of the buildings had disappeared.

== Geography ==
Mackay is on US 59, a distance of 4.4 miles (7.1 km) to the southwest of Wharton at the intersection of County Road 467. The entrance to Wharton Regional Airport is on US 59, 0.7 miles (1.1 km) farther to the southwest. In 2014, there were four structures in the area, a gun store, a small house, a grain silo and a combination filling station and restaurant. Bosque Creek flows southeast through the area before emptying into the Colorado River, south of Wharton.
