= Waterville, Texas =

- Ghost town
- Location within the state of Texas
- Coordinates: 29°14′18″N 95°59′48″W
- Country: United States
- State: Texas
- County: Wharton
- Elevation: 80 ft (24 m)
- Time zone: UTC-6 (Central (CST))
  - Summer (DST): UTC-5 (CDT)
- ZIP code: 77488
- Area code: 979

Waterville was a ghost town in Wharton County in the U.S. state of Texas. The former settlement was located along Water Hole Creek, near the site of Preston, another ghost town. During the Civil War, the town provided soldiers to the Confederate States Army as well as a Home Guard unit. Waterville had a post office intermittently between 1859 and 1880. Local residents attempted to restart postal service in 1883, but it was permanently stopped the following year.

== History ==
The settlement of Waterville sprang up along Water Hole Creek near a place called Will's Water Hole. In January 1859, a post office was set up in the community. Waterville was near Preston in southeastern Wharton County. The town was situated along a major trail from Matagorda on the Gulf of Mexico and San Felipe on the Brazos River.

During the Civil War, Waterville raised a company of soldiers for the Confederate Army called the "Rough and Ready Mounted Rifles" under Captain C. F. Whittington. In 1861, there were 27 men enrolled, but the number expanded to 39 the following year. In 1862, the town was the headquarters for Colonel Reuben R. Brown's 33rd Texas Cavalry Regiment. Waterville's Home Guard unit numbered 49 men in 1862, but 18 of the men had no firearms. The available weapons were a motley collection of nine rifles, 12 shotguns and five pistols. Postal service was discontinued in 1867, resumed in 1872 and stopped again in 1880. In 1883, a new application was submitted for postal service. Evidently there were too few residents, because in August 1884 postal service was stopped and never revived.

== Geography ==
The 1883 postal application located Waterville on a direct line between Wharton and Pledger. The site was 10 miles (16 km) from Wharton and 8 miles (13 km) from Pledger. Five-ninths of the distance along a straight line drawn on a map between Wharton and Pledger places Waterville very close to Farm to Market Road 1096 and Water Hole Creek. There are turf farms nearby.
