= Don-Tol, Texas =

- Unincorporated community
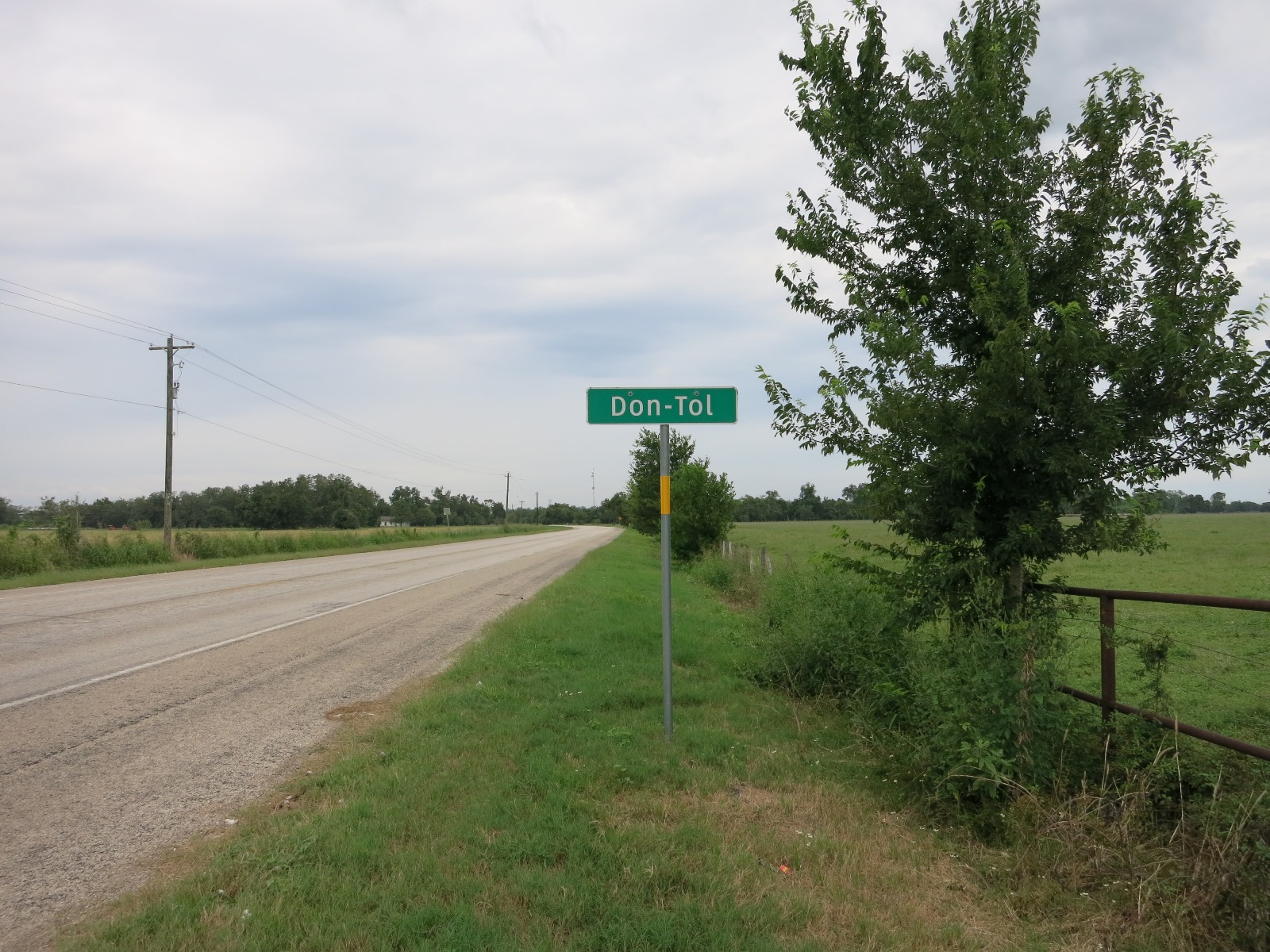
- Don-Tol sign along FM 1301 looking north

- Location within the state of Texas Don-Tol, Texas (the United States)
- Coordinates: 29°13′23″N 95°55′00″W
- Country: United States
- State: Texas
- County: Wharton
- Elevation: 72 ft (22 m)
- Time zone: UTC-6 (Central (CST))
  - Summer (DST): UTC-5 (CDT)
- ZIP code: 77420
- Area code: 979
- GNIS feature ID: 1379672

Don-Tol is a small unincorporated community in southeastern Wharton County, in the U.S. state of Texas. The community is located along FM 1301 southeast of Boling. There is a Don-Tol sign on FM 1301 at County Road 100. The name was used by Mexican workers to address William Toliver Taylor, the owner of a post-Civil War sugar cane plantation.

== History ==
The Taylor family moved to Texas in 1846. After the Civil War, brothers William Toliver Taylor and Solomon Tyre Taylor became partners with G. C. Duncan, who owned 583 acres (236 ha) of land in eastern Wharton County. The venture was a success and the two men bought Duncan's acreage. The Taylors expanded their property to 12,000 acres (4,856 ha), growing corn, cotton, sugar cane, and other crops. The brothers hired Mexican workers to farm their land and the laborers began calling Toliver "Don Tol" in the Spanish style. When the Taylors split the plantation, Tyre named his western half Parkdale, while Toliver named his eastern portion Don Tol. The brothers' hog pasture was sold to the Texas Gulf Sulphur Company and became the town of Newgulf.

In 1936, there was a factory in Don-Tol. Five years later, its school was absorbed by the Boling Independent School District. A descendant of Toliver, Glenn B. Taylor was killed during World War II when his plane went down in French Indochina. As recently as 1989, the Southern Pacific Railroad ran north and south along FM 1301, while the Atchison, Topeka and Santa Fe Railway ran east and west along the path of the present-day electric transmission lines. Both sets of railroad tracks were gone in 2014.

== Geography ==
Don-Tol is on FM 1301 at the intersection of County Road 101, also known as Dontol Road, a distance of 3.6 miles (5.8 km) southeast of Boling, 15.0 miles (24.1 km) southeast of Wharton and 2.8 miles (4.5 km) north of Pledger, a community in Matagorda County. Caney Creek meanders through the area toward the south. There is a business located at County Road 101 and FM 1301. The Don-Tol sign is located to the south at the County Road 100 junction. To the north, there is an electric power sub-station where an overhead transmission line runs east and west.
