= Peach Creek, Wharton County, Texas =

Peach Creek, Texas
- Ghost town
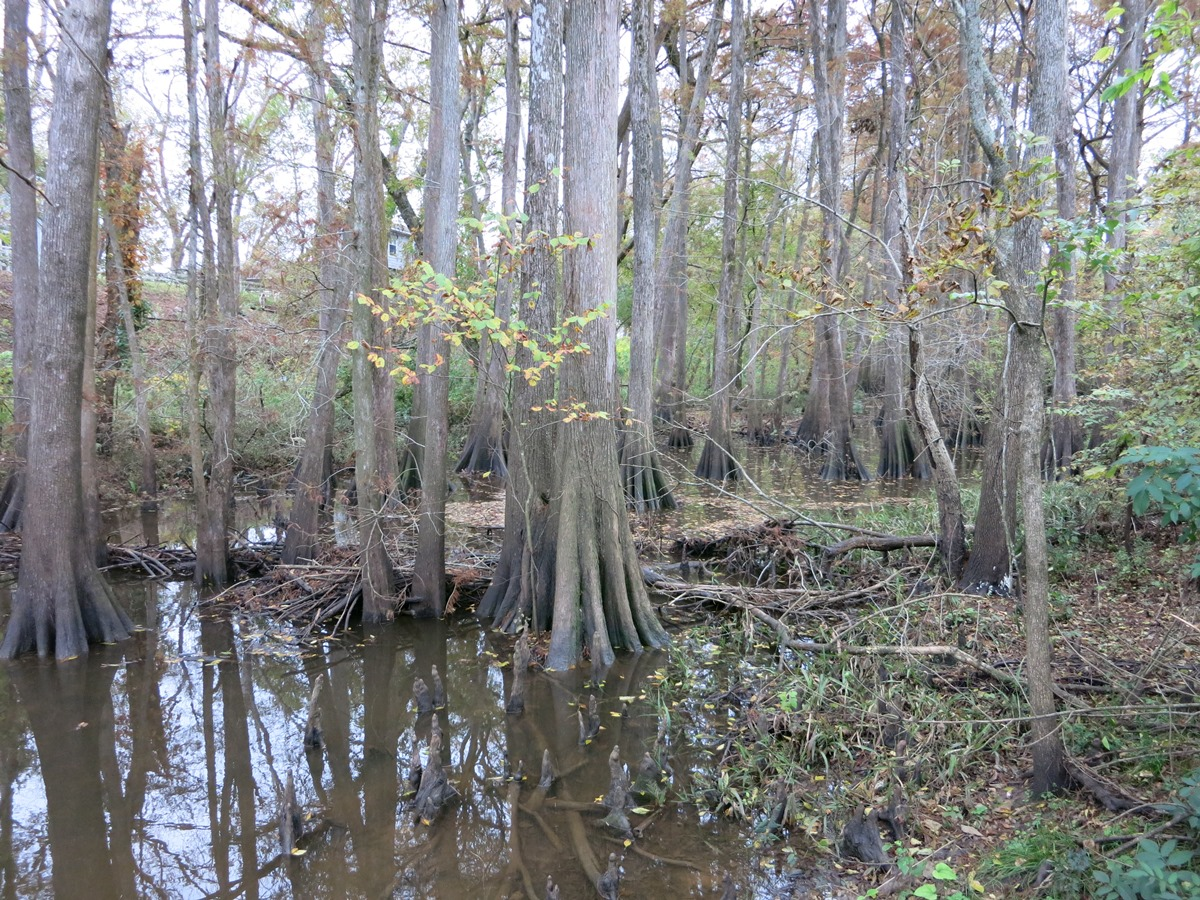
- Peach Creek bottom at the CR 135 bridge looking west

- Location within the state of Texas
- Coordinates: 29°20′8″N 95°56′58″W
- Country: United States
- State: Texas
- County: Wharton
- Elevation: 49 ft (15 m)
- Time zone: UTC-6 (Central (CST))
  - Summer (DST): UTC-5 (CDT)
- ZIP code: 77488
- Area code: 979
- GNIS feature ID: 1375383

Peach Creek is a ghost town in Wharton County in the U.S. state of Texas. The former settlement was located along Peach Creek in the land grants belonging to Old Three Hundred settlers William Kincheloe and Alexander Jackson, Sr. During the Republic of Texas a post office was located at Peach Creek. Though it was hoped the community might become the county seat, that never happened and postal service stopped in 1847.

== Geography ==
Peach Creek rises west of Farm to Market Road 102 near Egypt. The stream flows generally southeast for a distance of 27 miles (43 km) until it empties into the San Bernard River 8 miles (13 km) southeast of Wharton. A published sketch map from Wharton County deed records placed the settlement along Peach Creek mostly within Kincheloe's land grant and also a short distance into Jackson's land grant to the north. This location is approximately between U.S. Route 59 on the west and County Road 135 (Junior College Blvd.) on the east.

== History ==
William and Mary Betts Kincheloe moved to Texas in 1821. Two years later, the Mexican census recorded William as being 44 years old and living with his wife and eight children. A blacksmith by trade, Kincheloe received a land grant of a league of land on July 8, 1824. He later donated the land on which the Wharton County courthouse stands, and died in 1835. The east-west trail between Harrisburg and Texana and the north-south trail between Matagorda and San Felipe passed through the area. There were two crossings of Peach Creek; the upper crossing was located in Alexander Jackson's league, while the lower crossing was situated in Kincheloe's league. Later, the upper crossing became known as Kincheloe's Crossing. The owner of the adjacent league to the south, Isham B. Phillips bought 177 acres for a house in Kincheloe's league next to the lower crossing.

When Republic of Texas was founded, a postal station was set up with Phillips as postmaster. In 1839, a second postal station was added at Kincheloe's crossing with Alexander Jackson, Jr. as postmaster. The upper crossing was then in Colorado County and the lower crossing in Matagorda County. When Wharton County was established in 1846, Kincheloe's family offered a location on Peach Creek as the county seat, but this was declined. On July 1, 1847, Peach Creek lost its post office and thereafter received its mail from the new county seat at Wharton.
