= Sand Ridge =

Sand Ridge or Sandridge may refer to:

== Places ==
In Australia

- Electoral district of Sandridge, Victoria
- Port Melbourne, Victoria, historically known as Sandridge

In the United Kingdom

- Sandridge, Hertfordshire, a village and civil parish
- Sandridge, Stoke Gabriel, Devon
- Sandridge, Wiltshire

In the United States

- Sand Ridge neighborhood, Southwest community, Birmingham, Alabama
- Sand Ridge Township, Jackson County, Illinois
- Sand Ridge State Forest, Mason County, Illinois
- Sand Ridge, Indiana, an unincorporated community
- Sand Ridge, New York, a hamlet and census-designated place
- Sand Ridge, Houston County, Texas, an unincorporated community
- Sand Ridge, Wharton County, Texas, an unincorporated community
- Sand Ridge, West Virginia, an unincorporated community
- Sand Ridge, a Tulare Lake sandspit that once formed a chain of islands in California.

== Other uses ==
- Sand Ridge Golf Club, Geauga County, Ohio, United States
- SandRidge Energy, an oil and natural gas exploration company headquartered in Oklahoma City, Oklahoma, United States
- Sandridge Bridge, Melbourne, Victoria, Australia
- Sandridge Trail, a bicycle and pedestrian path in Port Melbourne, Victoria, Australia
- Shane Sandridge, a politician in Colorado

== See also ==
- Sandridge No. 8 Precinct, Menard County, Illinois, United States
- Clough Creek and Sand Ridge Archeological District, near Cincinnati, Ohio, United States
- Sand Hill (disambiguation)
