= Wharton Regional Airport =

- IATA: WHT; ICAO: KARM; FAA LID: ARM

Summary
- Airport type: Public
- Owner: City of Wharton
- Serves: Wharton, Texas, United States
- Elevation AMSL: 100 ft (30 m)
- Coordinates: 29°15′15″N 096°09′15″W

Map
- Location of the airport in Texas

Runways
Direction	Length		Surface
Direction	ft	m	Surface
14/32	5,000	1,524	Asphalt

Statistics (2023)
- Aircraft operations (year ending 4/14/2023): 4,480
- Source: Federal Aviation Administration

Wharton Regional Airport (IATA: WHT, ICAO: KARM, FAA LID: ARM) is a public airport located five miles (8 km) southwest of the central business district of Wharton, a city in Wharton County, Texas, United States. It is owned by the City of Wharton.

Many U.S. airports use the same three-letter location identifier for the FAA and IATA. However, this airport is assigned ARM by the FAA but has been assigned WHT from the IATA. Note that ARM was assigned to Armidale Airport in Armidale, New South Wales, Australia. The airport's former FAA identifier was 5R5.

== Facilities and aircraft ==
Wharton Regional Airport covers an area of 124 acres (50 ha) which contains one asphalt paved runway (14/32) measuring 5,004 x 75 ft (1,525 x 23 m).

For the 12-month period ending April 14, 2023, the airport had 4,480 aircraft operations, an average of 86 per week: 98% general aviation and 2% military.

The airport is used by the South Texas Balloon Launch Team, an amateur radio balloon group based out of Houston, for free float balloon launches. The team launch BLT-27 on Saturday, August 20, 2019 at 10am.

== See also ==
- List of airports in Texas
