= Round Mott, Texas =

- Ghost town
- Location within the state of Texas Round Mott, Texas (the United States)
- Coordinates: 29°13′45″N 96°27′34″W
- Country: United States
- State: Texas
- County: Wharton
- Elevation: 112 ft (34 m)
- Time zone: UTC-6 (Central (CST))
  - Summer (DST): UTC-5 (CDT)
- ZIP code: 77455
- Area code: 979
- GNIS feature ID: 1380462

Round Mott or Round Mott Community is a ghost town in western Wharton County, in the U.S. state of Texas. The community was located northwest of El Campo on FM 1300. The settlement briefly had a post office in the 1880s. A school was in existence by 1905 and served the community until 1951. Only a private home, a cell phone tower and a disused church building remained at the site in 2015.

== Geography ==
Round Mott is situated at the intersection of FM 1300 and County Road 393. This location is a distance of 13.1 miles (21.1 km) northwest of El Campo via FM 1300 and State Highway 71. At the Round Mott crossroads, there is a church with an adjacent home and barn. A cell phone tower is located a short way to the east. Within a 1 mile (1.6 km) radius from Round Mott there are only four additional homes. However, there are more homes along FM 1300 to the east between Round Mott and FM 1160. Lookout Creek passes 1.3 miles (2.1 km) to the east of Round Mott.

== History ==
The Round Mott community was significant enough for a post office to be opened there in 1888, but it closed two years later. By 1905, the settlement had its own school with one teacher and 13 students. Enrollment rose to 50 white and seven black pupils with two instructors in 1926. A map from 1936 showed a school, a church, several homes and two other structures in Round Mott. The school remained open until 1951 when it was absorbed by the El Campo Independent School District. A 1965 map showed only the church and a few structures. Round Mott was still marked on 1989 state highway maps, but the church and a few homes were all that were left. By 2015, the only structures remaining on the site were a residence, an abandoned brick church and a cell phone tower.

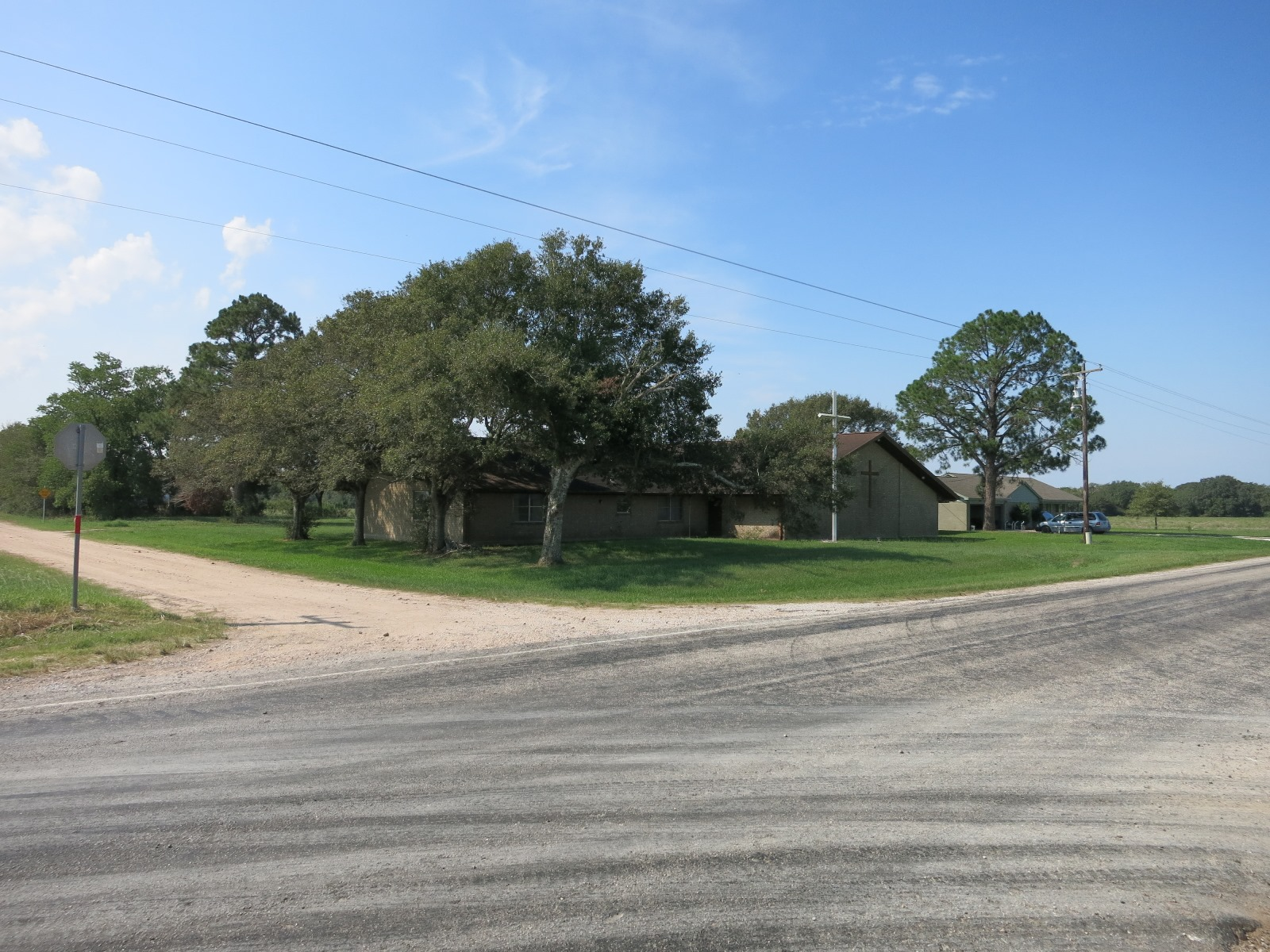
Residence and unused church on FM 1300 at CR 393

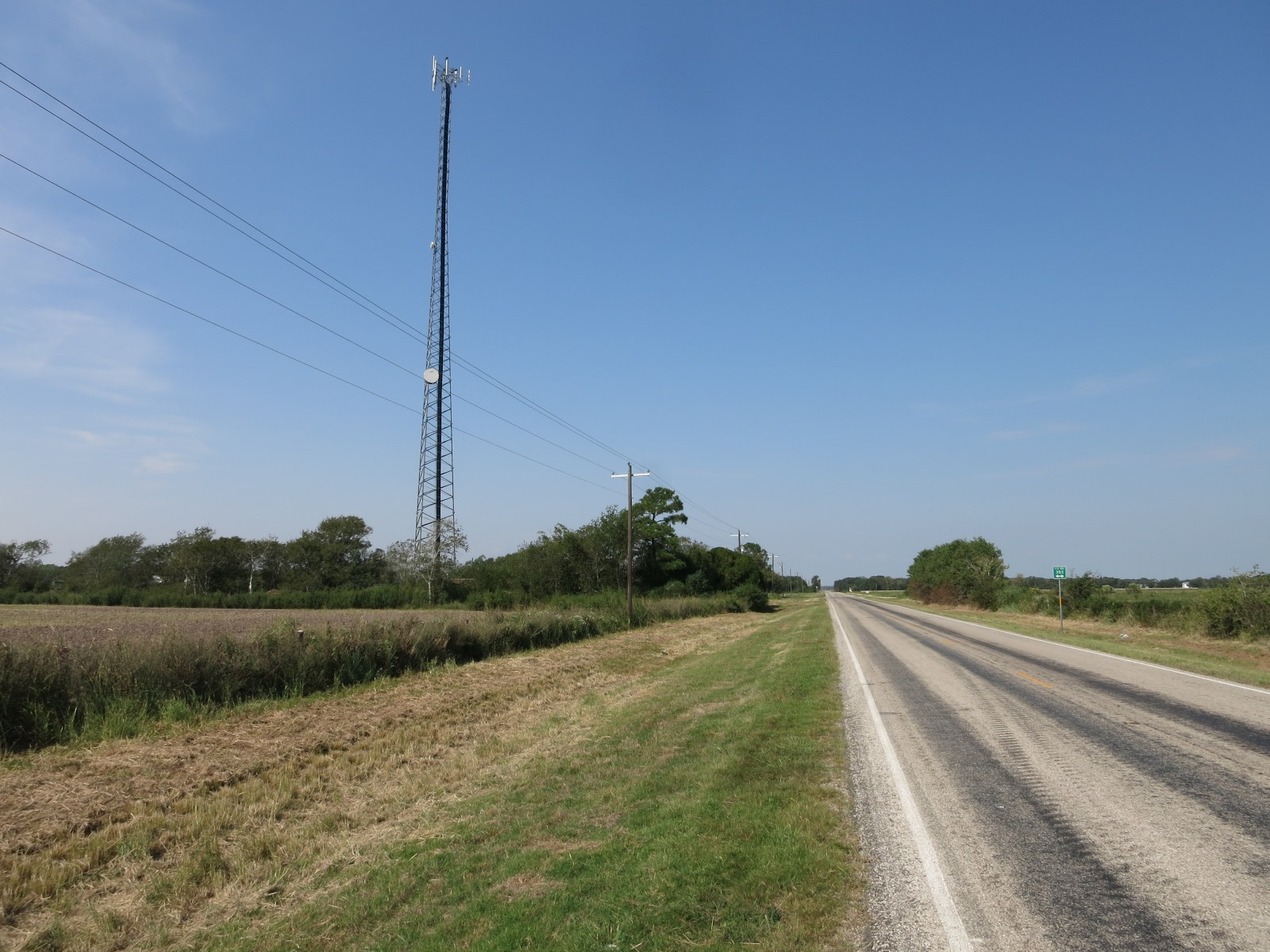
Cell phone tower on FM 1300 near CR 393
