= Preston, Wharton County, Texas =

Preston, Texas
- Ghost town
- Location within the state of Texas
- Coordinates: 29°16′41″N 95°57′50″W
- Country: United States
- State: Texas
- County: Wharton
- Elevation: 85 ft (26 m)
- Time zone: UTC-6 (Central (CST))
  - Summer (DST): UTC-5 (CDT)
- ZIP code: 77488
- Area code: 979
- GNIS feature ID: 1359877

Preston is a ghost town in Wharton County in the U.S. state of Texas. The one-time settlement was located in the land grant belonging to Old Three Hundred settler John Huff near an important north–south trail. During the early years of the Republic of Texas, lots were sold and a town took shape. Postal service began in 1839 and ceased in 1857. The only evidence that a town existed is an old cemetery near Farm to Market Road 1096, (FM 1096) south of Iago.

== History ==
On February 5, 1838, less than two years after the founding of the Republic of Texas, an advertisement appeared in the Matagorda Bulletin newspaper. The notice declared that lots were for sale in the town of Preston by D. D. D. Baker, John Huff and Charles DeMorse. Baker was a veteran of the Battle of San Jacinto, Huff owned the original land grant as one of the Old Three Hundred and DeMorse was a Matagorda attorney. Preston was located 4.5 miles (7.2 km) from the Colorado River on the west and 2.5 miles (4.0 km) from Caney Creek on the east. The town site was situated on the north–south trail from Matagorda to Bastrop and near the road east to Houston via Little's Ferry. The promoters noted that a new county was to be formed and that their new town was an ideal candidate for the county seat. They promised to set up a brick kiln to provide building materials.

A post office was set up in Preston in 1839 with Huff as the first postmaster. However, the post office was discontinued in 1857. The cemetery contains nine graves, Eliza Merrit (d. 1851), Tilson C. Barden (d. 1877), three members of the Bradshaw family (d. 1848, 1854 and 1854) and four members of the Thompson family (d. 1845 1852, 1856 and 1860).

== Geography ==
The town site was located in the John Huff league about 8 miles (13 km) south of Wharton near present-day FM 1096. The cemetery was in poor condition in 1990. South of Iago, FM 1096 heads straight southwest, curving northwest before intersecting with Farm to Market Road 3012.
