= Sand Ridge, Wharton County, Texas =

Sand Ridge, Texas
- Unincorporated community
- Location within the state of Texas Sand Ridge, Texas (the United States)
- Coordinates: 29°25′06″N 96°15′08″W
- Country: United States
- State: Texas
- County: Wharton
- Elevation: 138 ft (42 m)
- Time zone: UTC-6 (Central (CST))
  - Summer (DST): UTC-5 (CDT)
- ZIP code: 77488
- Area code: 979
- GNIS: 1379021

Sand Ridge is an unincorporated community in Wharton County, Texas, United States. It is located within the Greater Houston metropolitan area.

== History ==
The first producing oil well in Wharton County was drilled in 1925, in the Boling Field near Iago. This started an oil-drilling boom, during which numerous fields were exploited. Maps of 1936 displayed two churches, a cemetery, and several homes in Sand Ridge. In the 1980s, the New Colorado Tabernacle Church and another church and several homes were in the vicinity. The railroad was discontinued in 1992 and the rails were removed. In 2013, the Sandridge Baptist Church and the adjacent San Ridge and Mt. Gilead Cemetery was located at the site.

== Geography ==
Sand Ridge is located on Peach Creek, Farm to Market Road 102, and the Atchison, Topeka and Santa Fe Railway, 10 mi (16 km) north of Wharton in north-central Wharton County.

== Education ==
In 1905, 50 black students were enrolled in the Sand Ridge school, which also had one teacher. Today, the community is served by the El Campo Independent School District.

== Gallery ==
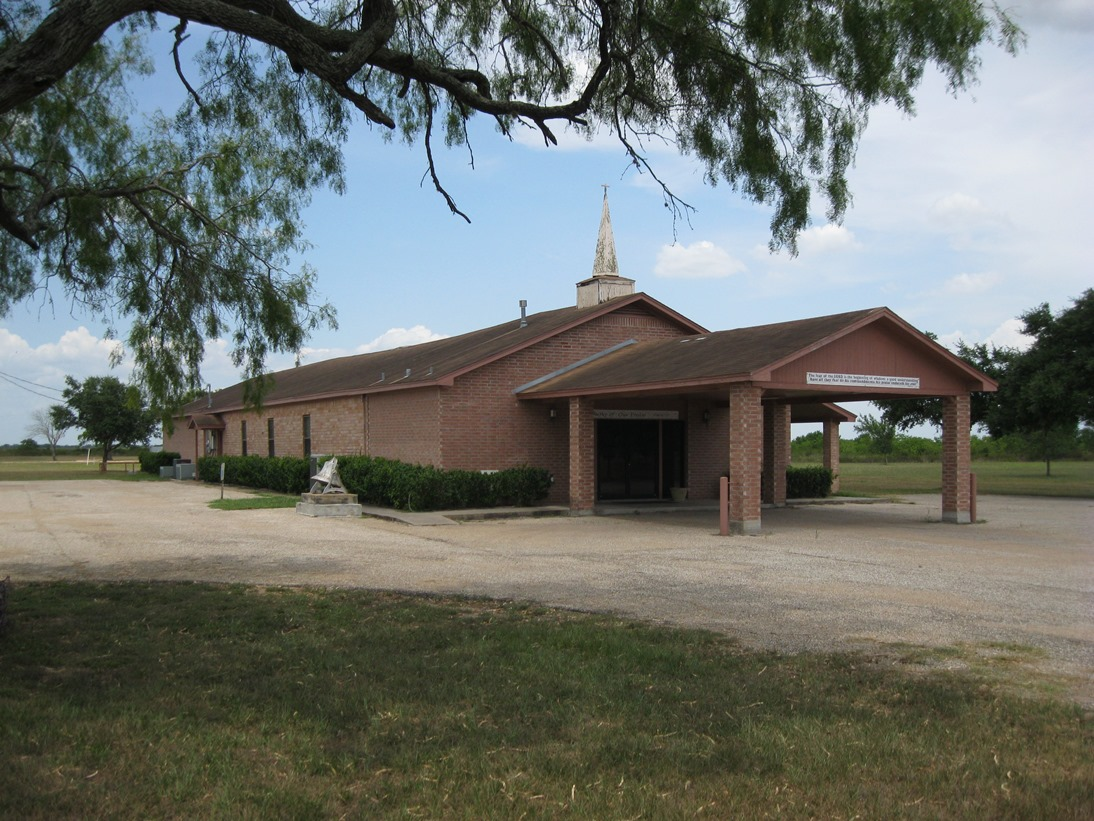
Sandridge Baptist Church at FM 102 and County Road 259

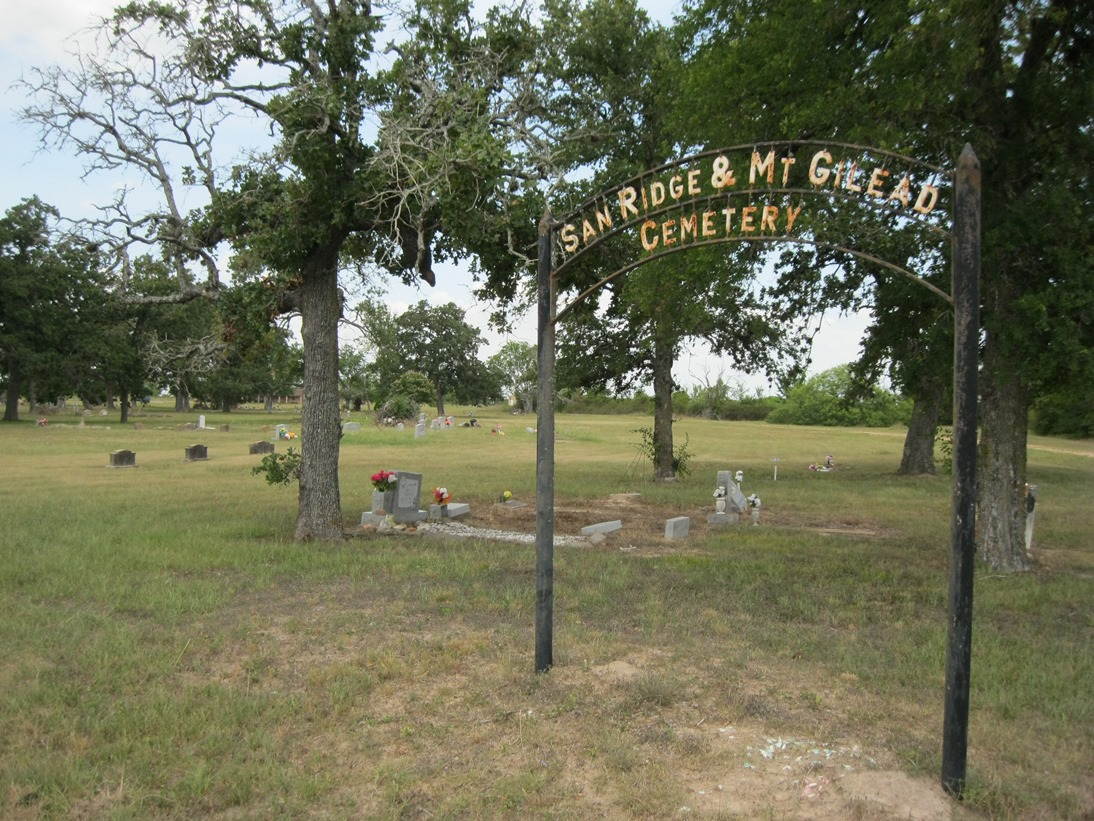
Sand Ridge and Mt Gilead Cemetery on FM 102

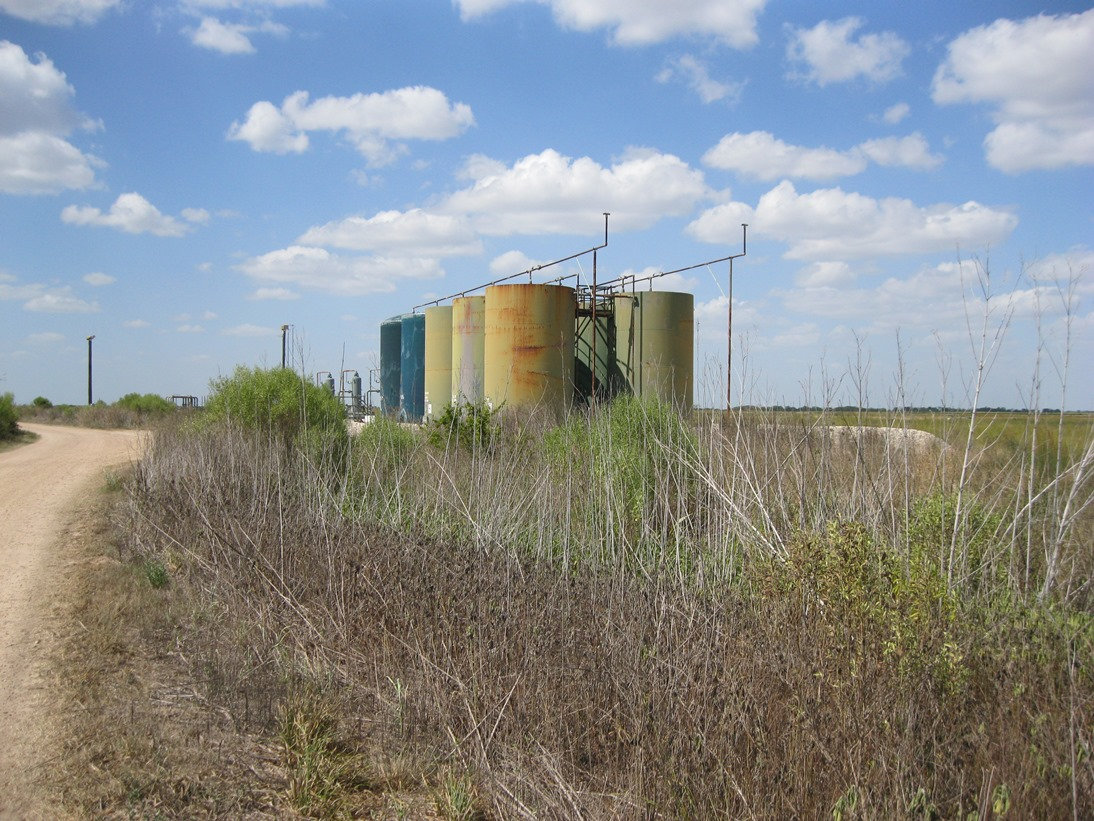
Oil well on County Road 259 north of Sand Ridge
