= Congregation Shearith Israel (Wharton, Texas) =

Former synagogue in Wharton, Texas, United States

- Location of the former synagogue in Texas

Religion
- Affiliation: Judaism (former)
- Ecclesiastical or organizational status: Synagogue (1899–2002)
- Status: Closed (as a synagogue); Destroyed (2010)

Location
- Location: Wharton, Texas
- Country: United States
- Interactive map of Congregation Shearith Israel
- Coordinates: 29°19′09″N 96°05′36″W

Architecture
- Type: Synagogue
- Established: 1899 (as a congregation)
- Completed: 1956
- Destroyed: September 26, 2010 (by arson)

Congregation Shearith Israel was a Jewish Texan community in Wharton, Texas. This rural Texan community held Jewish services for over 100 years (1899-2002).

== Community history ==
Jewish immigrants, arriving as early as the 1850s, established additional businesses and began the Congregation Shearith Israel, the only synagogue in a three-county area. A first synagogue building was erected on S. Rusk Street in 1921. Although centered in the town of Wharton, the community has members in two counties adjacent to Wharton County and the towns of Bay City, El Campo, Edna, East Bernard, Palacios and Boling. The community has over a century of Jewish history and held for many years, the Shearith Israel annual barbecue. This event would be attended by many from the three county area. The present synagogue, holder of an historic landmark, was built in 1956 on Old Lane City Road. A Jewish cemetery was established on N. Alabama Rd. in 1937. The synagogue received a historical marker in 1988.

The synagogue held its last service, led by Rabbi Jerome Cohen, in 2002. Worship services began in about 1899.

The Shearith Israel synagogue building (built in 1956) was destroyed by a fire intentionally set by two local teenagers, on Sunday, September 26, 2010 (the third day of the Jewish holiday of Sukkot, also known as the Feast of Booths).
