= Lane City, Texas =

- Unincorporated community
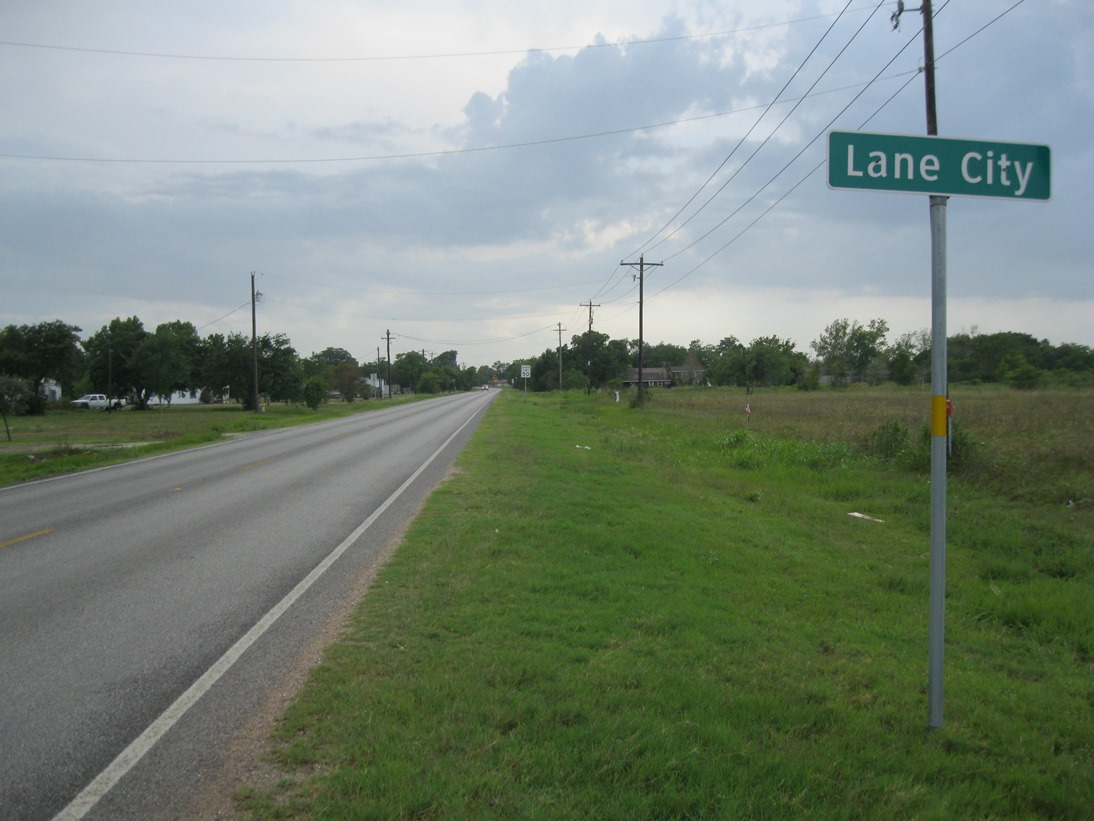
- Lane City sign on FM 442 looking southwest

- Location within Texas Location within the United States
- Coordinates: 29°12′58″N 96°01′35″W
- Country: United States
- State: Texas
- County: Wharton
- Elevation: 85 ft (26 m)
- Time zone: UTC-6 (Central (CST))
  - Summer (DST): UTC-5 (CDT)
- Area code: 979
- GNIS feature ID: 1360924

Lane City is an unincorporated community in Wharton County, Texas, United States. According to the Handbook of Texas, the community had an estimated population of 111 in 2000. It is located within the Greater Houston metro area.

== History ==
On December 2, 1953, an F2 tornado struck Lane City, pushing two farmhouses off their foundations. It caused $2,500 in damages.

Lane City has a post office with the ZIP code 77453.

== Geography ==
Lane City is situated on Texas State Highway 60 on the Atchison, Topeka and Santa Fe Railway, 10 mi (16 km) southeast of Wharton and 15 mi (24 km) north of Bay City in southeastern Wharton County. It is also three miles east of the Colorado River.

== Education ==
Lane City had its own school in 1909. In 1948, a school consolidation election failed, but students from Lane City were allowed to attend Wharton High School, as Lane City had no high school teachers. It joined the Wharton Independent School District in 1957.

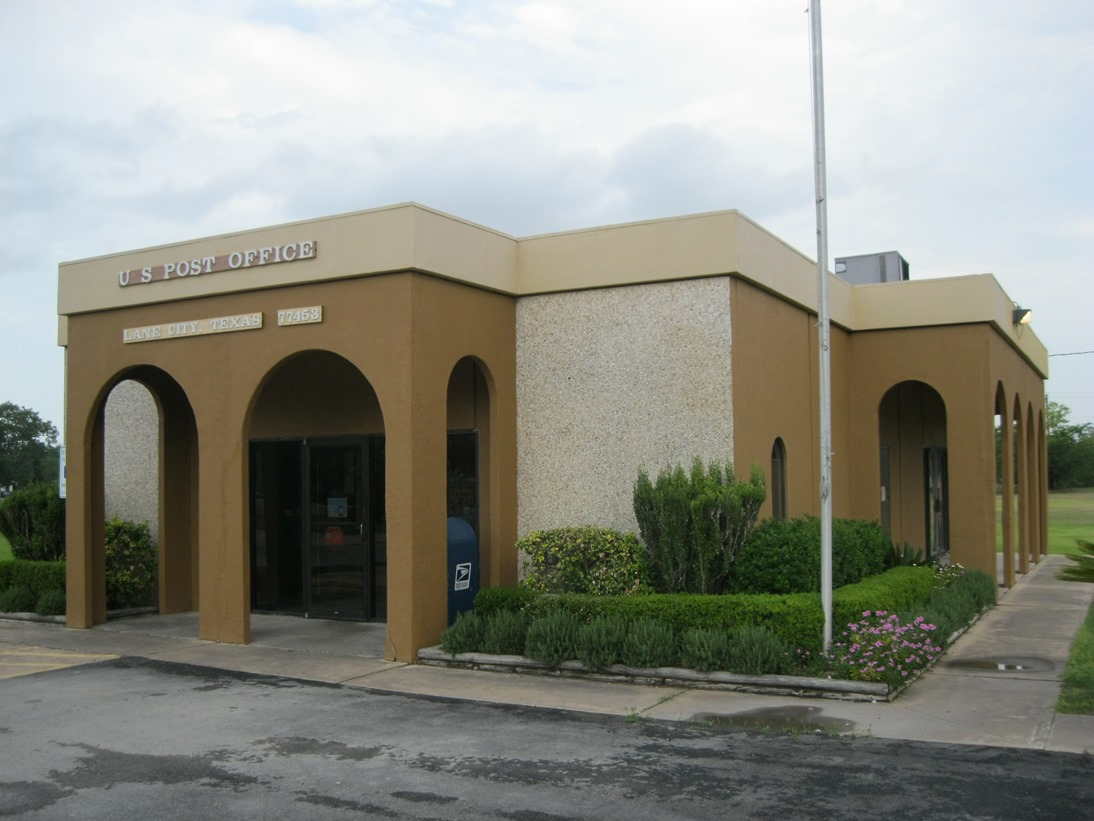
US Post Office in Lane City
