= Wharton County, Texas =

County in Texas, United States

- County
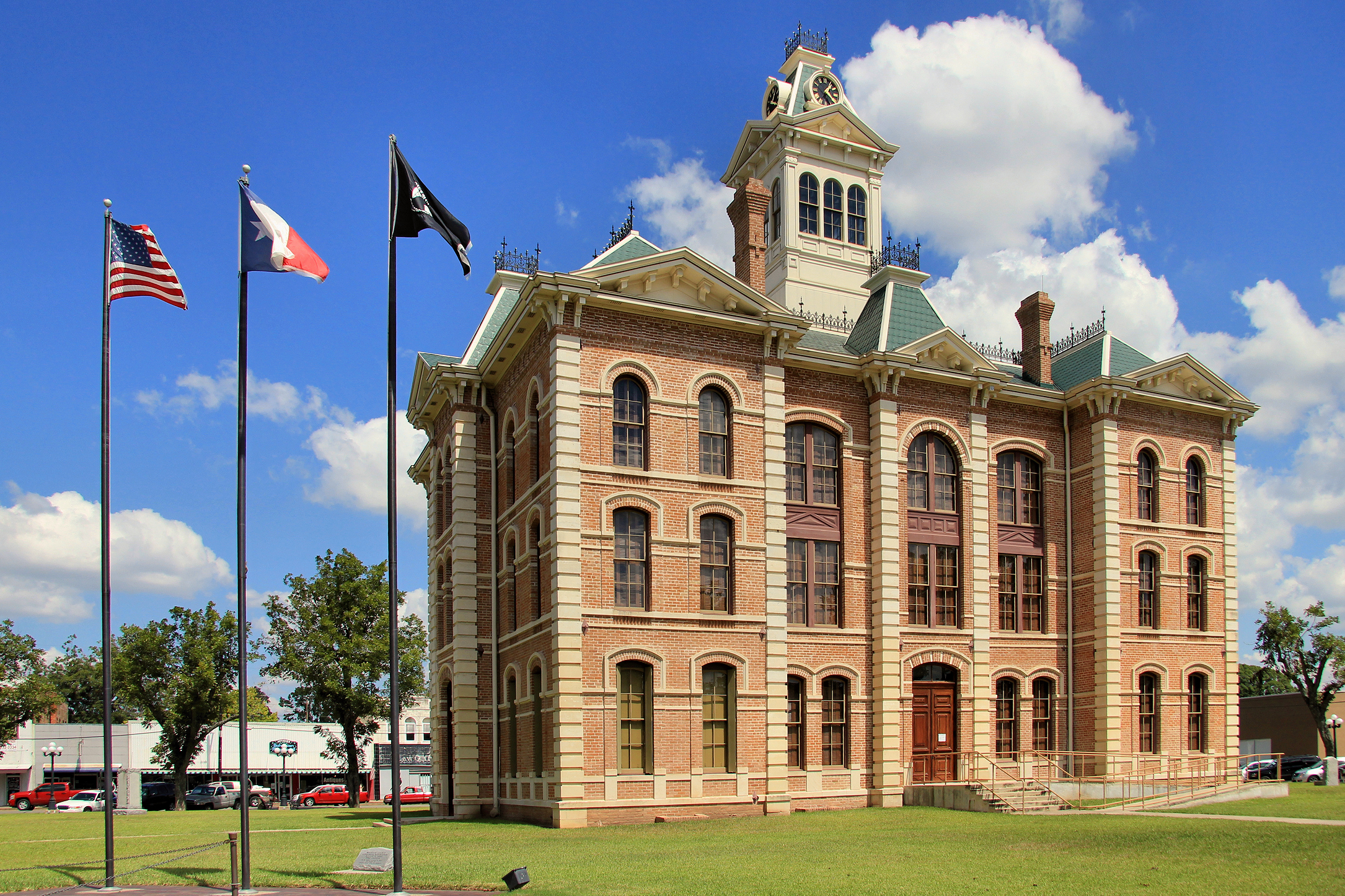
- The Wharton County Courthouse in Wharton

- Location within the U.S. state of Texas
- Coordinates: 29°17′N 96°13′W
- Country: United States
- State: Texas
- Founded: 1846
- Named for: William H. Wharton and John Austin Wharton
- Seat: Wharton
- Largest city: El Campo

Area
  - Total: 1,094 sq mi (2,830 km^{2})
  - Land: 1,086 sq mi (2,810 km^{2})
  - Water: 8.2 sq mi (21 km^{2}) 0.8%

Population (2020)
  - Total: 41,570
  - Estimate (2025): 42,060 ▲
  - Density: 38.28/sq mi (14.78/km^{2})
- Time zone: UTC−6 (Central)
  - Summer (DST): UTC−5 (CDT)
- Congressional district: 22nd
- Website: www.co.wharton.tx.us

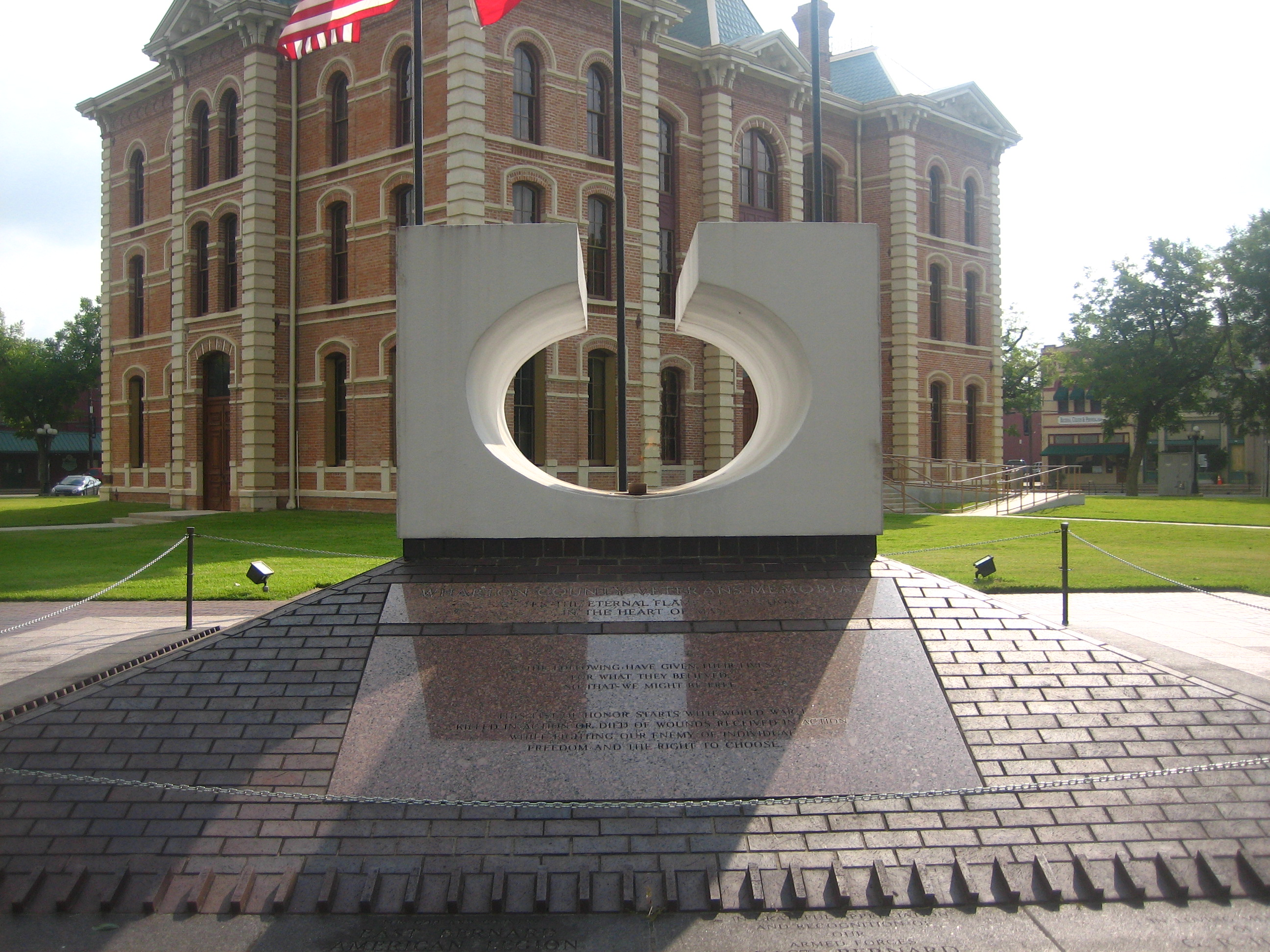
Veterans Memorial with eternal flame (not visible in photo) at Wharton County Courthouse

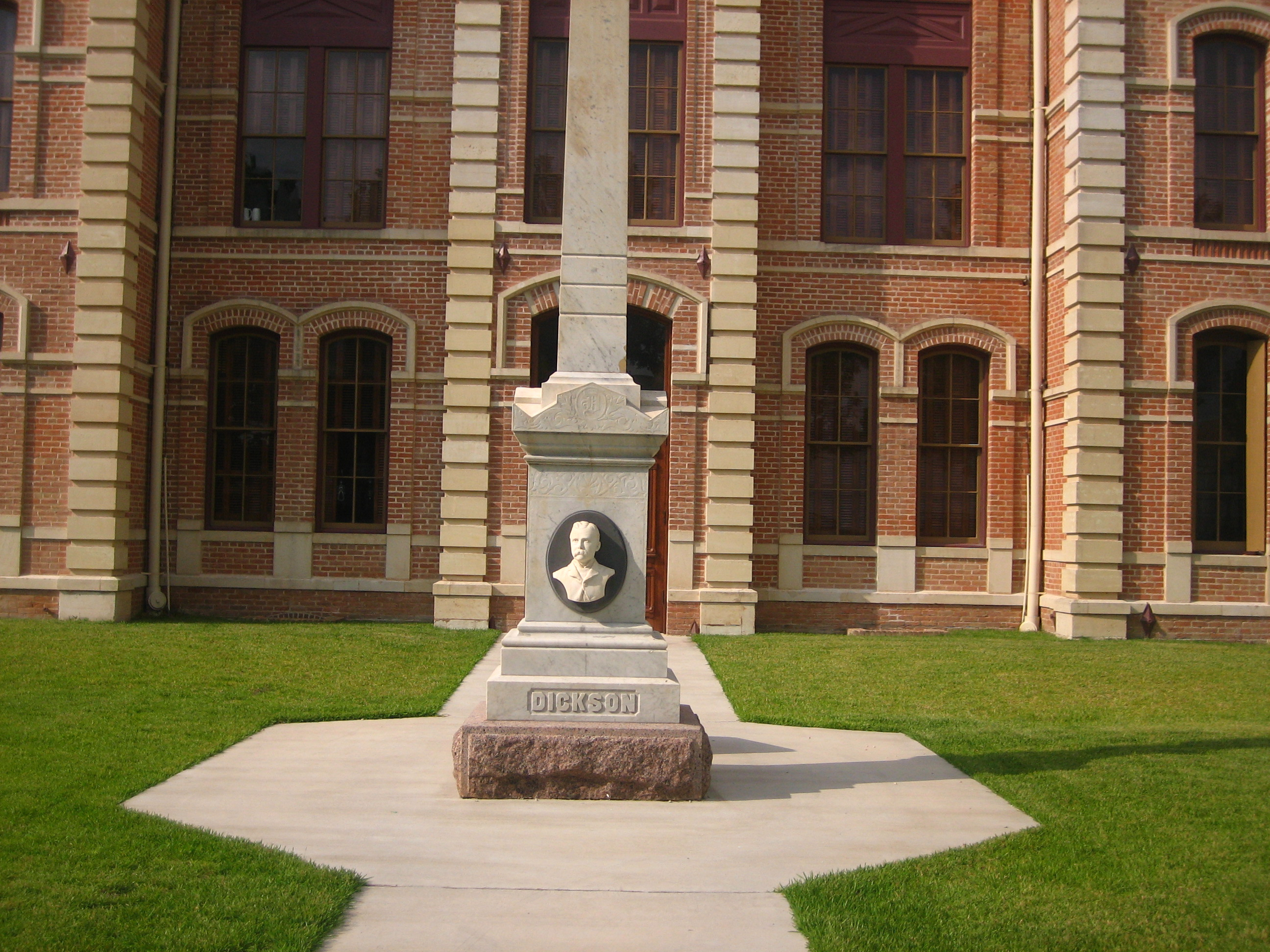
Memorial to Sheriff Hamilton B. Dickson of Wharton County who served during the 1880s and was killed in an ambush in the line of duty.

Wharton County is a county located in the U.S. state of Texas. As of the 2020 census, its population was 41,570. Its county seat is Wharton. The county was named for brothers William H. Wharton and John Austin Wharton.

Wharton County comprises the El Campo, TX Micropolitan statistical area, which is also included in the Houston-The Woodlands, TX Combined Statistical Area.

== Geography ==
According to the U.S. Census Bureau, the county has a total area of 1,094 square miles (2,830 km^{2}), of which 1,086 square miles (2,810 km^{2}) is land and 8.2 square miles (21 km^{2}) (0.8%) is water.

The county is about 130 miles (210 km) southeast of Austin.

=== Adjacent counties ===
- Austin County (north)
- Fort Bend County (northeast)
- Brazoria County (east)
- Matagorda County (southeast)
- Jackson County (southwest)
- Colorado County (northwest)

== Demographics ==
Historical population
Census	Pop.	Note	%±
1850	1,752		—
1860	3,380		92.9%
1870	3,426		1.4%
1880	4,459		30.2%
1890	7,584		70.1%
1900	16,942		123.4%
1910	21,123		24.7%
1920	24,288		15.0%
1930	29,681		22.2%
1940	36,158		21.8%
1950	36,077		−0.2%
1960	38,152		5.8%
1970	36,729		−3.7%
1980	40,242		9.6%
1990	39,955		−0.7%
2000	41,188		3.1%
2010	41,280		0.2%
2020	41,570		0.7%
2025 (est.)	42,060	▲	1.2%
U.S. Decennial Census; 1850–2010 2010 2020

=== 2020 census ===
As of the 2020 census, the county had a population of 41,570. The median age was 39.5 years. 24.7% of residents were under the age of 18 and 18.4% of residents were 65 years of age or older. For every 100 females there were 97.9 males, and for every 100 females age 18 and over there were 95.8 males age 18 and over.

The racial makeup of the county was 55.1% White, 13.7% Black or African American, 0.7% American Indian and Alaska Native, 0.5% Asian, <0.1% Native Hawaiian and Pacific Islander, 14.7% from some other race, and 15.4% from two or more races. Hispanic or Latino residents of any race comprised 40.8% of the population.

52.5% of residents lived in urban areas, while 47.5% lived in rural areas.

There were 15,446 households in the county, of which 33.6% had children under the age of 18 living in them. Of all households, 49.4% were married-couple households, 18.2% were households with a male householder and no spouse or partner present, and 26.9% were households with a female householder and no spouse or partner present. About 25.2% of all households were made up of individuals and 12.3% had someone living alone who was 65 years of age or older.

There were 17,296 housing units, of which 10.7% were vacant. Among occupied housing units, 68.7% were owner-occupied and 31.3% were renter-occupied. The homeowner vacancy rate was 1.5% and the rental vacancy rate was 7.0%.

=== Racial and ethnic composition ===
Wharton County, Texas – Racial and ethnic composition Note: the US Census treats Hispanic/Latino as an ethnic category. This table excludes Latinos from the racial categories and assigns them to a separate category. Hispanics/Latinos may be of any race.
Race / Ethnicity (NH = Non-Hispanic)	Pop 1980	Pop 1990	Pop 2000	Pop 2010	Pop 2020	% 1980	% 1990	% 2000	% 2010	% 2020
White alone (NH)	24,642	23,501	21,832	19,681	18,130	61.23%	58.82%	53.01%	47.68%	43.61%
Black or African American alone (NH)	6,605	6,166	6,060	5,668	5,469	16.41%	15.43%	14.71%	13.73%	13.16%
Native American or Alaska Native alone (NH)	55	17	59	62	69	0.14%	0.04%	0.14%	0.15%	0.17%
Asian alone (NH)	40	103	113	154	164	0.10%	0.26%	0.27%	0.37%	0.39%
Native Hawaiian or Pacific Islander alone (NH)	x	x	18	2	0	x	x	0.04%	0.00%	0.00%
Other race alone (NH)	147	65	15	26	104	0.37%	0.16%	0.04%	0.06%	0.25%
Mixed race or Multiracial (NH)	x	x	203	242	667	x	x	0.49%	0.59%	1.60%
Hispanic or Latino (any race)	8,753	10,103	12,888	15,445	16,967	21.75%	25.29%	31.29%	37.42%	40.82%
Total	40,242	39,955	41,188	41,280	41,570	100.00%	100.00%	100.00%	100.00%	100.00%

=== 2000 census ===
As of the 2000 census, there were 41,188 people, 14,799 households, and 10,744 families residing in the county. The population density was 38 people per square mile (15 people/km^{2}). There were 16,606 housing units at an average density of 15 units per square mile (5.8 units/km^{2}). The racial makeup of the county was 69.01% White, 14.95% Black or African American, 0.37% Native American, 0.31% Asian, 0.06% Pacific Islander, 13.65% from other races, and 1.64% from two or more races. 31.29% of the population were Hispanic or Latino of any race. 12.8% were of Czech, 11.0% German and 7.0% American ancestry according to Census 2000. 73.8% spoke English, 24.0% Spanish and 2.0% Czech as their first language.

There were 14,799 households, out of which 35.70% had children under the age of 18 living with them, 55.50% were married couples living together, 12.50% had a female householder with no husband present, and 27.40% were non-families. 24.40% of all households were made up of individuals, and 12.40% had someone living alone who was 65 years of age or older. The average household size was 2.73 and the average family size was 3.26.

In the county, the population was spread out, with 28.70% under the age of 18, 9.30% from 18 to 24, 26.50% from 25 to 44, 21.50% from 45 to 64, and 13.90% who were 65 years of age or older. The median age was 35 years. For every 100 females there were 96.90 males. For every 100 females age 18 and over, there were 92.70 males.

The median income for a household in the county was $32,208, and the median income for a family was $39,919. Males had a median income of $30,480 versus $20,101 for females. The per capita income for the county was $15,388. About 13.30% of families and 16.50% of the population were below the poverty line, including 18.50% of those under age 18 and 17.70% of those age 65 or over.

== Legacy of slavery ==
A map commissioned by the United States government in the 1860s, and sold by the Union Army for the benefit of wounded troops, indicates that, based on data from the 1860 national census, 80.9% of the population of Wharton County was enslaved. The county then had a total of 3,380 people. This was the highest proportion of slaves in a single county in the state of Texas. Demand related to development of new areas for cultivation had caused the number of slaves overall in the state to triple between 1850 and 1860, from 58,000 to 182,566.

== Transportation ==
=== Airports ===
El Campo Metropolitan Airport, a general aviation airport, is located in unincorporated Wharton County southwest of El Campo.

Wharton Regional Airport, also a general aviation airport, is located in the extreme southwestern portion of Wharton.

=== Major highways ===
- U.S. Highway 59
  - Interstate 69 is currently under construction and will follow the current route of U.S. 59 in most places.
- U.S. Highway 90 Alternate
- State Highway 60
- State Highway 71
- Loop 523
- Loop 524
- Loop 526
- Farm to Market Road 102
- Farm to Market Road 442
- Farm to Market Road 1160
- Farm to Market Road 1301

== Politics ==
Wharton County is a strongly Republican county in the 21st century.

United States presidential election results for Wharton County, Texas
Year	Republican		Democratic		Third party(ies)	
Year	No.	%	No.	%	No.	%
1912	109	8.80%	793	64.00%	337	27.20%
1916	351	25.05%	948	67.67%	102	7.28%
1920	852	36.06%	836	35.38%	675	28.57%
1924	858	28.71%	2,020	67.58%	111	3.71%
1928	1,151	42.69%	1,545	57.31%	0	0.00%
1932	405	10.68%	3,357	88.53%	30	0.79%
1936	307	9.15%	3,034	90.43%	14	0.42%
1940	760	16.03%	3,976	83.88%	4	0.08%
1944	529	10.49%	3,754	74.45%	759	15.05%
1948	1,354	28.90%	2,811	60.00%	520	11.10%
1952	5,232	56.51%	4,022	43.44%	5	0.05%
1956	4,714	57.47%	3,439	41.92%	50	0.61%
1960	3,387	40.04%	5,004	59.16%	67	0.79%
1964	2,775	30.76%	6,234	69.11%	11	0.12%
1968	3,773	37.89%	4,304	43.22%	1,882	18.90%
1972	6,271	64.27%	3,481	35.68%	5	0.05%
1976	4,682	43.99%	5,914	55.56%	48	0.45%
1980	6,598	55.18%	5,138	42.97%	222	1.86%
1984	8,495	62.54%	5,072	37.34%	17	0.13%
1988	6,978	53.71%	5,935	45.69%	78	0.60%
1992	5,503	43.00%	4,643	36.28%	2,651	20.72%
1996	6,163	50.38%	5,176	42.31%	895	7.32%
2000	8,455	62.97%	4,838	36.03%	133	0.99%
2004	9,288	66.16%	4,702	33.49%	49	0.35%
2008	9,431	65.41%	4,937	34.24%	50	0.35%
2012	9,750	69.21%	4,235	30.06%	102	0.72%
2016	10,149	68.89%	4,238	28.77%	345	2.34%
2020	11,926	71.09%	4,694	27.98%	156	0.93%
2024	12,439	75.60%	3,910	23.76%	104	0.63%

United States Senate election results for Wharton County, Texas1
Year	Republican		Democratic		Third party(ies)	
Year	No.	%	No.	%	No.	%
2024	11,915	73.00%	4,150	25.42%	258	1.58%

United States Senate election results for Wharton County, Texas2
Year	Republican		Democratic		Third party(ies)	
Year	No.	%	No.	%	No.	%
2020	11,832	71.19%	4,513	27.15%	276	1.66%

Texas Gubernatorial election results for Wharton County
Year	Republican		Democratic		Third party(ies)	
Year	No.	%	No.	%	No.	%
2022	9,354	76.96%	2,697	22.19%	103	0.85%

== Communities ==
=== Cities ===
- East Bernard
- El Campo
- Wharton (county seat)

=== Census-designated places ===
- Boling
- Hungerford
- Iago
- Louise

=== Unincorporated communities ===
- Bonus
- Burr
- Danevang
- Dinsmore
- Don-Tol
- Egypt
- Elm Grove
- Glen Flora
- Hillje
- Lane City
- Lissie
- Magnet
- Newgulf
- New Taiton
- Pierce
- Sand Ridge
- Spanish Camp

=== Ghost towns ===
- Dorman
- Hahn
- Jones Creek
- Mackay
- Nottawa
- Peach Creek
- Plainview
- Preston
- Round Mott
- Sorrelle
- Taiton
- Waterville

== Education ==
School districts include:

- Boling Independent School District
- East Bernard Independent School District
- El Campo Independent School District
- Hallettsville Independent School District
- Louise Independent School District
- Wharton Independent School District

The Texas Legislature assigns all of Wharton County to Wharton County Junior College.

== See also ==
- Congregation Shearith Israel
- List of museums in the Texas Gulf Coast
- National Register of Historic Places listings in Wharton County, Texas
- Recorded Texas Historic Landmarks in Wharton County
- 20th Century Technology Museum
