= Nikki Araguz Loyd =

American gay marriage activist (1975–2019)

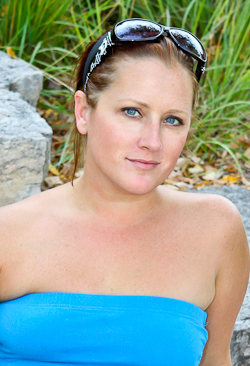
- Araguz Loyd in 2011
- Born: June 4, 1975; California, US
- Died: November 6, 2019 (aged 44); Humble, Texas, US
- Occupations: Activist, author, public speaker
- Known for: Same-sex marriage activism
- Spouses: Emilio Mata (m. 1995; div. 2007); Thomas Trevino Araguz III (m. 2008; died 2010); William Loyd (m. 2013)

Nikki Araguz Loyd (June 4, 1975 – November 6, 2019) was an American same-sex marriage activist, author, and public speaker.

== Work and marriages ==
Loyd's media background and several years in advertising led to publishing Wharton County Living magazine.

Loyd was married three times

- Emilio Mata (m. 1995-div. 2007)
- Captain Thomas Trevino Araguz III (m. 2008-Dec. 2010)
- William Loyd (m. 2013)

Nikki lived in Houston and as of 2013 was remarried to William Loyd, and with him ran an art gallery.

== Death of second husband and legal fight ==
Married on August 23, 2008, Nikki and Thomas Araguz lived in Wharton, Texas, with Thomas' two sons from a prior marriage. Thomas attended classes at Wharton County Junior College and earned certifications in the Police Academy, Fire Academy and was an EMT. Nikki worked as a Sales Executive and Sales Manager for a Houston GLBT magazine. Thomas served Wharton as a volunteer firefighter, and after marrying Nikki, became a Sheriff's Deputy and completed courses required for paid firefighters.

On July 3, 2010, Captain Araguz answered the call to fight a fire at an egg plant in Boling, Texas and went missing for several hours. At the time of the fire Nikki was on a business trip and was not made aware he was missing. Nikki learned of Thomas's death from a posting on a social networking site by another fireman's wife. Upon her return to Wharton, Nikki's in-laws prevented her from seeing her stepchildren.

The morning after Thomas's burial, Nikki learned that two separate lawsuits had been filed by his family in an attempt to take away her benefits as a firefighter's spouse, though Thomas had specifically named her as beneficiary in one instance. Thomas's family claimed that since Araguz was "born a man", she was not female at the time of her marriage to Thomas and that the marriage should be invalidated. On May 26, 2011, State District Judge Randy Clapp ruled in favor of Thomas's family and nullified the marriage.

Araguz's widow's benefits were withheld during litigation until a final outcome. She appealed unsuccessfully in court on November 14, 2011, hoping to have Judge Clapp's ruling overturned. On January 25, 2012, Araguz pleaded guilty to stealing a Rolex watch from a woman and was sentenced to 50 days in jail.

In February 2014, the 13th Texas Court of Appeals ruled that Araguz would get another chance to litigate the case in a state district courtroom. Specifically, the appellate court voided the state district court judge's summary judgment in favor of Thomas Araguz's parents and ordered the case returned to the original courtroom for further litigation.

In 2015, a state appeals court ruling by the 13th Texas Court of Appeals sent the case of Araguz back to the Wharton County judge who originally voided the marriage because Texas did not recognize same-sex marriage. Later in 2015, a state district judge in Texas ruled that Araguz was legally married to Thomas Araguz at the time of his death in 2010.

== Later life and death ==
Nikki remained active in the fight for same-sex marriage until her death, aged 44, at home in Humble, Texas on November 6, 2019. Her husband William Loyd announced her death. According to the medical examiner, she died of an accidental drug overdose. Her memorial was attended by hundreds of people and featured displays of some of her intricate clothing.
