= Dinsmore, Texas =

- Unincorporated community
- Location within Texas Location within the United States
- Coordinates: 29°19′2″N 96°3′2″W
- Country: United States
- State: Texas
- County: Wharton
- Elevation: 95 ft (29 m)
- Time zone: UTC-6 (Central (CST))
  - Summer (DST): UTC-5 (CDT)
- Area code: 979
- GNIS feature ID: 1356039

Dinsmore is an unincorporated community in Wharton County, Texas, United States. According to the Handbook of Texas, the community had a population of 250 in the early 1990s. It is located within the Greater Houston metropolitan area.

== Geography ==
Dinsmore is located on Farm to Market Road 1301, 2 mi (3.2 km) east of Wharton in Wharton County.

== Education ==
Today, the community is served by the Wharton Independent School District.
