= Wharton, Texas =

- City
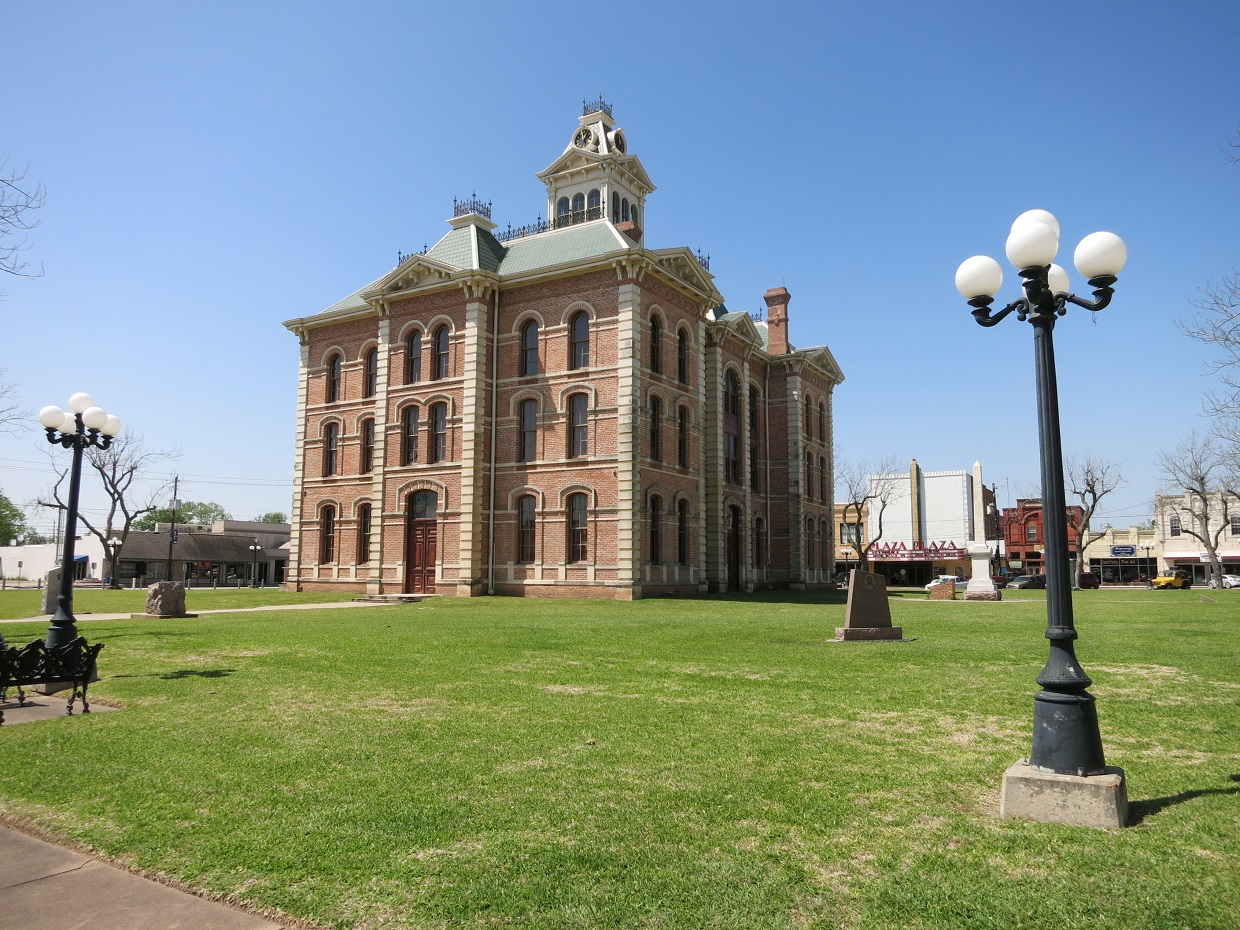
- Wharton County Courthouse

- Location within Texas Location within the United States
- Coordinates: 29°18′42″N 96°6′10″W
- Country: United States
- State: Texas
- County: Wharton

Area
  - Total: 8.28 sq mi (21.45 km^{2})
  - Land: 8.25 sq mi (21.36 km^{2})
  - Water: 0.035 sq mi (0.09 km^{2})
- Elevation: 102 ft (31 m)

Population (2020)
  - Total: 8,627
  - Density: 1,047.5/sq mi (404.44/km^{2})
- Time zone: UTC-6 (Central (CST))
  - Summer (DST): UTC-5 (CDT)
- ZIP code: 77488
- Area code: 979
- FIPS code: 48-78136
- GNIS feature ID: 1371316
- Website: www.cityofwharton.com

Wharton is a city in and the county seat of Wharton County, Texas, United States. This city is 60 mi (97 km) southwest of Houston. Its population was 8,832 at the 2010 census and 8,627 at the 2020 census. Wharton is located on the Colorado River of Texas. U.S. Highway 59 passes west of it.

== History ==
The area now known as Wharton was part of the Caney Run mail route established in 1838 by the Republic of Texas. The community was named after two leaders in the Anglo-American struggle for Texas independence, brothers John and William Wharton. What developed as a plantation community along the Colorado River was first settled in 1846 by some of Stephen F. Austin's original colonists. A post office was established the next year.

The first lieutenant governor of Texas, Albert Horton, was an early settler. Land for the courthouse square was donated by William Kincheloe and surveyed by Virgil Stewart and William J. E. Heard. Early settlers came from across the South: Alabama, Kentucky, Virginia, Georgia, and Mississippi.

European Jewish immigrants, arriving as early as the 1850s from Germany, established additional businesses and began the Congregation Shearith Israel, the only synagogue in a three-county area. Other settlers in the community included Swiss, German, Mexican, and Czech immigrants and, after the Civil War and emancipation, descendants of plantation slaves.

The area was first developed for agriculture, and planters used enslaved African Americans for labor before the Civil War. Early crops included potatoes, cotton, corn, rice, and sugarcane, and commercial enterprises included cattle, molasses, and sugar. At different times, the community had a cottonseed oil mill, a sugarcane factory, gristmills, cotton gins, a milk-processing plant and dairy, an ice plant, and numerous other industries. Oil and sulfur production in the outlying areas contributes to the town's economy. The population of Wharton was approximately 200 in the early 1880s.

In 1881, the New York, Texas and Mexican Railway was the first railroad to reach Wharton. More than a decade later, the Gulf, Colorado and Santa Fe was constructed to the town in 1899. These two railroads carried new settlers and stimulated businesses, increasing the population to 1,689 in 1900 and 2,346 in 1920. In 1888, the first opera house opened.

When Wharton was incorporated in 1902, most of the structures were of wood construction. A major fire on December 30 of that year destroyed a number of frame business buildings. Afterward, businessmen and the city government were convinced to use brick construction with fire walls for all buildings within the city limits and to construct a water system with fire hydrants.

A free library was established in 1902 by the New Century Club and adopted by the city in 1904. In 1935, the majority of the library inventory was given to the Wharton Public School. The first public park was dedicated in 1913, and the Wharton Chamber of Commerce organized in 1919.

The city had its greatest growth during the 1930s, despite the Great Depression, with the population increasing from 2,261 in 1930 to 4,386 in 1940. Wharton Little Theatre was organized in 1932, and Wharton County Junior College was established in 1946.

The town's population reached 5,734 in 1960 and 7,881 in 1970. A community concert series was developed in the 1960s. By the 1980s, Wharton had such diverse industries as Health-focus, the largest physical rehabilitation and therapy service in the nation; M. I. Drilling Fluids, a subsidiary of Magcobar Division of Dresser Industries; the Formosa Plastics Group, consisting of Nan Ya Plastics and J-M Manufacturing; Coastal Warehouse Limited, serving the agricultural industry; and Gulf Coast Medical Center and South Texas Medical clinics. The economy was also dependent on the county government of this seat.

In the 1980s, Horton Foote, an Academy Award-winning screenwriter and a descendant of Lieutenant Governor Horton, who was born and raised in Wharton, moved back and lived in Wharton. The Wharton County Historical Museum features exhibits on notable residents - broadcast journalist Dan Rather and Medal of Honor-recipient Roy Benavidez, as well as a wildlife collection. The Wharton population was stable at the end of the 20th century: 9,033 in 1980, 9,011 in 1990, and 9,237 in 2000. The 2010 census reported a decrease to 8,832.

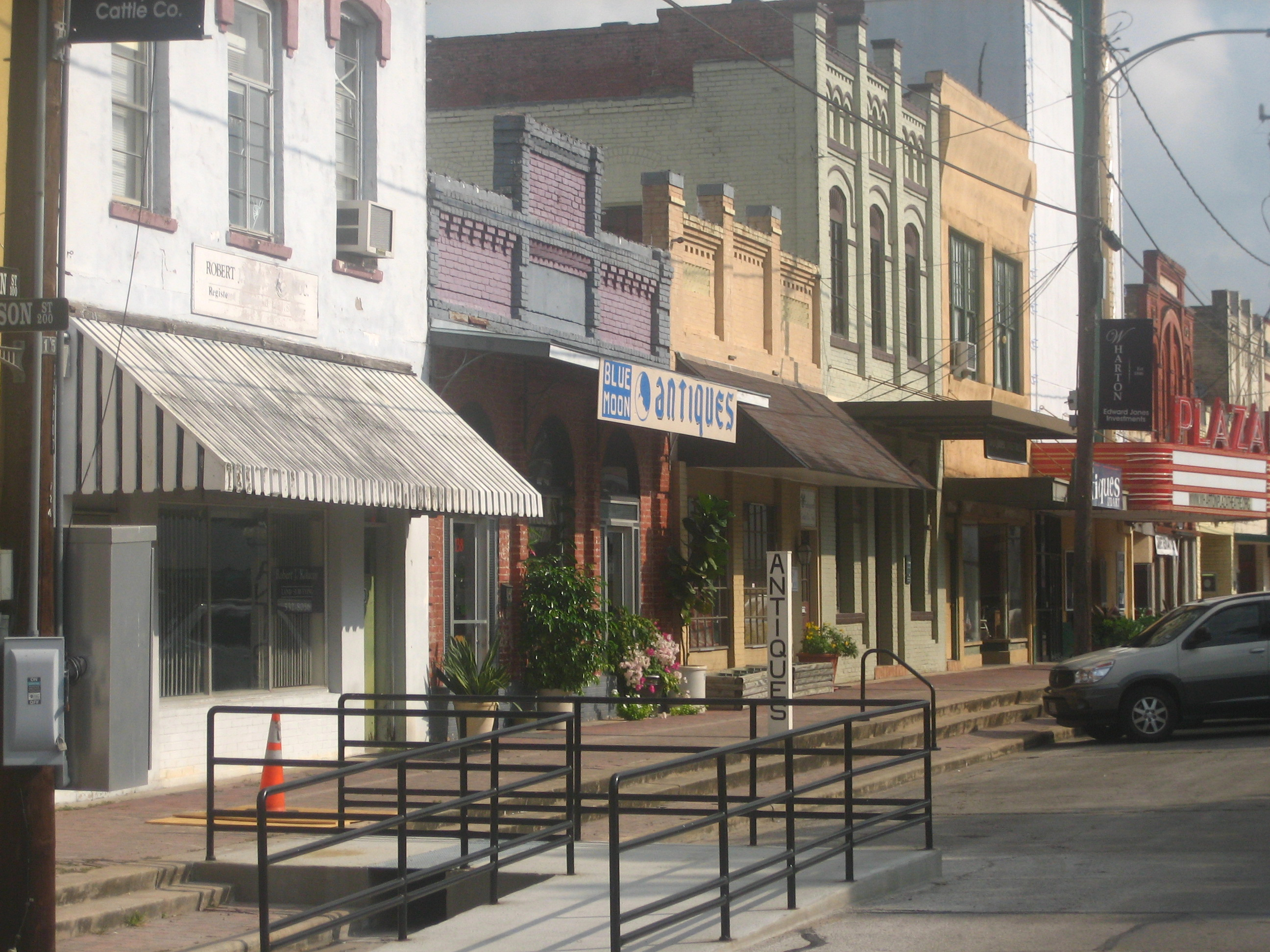
Downtown Wharton

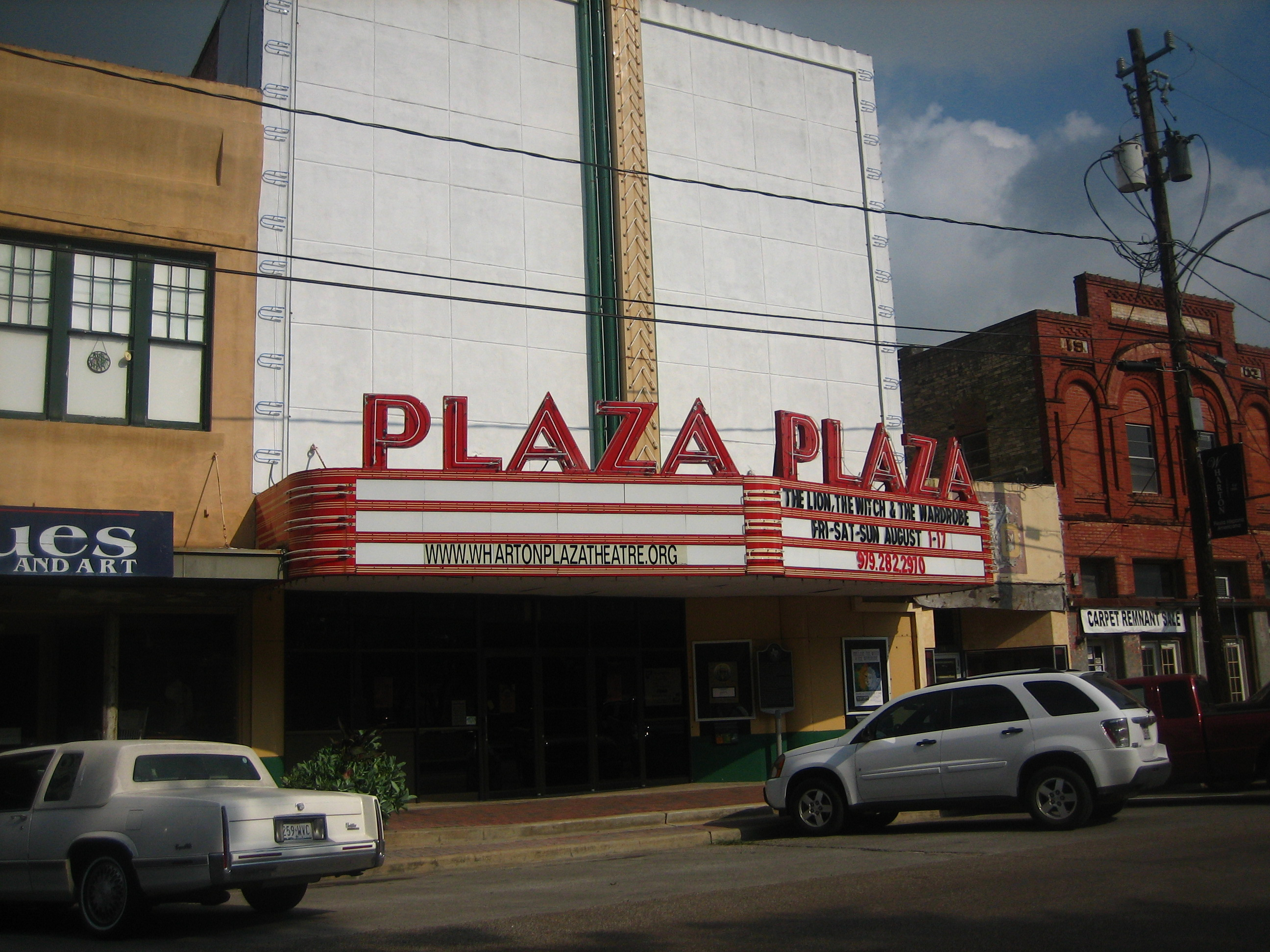
Plaza Theater

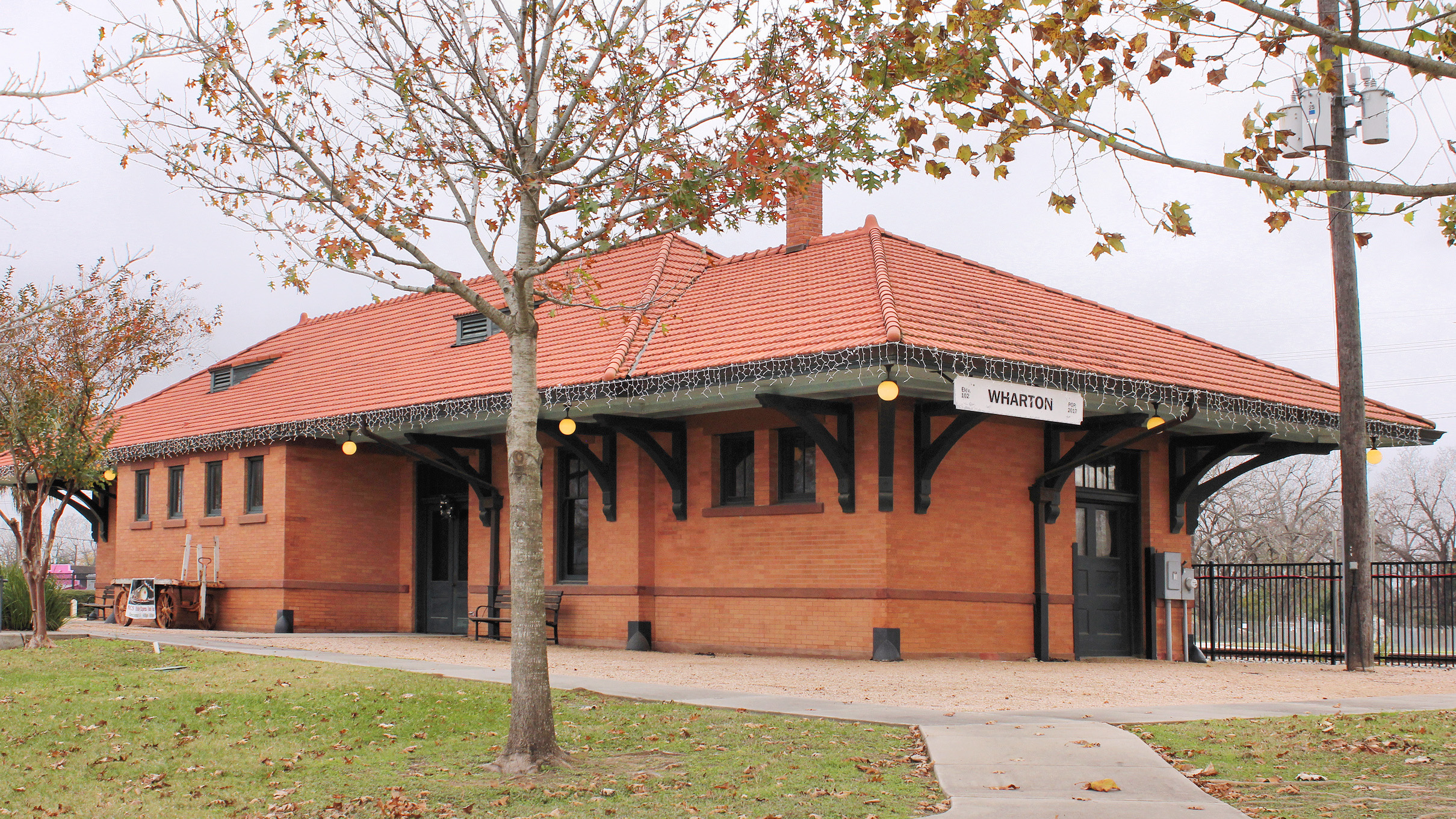
Historic railroad depot

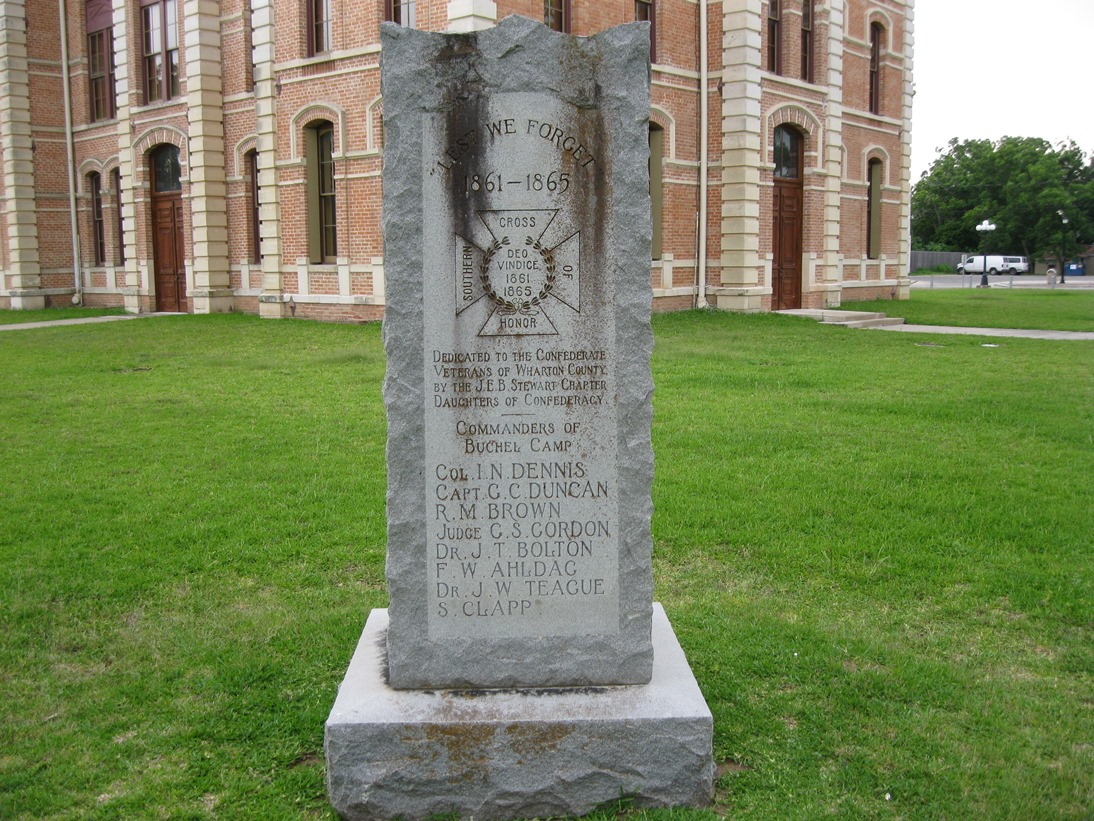
Confederate monument

== Geography ==
According to the United States Census Bureau, the city has a total area of 7.2 square miles (19 km^{2}), of which 0.14% is covered by water.

U.S. Route 59 (US 59) (Future Interstate 69) (Future I-69) passes through the west side of Wharton. To the northeast on US 59 (Future I-69) is Rosenberg in Fort Bend County, while El Campo in Wharton County is to the southwest. State Highway 60 (SH 60) passes through Wharton, heading south to Bay City and north to East Bernard. FM 102 starts on SH 60 in Wharton and goes northwest to Eagle Lake in Colorado County. FM 1301 also begins at SH 60 in Wharton and goes southeast to Boling-Iago. The Colorado River flows toward Wharton from the northwest and after passing through the city, the river's direction is more to the south.

=== Climate ===
The climate in this area is characterized by hot, humid summers and generally mild to cool winters. According to the Köppen climate classification, Wharton has a humid subtropical climate, Cfa on climate maps.

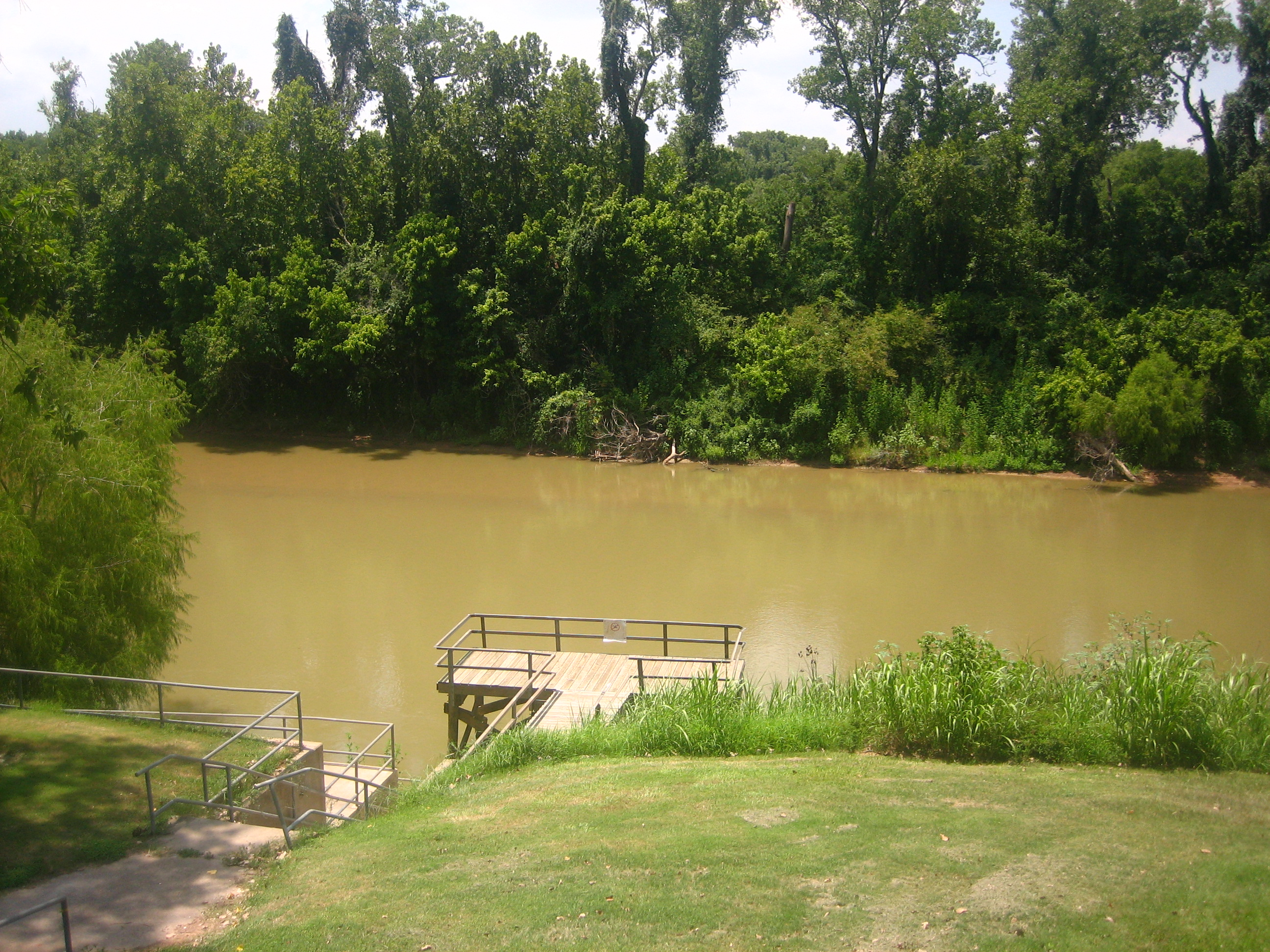
Colorado River in Wharton

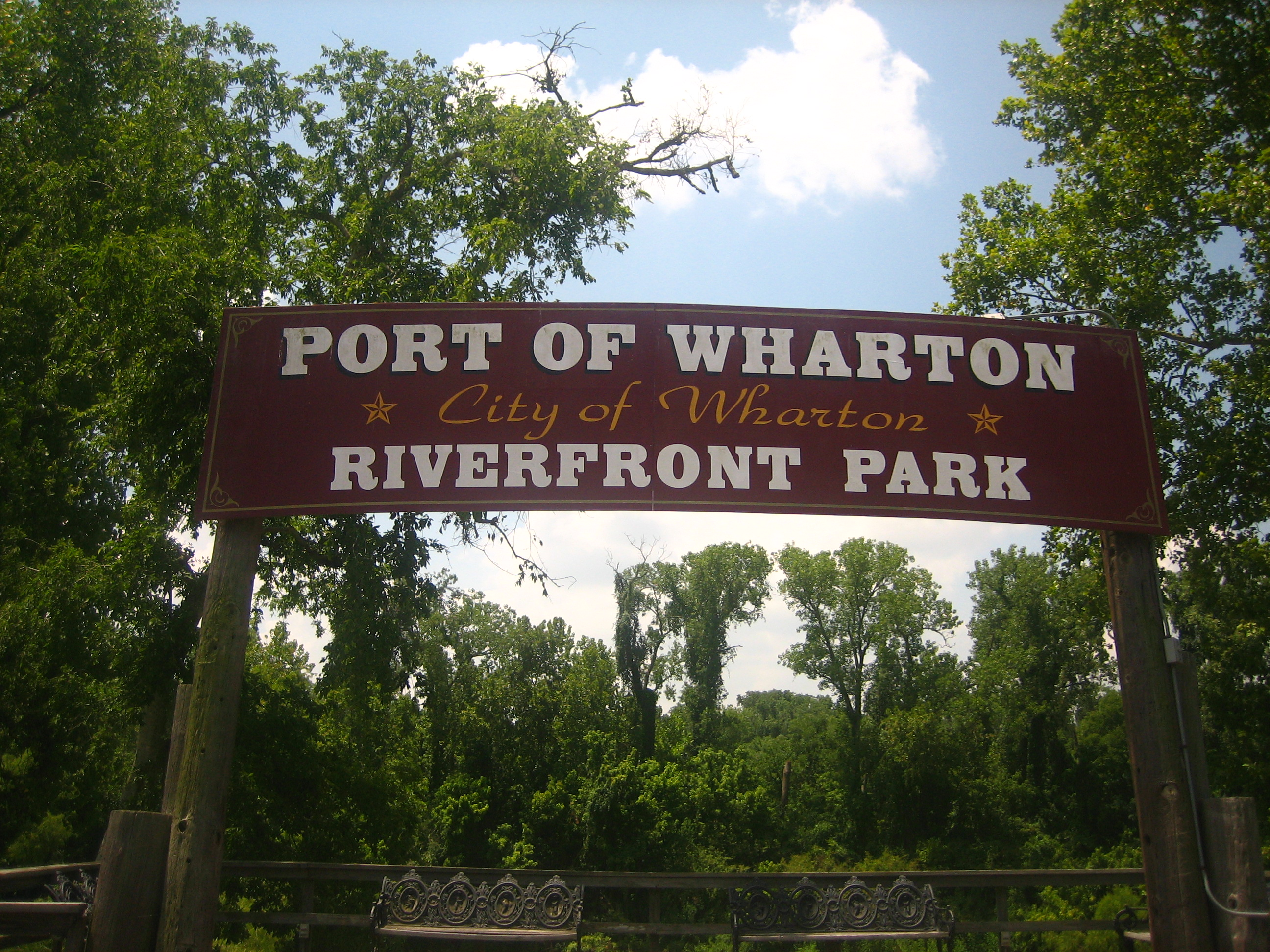
Riverfront Park

== Demographics ==
Historical population
Census	Pop.	Note	%±
1910	1,505		—
1920	2,346		55.9%
1930	2,691		14.7%
1940	4,386		63.0%
1950	4,450		1.5%
1960	5,734		28.9%
1970	7,881		37.4%
1980	9,033		14.6%
1990	9,011		−0.2%
2000	9,237		2.5%
2010	8,832		−4.4%
2020	8,627		−2.3%
U.S. Decennial Census

=== 2020 census ===
As of the 2020 census, 8,627 people, 3,386 households, and 1,840 families were residing in the city.

The median age was 38.9 years, 23.2% of residents were under the age of 18, and 18.9% of residents were 65 years of age or older. For every 100 females there were 95.8 males, and for every 100 females age 18 and over there were 91.0 males age 18 and over.

96.6% of residents lived in urban areas, while 3.4% lived in rural areas.

Of the 3,386 households in Wharton, 31.0% had children under the age of 18 living in them, 36.4% were married-couple households, 21.5% were households with a male householder and no spouse or partner present, and 36.1% were households with a female householder and no spouse or partner present. About 33.3% of all households were made up of individuals and 15.1% had someone living alone who was 65 years of age or older.

There were 3,928 housing units, of which 13.8% were vacant. The homeowner vacancy rate was 2.2% and the rental vacancy rate was 8.7%.

Racial composition as of the 2020 census
Race	Number	Percent
White	3,298	38.2%
Black or African American	2,439	28.3%
American Indian and Alaska Native	36	0.4%
Asian	53	0.6%
Native Hawaiian and Other Pacific Islander	1	0.0%
Some other race	1,391	16.1%
Two or more races	1,409	16.3%
Hispanic or Latino (of any race)	3,531	40.9%

=== 2000 census ===
As of the 2000 census, 9,237 people, 3,539 households, and 2,268 families resided in the city. The population density was 1,278.3 inhabitants per square mile (493.6/km^{2}). The 4,000 housing units averaged 553.6 per square mile (213.6/km^{2}). The racial makeup of the city was 56.33% White, 26.43% African American, 0.41% Native American, 0.71% Asian, 0.16% Pacific Islander, 14.18% from other races, and 1.78% from two or more races. Hispanics or Latinos of any race were 31.08% of the population.

Of the 3,539 households, 31.5% had children under 18 living with them, 44.2% were married couples living together, 15.7% had a female householder with no husband present, and 35.9% were not families. About 31.8% of all households were made up of individuals, and 15.3% had someone living alone who was 65 or older. The average household size was 2.51, and the average family size was 3.21.

In the city, the population was distributed as 27.2% under 18, 11.1% from 18 to 24, 25.3% from 25 to 44, 20.3% from 45 to 64, and 16.2% who were 65 or older. The median age was 34 years. For every 100 females, there were 89.3 males. For every 100 females 18 and over, there were 83.1 males.

The median income for a household in the city was $26,704, and for a family was $34,543. Males had a median income of $30,423 versus $20,460 for females. The per capita income for the city was $13,993. About 17.3% of families and 22.2% of the population were below the poverty line, including 22.3% of those under 18 and 21.7% of those 65 or over.

== Government and infrastructure ==
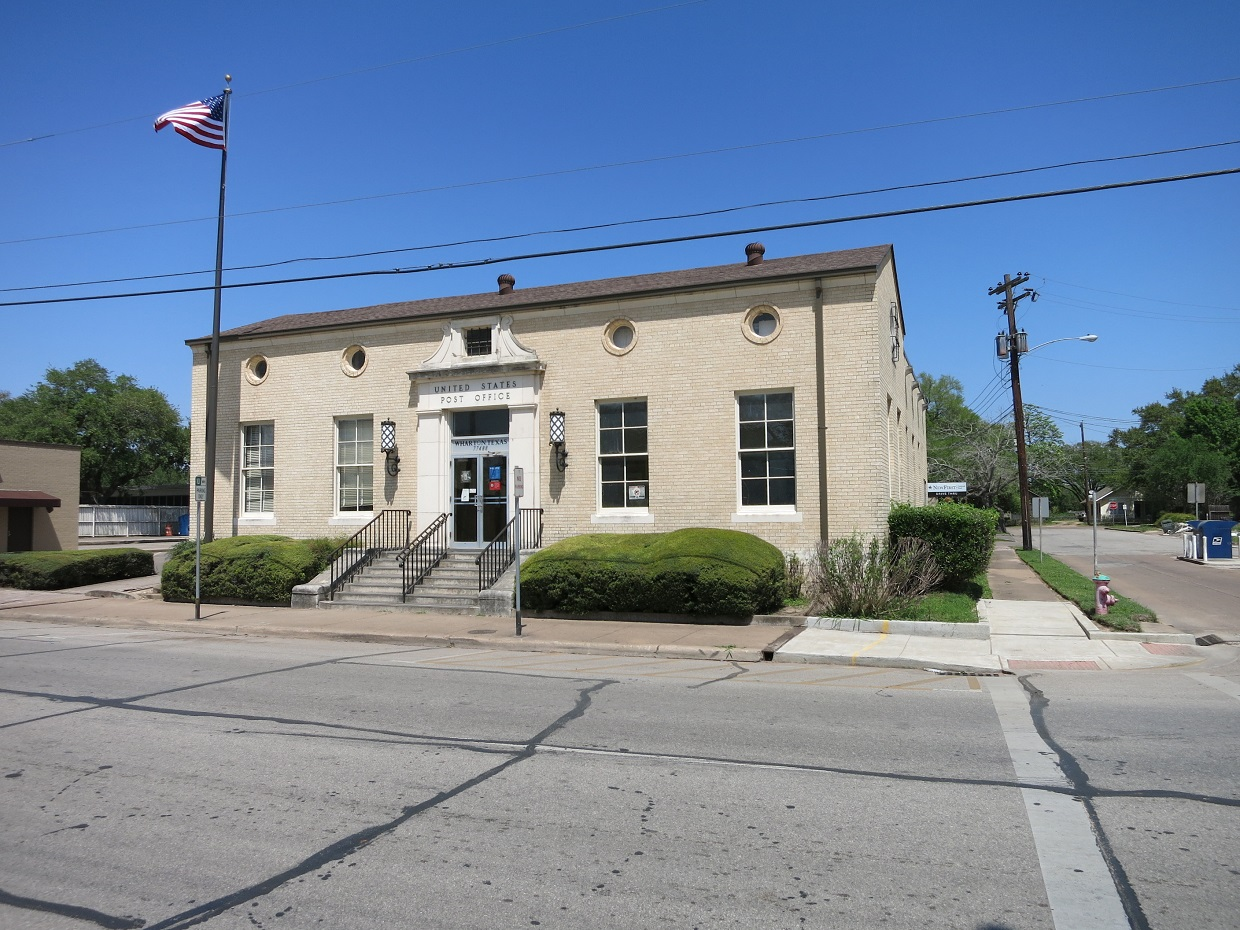
US Post Office

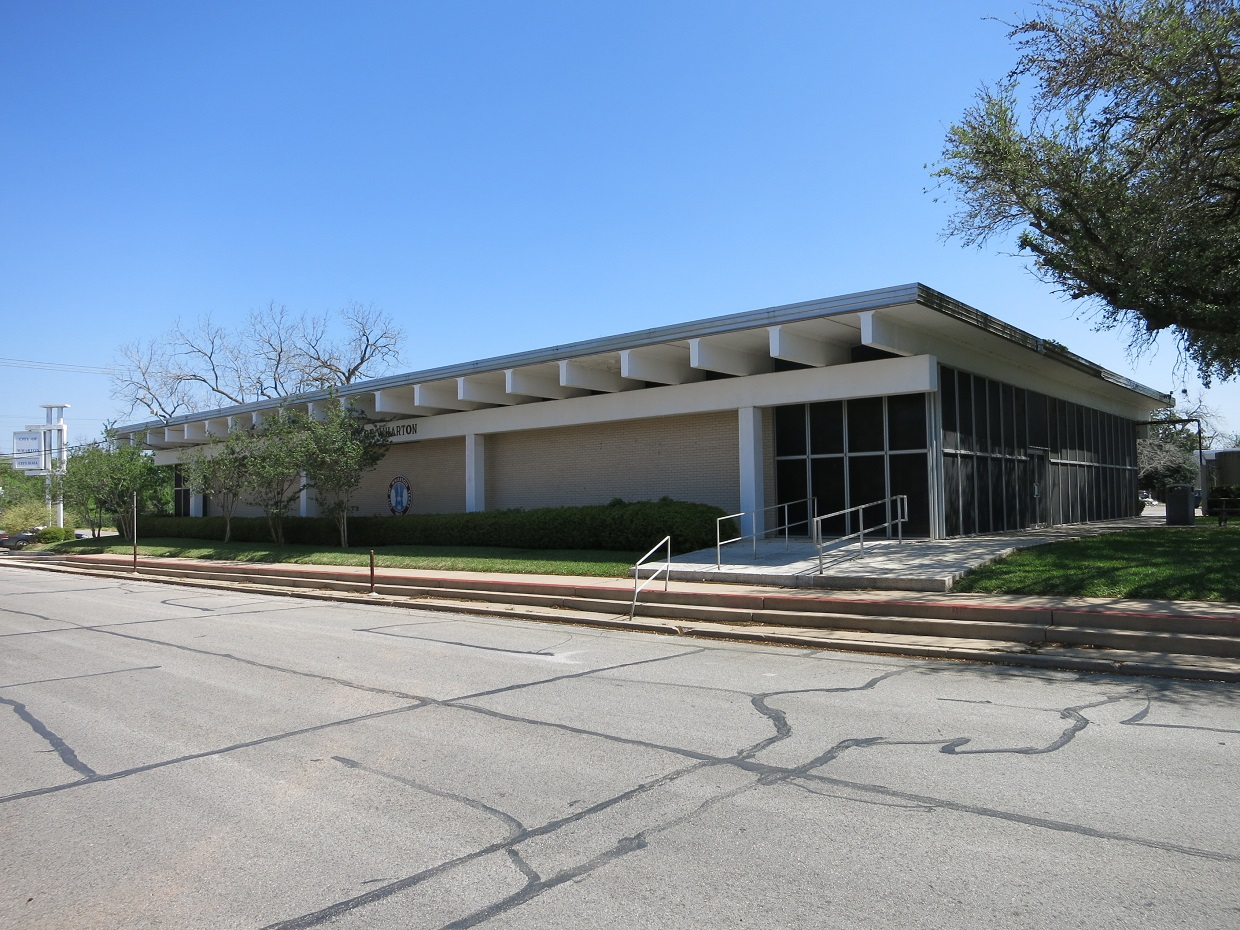
City hall

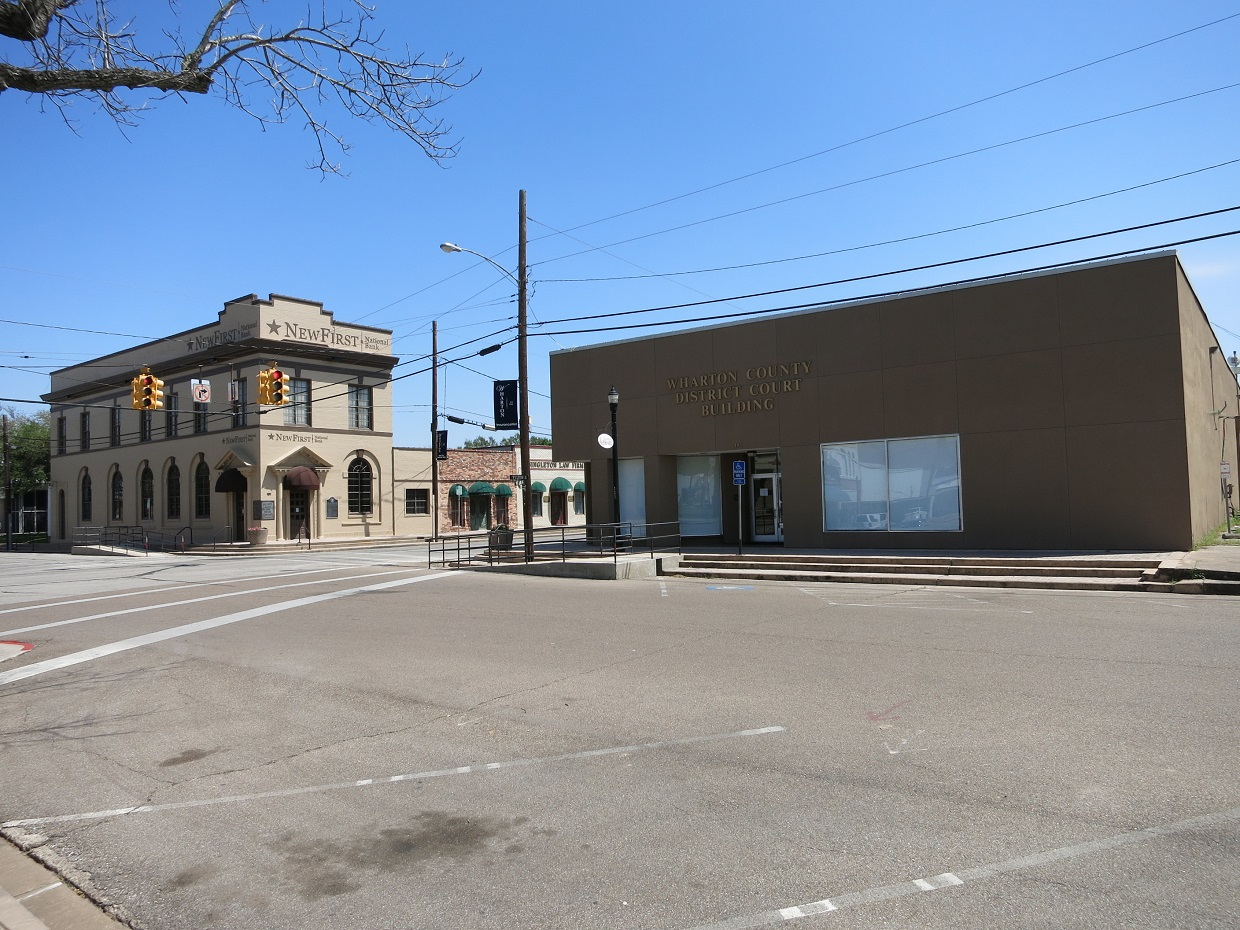
District Court Building

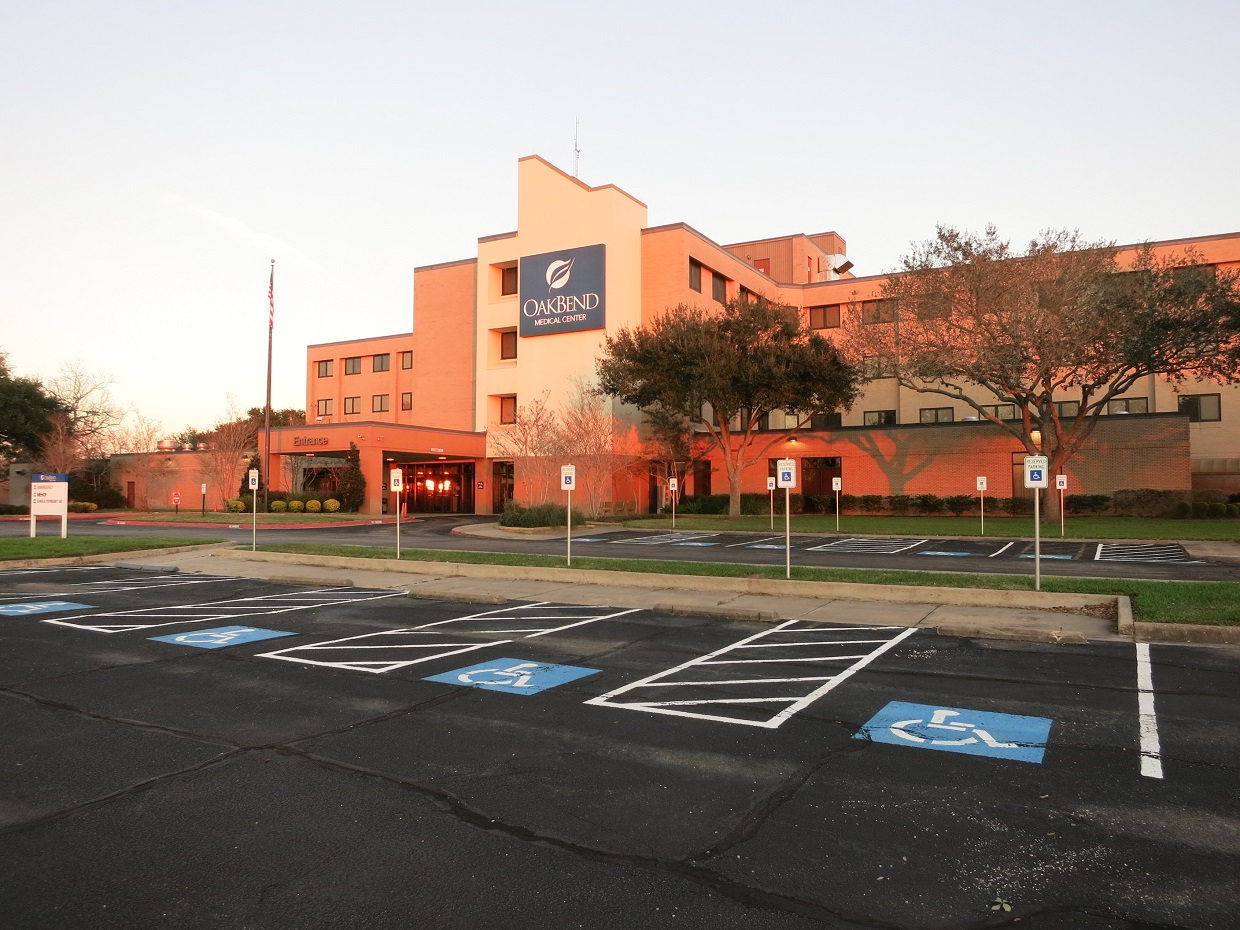
Oak Bend Medical Center

== Notable people ==
- Bert Adams (1891–1940) was an MLB catcher for 1915 NL Champions Philadelphia Phillies.
- Nikki Araguz (1975–2019) was a same-sex marriage activist, author, and public speaker.
- B. J. Baylor (b. 1998) is a professional NFL football player for the Atlanta Falcons.
- Jesse McI. Carter (1863–1930), was a United States Army major general in World War I.
- Larry Dale (1923–2010) was a blues singer, guitarist, and session musician.
- Thyra J. Edwards (1897–1953) was an educator, social worker, journalist, labor and civil-rights activist, and women-rights activist.
- Horton Foote (1916–2009) was a playwright and screenwriter.
- Van G. Garrett, poet
- Go Man Go, (1953–1983) three-time World Champion Quarter Running Horse, American Quarter Horse Hall of Fame
- Albert Clinton Horton (1798–1865) was a Texan politician and first Lieutenant Governor of Texas
- Jim Kearney (b. 1943) is a former NFL safety who played for Kansas City Chiefs
- Lamar Lathon (b. 1967) is a former NFL player for Carolina Panthers.
- Leroy Mitchell (b. 1944) is a former NFL cornerback for the Boston Patriots.
- Robert Parker (1960–2021) was an NCAA track and field coach for Texas A&M University
- Dan Rather (b. 1931) is a journalist, commentator, and former national evening news anchor for CBS.
- Memo Rodriguez (b. 1995) is a professional MLS midfielder for Houston Dynamo.
- Heath Sherman (b. 1967) is a former NFL running back for the Philadelphia Eagles.
- David McCann "Mac" Sweeney (b. 1955) is a Republican former member of the U.S. House of Representatives from Texas (1985–1989).
- Billy Waddy (1954–2022) was an NFL wide receiver for the Los Angeles Rams.
- Horton Foote (1916-2009) was a playwright and Academy Award-winning screenwriter for the movies To Kill a Mockingbird and Tender Mercies.

== See also ==
- National Register of Historic Places listings in Wharton County, Texas
