= List of bulldog mascots =

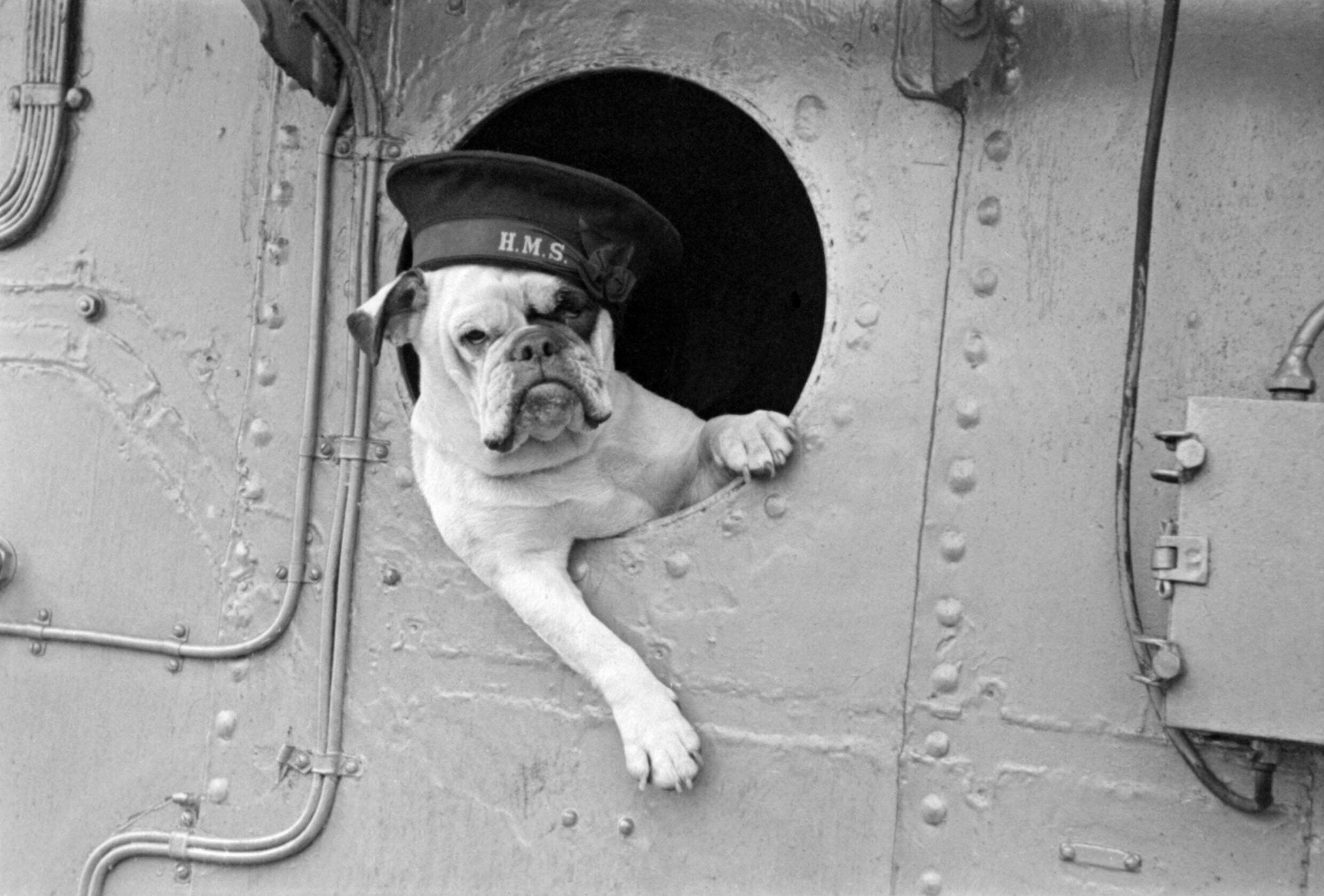
Venus, the ship's mascot, aboard HMS Vansittart, 1941

This is a list of organizations that use the bulldog as a mascot.

Because of its tenacity, the bulldog is a symbol of the United Kingdom and is a popular mascot for professional sports teams, universities, secondary schools, military institutions, and other organizations, including the following:

== Sports teams ==
This section includes professional and semi-professional teams, as well as amateur teams not affiliated with an educational institution. School teams are listed in the sections for Universities and Secondary schools below.

- Australia
  - Canterbury-Bankstown Bulldogs (NRL)
  - Capalaba Bulldogs (BPL)
  - Central District Football Club (SANFL)
  - South Fremantle Football Club (WAFL)
  - Western Bulldogs (AFL)
- Canada
  - Alberni Valley Bulldogs, British Columbia Hockey League
  - Blackfalds Bulldogs, British Columbia Hockey League
  - Antigonish Bulldogs, Maritime Junior A Hockey League
  - Halton Hills Bulldogs, OLA Junior B Lacrosse League
  - Hamilton Bulldogs, American Hockey League 1996–2015
  - Hamilton Bulldogs, Ontario Hockey League
  - Kincardine Bulldogs, Western Junior C Hockey League
  - Quebec Bulldogs, one-time professional ice hockey team
  - Tri-City Bulldogs, Canadian Junior Football League 1994–2004
- United Kingdom
  - Barnsley F.C., Football League Championship (mascot name: Toby Tyke)
  - Batley Bulldogs, Rugby League Championships
  - Birmingham City F.C., Football League Championship (mascot name: Beau Brummie)
  - Great Britain men's national Australian rules football team
- United States
  - Boston Bulldogs, American Football League 1926
  - Boston Bulldogs, National Football League 1929
  - Boston Bulldogs, A-League and USL Pro Soccer League 1999–2001
  - Canton Bulldogs, Ohio League and National Football League 1905–1926
  - Cleveland Bulldogs, National Football League 1924–1927
  - Dayton Bulldogs, National Indoor Football League
  - Denver Bulldogs, United States Australian Football League
  - Flint Bulldogs, Colonial Hockey League 1991–93
  - Los Angeles Bulldogs, 2nd American Football League and Pacific Coast Professional Football League 1936–1948
  - New York Bulldogs, National Football League 1949–1950
- Other countries
  - Odense Bulldogs, Oddset Ligaen (ice hockey) (Denmark)
  - CS Dinamo București, SuperLiga (rugby union) (Romania)
  - Border Bulldogs (rugby union) (South Africa)

== Universities ==
=== United States ===
- Adrian College (mascot name: Bruiser)
- Alabama A&M University
- Allan Hancock College (mascot name: Spike)
- Ave Maria University
- Bellevue College
- Barton College (mascot name: Bully)
- Bowie State University (mascot name: Butch)
- Brooklyn College (mascot name: Buster)
- Bryant University (mascot name: Tupper II)
- Butler University (mascot name: Butler Blue IV; costumed mascot: Hink)
- California State University, Fresno (Fresno State) (mascot: Timeout; live mascot: Victor E. Bulldog)
- The Citadel (mascot names: General and Boo V)
- College of San Mateo
- Concordia University, Nebraska
- Dean College (Mascot name: Boomer)
- DeSales University
- Drake University (mascot name: Spike, live mascot: Griff)
- Ferris State University (mascot name: Brutus)
- Fisk University
- Fresno State
- Gardner–Webb University (team name: the Runnin' Bulldogs, mascot name: Mac the Bulldog)
- Georgetown University (team name: the Hoyas, mascot name: Jack the Bulldog)
- University of Georgia (mascot name: Uga, costumed mascot: Hairy Dawg)
- Gonzaga University (mascot name: Spike Q. Gonzaga)
- James Madison University (mascot name: Duke Dog)
- Kettering University (mascot name: General Determination)
- Louisiana Tech University (mascot names: Tech XXII and Champ)
- McPherson College (mascot name: Ben the Bulldog)
- University of Minnesota Duluth (mascot name: Champ)
- University of Montana Western (mascot name: Charge)
- Mississippi State University (mascot name: Bully the Bulldog)
- North Carolina A&T State University (team name: the Aggies)
- Union University (mascot name: Buster)
- University of North Carolina at Asheville (mascot name: Rocky)
- University of Puerto Rico at Mayagüez (mascot name: Tarzán)
- University of Redlands (mascot name: Addie/Adelaide)
- Samford University (mascot name: Sam)
- South Carolina State University
- South Suburban College
- Southwestern Oklahoma State University (mascot names: Duke and Brandi)
- Texas Lutheran University (mascot name: Lucky)
- Truman State University (mascot names: Spike and Simone)
- Western Illinois University (team name: the Leathernecks, mascot name: Colonel Rock)
- Wilberforce University
- Wingate University (mascot name: Victor E. Bulldog)
- Yale University (mascot name: Handsome Dan)

=== Other countries ===
- Bath Spa University, Bath, Somerset (England)
- Churchill College, Cambridge (England)
- National University (the Philippines)

== Secondary schools ==
(in the United States, unless otherwise noted)

- Albuquerque High School (Albuquerque, New Mexico)
- Alden High School (Alden, New York)
- Alfred E. Beach High School (Savannah, Georgia)
- Alvord High School (Alvord, Texas)
- Amherst High School (Amherst, Texas)
- Andalusia High School (Andalusia, Alabama)
- Anderson County High School (Garnett, Kansas)
- Anton High School (Anton, Texas)
- Appalachia High School (Appalachia, Virginia)
- Athens High School (Ohio) (The Plains, Ohio)
- Auburn High School (Auburn, Nebraska)
- Austin High School (Sugar Land, Texas)
- Avery High School (Avery, Texas)
- Bald Knob High School (Bald Knob, Arkansas)
- Bancroft School (Worcester, Massachusetts)
- Bandera High School (Bandera, Texas)
- Barbara Bush Middle School (San Antonio, Texas)
- Barry Goldwater High School (Phoenix, Arizona)
- Baton Rouge Magnet High School (Baton Rouge, Louisiana)
- Batavia High School (Batavia, Illinois)
- Benjamin Bosse High School (Evansville, Indiana)
- Bearden High School (Knoxville, Tennessee)
- Beaver Lake Middle School (Issaquah, Washington)
- Bedford High School (Bedford, New Hampshire)
- Bellerose Composite High School (Saint Albert, Alberta) (Canada)
- Belmont Secondary School (Victoria, Brirish Columbia) (Canada)
- Berea High School (Greenville, South Carolina)
- Berwick Academy (South Berwick, Maine)
- Berwick Area Senior High School (Berwick, Pennsylvania)
- Bettendorf High School (Bettendorf, Iowa)
- Big Spring High School (Newville, Pennsylvania)
- Boiling Springs High School (Boiling Springs, South Carolina)
- Boling High School (Boling, Texas)
- Booker T. Washington High School (Atlanta, Georgia)
- Borger High School (Borger, Texas)
- Bosqueville High School (Waco, Texas)
- Bowie High School (Bowie, Maryland)
- Bowie High School (Austin, Texas)
- Brandywine High School (Wilmington, Delaware)
- Bridgeport High School (Bridgeport, Ohio)
- Bridgeton High School (Bridgeton, New Jersey)
- Brighton High School (Brighton, Michigan)
- Brownsburg High School (Brownsburg, Indiana)
- Brunswick High School (Lawrenceville, Virginia)
- Buena High School (Ventura, California)
- Bullis School (Potomac, Maryland)
- Burbank High School (Burbank, California)
- Burkburnett High School (Burkburnett, Texas)
- Burnet High School (Burnet, Texas)
- Butler High School (Augusta, Georgia)
- Bynum High School (Bynum, Texas)
- C. D. Hylton High School (Woodbridge, Virginia)
- Cache High School (Cache, Oklahoma)
- Camden High School (Camden, South Carolina)
- Canton McKinley High School (Canton, Ohio)
- Carthage High School (Carthage, Texas)
- Cashmere High School (Cashmere, Washington)
- Cecilia High School (Saint Martin Parish, Louisiana)
- Cedartown High School (Cedartown, Georgia)
- Celina High School (Celina, Ohio)
- Centennial High School (Las Vegas, Nevada)
- Centerville Senior High School (Centerville, Indiana)
- Central High School (Springfield, Missouri)
- Chamblee High School (Chamblee, Georgia)
- Chelsea High School, Chelsea, Michigan
- Churchill School (Harare, Zimbabwe)
- Clarke County High School (Grove Hill, Alabama)
- Clyde High School (Clyde, Texas)
- Columbus Grove High School (Columbus Grove, Ohio)
- Columbus North High School (Columbus, Indiana)
- Cooper High School (Cooper, Texas)
- Copperas Cove High School (Copperas Cove, Texas)
- Creswell High School (Creswell, Oregon) (mascot name: Jake)
- Crestview High School (Crestview, Florida)
- Crosby High School (Waterbury, Connecticut)
- Crown Point High School (Crown Point, Indiana)
- David W. Butler High School (Charlotte, North Carolina)
- Dawson High School (Dawson, Texas)
- Decatur High School (Decatur, Georgia)
- Defiance High School (Defiance, Ohio)
- Douglass High School (Douglass, Kansas)
- Douglas High School (Douglas, Arizona)
- Dutchtown High School (Hampton, Georgia)
- Dwight-Englewood School (Englewood, New Jersey)
- Easton Area High School (Easton, Pennsylvania) (team name: the Red Rovers)
- East Knox High School (Howard, Ohio)
- East Palestine High School (East Palestine, Ohio)
- Eden High School (Eden, Texas)
- Edmond Memorial High School (Edmond, Oklahoma)
- Elida High School (Elida, Ohio)
- Ellensburg High School (Ellensburg, Washington)
- Eustace High School (Eustace, Texas)
- Everman Joe C. Bean High School (Everman, Texas)
- Fairfax High School (Fairfax, Missouri)
- Fayetteville High School (Fayetteville, Arkansas)
- Flagler Palm Coast High School (Bunnell, Florida)
- Folsom High School (Folsom, California)
- Fontainebleau High School (Mandeville, Louisiana)
- Forsyth Central High School (Cumming, Georgia)
- Fort Zumwalt South High School (Saint Peters, Missouri)
- Frank Scott Bunnell High School (Stratford, Connecticut)
- Freedom High School (Freedom, Pennsylvania)
- Fulton High School (Fulton, Kentucky)
- G. Holmes Braddock High School (Miami, Florida)
- Galena High School (Galena, Kansas)
- George Wythe High School (Richmond, Virginia)
- Garfield High School (East Los Angeles, California)
- Garfield High School (Seattle, Washington)
- Garfield Heights High School (Garfield Heights, Ohio)
- Garrison High School (Garrison, Texas)
- George W. Hewlett High School (Hewlett, New York)
- Grandville High School (Grandville, Michigan)
- Green High School (Green, Ohio)
- Greenwood High School (Greenwood, Arkansas)
- Haddonfield Memorial High School (Haddonfield, New Jersey)
- Hamburg High School (Hamburg, New York)
- Hamilton High School (Hamilton, Texas)
- Hampton High School (Hampton, Tennessee)
- Hancock Central High School (Hancock, Michigan)
- Hardin High School, Hardin, Montana
- Harlem High School (Harlem, Georgia)
- Hazard High School (Hazard, Kentucky)
- Heights High School (Houston Heights, Texas)
- Hemet High School (Hemet, California)
- Hermiston High School (Hermiston, Oregon)
- Holly Grove Middle School (Holly Springs, North Carolina)
- Hopewell Valley Central High School (Pennington, New Jersey)
- Iola High School (Iola, Texas)
- Ira High School (Ira, Texas)
- Irvington High School (Irvington, New York)
- Island Trees High School (Levittown, New York)
- Jay M. Robinson High School (Concord, North Carolina)
- Jefferson High School (Jefferson, Texas)
- John B. Alexander High School (Laredo, Texas)
- Judge Memorial Catholic High School (Salt Lake City, Utah)
- Kenmore East High School, (Tonawanda, New York)
- Kilgore High School (Kilgore, Texas)
- Kingman High School (Kingman, Arizona)
- La Porte High School (La Porte, Texas)
- Lanier County High School (Lakeland, Georgia)
- Las Cruces High School (Las Cruces, New Mexico)
- Lawrence County High School (Louisa, Kentucky)
- Le Jardin Academy (Honolulu, Hawaii)
- Lindenhurst Senior High School (Lindenhurst, New York)
- Lithonia High School (Lithonia, Georgia)
- Long Island City High School (Queens, New York, New York)
- Louisville Male High School (Louisville, Kentucky)
- Luella High School (Locust Grove, Georgia)
- Luray High School (Luray, Virginia)
- Lyman Memorial High School (Lebanon, Connecticut)
- Lynn English High School (Lynn, Massachusetts)
- Macon County High School (Montezuma, Georgia)
- Madison High School (Madison, Kansas)
- Magnolia High School (Magnolia, Texas)
- Mahomet-Seymour High School (Mahomet, Illinois)
- Malcolm X Shabazz High School (Newark, New Jersey)
- Marion High School (Marion, Texas)
- Marlin High School (Marlin, Texas)
- Martinsburg High School (Martinsburg, West Virginia)
- Martinsville High School (Martinsville, Virginia)
- Mary Persons High School (Forsyth, Georgia)
- McAllen High School (McAllen, Texas)
- McCluer South-Berkeley High School (St. Louis, Missouri)
- McGregor High School (McGregor, Texas)
- McLoughlin Middle School (Medford, Oregon)
- Meadville Area Senior High School (Meadville, Pennsylvania)
- Melbourne High School (Melbourne, Florida)
- Memorial Middle School (Tampa, Florida)
- Milbank High School (Milbank, South Dakota)
- Milford High School (Milford, Texas)
- Millsap High School (Millsap, Texas)
- Montachusett Regional Vocational Technical School (Fitchburg, Massachusetts)
- Mount Vernon High School (Mount Vernon, Washington)
- Mount Zion High School (Jonesboro, Georgia)
- Natchez High School (Natchez, Mississippi)
- Nederland High School (Nederland, Texas)
- New Albany High School (New Albany, Indiana)
- New Haven High School (New Haven, Indiana)
- New London High School (New London, Wisconsin)
- Newberry High School (Newberry, South Carolina)
- Noble and Greenough School (Dedham, Massachusetts)
- Norfolk Academy (Norfolk, Virginia)
- North Bend High School (North Bend, Oregon)
- North Caroline High School (Denton, Maryland)
- North Gwinnett High School (Suwanee, Georgia)
- North Platte High School (North Platte, Nebraska)
- North Shore Technical High School (Middleton, Massachusetts)
- Northern Lehigh High School (Slatington, Pennsylvania)
- Notre Dame High School (Cape Girardeau, Missouri)
- Oak Hills High School (Oak Hills, California)
- Old Rochester Regional High School (Mattapoisett, Massachusetts)
- Olmsted Falls High School (Olmsted Falls, Ohio)
- Omaha Burke High School (Omaha, Nebraska)
- Otsego High School (Otsego, Michigan)
- Ottoson Middle School (Arlington, Massachusetts)
- Ottumwa High School (Ottumwa, Iowa)
- Palisade High School (Palisade, Colorado)
- Pasadena High School (Pasadena, California)
- Pasco High School (Pasco, Washington)
- Passaic County Technical Institute (Wayne, New Jersey)
- Paul Laurence Dunbar High School (Lexington, Kentucky)
- Plainview High School (Plainview, Texas)
- Portland High School (Portland, Maine)
- Queen City High School (Queen City, Texas)
- Queen Creek High School (Queen Creek, Arizona)
- Quitman High School (Quitman, Texas)
- Ranger High School (Ranger, Texas)
- Raoul Wallenberg Traditional High School (San Francisco, California)
- Ravenna High School (Ravenna, Michigan)
- Red River Senior High School (Coushatta, Louisiana)
- Rice High School (Rice, Texas)
- Ririe High School (Ririe, Idaho)
- Riverside Brookfield High School (Riverside, Illinois)
- Rockdale County High School (Conyers, Georgia)
- Rockland Senior High School (Rockland, Massachusetts)
- Roger Ludlowe Middle School (Fairfield, Connecticut)
- Rolla High School (Rolla, Missouri)
- Roslyn High School (Roslyn Heights, New York)
- Rossford High School (Rossford, Ohio)
- Rossville High School (Rossville, Kansas)
- Royse City High School (Royse City, Texas)
- Ruben S. Ayala High School (Chino Hills, California)
- Rumson-Fair Haven Regional High School (Rumson, New Jersey)
- Rutherford High School (Rutherford, New Jersey)
- Safford High School (Safford, Arizona)
- San Jose High School (San Jose, California)
- San Rafael High School (San Rafael, California)
- Senator O'Connor College School (North York, Ontario, Canada)
- St. Albans School (Washington, D.C.)
- St. Clair High School (Saint Clair, Missouri)
- Saint Cloud High School (Saint Cloud, Florida)
- Saint James High School for Boys (Chester, Pennsylvania – closed in 1993)
- School of the Future (New York City) (New York, New York)
- Shady Side Academy (Pittsburgh, Pennsylvania)
- Sheffield High School (Sheffield, Alabama)
- Sikeston High School (Sikeston, Missouri)
- Sir Winston Churchill High School (Calgary, Alberta, Canada)
- Sir Winston Churchill Secondary School (Hamilton, Ontario, Canada)
- Socorro High School (Socorro, Texas)
- Somerset High School (Somerset, Texas)
- South Fork High School (Stuart, Florida)
- South Glens Falls Senior High School (South Glens Falls, New York)
- South Harrison High School (Bethany, Missouri)
- Southeast Raleigh Magnet High School (Raleigh, North Carolina)
- Southern High School (Anne Arundel County, Maryland)
- Spur High School (Spur, Texas)
- Stamford High School (Stamford, Texas)
- Stone Bridge High School (Ashburn, Virginia)
- Stow-Munroe Falls High School (Stow, Ohio)
- Sulphur High School (Sulphur, Oklahoma)
- Summerfield High School (Petersburg, Michigan)
- Sutherlin High School (Sutherlin, Oregon)
- Suwannee High School (Live Oak, Florida)
- Sweeny High School (Sweeny, Texas)
- Taft Middle School (Crown Point, Indiana)
- Tazewell High School (Tazewell, Virginia)
- Terry High School (Terry, Mississippi)
- Thomasville High School (Thomasville, Georgia)
- Thomson High School (Thomson, Georgia)
- Three Rivers High School (Three Rivers, Texas)
- Thorndale High School (Thorndale, Texas)
- Toombs County High School (Lyons, Georgia)
- Tracy High School (Tracy, California)
- Trenton High School (Trenton, Missouri)
- Tri-Cities High School (East Point, Georgia)
- Trimble Tech High School (Fort Worth, Texas)
- Trion High School (Trion, Georgia)
- Turlock High School (Turlock, California)
- Tygarts Valley High School (Mill Creek, West Virginia)
- Vacaville High School (Vacaville, California)
- Valley Forge Military Academy and College (Wayne, Pennsylvania)
- Vancleave High School (Vancleave, Mississippi)
- Van Meter High School, Van Meter, Iowa
- Waialua High and Intermediate School (Waialua, Hawaii)
- Waller High School (Waller, Texas)
- Walter M. Williams High School (Burlington, North Carolina)
- Waterloo High School (Waterloo, Illinois)
- Waukegan High School (Waukegan, Illinois)
- West Albany High School (Albany, Oregon)
- West Allis Central High School (West Allis, Wisconsin)
- West Covina High School (West Covina, California)
- Westerly High School (Westerly, Rhode Island)
- Westfield High School (Chantilly, Virginia)
- Wilson High School (Spring Township, Berks County, Pennsylvania)
- Winder-Barrow High School (Winder, Georgia)
- Winslow High School (Winslow, Arizona)
- Winston Churchill High School (Potomac, Maryland)
- Woodburn High School (Woodburn, Oregon)
- Wylie High School (Abilene, Texas) (mascot name: Spike)
- Yale High School (Yale, Michigan)

== Other uses ==
=== Military ===
- HMS Bulldog
- United States Air Force Academy, Cadet Squadron 13, "the Bulldawgs"
- United States Air Force, 354th Fighter Squadron
- United States Air Force Basic Military Training, 326th Training Squadron
- United States Army, 3rd Infantry Division
- United States Marine Corps
- VMA-223

=== Commercial organizations ===
- Bulldog Films, a brand name and mascot used by film pioneer Will Barker
- Churchill Insurance
- Mack Trucks
- Omega Psi Phi fraternity
- Victory Records

=== Food and beverage ===
- Mug Root Beer

=== Musical artists ===
- The Mighty Mighty Bosstones

=== Public service ===
- New York City Fire Department, Rescue 2 (Brooklyn)

=== Wrestling ===
- British Bulldogs, a WWF wrestling team accompanied to the ring by Matilda and later Winston, a Bulldog

=== Miscellaneous ===
- Mongrel Mob, a New Zealand gang

== Fictional ==
- Syracuse Bulldogs, an ice-hockey team in the 1977 film Slap Shot
