= Virgil Eikenberg =

American football player (1924–1987)

No. 49
- Position: Quarterback

Personal information
- Born: February 22, 1924; Old Gulf, Texas, U.S.
- Died: January 30, 1987 (aged 62); Houston, Texas, U.S.
- Listed height: 6 ft 2 in (1.88 m)
- Listed weight: 205 lb (93 kg)

Career information
- High school: Boling (Boling-Iago, Texas)
- College: Louisiana; Rice
- NFL draft: 1945: 18th round, 176th overall pick

Career history
- Chicago Cardinals (1948)

Awards and highlights
- Second-team All-SWC (1946)

Career NFL statistics
- Passing yards: 116
- TD–INT: 3-2
- Passer rating: 53.8
- Stats at Pro Football Reference

Charles Virgil "Ike" Eikenberg (February 22, 1924 – January 30, 1987) was an American professional football player who was a quarterback for the Chicago Cardinals of the National Football League (NFL). He played college football for the Rice Owls.

Eikenberg attended Boling High School in Texas. He played college football at Rice University. He was selected as co-captain of the West team for the 1948 East–West Shrine Game.

In June 1948, Eikenberg signed a contract to play for the Chicago Cardinals. He appeared in nine games for the Cardinals during the 1948 season.

Starting in 1950, Eikenberg worked as a baseball and football coach and, starting in 1956, as assistant principal of Brazosport High School. He died in 1987 in Houston.
