= Iago, Texas =

- CDP
- Interactive map of Iago, Texas
- Coordinates: 29°15′59″N 95°57′47″W
- Country: United States
- State: Texas
- County: Wharton

Area
  - Total: 1.9 sq mi (4.9 km^{2})
  - Land: 1.9 sq mi (4.9 km^{2})
  - Water: 0.0 sq mi (0 km^{2})

Population (2020)
  - Total: 148
  - Density: 78/sq mi (30/km^{2})
- Time zone: UTC-6 (Central (CST))
  - Summer (DST): UTC-5 (CDT)
- Zip Code: 77420

Iago (Pron: Eye-a'-go) is a census-designated place (CDP) in Wharton County, Texas, United States. This was a new CDP formed from parts of the Boling-Iago CDP prior to the 2010 census. As of the 2020 census, Iago had a population of 148.

== Geography ==
Iago is located at 29°15′59″N 95°57′47″W (29.266512, -95.963005). The CDP has a total area of 1.9 square miles (4.9 km^{2}), all land.

== Demographics ==
Historical population
Census	Pop.	Note	%±
2010	161		—
2020	148		−8.1%
U.S. Decennial Census; 1850–1900 1910; 1920 1930 1940; 1950 1960 1970; 1980 1990 2000; 2010 2020

Iago first appeared as a census designated place in the 2010 U.S. census.

=== 2020 census ===
Iago CDP, Texas – Racial and ethnic composition Note: the US Census treats Hispanic/Latino as an ethnic category. This table excludes Latinos from the racial categories and assigns them to a separate category. Hispanics/Latinos may be of any race.
Race / Ethnicity (NH = Non-Hispanic)	Pop 2010	Pop 2020	% 2010	% 2020
White alone (NH)	82	66	50.93%	44.59%
Black or African American alone (NH)	16	18	9.94%	12.16%
Native American or Alaska Native alone (NH)	0	3	0.00%	2.03%
Asian alone (NH)	0	1	0.00%	0.68%
Native Hawaiian or Pacific Islander alone (NH)	0	0	0.00%	0.00%
Other race alone (NH)	0	0	0.00%	0.00%
Mixed race or Multiracial (NH)	0	1	0.00%	0.68%
Hispanic or Latino (any race)	63	59	39.13%	39.86%
Total	161	148	100.00%	100.00%

== Education ==
It is in the Boling Independent School District. The comprehensive high school of the district is Boling High School.

The Texas Legislature assigns all of Wharton County to Wharton County Junior College.
