= Trista Seara =

American soccer player (born 1998)

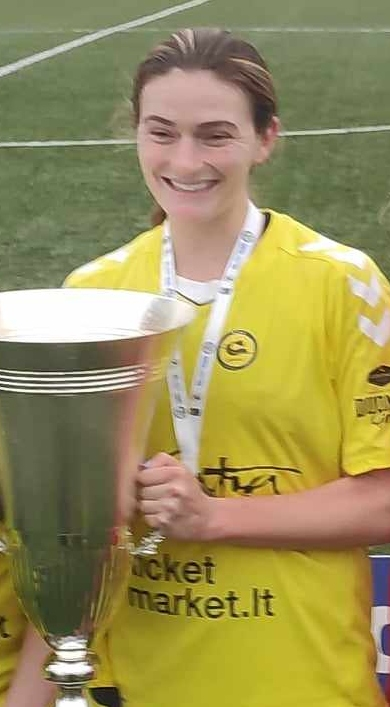

Personal information
- Full name: Trista Celine Seara
- Date of birth: April 21, 1998 (age 28)
- Place of birth: Lindenhurst, New York, United States
- Height: 5 ft 8 in (1.73 m)
- Positions: Right back; winger

Youth career
- 2015: Lindenhurst HS
- 2016: Farmingdale Legacy

College career
Years	Team	Apps	(Gls)
2016–2019	Mercy Mavericks	76	(8)

Senior career*
Years	Team	Apps	(Gls)
2017	Sky Blue FC Reserve	8	(2)
2020–2021	Málaga CF		
2021–2023	AEL FC		
2023–2024	Kdz. Ereğli Belediye Spor	14	(3)
2024	FC Gintra	10	(10)
- * Club domestic league appearances and goals as of 8 April 2025

Trista Celine Seara (born April 21, 1998) is an American professional soccer player, who plays as a right back or winger for Kdz. Ereğli Belediye Spor in the Turkish Women's Football Super League.

== Early years ==
Seara started her soccer career playing with The Lindenhurst Ladyflyers Club Team, followed by her high school team at Lindenhurst Senior High School. In 2016, she was also part of the team Farmingdale Legacy.

During her university years between 2016 and 2020, she played in the college soccer team Mercy Maverics in the NCAA Division II. The captain of the team was three-time All-ECC selection and two-time All-Region honouree. She recorded eight goals in a total of 76 games played.

== Club career ==
Weighing 140 lb (64 kg), the 5 ft 8 in (1.73 m) tall athlete plays in the right back or winger positions.

In the summer of 2017, she turned professional and played for the reserve team of the New Jersey-club Sky Blue FC.

Soon after finishing at college, she went to Spain in October 2020, and joined Málaga CF playing one year in the Segunda Federación.

She transferred in September 2021 to AEL FC in Larissa, Greece to play in the 2021–22 and 2022–23 seasons of the Greek A Division.

In August 2023, she moved to Turkey, and signed with the Turkish Super League-club Kdz. Ereğli Belediye Spor.

== Personal life ==
Trista Celine Seara was born to Tony and Nicole Seara in Lindenhurst, New York, United States on April 21, 1998. She has three brothers, A.J., Devin and Jace.

After completing her secondary education at Lindenhurst Senior High School in her hometown, she studied from 2016 on at Mercy University majoring in Finance and Marketing. She graduated in 2020 with a Bachelor of Science degree.
