= Joe Levelis =

American football player (born 1961)

No. 75
- Position: Offensive tackle

Personal information
- Born: January 6, 1961 (age 65); Columbus, Ohio, U.S.
- Listed height: 6 ft 4 in (1.93 m)
- Listed weight: 280 lb (127 kg)

Career information
- High school: Lindenhurst Senior (NY)
- College: Iowa
- NFL draft: 1984: 6th round, 166th overall pick

Career history
- Oklahoma / Arizona Outlaws (1984–1985)

Awards and highlights
- Second-team All-Big Ten (1983)

Joseph J. Levelis (born January 6, 1961) is an American former football offensive tackle in the United States Football League (USFL) for the Oklahoma and Arizona Outlaws. He played college football at the University of Iowa.

== Early life ==
Levelis attended Lindenhurst Senior High School, where he was a starter at offensive tackle. He accepted a football scholarship from the University of Iowa. He became a starter at left guard as a sophomore. He was moved to right tackle as a junior, to replace the departed Brett Miller.

== Professional career ==
Levelis was selected by the Dallas Cowboys in the eleventh round (304th overall) of the 1984 NFL draft. He opted to instead sign with the United States Football League.

On May 9, 1984, he was signed as a free agent by the Oklahoma Outlaws of the United States Football League. He was a backup offensive tackle and played 2 seasons until the league folded.

== Coaching ==
Levelis was a football graduate assistant at the University of Iowa.
