= Lindenhurst Memorial Library =

- 40.682532°N 73.367716°W
- Location: Lindenhurst, New York
- Type: Public
- Established: 1953

Collection
- Size: 300,000 items

Access and use
- Circulation: 400,000
- Population served: 42,597

Other information
- Budget: $4,000,000
- Director: Lisa Kropp
- Employees: 60
- Website: lindenhurstlibrary.org//

The Lindenhurst Memorial Library (LML) is a public library and veterans memorial located in Lindenhurst, New York, and is one of the fifty-six libraries that are part of the Suffolk Cooperative Library System. Two different buildings have housed the library since July 1, 1953. The library's current building was designed and erected by local architects.

== History ==
=== From 1945 to 1953 ===
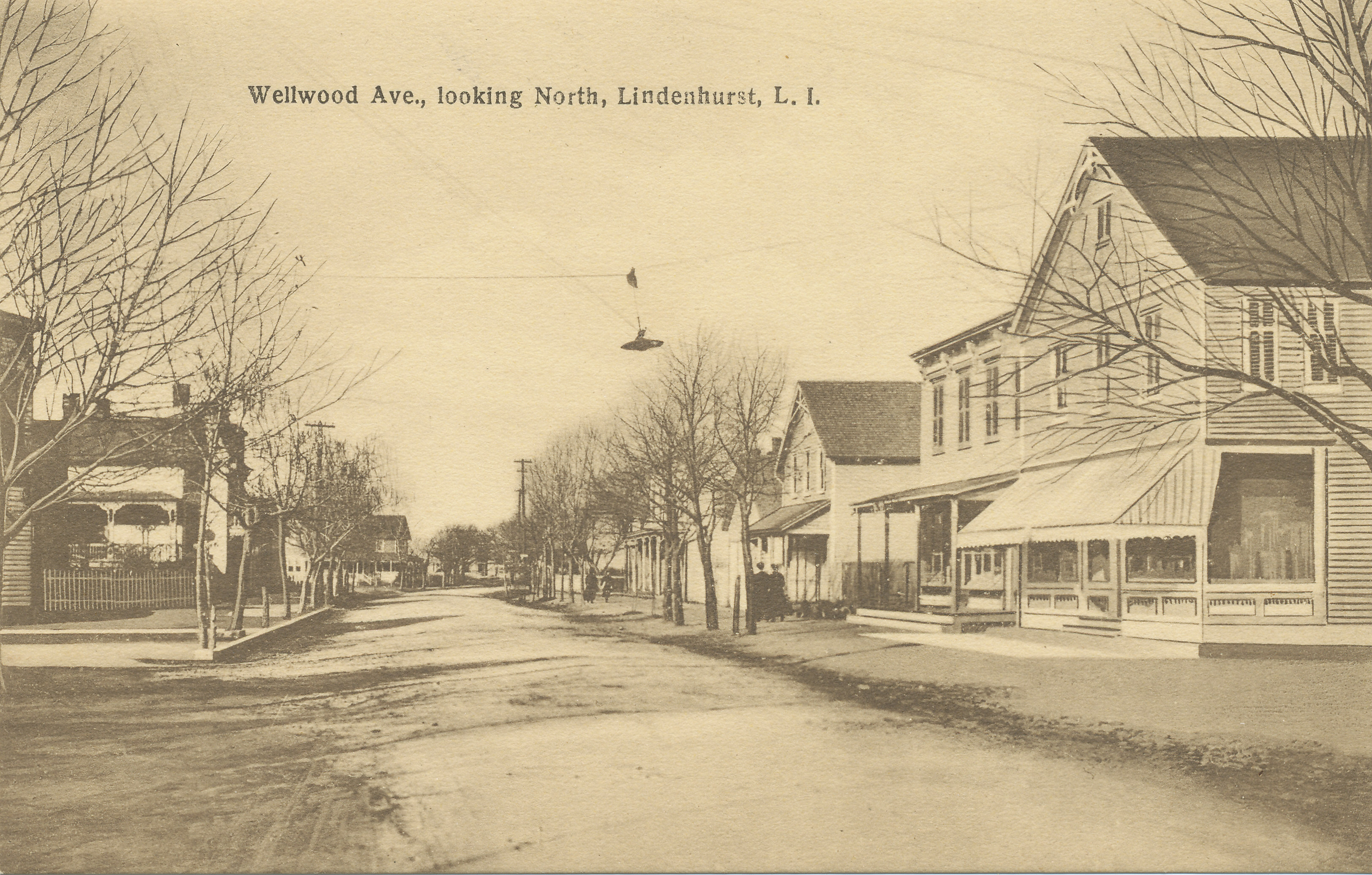
Old Lindenhurst

On May 10, 1945, at a public meeting, which included the representatives of all local organizations, Mayor of the Village, John C. Blankenhorn, suggested that the community and pay tribute to its World War II military veterans by establishing a Memorial Library.

Six hundred and fifty-three men and women from the Lindenhurst School District and its neighboring unincorporated areas at this time had served in the armed forces, eighteen of which had lost their lives. As a result, Mayor Blankenhorn’s proposal for a Memorial Library was unanimously approved.

In August 1945, a Board of Directors had been elected for a Memorial Library Association. It consisted of Adam Muller as President, Dr. George Benstock as Vice-President, Frank Graser as Treasurer, Oscar Murov as Secretary, as well as Joseph A Pinter, Carlos Koetzner, Alfred Hahn, Lorena Frevert, and Mrs. Alfred Pfeiffer.

In 1946, a library site was purchased with funds from a Lindenhurst School District subscription drive, the proceeds of various benefit affairs and cash balances from local wartime efforts. The site was located on the east side of South Wellwood Avenue between Herbert and Irving Avenues. The purchase price was approximately $10,200.

In a public ceremony, preceded by a parade, the site was dedicated on Pearl Harbor Day, December 7, 1947.

Around May 1950, the Village of Lindenhurst was seeking a site for new municipal offices to replace the building now known as the Old Village Hall Museum. As a result, the Village Trustees approached the nine directors of the Lindenhurst Memorial Library Association with an offer. They proposed to erect a library building adjoining the Village Hall on the library’s South Wellwood Avenue if the Library Association agreed to deed the property to the Village for $1.00. The offer was accepted by the Library Association and on October 19, 1951, taxpayers approved a $142,000 proposition to erect Village Hall and Library on the South Wellwood Avenue site.

On January 17, 1952 a meeting was held at which the Lindenhurst Memorial Library Association voted to transfer ownership of the property to the village. Two months later, on March 28, 1952 the Lindenhurst Memorial Library Association was officially dissolved by a vote of Board of Directors. By March 31, a resolution of the Village Board was passed and the Village Library was created to be known as the Lindenhurst Memorial Library.

The Ground breaking took place on August 3, 1952 and the Lindenhurst Memorial Library at 440 South Wellwood Avenue began its service to the community on July 1, 1953. The new facility was jointly supported by the Incorporated Village and School District No. 4. The Village supplied the building, utilities and maintenance while the School District provided the operating monies for staff, books and materials.

=== From 1953 to Present ===
In the early 1950s, Lindenhurst was still in the midst of the escalating post war population growth. Baby boomers were adding 1,000 children annually to the school enrollments and consequently, to the library’s membership. At the time, the Library section of Village Hall only had seating space for twenty-two adults and twelve children. Cramped conditions left little room for visitors to move around. Additionally, with limited book shelves filled to capacity, some 5,000 volumes had to be stored in the attic, in the rear building and in two trailers located outside the structure. Access to the trailers was difficult, very time consuming and even hazardous at times. Movie screenings and story hours for children were conducted in the upstairs courtroom during limited periods when the space was available.

As a result of the population growth and constant development of new homes and businesses, the Incorporated Village also needed larger quarters for its administrative offices and operating departments. In 1964, voters approved a proposition to convert the library from a Village Library to a School District Library. The Lindenhurst Memorial Library Village Charter was cancelled on October 7, 1964.

Voters approved the expenditure of $757,500.00 on May 3, 1967 to construct a new library building at One Lee Avenue.

The Lindenhurst Memorial Library at One Lee Avenue is dedicated to the men and women who served their country in the time of war, on May 18, 1969. New York State granted the Library is Absolute Charter as a School District Public Library, on June 26, 1970.

In 1988, due to the steady growth of the library and the increase in demand for more services, the Board of Trustees purchased the home and property adjoining the Library which today provides administrative offices and additional parking.

A referendum to fully renovate and expand the building by approximately 10,000 square feet, for $14.4 million dollars, with an additional $500,000 from the Library’s capital fund, was defeated by tax-payers on November 14, 2017.

An October 2019 referendum to fully renovate and expand the building by approximately 3,000 square feet, for $9.4 million dollars, with an additional $500,000 from the Library’s capital fund, was passed by tax-payers.

=== "Windows on Wellwood" Project ===
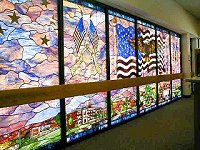
Lindenhurst Memorial Library Windows on Wellwood

As the end of the 20th century approached, there was concern that without a deliberate effort to honor veterans, both deceased and living, their sacrifices would soon be forgotten. In an attempt to prevent this from happening, the Lindenhurst Memorial Library Board of Trustees began discussing ways in which they could reinforce the message to the community that the library is a living memorial to the veterans who perished in the fight for the ideals of democracy.

The trustees inaugurated a project to design and install a series of Lexan-protected stained glass memorial windows on the library's Wellwood Avenue window wall. On September 24, 1998, the Windows on Wellwood project committee met for the first time. The committee’s task was to solicit and review original designs for the windows, select an artist to interpret the design in stained glass, and raise funds for the project. Representatives from the library, the Friends of the Arts, Lindenhurst’s veterans’ organizations, and the community were in attendance. Over the course of the year, many people worked to turn this dream into reality.

On November 7, 1999, following the parade in Lindenhurst to commemorate Veteran's Day, the memorial stained glass windows were unveiled and dedicated before an excited crowd of several hundred people. The windows completely fill the window space in an area measuring approximately 22 feet (6.7 m) by 7 feet (2.1 m) on the Wellwood Avenue side of the library building.

=== "Commemorative Stars" ===
As part of the fundraising effort for the "Windows on Wellwood" project, two hundred thirty blue and fifteen engraved gold stars were bought to honor living or deceased veterans. The gold stars, dedicated to those who were killed in action, are mounted directly on the windows. A special oak cabinet was constructed to house the two hundred thirty blue stars. The cabinet, located under three small stained glass windows, is engraved with the motto, "For Those Who Served". The cabinet was dedicated before a large gathering of veterans, legislators and community members on Memorial Day weekend, May 27, 2000.

The Gold Stars mounted directly on the windows are in honor of the following veterans:

- Edward John Burns
- James Castle
- Michael Collins
- P.F.C., Michael E. Davis
- P.F.C, Robert Andrew Dorner
- Joe DiLandro
- William Michael Fink
- William F. Kenny
- Johann Maier (Civil War)
- Cpl. Wayne J. Marquardt
- Adam J. Muller
- Frank Poldino
- Thomas Poldino
- Melvin J. Robertson
- Sgt. Timothy J. Shelton
- Jack Matthew Wade

== Administration ==
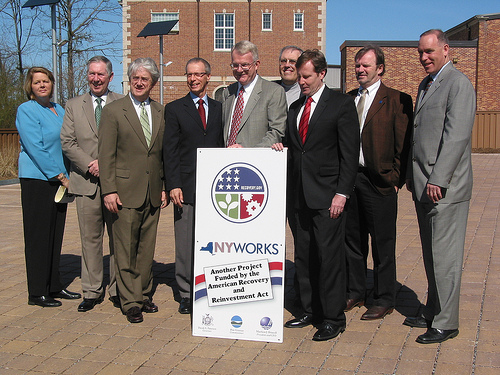
Lindenhurst Memorial Library Administration

The Lindenhurst Memorial Library is governed by a five-member Board of Trustees, elected by the Lindenhurst School District residents. Each trustee serves a five-year term. The library is funded by the Lindenhurst School District taxpayers. The current library director is Lisa Kropp.
