= Bosqueville Independent School District =

School district in Texas

Location
- 7636 Rock Creek Rd. Waco, Texas ESC Region 12 USA
- Coordinates: 31°37′4″N 97°11′44″W

District information
- Type: Independent school district
- Grades: Kindergarten through 12
- Superintendent: Mr. Skeeler
- Schools: 3 (2009-10)
- NCES District ID: 4810910

Students and staff
- Students: 580 (2010-11)
- Teachers: 44.75 (2009-10) (on full-time equivalent (FTE) basis)
- Student–teacher ratio: 12.63 (2009-10)
- Athletic conference: UIL Class 2A Football Division I
- District mascot: Bulldogs
- Colors: Royal Blue, Black, White

Other information
- TEA District Accountability Rating for 2011-12: Academically Acceptable
- Website: Bosqueville ISD

Bosqueville Independent School District is a public school district in Bosqueville, McLennan County, Texas (USA). The district operates one high school, Bosqueville High School.

A significant portion of the district is in the city limits of Waco.

== Finances ==
As of the 2010–2011 school year, the appraised valuation of property in the district was $122,746,000. The maintenance tax rate was $0.117 and the bond tax rate was $0.038 per $100 of appraised valuation.

== Academic achievement ==
In 2011, the school district was rated "academically acceptable" by the Texas Education Agency. Forty-nine percent of districts in Texas in 2011 received the same rating. No state accountability ratings will be given to districts in 2012. A school district in Texas can receive one of four possible rankings from the Texas Education Agency: Exemplary (the highest possible ranking), Recognized, Academically Acceptable, and Academically Unacceptable (the lowest possible ranking).

Historical district TEA accountability ratings

- 2011: Academically Acceptable
- 2010: Recognized
- 2009: Recognized
- 2008: Academically Acceptable
- 2007: Recognized
- 2006: Recognized
- 2005: Academically Acceptable
- 2004: Recognized

== Schools ==
In the 2011–2012 school year, the district had students in four schools.

Regular instructional

- Bosqueville High School (Grades 6-12)
- Bosqueville Elementary (Grades Pre-K-5)

JJAEP instructional

- Challenge Academy (Grades 6-12)

DAEP instructional

- Bosqueville DAEP (Grades 5-12)

== Special programs ==
=== Athletics ===
Bosqueville High School participates in the boys sports of baseball, basketball, football, and wrestling. The school participates in the girls sports of basketball, softball, and volleyball. For the 2012 through 2014 school years, Bosqueville High School will play football in UIL Class 1A Division I.

== See also ==
- List of school districts in Texas
- List of high schools in Texas
