= Lindenhurst Senior High School =

Lindenhurst High School

Location
- 300 Charles Street; Lindenhurst, New York 11757; United States; 40.6973°N 73.3652°W

Information
- Type: Secondary Public
- Motto: Bulldog
- Established: 1841
- Principal: Candice Brodie
- Assistant Principal: James Campbell; Linda Flannelly; Derek Schuelein
- Teaching staff: 160.73 (FTE)
- Grades: 9th – 12th
- Enrollment: 1,863 (2024–2025)
- Student to teacher ratio: 11.53
- Colors: Green and white
- Athletics: Cross country, Football, Lacrosse, Track, etc.
- Team name: Bulldogs
- Website: www.lindenhurstschools.org

Lindenhurst Senior High School (LHS) is a public high school in Lindenhurst, New York on the South Shore of Long Island. The high school is the sole high school of the Lindenhurst Union Free School District, which includes the Village of Lindenhurst and North Lindenhurst.

== Notable alumni ==
This is a partial list of notable alumni of Lindenhurst Senior High School. Names on this list should either have an accompanying existing article link which verifies they are an alumnus, or reliable sources as footnotes against the name showing they are a notable alumnus.

- Gia Allemand (Class of 2001) - actress, model, and reality television contestant
- Jack Barry (Class of 1935) - television personality
- Pat Benatar (Class of 1971) - four-time Grammy Award winning singer
- Teddy Castellucci (Class of 1983) - composer
- Stephanie Finochio (Class of 1989) - stuntwoman, actress and professional wrestler, who competed for Total Nonstop Action Wrestling and World Wrestling Entertainment
- Charles J. Gradante (Class of 1963) hedge fund expert
- Ryan LaFlare - retired adult actor mixed martial arts fighter, competed in the Welterweight division for the Ultimate Fighting Championship
- Dan Lauria (Class of 1965) - actor
- Joe Levelis (Class of 1979) - former USFL player
- Sal LoCascio (Class of 1985) - Hall of Fame former Lacrosse goaltender and coach
- Doug Murray (comics) (Class of 1965), Co-creator and writer of the award-winning Marvel Comics series The 'Nam
- Rosanne Sorrentino (Class of 1986) - actress
- Jeremy Ruckert (Class of 2018) - Tight End for the New York Jets
- Trista Seara (Class of 2016) - Winger, Right Back Kdz. Ereğli Belediye Spor

== Notable faculty ==
- Joy Behar, From the late 1960s to the early 1970s, she taught English

== See also ==
- List of bulldog mascots
