= Wayne Moses =

American football player and coach (1955–2024)

- Moses, c. 1981

Biographical details
- Born: January 11, 1955; New Gulf, Texas, U.S.
- Died: March 7, 2024 (aged 69); California, U.S.

Playing career
- 1973–1977: Washington
- Position: CB

Coaching career (HC unless noted)
- 1979: Cal State Fullerton (RB)
- 1980: North Carolina State (Asst. DB)
- 1981–1983: Bowling Green (RB)
- 1984–1985: Rutgers (RB)
- 1986–1988: San Diego State (RB)
- 1989: New Mexico (WR)
- 1990–1995: UCLA (RB)
- 1996: California (RB)
- 1997–2000: Washington (RB)
- 2001: USC (RB)
- 2002–2003: Stanford (RB)
- 2004: Pittsburgh (RB)
- 2005: Stanford (RB)
- 2006–2007: St. Louis Rams (RB)
- 2008–2011: UCLA (RB)
- 2012: Idaho (RB)
- 2013: Army (SB)
- 2014-2015: Hawaii (RB)
- 2017-2024: CMS (RB)

Wayne Moses (January 11, 1955 – March 7, 2024) was an American football coach. He later served as running backs coach under head coach Robb Akey at Idaho.

== Playing career ==
=== College playing career ===
Moses was a starter for the Washington Huskies football team, where he played cornerback. While at the University of Washington, he was a member of the Huskies' 1978 Rose Bowl championship team.

== Coaching career ==
Moses was one of Pete Carroll's first hires once he became head coach of the USC Trojans in 2001. Between USC and coaching the UCLA Bruins, Moses was a running backs coach for the National Football League St. Louis Rams and also coached for Stanford and Pitt.

Inland Empire and East Bay were the areas of his recruitment responsibility.

Moses coached many notable players and had successful seasons under his watch including

- 1984 at Rutgers: RB Albert Smith ran for 869 yards and 9 TD in a 7-3 season.
- 1986 at San Diego State: RB Chris Hardy ran for 947 yards and 12 TD in an 8-4 season.
- 1987 at San Diego State: RB Paul Hewitt ran for 1,001 yards and 18 TD.
- 1988 at San Diego State: RB Paul Hewitt ran for 1,055 yards and 10 TD.
- 1991 at UCLA: RB Kevin Williams ran for 1,141 yards and 8 TD.
- 1994 at UCLA: RB Sharmon Shah ran for 1,227 yards and 4 TD.
- 1995 at UCLA: RB Karim Abdul-Jabbar ran for 1,571 yards and 12 TD.

== Personal life and death ==
Moses received his bachelor's degree in political science in 1977. Prior to his football career, he trained as an agent with the FBI at Quantico, Virginia. In San Dimas High School, he played both football and basketball.

Moses and his wife, Rosalind, had two daughters, Valerie and Kimberly. He died in California on March 7, 2024, at the age of 69.

== See also ==
- 2009 UCLA Bruins football team
