= New Gulf Airport =

- IATA: none; ICAO: none; FAA LID: 1TX4

Summary
- Airport type: Public
- Owner: H & L New Gulf
- Serves: New Gulf, Texas
- Elevation AMSL: 100 ft / 30 m
- Coordinates: 29°16′34″N 095°53′19″W

Map
- Location of airport in Texas

Runways
Direction	Length		Surface
Direction	ft	m	Surface
15/33	4,300	1,311	Asphalt

Statistics (2008)
- Aircraft operations: 100
- Source: Federal Aviation Administration

New Gulf Airport (FAA LID: 1TX4, formerly T17) is a privately owned, public use airport located two nautical miles (4 km) east of the central business district of New Gulf, in Wharton County, Texas, United States.

== Facilities and aircraft ==
New Gulf Airport covers an area of 50 acres (20 ha) at an elevation of 100 feet (30 m) above mean sea level. It has one runway designated 15/33 with an asphalt surface measuring 4,300 by 75 feet (1,311 x 23 m).

For the 12-month period ending September 18, 2008, the airport had 100 general aviation aircraft operations.

== See also ==
- List of airports in Texas
