= Boling, Texas =

- CDP
- Interactive map of Boling, Texas
- Coordinates: 29°15′30″N 95°56′37″W
- Country: United States
- State: Texas
- County: Wharton

Area
  - Total: 4.7 sq mi (12 km^{2})
  - Land: 4.65 sq mi (12.0 km^{2})
  - Water: 0.05 sq mi (0.13 km^{2})

Population (2020)
  - Total: 930
  - Density: 200/sq mi (77/km^{2})
- Time zone: UTC-6 (Central (CST))
  - Summer (DST): UTC-5 (CDT)
- Zip Code: 77420

Boling is a census-designated place (CDP) in Wharton County, Texas, United States. It was a new CDP formed from parts of the Boling-Iago CDP prior to the 2010 census. As of the 2020 census, Boling had a population of 930.

== Geography ==
Boling is located at 29°15′30″N 95°56′37″W (29.258398, -95.943552). The CDP has a total area of 4.7 square miles (12 km^{2}), of which 4.65 square miles (12.0 km^{2}) is land and 0.05 square miles (0.13 km^{2}) is water.

== Demographics ==
Historical population
Census	Pop.	Note	%±
2010	1,122		—
2020	930		−17.1%
U.S. Decennial Census; 1850–1900 1910; 1920 1930 1940; 1950 1960 1970; 1980 1990 2000; 2010

Boling first appeared as a census designated place in the 2010 U.S. census.

=== 2020 census ===
Boling CDP, Texas – Racial and ethnic composition Note: the US Census treats Hispanic/Latino as an ethnic category. This table excludes Latinos from the racial categories and assigns them to a separate category. Hispanics/Latinos may be of any race.
Race / Ethnicity (NH = Non-Hispanic)	Pop 2010	Pop 2020	% 2010	% 2020
White alone (NH)	377	279	33.60%	30.00%
Black or African American alone (NH)	80	66	7.13%	7.10%
Native American or Alaska Native alone (NH)	0	1	0.00%	0.11%
Asian alone (NH)	2	3	0.18%	0.32%
Native Hawaiian or Pacific Islander alone (NH)	0	0	0.00%	0.00%
Other race alone (NH)	1	0	0.09%	0.00%
Mixed race or Multiracial (NH)	3	22	0.27%	2.37%
Hispanic or Latino (any race)	659	559	58.73%	60.11%
Total	1,122	930	100.00%	100.00%

== Education ==
It is in the Boling Independent School District. The comprehensive high school of the district is Boling High School.

The Texas Legislature assigns all of Wharton County to Wharton County Junior College.

== History ==
This area was called Floyd's Lane prior to the advent of the New York, Texas & Mexican Railway in 1900. Named for the Bolling family of Virginia, the town name was misspelled when citizens applied for a U. S. Post Office. The economy was based on farming and the railroad until sulphur, oil, and gas were discovered on the Boling dome in 1925. Boling became a boomtown; the population grew from 20 in 1920 to 450 in 1930. Many streets and subdivisions were named for the companies that flocked here. Mineral production was the dominant industry in the area for 70 years.
