= Yale Public Schools =

School district in Oklahoma

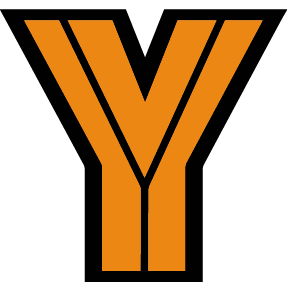

Location
- 315 East Chicago Avenue; Yale, Oklahoma 74085 Payne County United States

District information
- Type: Public, primary, secondary, co-educational
- Motto: Home of the Bulldogs
- Grades: Elementary PK–5; Middle School 6–8; High School 9–12
- Superintendent: Rocky Kennedy
- Schools: 3

Students and staff
- Students: 420 (2018–19)
- Teachers: 26.84 (FTE)
- Athletic conference: 2A

Other information
- Website: www.yale.k12.ok.us/o/yale-school-district

The Yale Public School District is located in Yale, Oklahoma, United States. The Yale school district has three schools.

The district is managed by Superintendent Rocky Kennedy, who works under the direction of a five-person board.

The mascot of both the district and the high school is the Bulldog.

== Schools ==
=== High school ===
- Yale High School (Grades 9–12)

=== Middle school ===
- Yale Middle School (Grades 6–8)

=== Elementary school ===
- Yale Elementary School (Grades PK–5)
