= Boling High School =

Public school in Boling Iago, Wharton County, Texas, United States

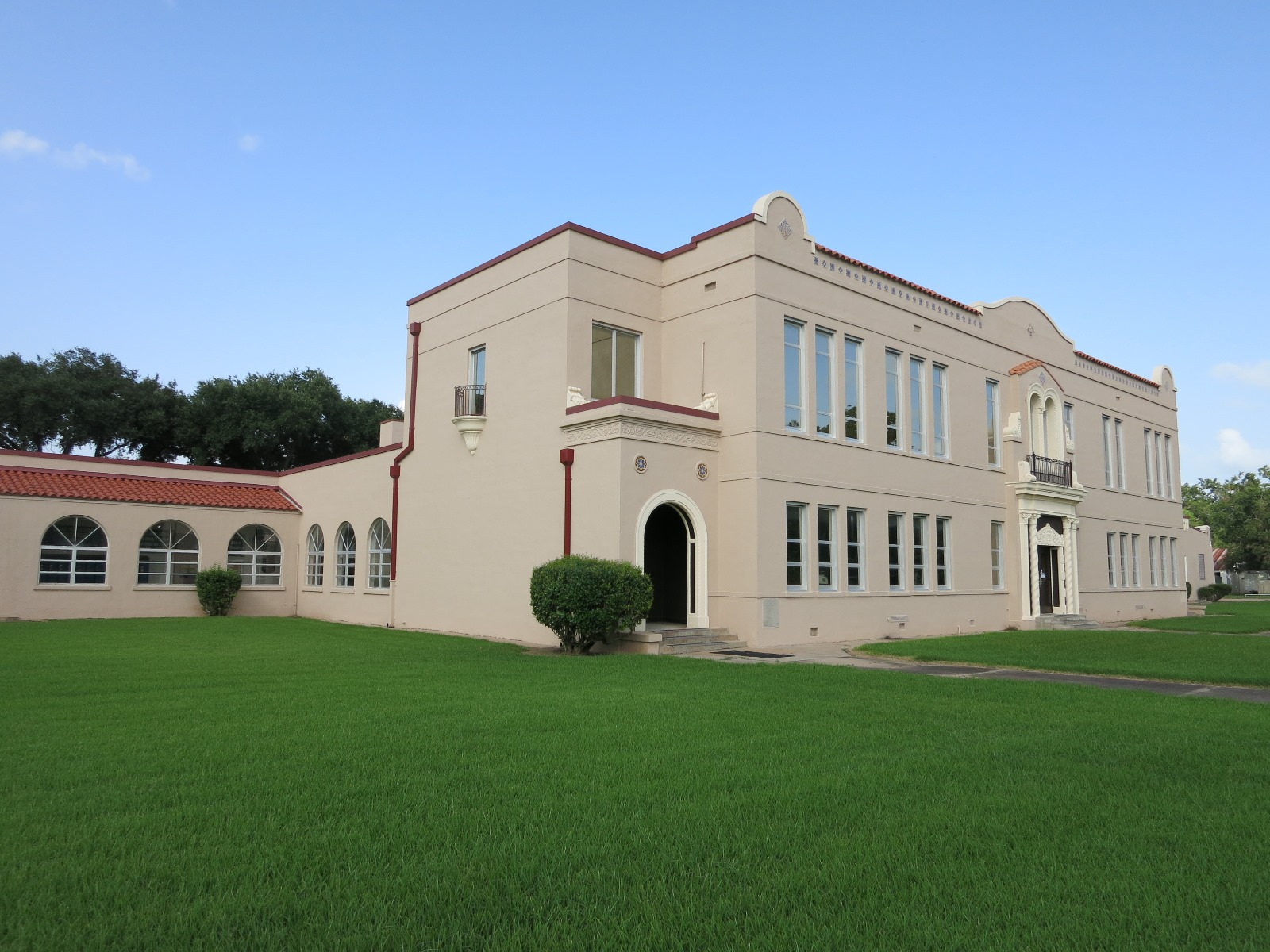

Location
- 407 Atlantic Avenue; Boling-lago, Texas 78642; United States; 29.26431°N 95.9400°W

Information
- School type: Public
- Established: c. 1929
- School district: Boling Independent School District
- Principal: David Calbert
- Teaching staff: 22.33 (on FTE basis)
- Grades: 9-12
- Enrollment: 328 (2024-2025)
- Student to teacher ratio: 14.69
- Colors: Green and white
- Athletics conference: UIL 3A
- Mascot: Bulldog
- Website: bhs.bolingisd.net

Boling High School is a public high school serving students grades 9 to 12 located within the Boling-Iago census-designated place in Wharton County, Texas, United States. It is zoned to and attended by students in unincorporated Wharton County including the communities of Boling-Iago, the eastern portion of Hungerford, the boundary running roughly to US 59 Business, Burr, and Newgulf. A small part of the district is within the boundaries of unincorporated Matagorda County, including Pledger. The school is one of the two secondary schools and the only high school serving the Boling Independent School District. It is part of UIL region 3A. In 2022, the school received a "B" rating from the Texas Education Agency.

== Athletics ==
=== Athletics ===
Boling High School participates in the boys' sports of baseball, basketball, football, power lifting, cross county, and track. The school participates in the girl's sports of basketball, softball, power lifting, cross country, and volleyball. Boling High School sports compete in UIL Class 3A (Division II in football).

The Boling Bulldogs participate in the following sports:

- Baseball
- Basketball
- Cross country
- Football
- Golf
- Powerlifting
- Softball
- Tennis
- Track and field
- Volleyball

=== State championships ===
- Football
  - 1972 (2A)

== Notable alumni ==
- Brionne Kierra Butler (born 1999), American professional volleyball player
- Billy Waddy, former NFL wide receiver, Los Angeles Rams & Minnesota Vikings
