= Bosqueville High School =

Location
- 7636 Rock Creek Road; Waco, Texas 76708-7225; United States; 31°37′4″N 97°11′41″W

Information
- School type: Public high school
- School district: Bosqueville Independent School District
- Principal: Dustin Thomas
- Staff: 20.25 (FTE)
- Grades: 6-12
- Enrollment: 221 (2023–2024)
- Student to teacher ratio: 10.91
- Colors: Blue, black, and white
- Athletics conference: UIL Class AA
- Mascot: Bulldog
- Website: Bosqueville High School

Bosqueville High School or Bosqueville Secondary School is a public high school located in a Bosqueville on the north edge of Waco, Texas, United States that serves about 300 students in grades 6-12. It is part of the Bosqueville Independent School District and classified as a 2A school by the UIL. The district covers unincorporated Bosqueville and parts of Waco. Even though the district is mostly in Bosqueville area, it is actually addressed to Waco. In 2015, the school was rated "Met Standard" by the Texas Education Agency.

== Athletics ==
The Bosqueville Bulldogs compete in the following sports: Cross Country, Volleyball, Football, Basketball, Golf, Tennis, Track, Softball and Baseball.

=== State Titles ===
- Baseball -
  - 2008(1A)
- Softball -
  - 2007(1A)

==== State Finalists ====
- Softball
  - 2026(2A/D1)
