= Tech (mascot) =

Mascot of Louisiana Tech University

- Tech XX's debut portrait
- University: Louisiana Tech University
- Conference: SBC
- Description: Live Bulldog
- Origin of name: Louisiana Tech
- First seen: 1930
- Related mascot(s): Champ

Tech is the name of the fawn and white lineage of English bulldogs which serves as the live mascot of Louisiana Tech University. Tech is owned by the Student Government Association and resides with either a faculty member or local alumnus selected by the SGA. The first live mascot, Tech I, was donated in 1930 by the Matthews family. Tech XIX served as the university's official mascot from 2001 until 2007. He was retired in November 2007 after surviving a heat stroke suffered at a Louisiana Tech summer orientation session. Tech XIX died in 2009. On January 22, 2008, Tech XX was officially installed as the new official mascot and debuted at La Tech's men's basketball game against Nevada on January 26, 2008. Tech XX was born in Licking, Missouri, on October 9, 2007, and is the son of Kahuna Mighty Sampson and Abbie Jane Kofax. Tech XX was in the care of Ruston veterinarian and Tech alumnus Dr. Patrick Sexton.

On July 30, 2012, Sexton Animal Health Center announced that Tech XX had been missing since 8 pm the night before after being let outside. There was a $2000 reward posted. However on Wednesday afternoon, August 1, 2012, Sexton Animal Health Center announced that an employee lied about Tech XX being missing. The now former employee left the dog outside too long, and it died of heat stroke on Sunday, July 29, 2012.

== History ==
The bulldog may have been chosen as mascot of the university in 1899. According to legend, five students adopted a bulldog that had been wandering around campus that year. A fire broke out among the students' house not long after. The adopted bulldog barked at his new masters until they all awoke, allowing them to escape the burning building. The bulldog, however, had inhaled too much of the smoke and never made it out of the building before it burned to the ground. The students buried the dog on campus.

=== Stuffed mascot era ===
Prior to the donation of the first live bulldog, the university owned a large stuffed dog that served as the mascot. An article in the Ruston Daily Leader states,

The old Dog has cauliflower ears, a few adhesive bandages and his paint is faded, showing evidence of having engaged in quite a few battles, and if his looks do not belie him he has faith in the relinquishing of his place as mascot, so emblematic of his Bulldog "tenacity."

=== Tech I ===
In October 1930, the first bulldog mascot was given to the university by the Matthews family. Two of the Matthews boys, Henry and Thomas, were freshmen at Tech and became the new mascot's caretakers. Tech I died of internal hemorrhaging on August 17, 1932, and was buried under the athletic field.

== See also ==
- List of individual dogs
