= Newgulf, Texas =

- Unincorporated community
- Location within Texas Location within the United States
- Coordinates: 29°15′19″N 95°54′00″W
- Country: United States
- State: Texas
- County: Wharton
- Elevation: 69 ft (21 m)
- Time zone: UTC-6 (Central (CST))
  - Summer (DST): UTC-5 (CDT)
- Area code: 979
- GNIS feature ID: 1363843

Newgulf (or New Gulf) is an unincorporated community in Wharton County, Texas, United States. According to the Handbook of Texas, the community had a population of ten in 2009. It is located within the Greater Houston metropolitan area.

== Geography ==
Newgulf is located on Farm to Market Road 1301, 12 mi (19 km) east of Wharton and 3 mi (4.8 km) east of Boling in the extreme eastern corner of Wharton County. It is also on the Boling Dome between the San Bernard River and Caney Creek.

== Demographics ==
Historical population
Census	Pop.	Note	%±
1950	1,805		—
1960	1,419		−21.4%
U.S. Decennial Census; 1850–1900 1910; 1920 1930 1940; 1950 1960 1970; 1980 1990 2000; 2010

Newgulf was listed as an unincorporated community in the 1950 U.S. census and 1960 U.S. census; it was not listed thereafter.

== Education ==
As of 1995, Newgulf's functioning elementary school is part of the Boling Independent School District.

== Infrastructure ==
Newgulf is home to New Gulf Airport, a private-use airport.

== Notable person ==
- Wayne Moses, football coach who served as running back coach for the Idaho Vandals.

== Gallery ==
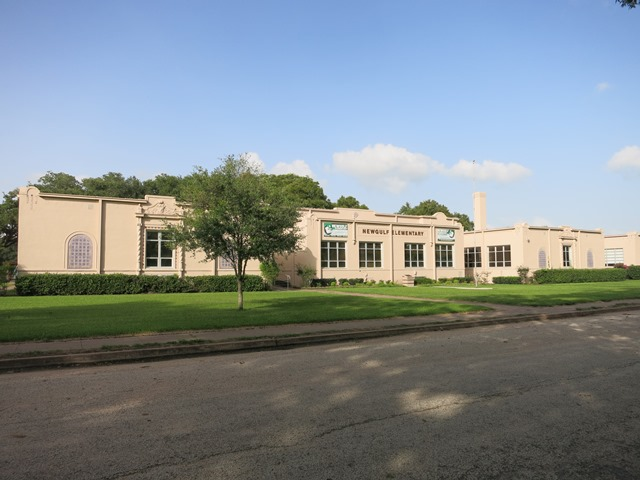
Newgulf Elementary School

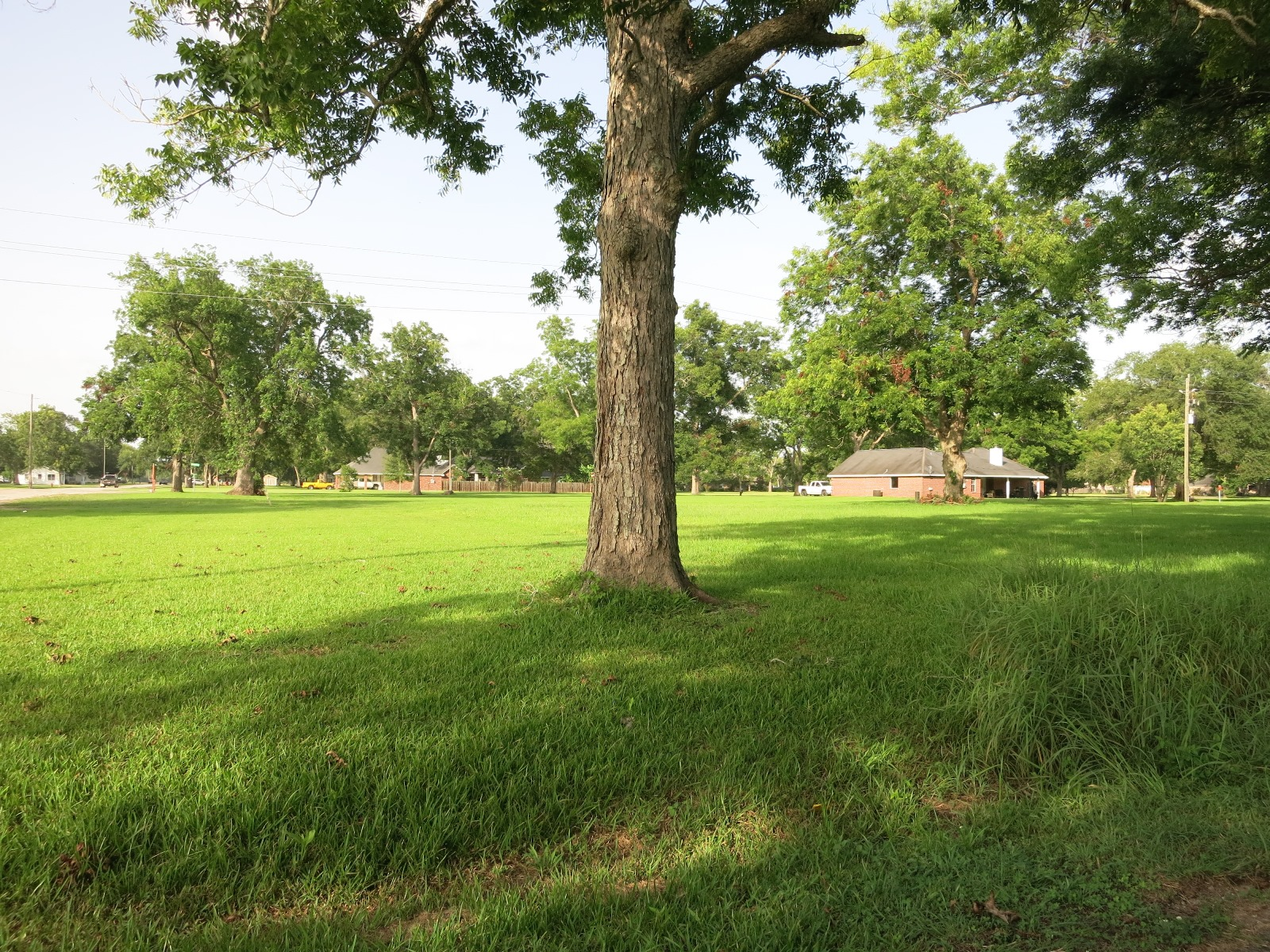
New homes in Newgulf

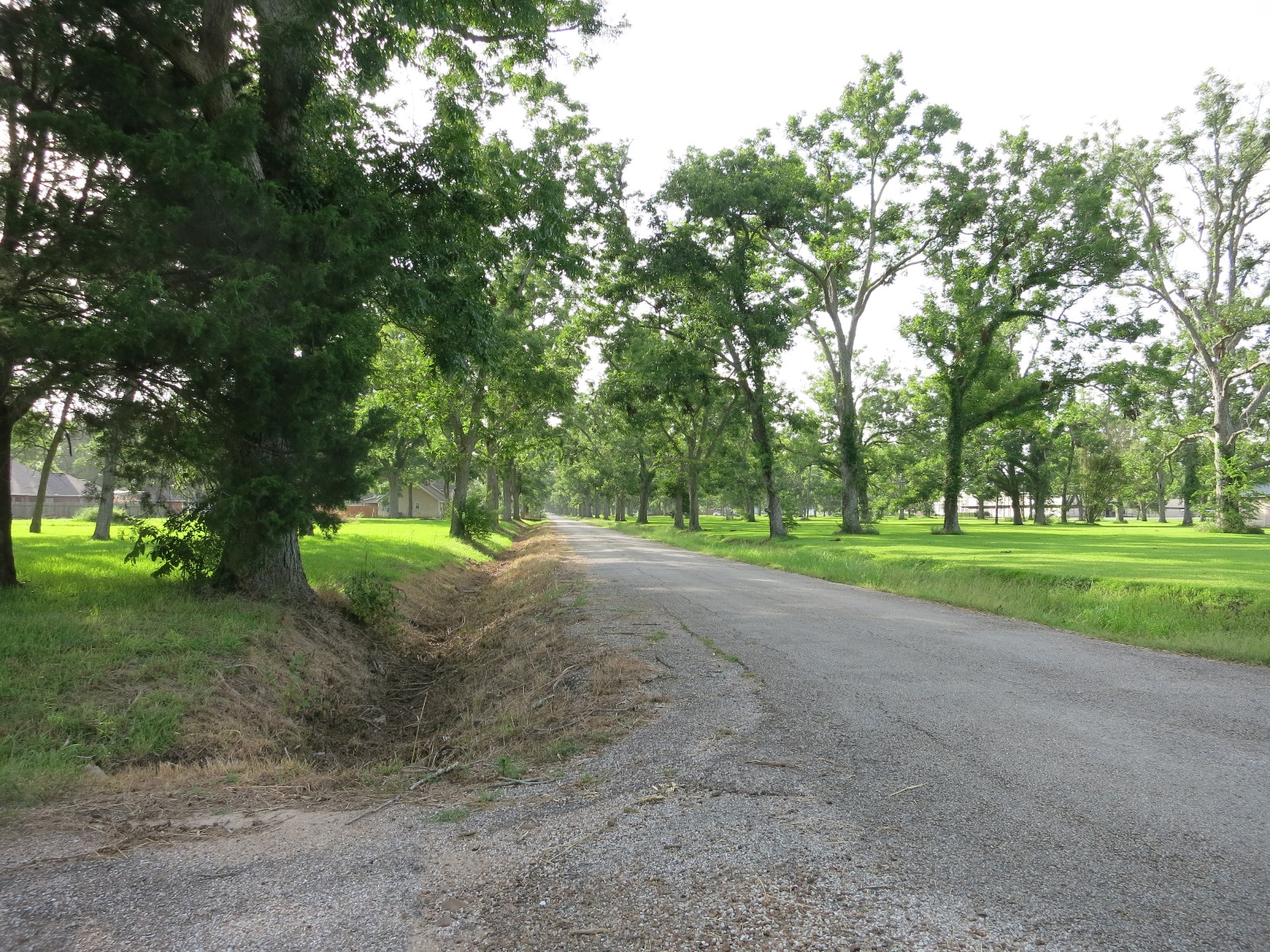
Mostly empty tree-lined streets

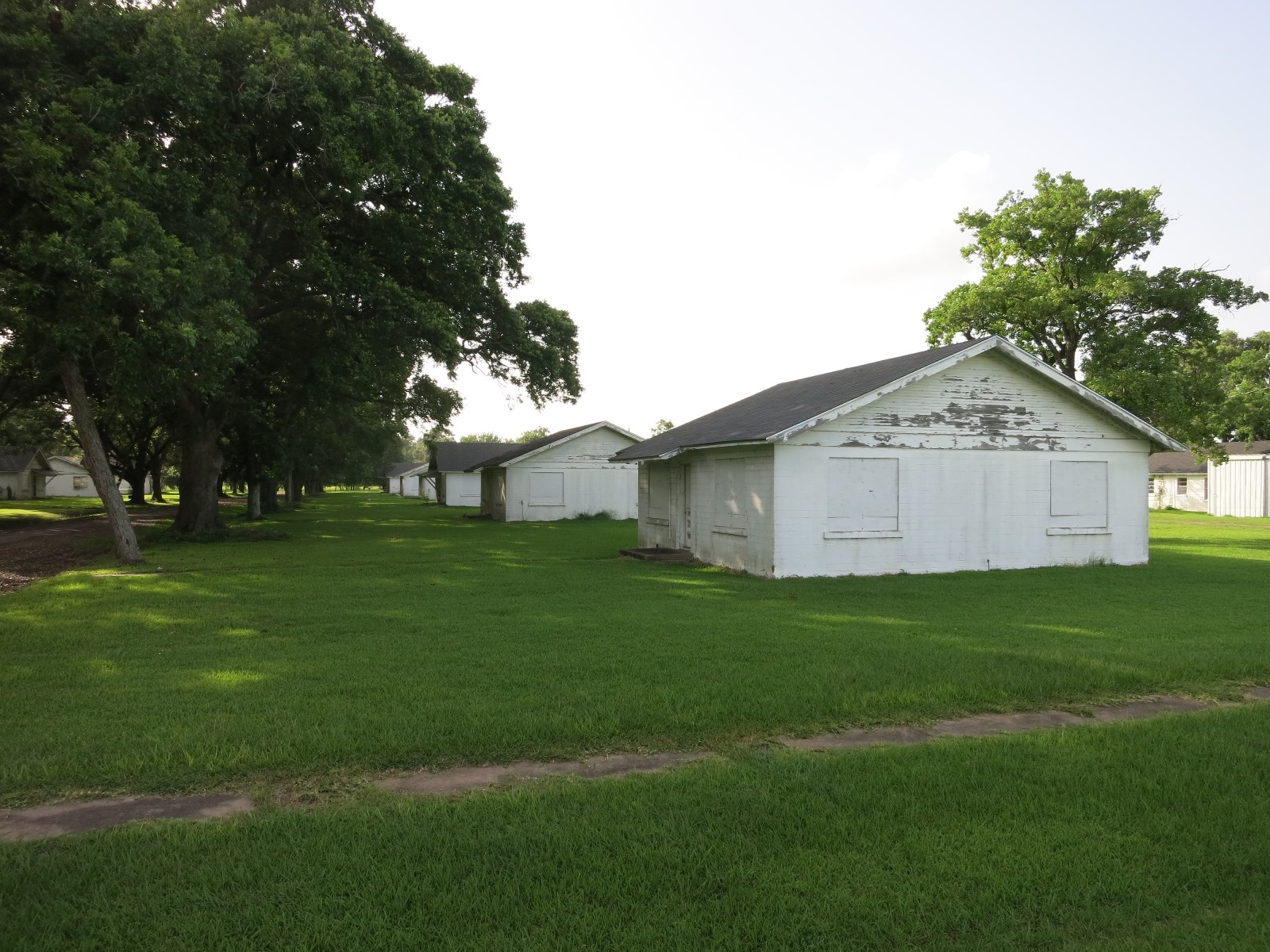
Row of old company houses

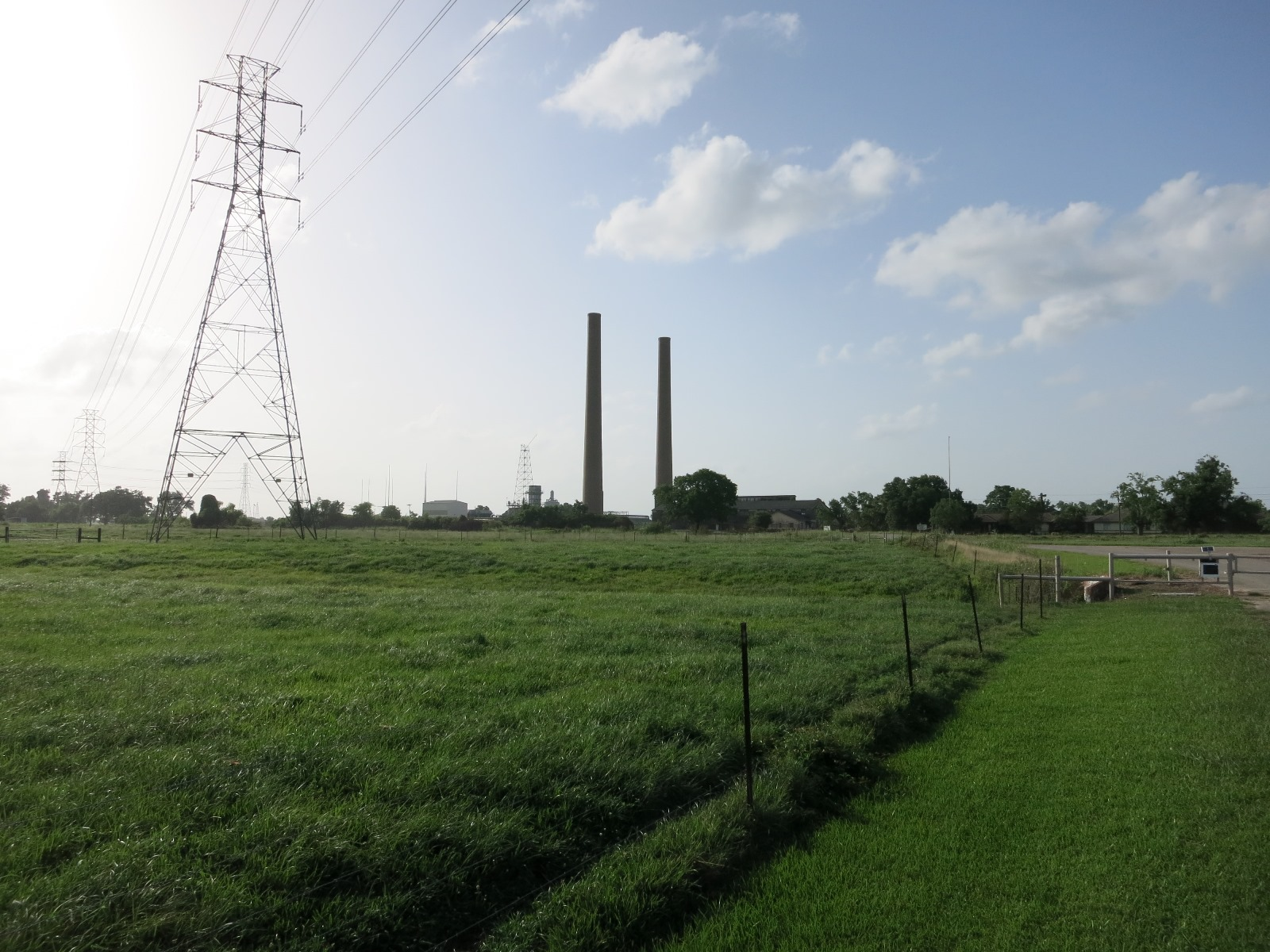
Closed Texas Gulf Sulphur Company plant
