= Boling Independent School District =

School district in Texas, United States

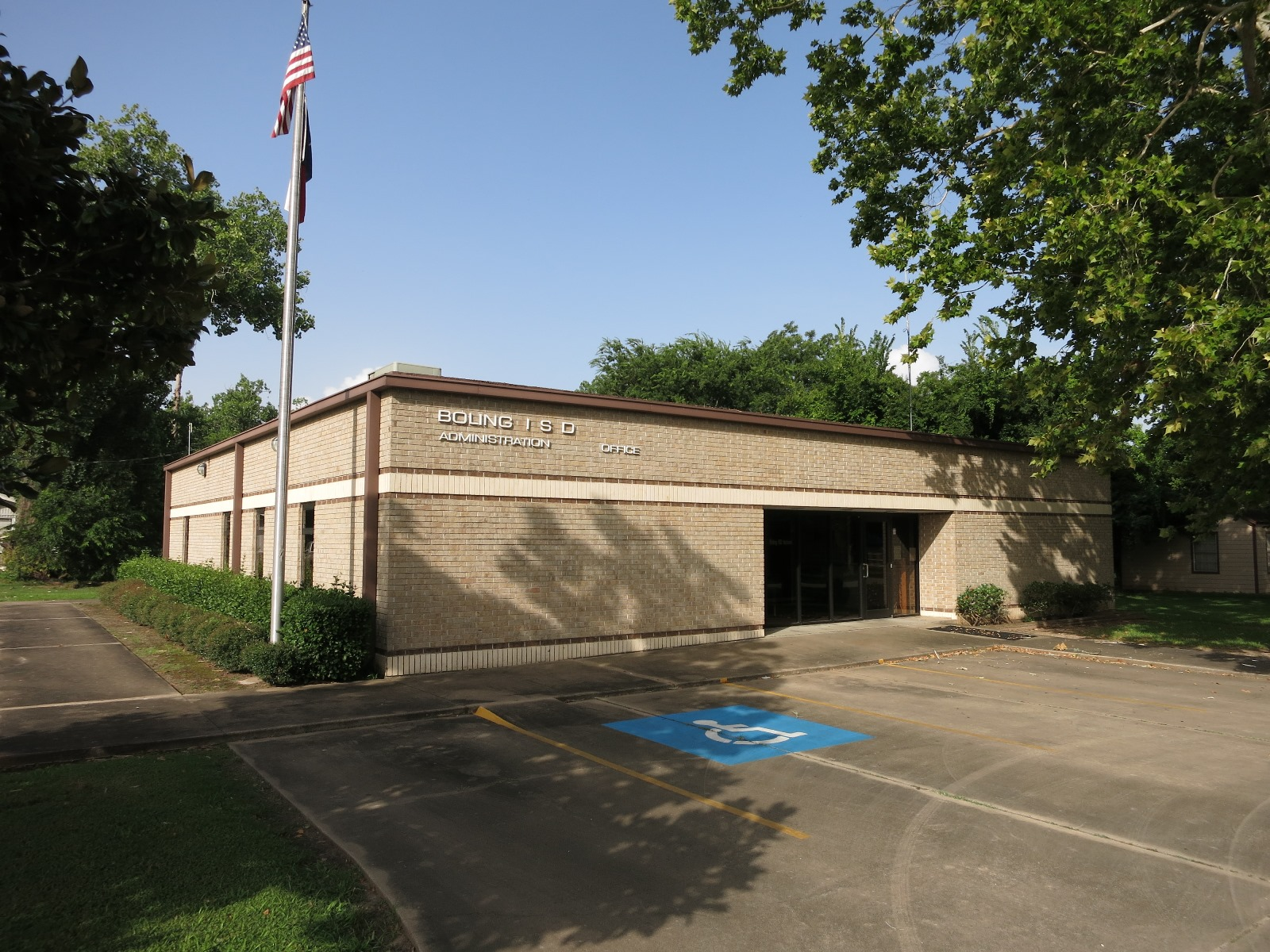
- Boling ISD Administration Building

Location
- 301 Texas Ave; Boling, Texas ESC Region 3 United States
- Coordinates: 29°15′52″N 95°56′30″W

District information
- Type: Independent school district
- Grades: Pre-K through 12
- Established: 1928
- Superintendent: Wade Stidevent
- Schools: 3
- NCES District ID: 4810780

Students and staff
- Students: 1,145 (2023–2024)
- Teachers: 74.85 (on an FTE basis)
- Student–teacher ratio: 15.30:1
- Athletic conference: UIL Class 3A
- District mascot: Bulldogs
- Colors: Green, White

Other information
- TEA District Accountability Rating for 2011-12: Recognized
- Website: Boling ISD

Boling Independent School District is a public school district based in the community of Boling, Texas in the United States. Located in Wharton County, The district spans 147 square miles (380Km), a small portion of the district extends into Matagorda County.

== Finances ==
As of the 2010–2011 school year, the appraised valuation of property in the district was $199,698,000. The maintenance tax rate was $0.104 and the bond tax rate was $0.000 per $100 of appraised valuation.

== Academic achievement ==
In 2011, the school district was rated "recognized" by the Texas Education Agency. Thirty-five percent of districts in Texas in 2011 received the same rating. No state accountability ratings will be given to districts in 2012. A school district in Texas can receive one of four possible rankings from the Texas Education Agency: Exemplary (the highest possible ranking), Recognized, Academically Acceptable, and Academically Unacceptable (the lowest possible ranking).

Historical district TEA accountability ratings

- 2011: Recognized
- 2010: Recognized
- 2009: Recognized
- 2008: Academically Acceptable
- 2007: Academically Acceptable
- 2006: Academically Acceptable
- 2005: Academically Acceptable
- 2004: Academically Acceptable

== Schools ==
The district operates three schools.

- Boling High School (Grades 9–12)
- Iago Junior High School (Grades 6–8)
- Newgulf Elementary School (Grades PK-5)
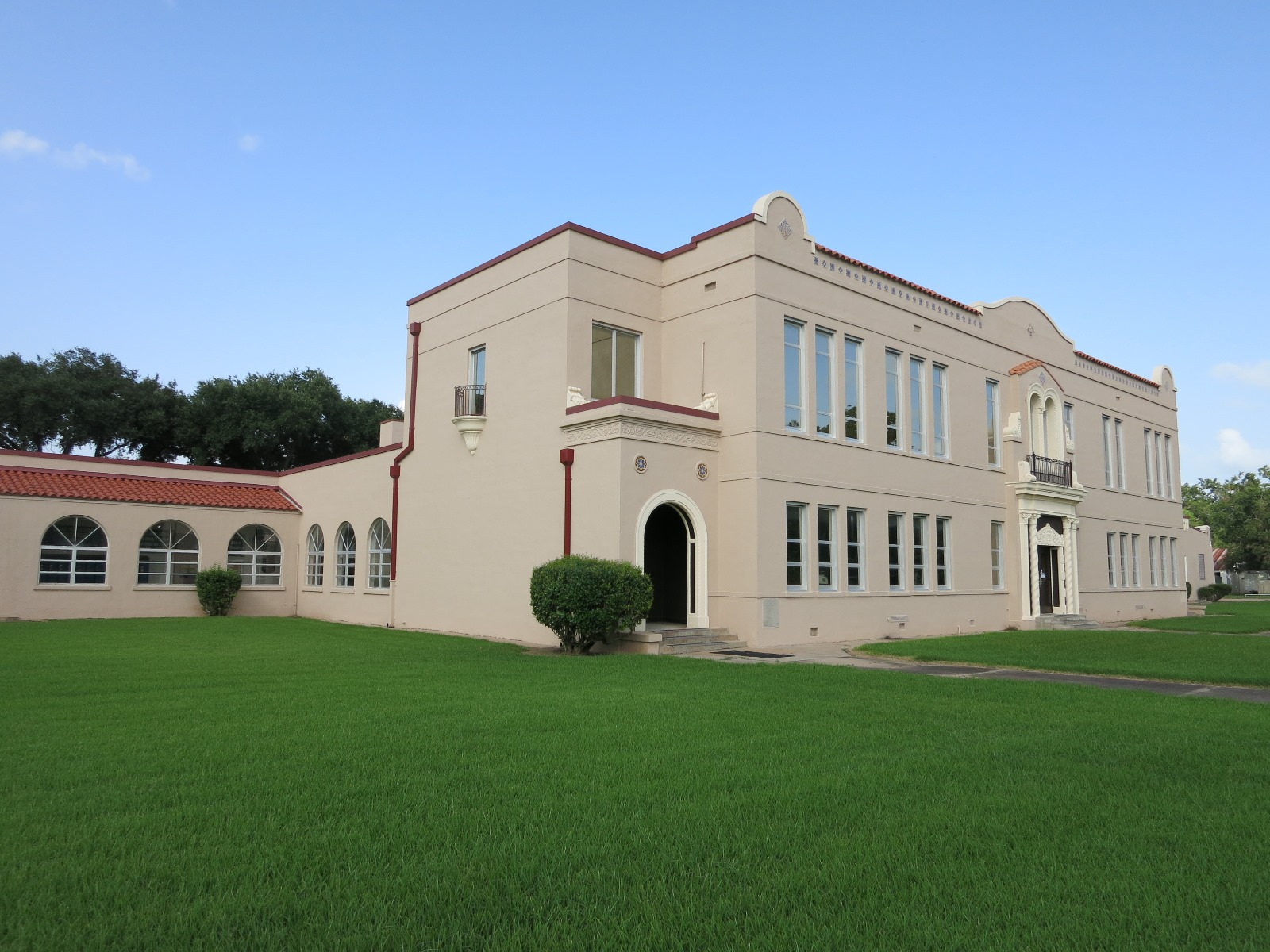
Boling High School

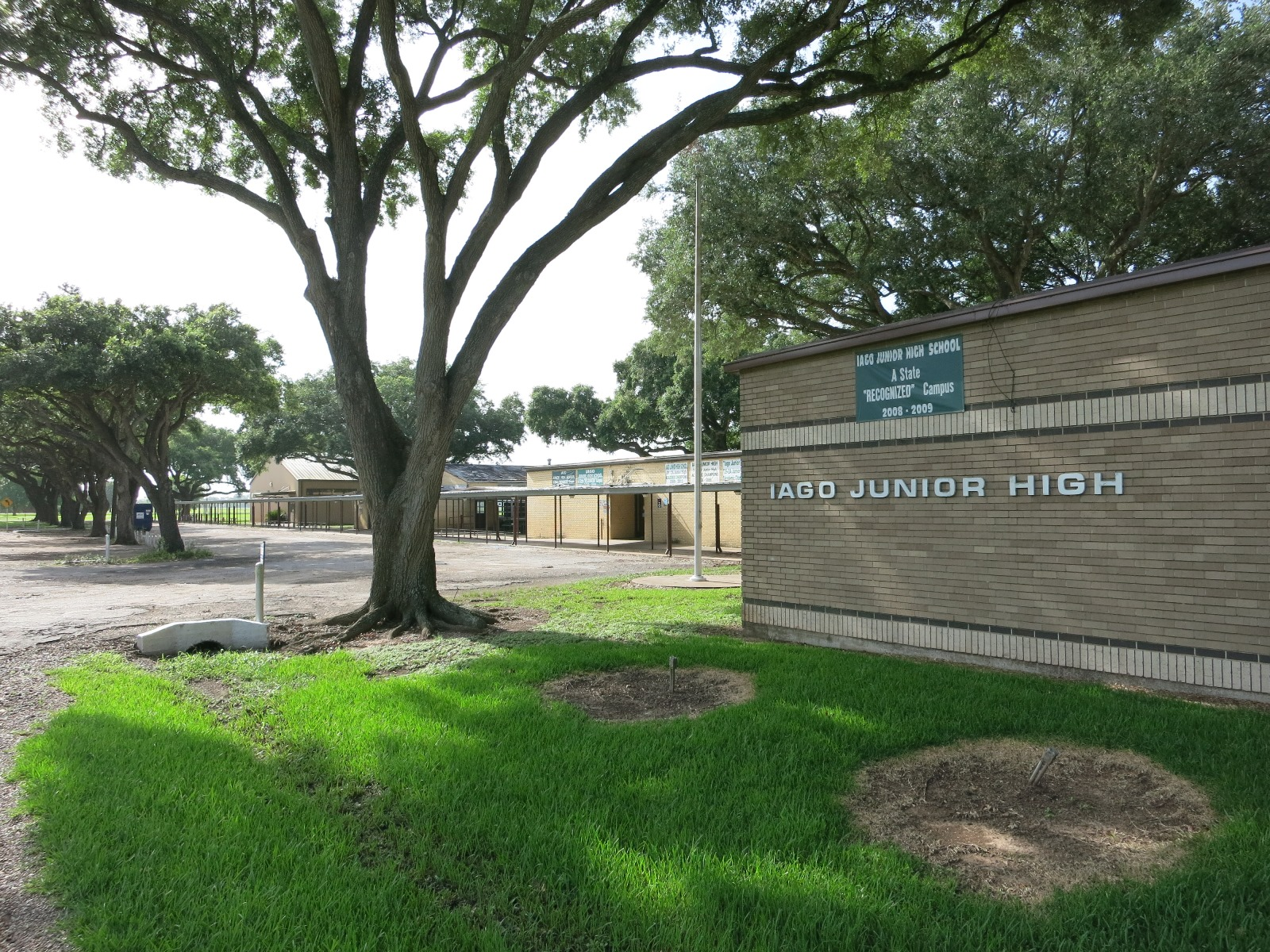
Iago Junior High School

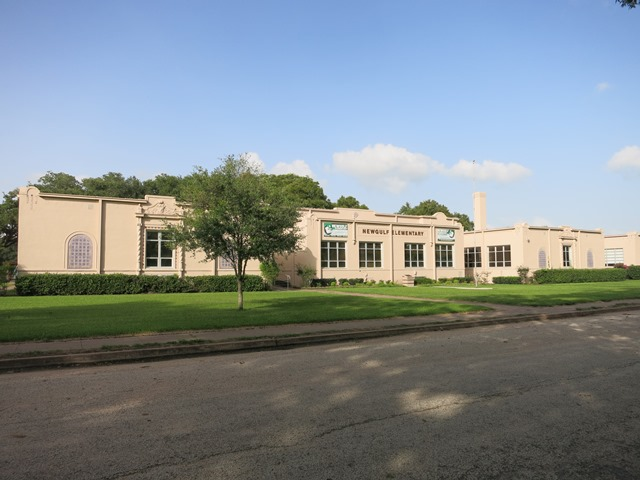
Newgulf Elementary School

== See also ==
- List of school districts in Texas
- List of high schools in Texas
- Newgulf, Texas
