= Yale High School =

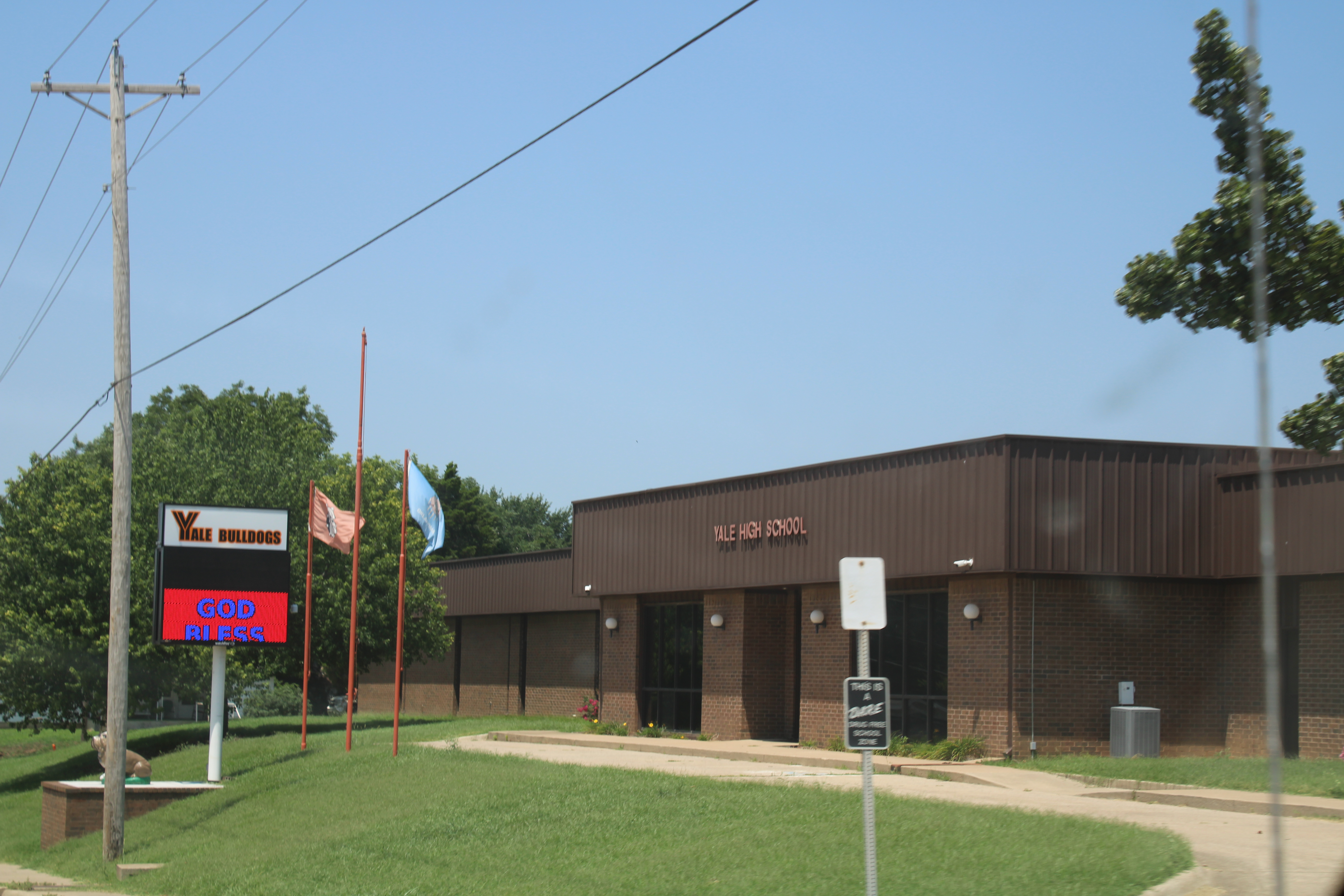

Location
- 315 East Chicago Avenue; Yale, Oklahoma 74085; United States; 36.1165°N 96.6958°W

Information
- Type: Public, secondary school
- School district: Yale Public Schools
- Principal: Craig Garner
- Teaching staff: 7.64 (FTE)
- Grades: 9-12
- Gender: Co-educational
- Enrollment: 119 (2023-2024)
- Student to teacher ratio: 15.58
- Colors: Black and orange
- Athletics conference: OSSAA Class 2A
- Mascot: Bulldog
- Website: Yale Public Schools

Yale High School is a public secondary school in Yale, Oklahoma, United States. It is located at 315 East Chicago Avenue in Yale, Oklahoma and the only high school in Yale Public Schools.

== Extracurricular activities ==
=== Clubs and organizations ===
- 4-H
- FCA
- FFA
- National Honor Society
- Quiz Bowl
- Student Council
- SWAT
- Yearbook

=== Athletics ===
- Baseball
- Basketball
- Softball
- Track and Field
- Football
- Volleyball
