= Boling-Iago, Texas =

- Census-designated place
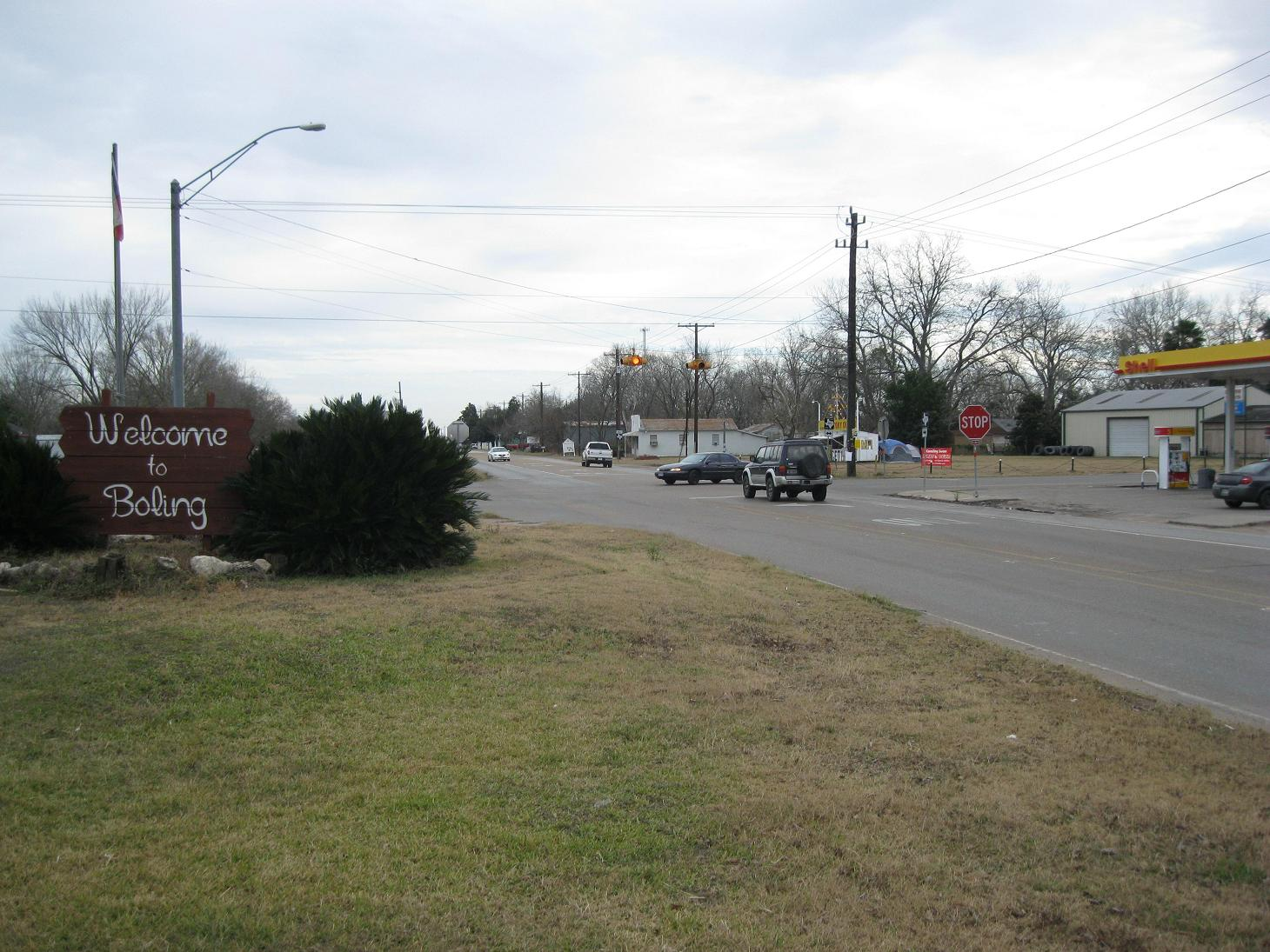
- Welcome to Boling sign at FM 442 and FM 1301

- Location of Boling-Iago, Texas
- Coordinates: 29°15′57″N 95°56′40″W
- Country: United States
- State: Texas
- County: Wharton

Area
  - Total: 4.726 sq mi (12.241 km^{2})
  - Land: 4.669 sq mi (12.093 km^{2})
  - Water: 0.057 sq mi (0.148 km^{2})

Population (2000)
  - Total: 1,271
  - Density: 272.2/sq mi (105.1/km^{2})
- Time zone: UTC-6 (Central (CST))
  - Summer (DST): UTC-5 (CDT)
- ZIP code: 77420
- Area code: 979
- FIPS code: 48-09232

Boling-Iago (/ˈboʊlɪŋ aɪˈeɪɡoʊ/ BOH-ling eye-AY-goh) is a census-designated place (CDP) in Wharton County, Texas, United States. The population was 1,271 as of the 2000 United States census. Boling-Iago is located along Farm to Market Road 1301 about 10 miles (16 km) southeast of Wharton, the county seat. Boling is located at the intersection of FM 1301 and Farm to Market Road 442, while the community of Iago is 1.5 miles (2.4 km) to the northeast at the intersection of FM 1301 and Farm to Market Road 1096. The Boling Independent School District received a Recognized ranking in 2010. The numerous pump jacks and oil tanks in the vicinity indicate that Boling and Iago lie atop oil-bearing rock formations.

Prior to the 2010 census, this CDP was split to form parts of the new Boling and Iago CDPs.

== Geography ==
According to the United States Census Bureau, the Boling-Iago CDP has a total land area of 4.669 square miles (12.093 km^{2}) and a water area of 0.057 square miles (0.148 km^{2}).

Caney Creek meanders from northwest to southeast through the area. To the northwest of Iago, the stream can be found on the south side of Farm to Market Road 1301. Between Iago and Boling the creek crosses to the north side of the highway and loops past Boling on the north. Caney Creek eventually empties into Matagorda Bay near Sargent in Matagorda County.

The local road and property line grid is oriented to the north-northeast in the area between Iago and Wharton. Between Iago and Boling the orientation changes slightly to the northwest. About two miles south of Boling the orientation changes still more to the northeast so that it is at the same angle as the road net around Needville, Texas. FM 1301 does not conform to the road and property line grid.

FM 1301 continues 10.5 miles (16.9 km) to the northeast where it ends at Texas State Highway 60 in Wharton. Pledger in Matagorda County is the next community to the south at a distance of 6.2 miles (10.0 km) along FM 1301. Lane City is 6.8 miles (10.9 km) to the southwest on Farm to Market Road 442. Needville is to the northeast on FM 442. Starting from Iago Farm to Market Road 1096 goes southwest to end at FM 442. The community of Newgulf can be reached by traveling 1.5 miles (2.4 km) southeast on FM 1301 and 1.6 miles (2.6 km) northeast on County Road 190.

== History ==
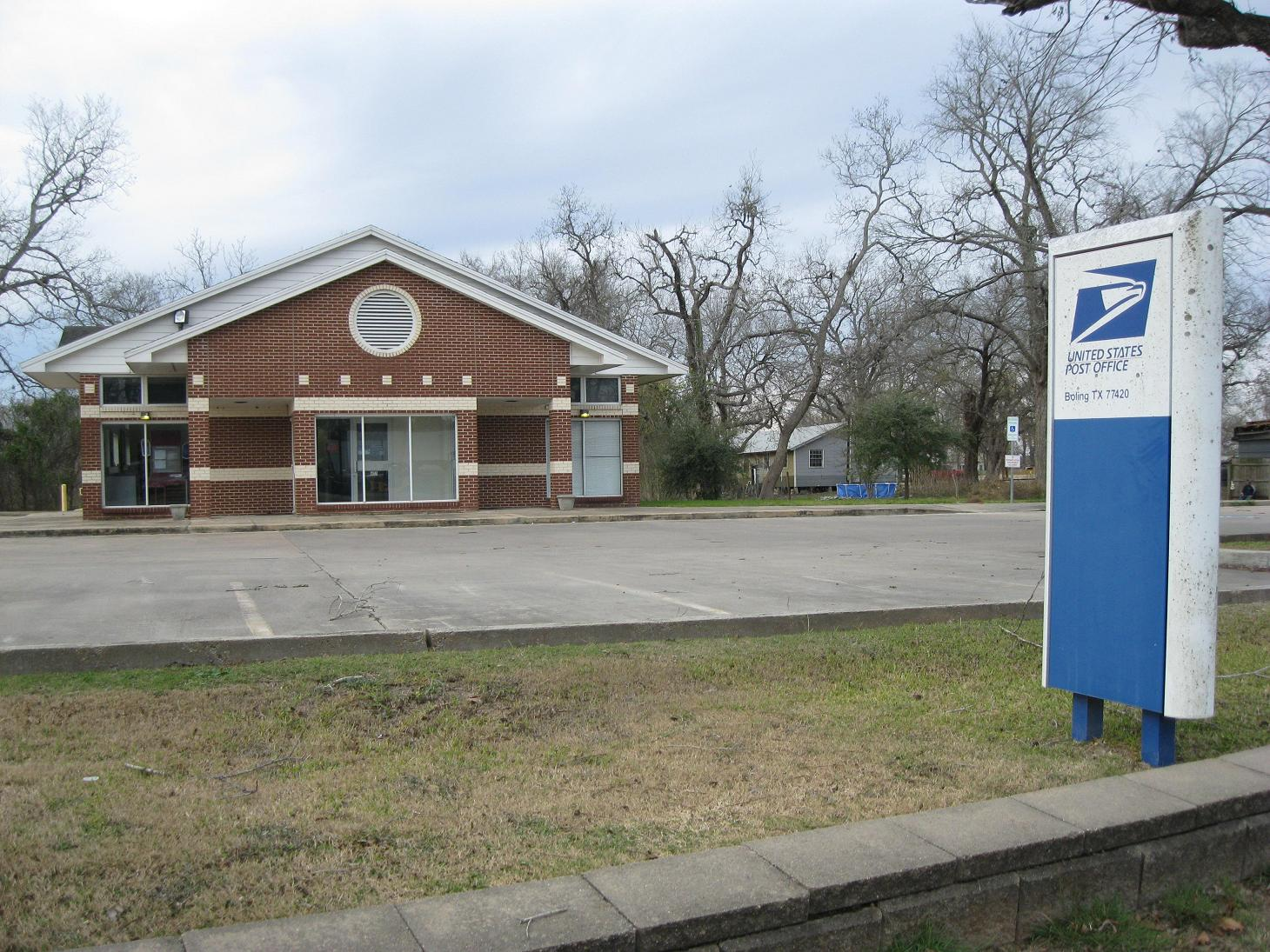
The US Postal Service changed the name from Bolling in 1926.

The first settlement in the area was known as Floyd's Lane which was on a trail that ran from a Colorado River crossing on the west to a San Bernard River crossing on the east. A trail that ran beside Caney Creek connected the area to Wharton. Boling was founded in 1900 when the New York, Texas & Mexican Railroad built a line through the area. The settlement was named for Mary Bolling Vineyard, the then-6-year-old daughter of Robert E. Vineyard who had the town surveyed. By 1907 the town had a school, a store, a blacksmith shop, and about ten families. The school had four teachers and 104 black students. These children descended from the African-American slaves who worked the area's plantations in the pre-Civil War era. Their parents were sharecroppers or hired hands on the large land tracts which survived from the earlier time.

Boling expanded in population from 20 in 1920 to 450 in 1930 after petroleum, sulphur, and natural gas were discovered locally in mid-decade. The post office opened in 1926, dropping the second L in the town's name to change it to Boling. The town's streets were named after the oil companies that operated nearby. There are still streets named Atlantic, Gulf, Humble, Magnolia, Sinclair, Sun, and Texas. The Boling Chamber of Commerce was set up in 1935. The town's population reached 800 in 1944, dipped to 521 in 1972, and increased to 1,297 in 1990. The community's economy was hard-hit in December 1993 when the sulphur plant in Newgulf closed. In 2000 Boling's population was 1,271.

== Demographics ==
Historical population
Census	Pop.	Note	%±
1980	1,348		—
1990	1,119		−17.0%
2000	1,271		13.6%
U.S. Decennial Census; 1850–1900 1910; 1920 1930 1940; 1950 1960 1970; 1980 1990 2000; 2010

Boling-Iago first appeared as a census-designated place in the 1980 United States census. The CDP was split prior to the 2010 census into two separate CDPs: Boling CDP and Iago CDP.

Boling-Iago CDP, Texas – Racial and ethnic composition Note: the US Census treats Hispanic/Latino as an ethnic category. This table excludes Latinos from the racial categories and assigns them to a separate category. Hispanics/Latinos may be of any race.
Race / Ethnicity (NH = Non-Hispanic)	Pop 2000	% 2000
White alone (NH)	550	43.27%
Black or African American alone (NH)	70	5.51%
Native American or Alaska Native alone (NH)	2	0.16%
Asian alone (NH)	0	0.00%
Pacific Islander alone (NH)	0	0.00%
Other race alone (NH)	0	0.00%
Mixed race or Multiracial (NH)	3	0.24%
Hispanic or Latino (any race)	646	50.83%
Total	1,271	100.00%

As of the census of 2000, there were 1,271 people, 434 households, and 329 families residing in the CDP.

== Geology ==
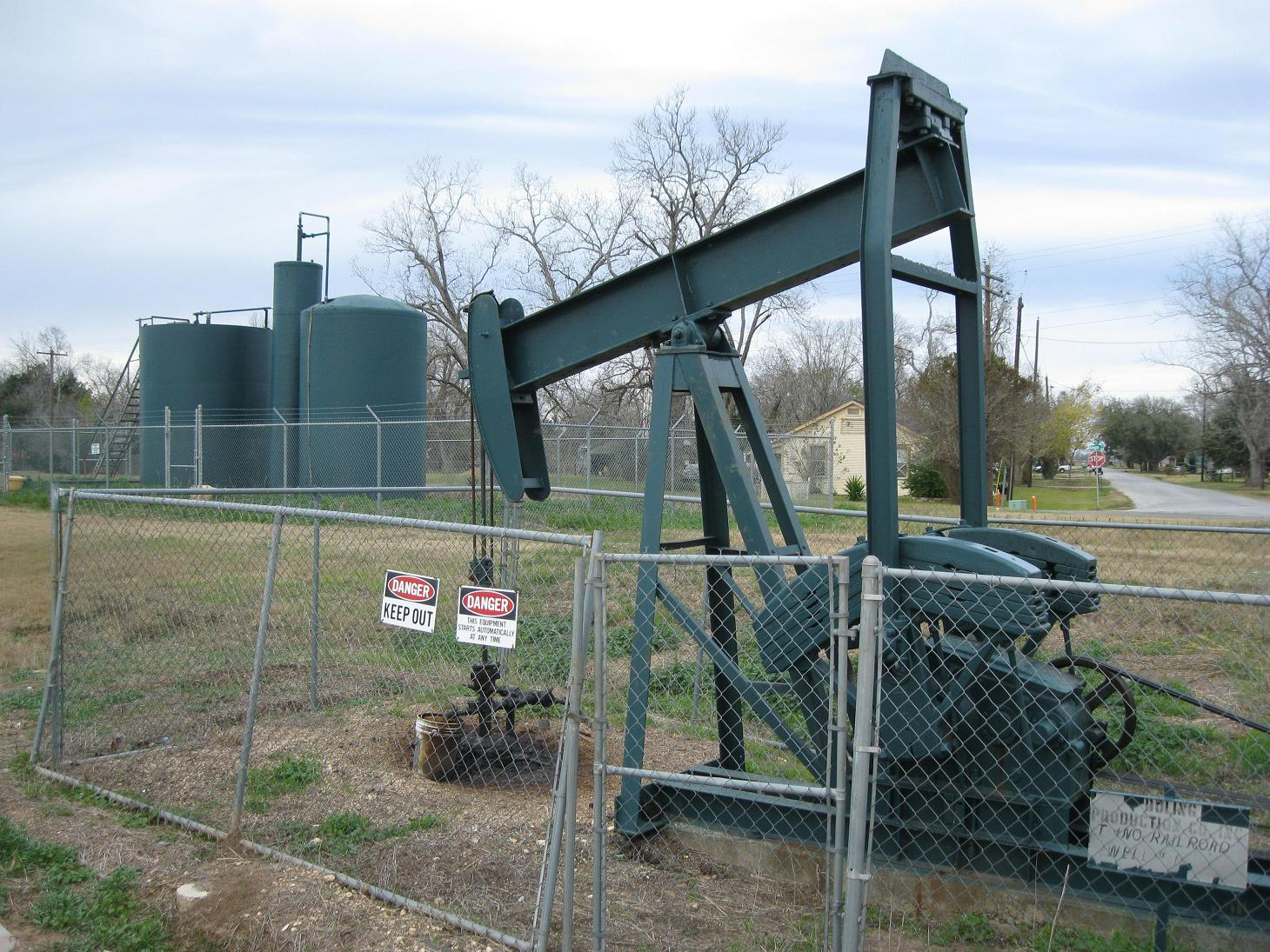
Oil pump jack was on FM 1301 in Iago in 2012.

The Boling salt dome is a major geological feature in the Boling-Iago area. The large oval-shaped structure is situated mostly between Boling and the San Bernard River to the northeast, with the longer axis running east–west. The caprock lies 383 feet (117 m) under the surface at the crest of the salt dome. Sulphur in water wells, natural gas seeps in the San Bernard River, and surface expressions indicated that the feature might be exploited for petroleum oil. In 1922 the first lease was bought and test wells were drilled. The first commercial well was the Texas Company's #3 Taylor in 1925; it produced about 10,000 barrels per day. In December 1937 there were 91 producing wells in the Boling Field, but by the end of 1946 many wells were played out and production dipped to 300,000 barrels per day.

In April 1947, new producing oil wells were drilled near Iago on the southwest edge of the Boling salt dome. Soon after, other successful wells were drilled on the north, northeast, and south flanks of the structure. Between 1947 and 1951, the field's production leaped to an average of 1 million barrels per year. At the end of 1952 there were 180 oil wells. In 1927, a sulphur-rich core sample was retrieved from the caprock and the production of sulphur began. From that year until 1952, about 38 million tons of sulphur were extracted from the Boling salt dome.

== Education ==
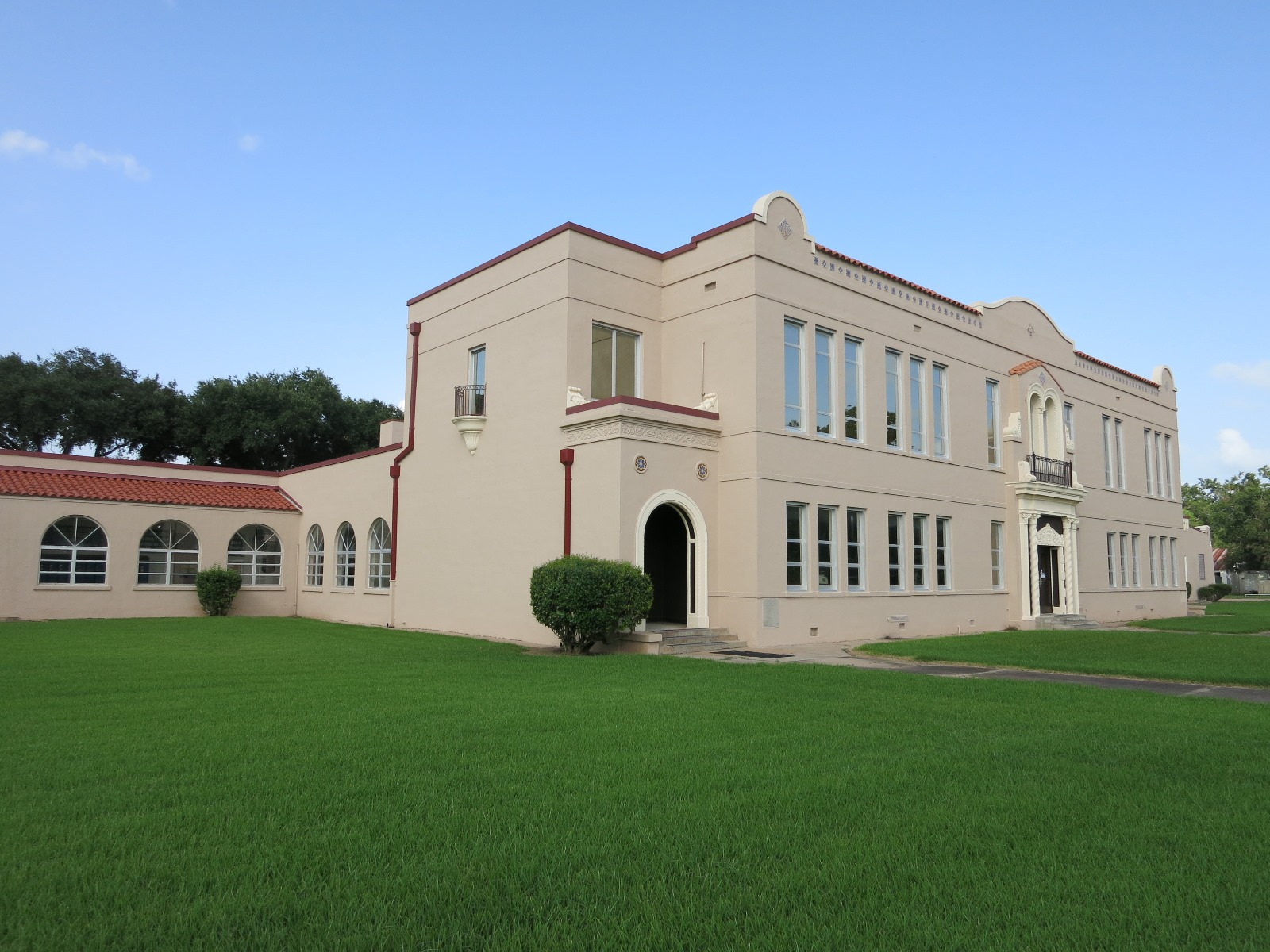
Boling High School

Boling-Iago is served by the Boling Independent School District. Its three schools are each located in a separate community. Boling High School is situated in Boling, Iago Junior High School can be found in Iago, and Newgulf Elementary School is located in Newgulf. In 1973, the district absorbed part of the Hungerford Independent School District. Boling High School's sports teams are known as the Bulldogs.

In the 2010 Adequate Yearly Progress (AYP) report by the Texas Education Agency (TEA), Boling ISD received a Recognized rating. According to TEA statistics, 49% of the school district's students were Hispanic, 41% were white, and 9% were African-American. The proportion of economically disadvantaged students was 50% and the special education program served 9% of all students. While the junior high and high schools received Recognized ratings, the elementary school earned a coveted Exemplary rating in 2010. There were approximately 500 students in district schools.

The designated community college for Boling ISD is Wharton County Junior College.

== Climate ==
The climate in this area is characterized by hot, humid summers and generally mild to cool winters. According to the Köppen Climate Classification system, Boling-Iago, Texas has a humid subtropical climate, abbreviated "Cfa" on climate maps.
