= Lindenhurst, New York =

- Village
- Incorporated Village of Lindenhurst
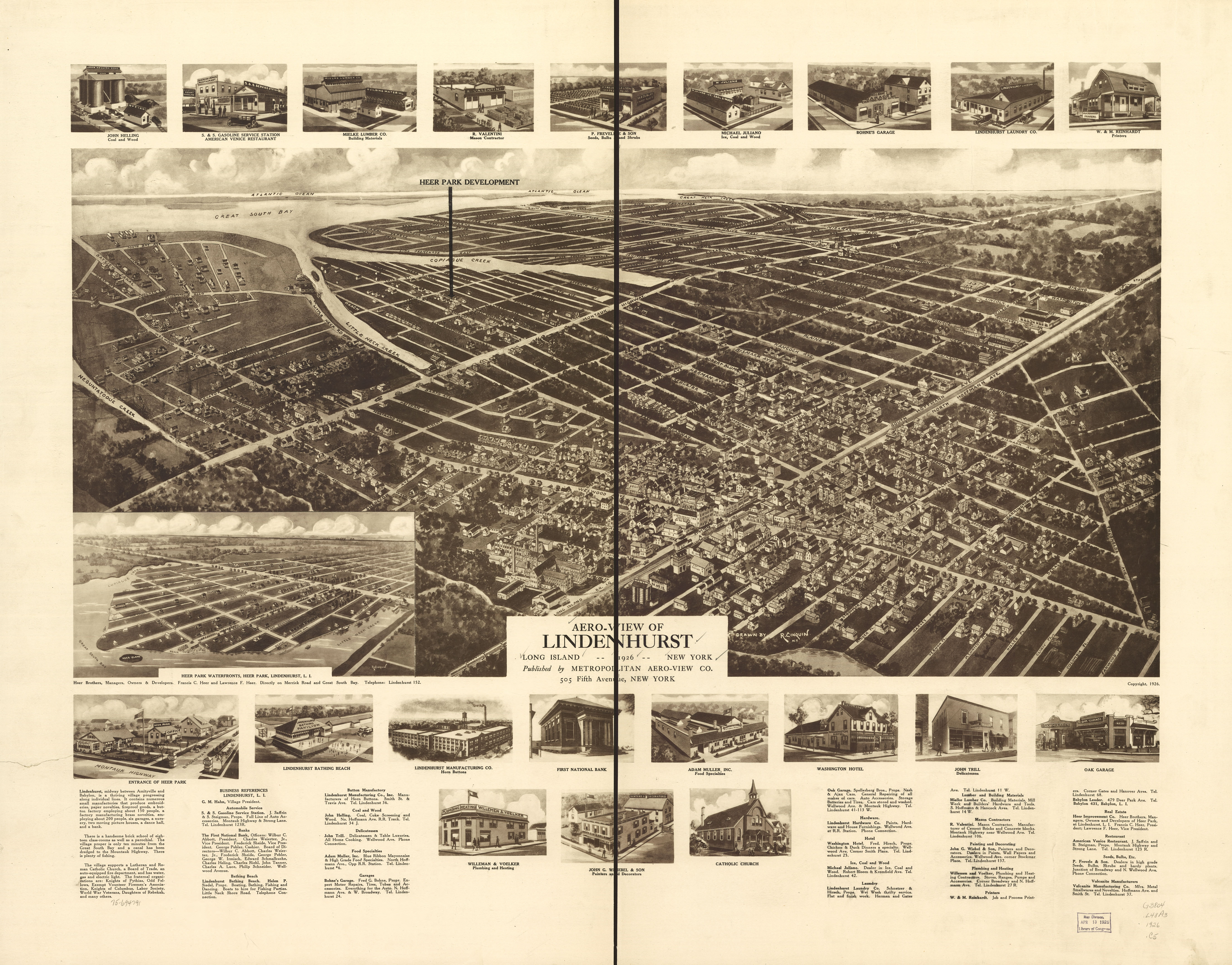
- Panoramic map of Lindenhurst from 1926 with list of landmarks and images of several inset

- Seal
- Nicknames: Lindy, The Hurst
- Motto: Lindy Pride
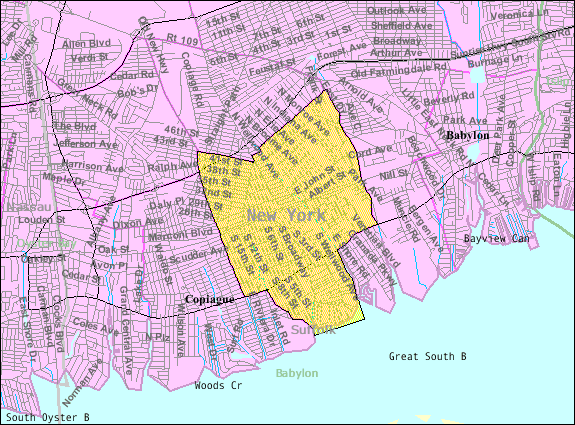
- U.S. Census map

- Location on Long Island Location within the state of New York
- Coordinates: 40°41′7″N 73°22′20″W
- Country: United States
- State: New York
- County: Suffolk
- Town: Babylon
- Incorporated: 1923

Government
  - Mayor: Michael A. Lavorata (R)

Area
  - Total: 3.81 sq mi (9.87 km^{2})
  - Land: 3.75 sq mi (9.70 km^{2})
  - Water: 0.066 sq mi (0.17 km^{2})
- Elevation: 30 ft (9 m)

Population (2020)
  - Total: 27,148
  - Density: 7,245.4/sq mi (2,797.48/km^{2})
- Time zone: UTC-5 (Eastern (EST))
  - Summer (DST): UTC-4 (EDT)
- ZIP code: 11757
- Area codes: 631, 934
- FIPS code: 36-42554
- GNIS feature ID: 0955404
- Website: www.villageoflindenhurstny.gov

Lindenhurst is a village located within the Town of Babylon in Suffolk County, on the South Shore of Long Island, in New York, United States. The population was 27,148 at the time of the 2020 census.

The village is officially known as the Incorporated Village of Lindenhurst.

== History ==
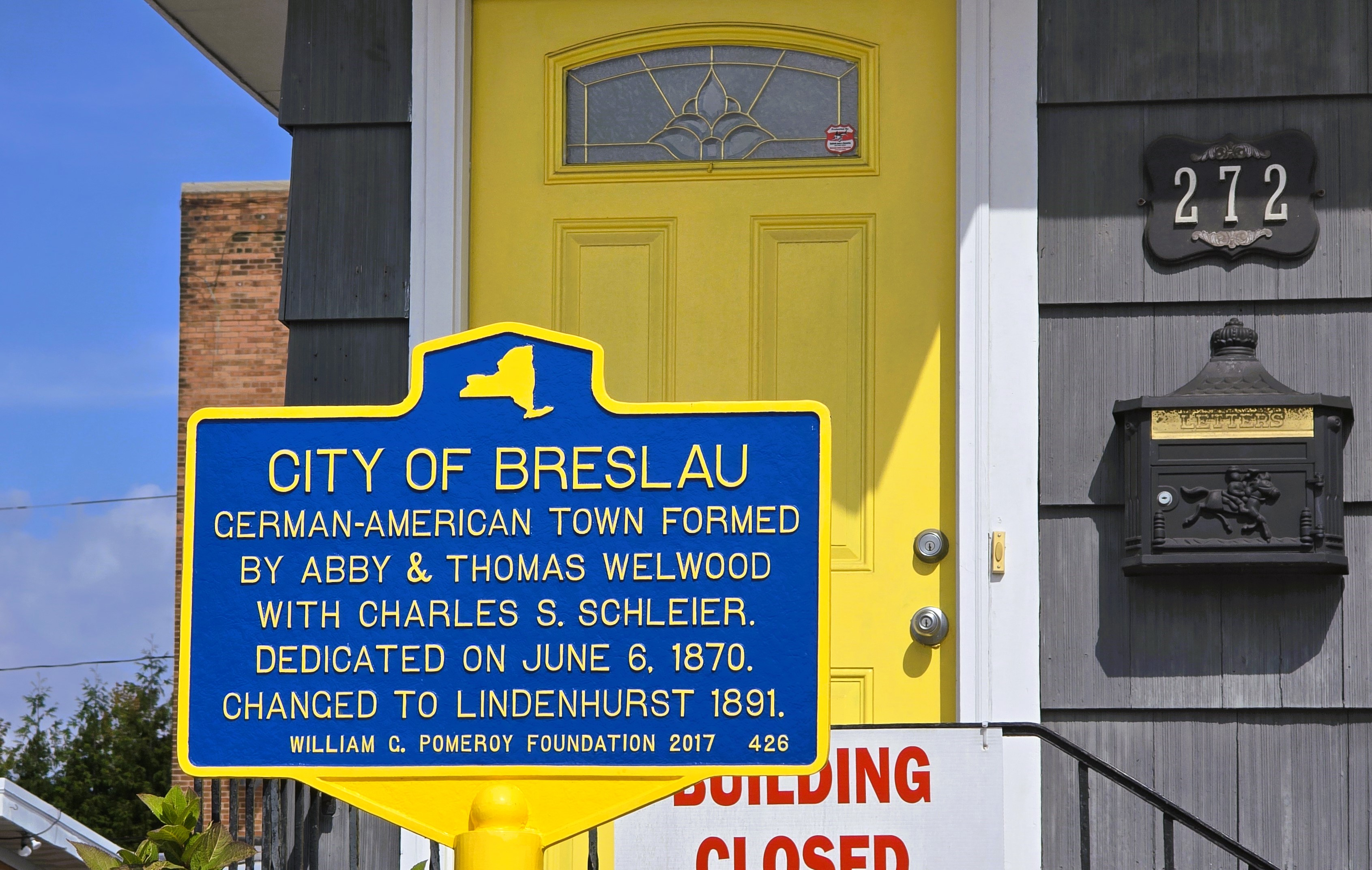
A historic marker for Breslau in 2024

The village was originally named "Breslau" because the town's original German settlers were from the city of Breslau in Silesia (present-day Wrocław, Poland.) The town was founded in 1873 and was renamed Lindenhurst in 1891.

In 1923, Lindenhurst residents voted to incorporate the community as a village.

On October 30, 2012, Hurricane Sandy flooded over half the village's streets. On the southern side of Montauk Highway the water reached up to 6 feet (1.8 m) high. When multiple fires broke out south of Montauk Highway, firefighters were able to contain these fires to their respective dwellings limiting further damage to neighboring houses. Firefighters from most of the Town of Babylon helped control the fires in Lindenhurst. Firefighters fought the blazes in water that was four feet high in higher spots and six feet in lower areas. The people who lived on the northern side of Lindenhurst had no power for over one week. Because of incidents of looting the vacated homes on the southern side of Lindenhurst, the police force had to impose limitations. Curfews were enforced, and only people with proof of residency were allowed south of Montauk Highway. After two days, the water receded.

The village celebrated its centennial in 2023.

== Geography ==
According to the United States Census Bureau, the village has a total area of 10.0 sq mi (26 km^{2}), of which 3.8 square miles (9.8 km^{2}) is land and 0.1 square miles (0.26 km^{2}) – or 1.57% – is water.

The Village of Lindenhurst is bordered by Copiague to the west, North Amityville to the northwest, North Lindenhurst to the north, West Babylon to the east, and the Great South Bay to the south.

== Demographics ==
Historical population
| Census | Pop. | Note | %± |
|---|---|---|---|
| 1930 | 4,040 | | — |
| 1940 | 4,756 | | 17.7% |
| 1950 | 8,644 | | 81.7% |
| 1960 | 20,905 | | 141.8% |
| 1970 | 28,359 | | 35.7% |
| 1980 | 26,919 | | −5.1% |
| 1990 | 26,879 | | −0.1% |
| 2000 | 27,819 | | 3.5% |
| 2010 | 27,253 | | −2.0% |
| 2020 | 27,148 | | −0.4% |
U.S. Decennial Census

=== 2020 census ===
As of the 2020 census, Lindenhurst had a population of 27,148. The median age was 41.9 years. 19.0% of residents were under the age of 18 and 15.8% of residents were 65 years of age or older. For every 100 females there were 94.2 males, and for every 100 females age 18 and over there were 92.1 males age 18 and over.

100.0% of residents lived in urban areas, while 0.0% lived in rural areas.

There were 9,260 households in Lindenhurst, of which 32.4% had children under the age of 18 living in them. Of all households, 55.0% were married-couple households, 14.6% were households with a male householder and no spouse or partner present, and 24.4% were households with a female householder and no spouse or partner present. About 19.3% of all households were made up of individuals and 9.0% had someone living alone who was 65 years of age or older.

There were 9,712 housing units, of which 4.7% were vacant. The homeowner vacancy rate was 0.9% and the rental vacancy rate was 3.5%.

Racial composition as of the 2020 census
| Race | Number | Percent |
|---|---|---|
| White | 21,413 | 78.9% |
| Black or African American | 688 | 2.5% |
| American Indian and Alaska Native | 84 | 0.3% |
| Asian | 736 | 2.7% |
| Native Hawaiian and Other Pacific Islander | 0 | 0.0% |
| Some other race | 1,950 | 7.2% |
| Two or more races | 2,277 | 8.4% |
| Hispanic or Latino (of any race) | 4,458 | 16.4% |

=== 2010 census ===
As of the 2010 United States census, there were 27,253 people and 8,638 households in the village, with 3.17 persons per household. The population density was 7,248.1 inhabitants per square mile (2,798.5/km^{2}).

There were 6,665 housing units, of which 15.1% were in multi-unit structures. The homeownership rate was 86.0%. The median value of owner-occupied housing units was $392,100. 3.6% of housing units were vacant and 20.7% of occupied housing units were occupied by renters.

The racial makeup of the village was 86.5% White, 3.3% African American, 0.1% Native American, 1.8% Asian, 0.0% Pacific Islander, 0.0% from other races, and 2.6% from two or more races. Hispanic or Latino people of any race were 18.1% of the population. The village was 82.9% non-Hispanic White.

There were 8,638 households, out of which 37.6% had children under the age of 18 living with them, 26.5% had individuals over the age of 65, 58.2% were married couples living together, 12.2% had a female householder with no husband present, and 24.4% were non-families. 19.3% of all households were made up of individuals, and 8.1% had someone living alone who was 65 years of age or older. The average household size was 2.92 and the average family size was 3.35.

In the village, the population was spread out, with 5.0% under the age of 5, 22.5% under the age of 18, 6.3% from 20 to 24, 26.1% from 25 to 44, 30.2% from 45 to 64, and 12.1% who were 65 years of age or older. The median age was 40.3 years.

95.2% of the population had lived in the same house one year and over. 13.0% of the entire population were foreign born and 16.1% of residents at least 5 years old spoke a language other than English at home.

88.3% of residents at least 25 years old had graduated from high school, and 21.2% of residents at least 25 years old had a bachelor's degree or higher. The mean travel time to work for workers aged 16 and over was 31.2 minutes.

The median income for a household in the village was $85,345. The per capita income for the village was $31,275. 2.9% of the population were below the poverty line.

== Education ==
All of the Village of Lindenhurst is served by the Lindenhurst Union Free School District, which also serves most of North Lindenhurst and a small part of West Babylon.

As of the 2010–2011 school year, the Lindenhurst Union Free School District had 6,760 students. The racial demographics were 0% Native American or Alaska Native, 3% non-Hispanic black or African-American, 14% Hispanic or Latino, 80% non-Hispanic white, 3% Asian or Native Hawaiian/other Pacific Islander and 0% multiracial. 11% of students were eligible for free lunch, 5% for reduced-price lunch, and 4% of students were limited English proficient.

The school district had a graduation rate of 91%, and 1% of students did not complete school. 93% of graduates received a Regents Diploma and 54% received a Regents Diploma with Advanced Designation. Of the 2011 completers, 49% planned to move on to a four-year college, 29% to a two-year college, 0% to other post-secondary schooling, 1% to the military, 8% to employment, 2% to adult services, 0% had other known post-secondary plans, and 11% had no known post-secondary plan.

The district currently has:

Six elementary schools (grades K-5)
(name) - (number of students) - (spot in Lindenhurst)

- Albany Avenue - 470 students - North West
- Alleghany Avenue - 300 students - South East
- Daniel Street - 507 students - North East
- Harding Avenue - 295 students - South South
- West Gates Avenue - 321 students - South West
- William Rall - 518 students - North North

One middle school (grades 6–8)

- Lindenhurst Middle School

One high school (grades 9–12)

- Lindenhurst Senior High School

For the 2011–2012 school year, the Accountability Status for all seven original elementary schools and the high school was "In Good Standing", while the middle school was "In Need of Improvement (Year 1) Basic". The overall Accountability Status for the district was "In Good Standing".

Edward W. Bower Elementary School ceased operating after the 2010–2011 school year due to the old age of the building and its low student population. Although Harding Avenue's student population was even lower at the time, its building is much newer. Although Bower has ceased operations as an elementary school, it now houses the Lindenhurst Academy.

== Transportation ==
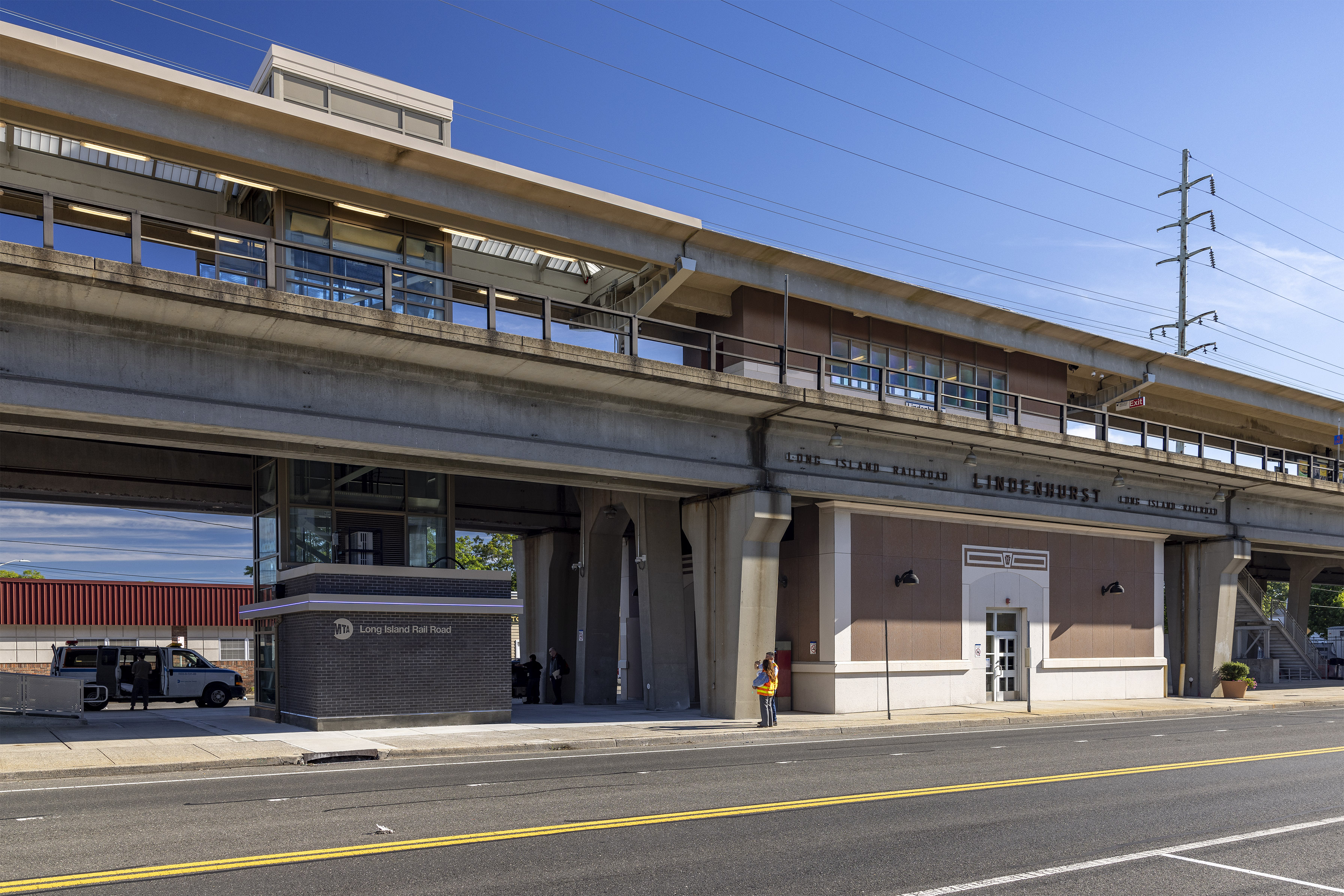
The Lindenhurst LIRR station in 2024

The Lindenhurst train station runs along the Babylon Branch of the Long Island Rail Road.

Bus service in Lindenhurst is also provided by Suffolk County Transit via bus routes 2 (Amityville LIRR to Patchogue LIRR via Merrick Road/Montauk Highway) and 10 (Amityville LIRR to Babylon LIRR).

== Notable people ==
- Jack Barry, game show host; grew up in Lindenhurst; valedictorian at Lindenhurst High School
- Lenny Montana, Colombo Family enforcer and actor best known for his portrayal of Luca Brasi in The Godfather
- Joy Behar, co-host of The View; once a teacher at Lindenhurst High School
- Pat Benatar, rock and roll hall of fame singer; grew up in Lindenhurst and attended Lindenhurst Senior High School
- Teddy Castellucci, session musician and film composer with over 45 major motion pictures to his credit, many with Adam Sandler; grew up in Lindenhurst, graduated from Lindenhurst High School.
- Hal Hartley, film director; a Lindenhurst native
- Ryan LaFlare, professional MMA fighter, UFC Welterweight division; born and raised in Lindenhurst
- Dan Lauria, actor, The Wonder Years; resided in Lindenhurst
- Joe Lhota, former New York City Deputy Mayor, MTA chairman and Republican mayoral candidate; born in the Bronx and grew up in Lindenhurst
- Sal LoCascio, Hall of Fame Lacrosse goaltender and coach; attended Lindenhurst Senior High School
- Eileen Moran, visual effects producer at Weta Digital and Digital Domain, co-producer of The Hobbit: An Unexpected Journey
- Linda Morand, international model; born in Lindenhurst
- Doug Murray, co-creator and writer of the Marvel Comics series The 'Nam.
- Rockets Redglare (1949–2001), character actor and stand-up comedian
- Jeremy Ruckert, Tight End, New York Jets
- Frederick Sheide (1876–1944), member of the New York State Assembly

== See also ==
- List of villages in New York (state)
- Lindenhurst Memorial Library
