= 2026 Tarleton State Texans baseball team =

American college baseball season

2026 Tarleton State Texans baseball

WAC regular season and tournament champions

Austin Regional, 1–2
- Conference: Western Athletic Conference
- Record: 38–21 (12–6 WAC)
- Head coach: Fuller Smith (3rd season)
- Home stadium: Cecil Ballow Baseball Complex

2026 Western Athletic Conference baseball standings
	Conf.				Overall
Team	W		L	PCT	W		L	PCT
Tarleton ‍†‍‡‍^{y}	12	–	6	.667	34	–	19	.642
California Baptist ‍‍‍	11	–	7	.611	43	–	13	.768
Utah Tech ‍‍‍	10	–	8	.556	31	–	21	.596
Sacramento State ‍‍‍	10	–	8	.556	26	–	30	.464
Abilene Christian ‍‍‍	8	–	10	.444	25	–	29	.463
UT Arlington ‍‍‍	8	–	10	.444	19	–	30	.388
Utah Valley ‍‍‍	4	–	14	.222	15	–	35	.300
† – Conference champion ‡ – Tournament champion y – Invited to the NCAA Tournament; As of May 17, 2026; Rankings from D1Baseball

The 2026 Tarleton State Texans baseball team represents Tarleton State University during the 2026 NCAA Division I baseball season. The Texans play their home games at the Cecil Ballow Baseball Complex as a member of the Western Athletic Conference. They are be led by third-year head coach Fuller Smith.

== Preseason ==
=== Coaches poll ===
The coaches poll was released on February 5, 2026. Tarleton State was selected to finish fifth in the conference.

WAC coaches poll
Predicted finish	Team	Votes (1st place)
1	Abilene Christian	33 (3)
2	Utah Valley	29 (1)
3	Cal Baptist	27
4	Sacramento State	22
5	Tarleton State	15
6	Utah Tech	11
7	UT Arlington	10

=== Awards and honors ===
==== Preseason WAC awards and honors ====
Preseason All-WAC Team
Player	No.	Position	Class
Sergio Guerra	11	C	Senior
Rayner Heinrich	8	OF	Sophomore

== Personnel ==
=== Starters ===
Lineup
Pos.	No.	Player.	Year
C	11	Sergio Guerra	Senior
1B	13	Cage McCloud	Sophomore
2B	17	Slade McCloud	Senior
3B	4	Brady Englett	Junior
SS	2	Ike Shirey	Senior
LF	8	Rayner Heinrich	Sophomore
CF	3	Kendyl Johnson	Sophomore
RF	5	Jake Tatom	Senior
DH	6	Carson Lorch	Senior

Weekend pitching rotation
Day	No.	Player.	Year
Friday	28	Cort Lowry	Sophomore
Saturday	34	Ethan Wendel	Junior
Sunday	39	Brendon Carter	Senior

=== Roster ===
2026 Tarleton State Texans baseball team
Players
Coaches

#	Pos.	Name	B/T	Height	Weight	Year	Home town
2	INF	Ike Shirey	R/R	5 ft 10 in (1.78 m)	170 lb (77 kg)	Sr	Dale, OK
3	OF	Kendyl Johnson	L/L	5 ft 9 in (1.75 m)	170 lb (77 kg)	So	Little Elm, TX
4	C	Brady Englett	R/R	5 ft 9 in (1.75 m)	190 lb (86 kg)	Jr	Katy, TX
5	OF	Jake Tatom	R/R	6 ft 1 in (1.85 m)	185 lb (84 kg)	Sr	Kingwood, TX
6	INF	Carson Lorch	R/R	5 ft 9 in (1.75 m)	180 lb (82 kg)	Sr	Cypress, TX
7	LHP	Karsen Davis	L/L	6 ft 1 in (1.85 m)	180 lb (82 kg)	So	Grand Prairie, TX
8	UTL	Rayner Heinrich	R/R	5 ft 9 in (1.75 m)	185 lb (84 kg)	So	Georgetown, TX
10	UTL	Matt Guthmiller	L/L	6 ft 0 in (1.83 m)	210 lb (95 kg)	Sr	Omaha, NE
11	C	Sergio Guerra	R/R	6 ft 0 in (1.83 m)	215 lb (98 kg)	Sr	San Diego, TX
12	INF	Raphaël Smeenk	S/R	6 ft 2 in (1.88 m)	195 lb (88 kg)	RS Jr	Amsterdam, NED
13	INF	Cage McCloud	L/R	6 ft 1 in (1.85 m)	195 lb (88 kg)	So	China Spring, TX
14	UTL	Chris Ricard	R/R	6 ft 3 in (1.91 m)	230 lb (104 kg)	Jr	Lewiston, ID
15	C	Mason Kirk	R/R	6 ft 1 in (1.85 m)	195 lb (88 kg)	So	China Spring, TX
16	LHP	Jackson Elizondo	R/L	5 ft 11 in (1.8 m)	210 lb (95 kg)	So	Spring Branch, TX
17	INF	Slade McCloud	L/R	6 ft 0 in (1.83 m)	195 lb (88 kg)	Sr	Robinson, TX
18	RHP	Tai Phetluangsy	L/R	5 ft 11 in (1.8 m)	170 lb (77 kg)	Sr	Amarillo, TX
20	OF	Braden Gostisha	L/R	6 ft 3 in (1.91 m)	195 lb (88 kg)	Sr	Round Rock, TX
21	RHP	Brian Panneton	R/R	6 ft 1 in (1.85 m)	215 lb (98 kg)	Sr	Tomball, TX
23	LHP	Cullen Kickhoefer	L/L	6 ft 2 in (1.88 m)	200 lb (91 kg)	Fr	Glen Rose, TX
24	RHP	Aden Lucas	R/R	6 ft 0 in (1.83 m)	195 lb (88 kg)	Sr	Conroe, TX
25	RHP	Daniel Bass	R/R	6 ft 4 in (1.93 m)	200 lb (91 kg)	Sr	Melissa, TX
27	RHP	Ethan Jaques	R/R	6 ft 3 in (1.91 m)	185 lb (84 kg)	Sr	Aledo, TX
28	RHP	Cort Lowry	R/R	6 ft 3 in (1.91 m)	205 lb (93 kg)	So	Franklin, TX
29	RHP	Conner Doucet	R/R	6 ft 3 in (1.91 m)	225 lb (102 kg)	Sr	The Woodlands, TX
30	LHP	Ashton Bassett	L/L	6 ft 0 in (1.83 m)	190 lb (86 kg)	So	Magnolia, TX
31	RHP	Anthony Treto	R/R	6 ft 2 in (1.88 m)	200 lb (91 kg)	Jr	Fort Lupton, CO
32	RHP	Corbin Walter	R/R	6 ft 5 in (1.96 m)	230 lb (104 kg)	Fr	League City, TX
33	RHP	Kasey Swan	R/R	6 ft 1 in (1.85 m)	165 lb (75 kg)	So	Jacksboro, TX
34	RHP	Ethan Wendel	R/R	6 ft 9 in (2.06 m)	240 lb (109 kg)	Jr	Louise, TX
35	RHP	Andrew Hardin	R/R	6 ft 1 in (1.85 m)	200 lb (91 kg)	Sr	Round Rock, TX
36	RHP	Ben Bosse	R/R	6 ft 1 in (1.85 m)	195 lb (88 kg)	Sr	Brenham, TX
37	LHP	Carter Coffin	R/L	6 ft 2 in (1.88 m)	170 lb (77 kg)	Sr	Pflugerville, TX
38	OF	Tyson Drake	L/L	5 ft 11 in (1.8 m)	195 lb (88 kg)	Sr	Keller, TX
39	RHP	Brendon Carter	R/R	6 ft 2 in (1.88 m)	220 lb (100 kg)	Sr	Edmond, OK
40	RHP	Matthew McCullough	R/R	6 ft 8 in (2.03 m)	245 lb (111 kg)	Fr	Pottsboro, TX
43	RHP	Jack Lovin	R/R	6 ft 1 in (1.85 m)	205 lb (93 kg)	Fr	Flower Mound, TX

Head coach

(9) Fuller Smith

Assistant coach(es)

(44) R.D. Spiehs
(1) Will Fox
(22) Dustin Williams

Legend

- (C) Team captain
- (S) Suspended
- (I) Ineligible
- Injured
- Current redshirt

Roster
Last update: January 3, 2026

=== Coaching staff ===
2026 Tarleton State Texans baseball coaching staff
Name	Position	Seasons at Tarleton	Alma mater
Fuller Smith	Head coach	3	University of Mississippi (2009)
R.D. Spiehs	Associate coach	3	University of Nebraska–Lincoln (2002)
Will Fox	Assistant coach	1	McNeese State University (2017)
Dustin Williams	Assistant coach	2	Oklahoma State University (2017)

== Game log ==
2026 Tarleton State Texans baseball game log
(Overall: 38–21; Conference: 12–6); (Home: 19–8; Away: 14–9; Neutral: 5–4)
Regular season (35–21)
February (6–4)
(Home: 5–2; Away: 0–0; Neutral: 1–2)

Date	Time (CST)	Opponent	Rank	TV	Venue	Score	Win	Loss	Save	Attendance	Record	WAC
February 13	3:00 p.m.	Le Moyne*		WACtv	Cecil Ballow Baseball Complex; Stephenville, TX	**W** 20–3^{(7)}	**Panneton** (1–0)	Petraitis (0–1)	—	467	1–0	—
February 14	6:00 p.m.	Le Moyne*		WACtv	Cecil Ballow Baseball Complex	**W** 5–4	**Jaques** (1–0)	Earle (0–1)	**Phetluangsy** (1)	403	2–0	—
February 15	1:00 p.m.	Le Moyne*		WACtv	Cecil Ballow Baseball Complex	**W** 13–8	**Wendel** (1–0)	Skermont (0–1)	**Hardin** (1)	702	3–0	—
February 16	2:00 p.m.	vs. No. 7 Arkansas*			Globe Life Field; Arlington, TX	**L** 1–3	McElvain (1–0)	**Bass** (0–1)	Brissey (1)	1,258	3–1	—
February 20	3:00 p.m.	South Dakota State*		WACtv	Cecil Ballow Baseball Complex	**W** 9–2	**Karsen** (1–0)	Madison (0–2)	—	387	4–1	—
February 21	3:00 p.m.	South Dakota State*		WACtv	Cecil Ballow Baseball Complex	**L** 2–6	Novotny (1–1)	**Bassett** (0–1)	Augedahl (1)	327	4–2	—
February 22	12:00 p.m.	South Dakota State*		ESPN+	Cecil Ballow Baseball Complex	**L** 1–5	Schlecht (1–1)	**Lowry** (0–1)	—	290	4–3	—
February 24	2:00 p.m.	Incarnate Word*		ESPN+	Cecil Ballow Baseball Complex	**W** 17–5^{(7)}	**Treto** (1–0)	McKay (1–1)	**Doucet** (1)	280	5–3	—
Cleburne College Baseball Series
February 27	2:00 p.m.	vs. Creighton*			La Moderna Field; Cleburne, TX	**W** 8–7	**Phetluangsy** (1–0)	Goldenbau (0–1)	—	877	6–3	—
February 28	6:00 p.m.	vs. Texas State*			La Moderna Field	**L** 3–9	Moore (1–0)	**Lowry** (0–1)	Connell (1)	922	6–4	—

March (11–9)
(Home: 6–3; Away: 4–5; Neutral: 1–1)

Date	Time (CDT)	Opponent	Rank	TV	Venue	Score	Win	Loss	Save	Attendance	Record	WAC
Cleburne College Baseball Series
March 1	11:00 a.m.	vs. Creighton*			La Moderna Field	**L** 4–5					6–5	—
March 3	6:00 p.m.	Baylor*		ESPN+	Cecil Ballow Baseball Complex	**W** 6–5					7–5	—
March 6	3:00 p.m.	at New Mexico*		MWN	Santa Ana Star Field; Albuquerque, NM	**W** 13–11					8–5	—
March 7	1:00 p.m.	at New Mexico*		MWN	Santa Ana Star Field	**W** 7–3					9–5	—
March 7	4:00 p.m.	at New Mexico*		MWN	Santa Ana Star Field	**W** 15–10					10–5	—
March 8	1:00 p.m.	at New Mexico*		MWN	Santa Ana Star Field	**W** 9–7					11–5	—
March 13	6:00 p.m.	Houston Christian*		ESPN+	Cecil Ballow Baseball Complex	**L** 6–7					11–6	—
March 14	3:00 p.m.	Houston Christian*		ESPN+	Cecil Ballow Baseball Complex	**W** 8–5					12–6	—
March 15	12:00 p.m.	Houston Christian*		ESPN+	Cecil Ballow Baseball Complex	**L** 5–9					12–7	—
March 17	6:30 p.m.	at No. 2 Texas*		SECN+	UFCU Disch–Falk Field; Austin, TX	**W** 6–1					13–7	—
March 20	6:00 p.m.	at Stephen F. Austin*		ESPN+	Jaycees Field; Nacogdoches, TX	**W** 9–8					14–7	—
March 21	6:00 p.m.	at Stephen F. Austin*			Jaycees Field	**W** 7–6					15–7	—
March 22	1:00 p.m.	at Stephen F. Austin*		ESPN+	Jaycees Field	**W** 3–1					16–7	—
March 24	6:00 p.m.	at Lamar*		ESPN+	Vincent–Beck Stadium; Beaumont, TX	**L** 3–5					16–8	—
March 27	6:00 p.m.	Air Force*		ESPN+	Cecil Ballow Baseball Complex	**W** 7–2					17–8	—
March 28	3:00 p.m.	Air Force*		ESPN+	Cecil Ballow Baseball Complex	**W** 7–6					18–8	—
March 29	12:00 p.m.	Air Force*		ESPN+	Cecil Ballow Baseball Complex	**W** 11–10					19–8	—
March 31	6:30 p.m.	at Baylor*		ESPN+	Baylor Ballpark; Waco, TX	**W** 5–1					20–8	—

April (11–4)
(Home; 6–2; Away: 5–2)

Date	Time (CDT)	Opponent	Rank	TV	Venue	Score	Win	Loss	Save	Attendance	Overall record	WAC record
April 2		UT Arlington			Arlington, TX (Clay Gould Ballpark)	**W** 3-1					21–8	1–0
April 3		UT Arlington			Arlington, TX (Clay Gould Ballpark)	**L** 3-6					21–9	1–1
April 4		UT Arlington			Arlington, TX (Clay Gould Ballpark)	**L** 2-8					21–10	1–2
April 7		UTSA*			Stephenville, TX (Tarleton State Baseball Complex)	L 2-6					21–11	—
April 9		Abilene Christian			Stephenville, TX (Tarleton State Baseball Complex)	W 10-5					22–11	2–2
April 10		Abilene Christian			Cecil Ballow Baseball Complex	L 4-11					22–12	2–3
April 11		Abilene Christian			Cecil Ballow Baseball Complex	W 10-9					23–12	3–3
April 14		at TCU*			Fort Worth, TX (Lupton Stadium)	L 5-12					23–13	—
April 17		Cal Baptist			Stephenville, TX (Tarleton State Baseball Complex)	L 1-12					23–14	3–4
April 18		Cal Baptist			Stephenville, TX (Tarleton State Baseball Complex)	W 3-2					24–14	4–4
April 19		Cal Baptist			Stephenville, TX (Tarleton State Baseball Complex)	W 7-6					25–14	5–4
April 21		at Texas Tech*			Lubbock, TX (Dan Law Field at Rip Griffin Park)	L 3-13					25–15	—
April 24		Utah Valley			Stephenville, TX (Tarleton State Baseball Complex)	W 12-2					26–15	6–4
April 25		Utah Valley			Stephenville, TX (Tarleton State Baseball Complex)	W 8-2					27–15	7–4
April 26		Utah Valley			Stephenville, TX (Tarleton State Baseball Complex)	W 13-9					28–15	8–4
April 28		at Texas A&M*			Bryan-College Station, TX (Blue Bell Park)	L 7-9					28–16	—

May (6–5)
(Home; 3–1; Away: 3–4)

Date	Time (CDT)	Opponent	Rank	TV	Venue	Score	Win	Loss	Save	Attendance	Overall record	WAC record
May 1 (Fri)		Utah Tech		St. George, UT (Bruce Hurst Field)	W 9-6					29–16		
May 2 (Sat)		Utah Tech		St. George, UT (Bruce Hurst Field)	W 8-4					30–16		
May 3 (Sun)		Utah Tech		St. George, UT (Bruce Hurst Field)	W 10-8					31–16		
May 8 (Fri)		UTRGV		Stephenville, TX (Tarleton State Baseball Complex)	W 7-4					32–16		
May 9 (Sat)		UTRGV		Stephenville, TX (Tarleton State Baseball Complex)	W 10-8					33–16		
May 10 (Sun)		UTRGV		Stephenville, TX (Tarleton State Baseball Complex)	L 2-4					33–17		
May 14 (Thu)		Sacramento State		Sacramento, CA (John Smith Field)	L 5-8					33–18		
May 15 (Fri)		Sacramento State		Sacramento, CA (John Smith Field)	W 15-4					34–18		
May 16 (Sat)		Sacramento State		Sacramento, CA (John Smith Field)	L 4-8					34–19		

Postseason (4–2)
WAC tournament (3–0)

Date	Time (CDT)	Opponent	Rank	TV	Venue	Score	Win	Loss	Save	Attendance	Record	WACT record
May 21 (Thu)		Sacramento State		Mesa, AZ (Hohokam Stadium)	W 9-0					35–19		
May 22 (Fri)		California Baptist		Mesa, AZ (Hohokam Stadium)	W 5-3					36–19		
May 23 (Sat)		Sacramento State		Mesa, AZ (Hohokam Stadium)	W 21-11					37–19		

NCAA Austin Regional (1–2)

Date	Time (CDT)	Opponent	Rank	TV	Venue	Score	Win	Loss	Save	Attendance	Record	NCAAT record
May 29 (Fri)		UC Santa Barbara		Austin, TX (UFCU Disch-Falk Field)	W 11-5					38–19		
May 30 (Sat)		Texas		Austin, TX (UFCU Disch-Falk Field)	L 2-16					38–20		
May 31 (Sun)		UC Santa Barbara		Austin, TX (UFCU Disch-Falk Field)	L 5-9					38–21		

"#" represents ranking. All rankings from D1Baseball Poll on the date of the contest.
"()" represents postseason seeding in the WAC Tournament or NCAA Regional, respectively.
= Win, = Loss, = Canceled/Postponed
Bold = **Tarleton State Texans team member**
* = Non-Conference Game
Schedule Source:

Schedule Notes:
