= Gary Adcock =

American basketball coach

Current position
- Title: Head coach
- Team: California Baptist
- Conference: Big West
- Record: 522–285

Biographical details
- Born: Riverside, California, U.S.

Playing career
- 1990: UC Santa Barbara
- 1991: Riverside City College
- 1992–1993: UCLA
- Position: Pitcher

Coaching career (HC unless noted)
- 1994: UCLA (GA)
- 1996: California Baptist (asst)
- 1997–1998: Riverside City College (asst)
- 1999–2000: Purdue (asst)
- 2001–2003: UCLA (asst)
- 2004–present: California Baptist

Head coaching record
- Overall: 522–285 (NCAA); 281–150–1 (NAIA)
- Tournaments: NCAA: 0–0

Accomplishments and honors

Championships
- 3x GSAC Regular Season (2006,10-11); 3x PacWest Regular Season (2012-13,16); 2× WAC (2019, 2021)

Gary Adcock is an American college baseball coach and former pitcher. Adcock is the head coach of the California Baptist Lancers baseball team.

== Playing career ==
Upon graduation from high school, Adcock enrolled at University of California, Santa Barbara. Adcock pitched 7 complete games for the Gauchos in 1990. The following year, he transferred to Riverside City College.

In 1992, his junior year, he transferred to UCLA and he pitched a 6–6 record with a 6.56 ERA. He returned for his senior season at UCLA, pitching to a 3–4 record, and a 5.75 ERA.

== Coaching career ==
Adcock joined the UCLA staff as a graduate assistant during the 1994 season. He then accepted an assistant coaching role at California Baptist University. In 1997 and 1998, he served as the pitching coach for Riverside City College. Adcock then accepted the pitching coach job at Purdue University. He helped the Boilermakers to a Big Ten Conference leading 4.12 ERA in 2000. On August 18, 2000, he returned to UCLA as a pitching coach.

In 2003, Adcock was named the head coach at California Baptist. He led the Lancers to the 2010 NAIA World Series.

== Head coaching record ==
Record table
| Season | Team | Overall | Conference | Standing | Postseason |
|---|---|---|---|---|---|
California Baptist Lancers (Golden State Athletic Conference) (2004–2011)
| 2004 | California Baptist | 30–22 | 18–10 | 3rd | Region II Tournament |
| 2005 | California Baptist | 24–25–1 | 18–12 | 2nd (Southern) | Region II Tournament |
| 2006 | California Baptist | 43–9 | 27–5 | 1st | Region II Tournament |
| 2007 | California Baptist | 35–18 | 23–13 | T-2nd | Region II Tournament |
| 2008 | California Baptist | 30–22 | 19–17 | 5th | Region II Tournament |
| 2009 | California Baptist | 27–23 | 16–20 | 6th | |
| 2010 | California Baptist | 49–15 | 30–6 | 1st | NAIA World Series |
| 2011 | California Baptist | 43–16 | 26–10 | 1st | NAIA Opening Round |
| California Baptist: | | 281–150–1 (NAIA) | 177–93 | | |
California Baptist Lancers (Pacific West Conference) (2012–2018)
| 2012 | California Baptist | 43–13 | 31–9 | 1st | |
| 2013 | California Baptist | 43–18 | 26–10 | 1st | |
| 2014 | California Baptist | 39–15 | 22–12 | 2nd | NCAA Regional |
| 2015 | California Baptist | 31–22 | 22–10 | 2nd | NCAA Regional |
| 2016 | California Baptist | 42–13 | 29–7 | 1st | NCAA Regional |
| 2017 | California Baptist | 32–24 | 14–10 | 3rd | NCAA Regional |
| 2018 | California Baptist | 35–19 | 26–14 | 3rd | NCAA Regional |
| California Baptist: | | | 170–72 | | |
California Baptist Lancers (Western Athletic Conference) (2019–2026)
| 2019 | California Baptist | 35–20 | 19–8 | T-1st | ineligible |
| 2020 | California Baptist | 7–8 | 0–0 | | Season canceled due to COVID-19 |
| 2021 | California Baptist | 40–16 | 29–7 | T-1st | ineligible |
| 2022 | California Baptist | 36–20 | 18–12 | 2nd (West) | |
| 2023 | California Baptist | 28–30 | 15–15 | 8th | |
| 2024 | California Baptist | 37–25 | 18–12 | 4th | WAC Tournament |
| 2025 | California Baptist | 30–27 | 12–12 | 5th | WAC Tournament |
| 2026 | California Baptist | 44–15 | 11–7 | 2nd | WAC Tournament |
| California Baptist: | | 522–285 | 122–73 | | |
| Total: | | 522–285 | | | |
National champion Postseason invitational champion Conference regular season champion Conference regular season and conference tournament champion Division regular season champion Division regular season and conference tournament champion Conference tournament champion

== See also ==
- List of current NCAA Division I baseball coaches
