= Greg Brezina =

American football player (born 1946)

- Brezina in 1972

No. 50
- Position: Linebacker

Personal information
- Born: January 7, 1946 (age 80); Sinton, Texas, U.S.
- Listed height: 6 ft 0 in (1.83 m)
- Listed weight: 226 lb (103 kg)

Career information
- High school: Louise (TX)
- College: Houston
- NFL draft: 1968: 11th round, 275th overall pick

Career history
- Atlanta Falcons (1968–1979)

Awards and highlights
- Pro Bowl (1969)

Career NFL statistics
- Fumble recoveries: 14
- Interceptions: 12
- Sacks: 26
- Stats at Pro Football Reference

Gregory Brezina (born January 7, 1946) is an American former professional football player who was a linebacker for twelve seasons (1968 to 1979) with the Atlanta Falcons of the National Football League (NFL); missing the 1970 season due to a knee injury. He had 12 interceptions, 26 quarterback sacks, and 14 fumble recoveries (a Falcons' defensive record) during his NFL career. He led the NFL in fumble recoveries in 1969, and was selected to play in the Pro Bowl that season. He started all 14 games on the 1977 Falcons "Gritz Blitz" defense, with 5½ quarterback sacks, that set the all-time record for fewest points allowed by a team in a 14-game season (129). He was the Falcons' Most Valuable Player in 1978 when the team went to the NFL playoffs for the first time in team history.

Brezina was raised in Louise, Texas and played college football for the Houston Cougars. He and his five brothers — as well as a nephew — all played football at the University of Houston, an NCAA Division I record, under head coach Bill Yeoman. There is a monument to the six brothers outside of the Cougars' football stadium. His brother Bobby Brezina played one game for the Houston Oilers of the American Football League. His brother Mark "Butch" Brezina played for the 1974 World Football League champion Birmingham Americans.

For over four decades since his retirement, Greg Brezina has led Christian Families Today, a non-profit organization in Newnan, Georgia.

== Early life ==
Brezina was born on January 7, 1946, in Sinton, Texas. He was one of eight children (seven sons and one daughter). His father died at age 37, when Brezina was seven. His one-year old brother died of polio six months later. Brezina credited the strength of his mother Gertrude in raising her children as a key to their future success. She had been counseled to divide up her children after her husband's death, but she relied on her faith in keeping her family together.

Brezina attended Louise High School in Louise, Texas, where he played quarterback and linebacker on the school's football team. He was an all-district quarterback as a senior. He was named all-District 27–A as both a quarterback and linebacker his senior year (1963).

== College career ==
Brezina was pursued by the University of Houston, the University of Texas, Baylor University, Texas A&M, Texas Christian University, Southern Methodist University, and Tulane University. He chose to attend the University of Houston, where he played on the Houston Cougars football team, under coach Bill Yeoman. Three of his brothers had attended and played football at Houston before him, and his two younger brothers would likewise go on to play football for the Cougars. Six brothers playing football at one school set an NCAA record. There is a monument to the six of them in the Legends Plaza outside of the school's football stadium; featuring a life-size bronze cougar atop a black onyx marble base with each brother's individual name, and a dedication by Coach Yeoman to them as a group, carved into the monument. It has become a custom that Cougars' team members rub the cougar's head before going onto the field.

Brezina played linebacker at Houston under coach Yeoman. He was reported at 6 ft 1 in (1.85 m) 185 lb (83.9 kg) at the beginning of his sophomore season. Brezina reportedly became a starting outside linebacker for the Cougars as a sophomore. He weighed 205 lb (93 kg) or 215 lb (97.5 kg) going into his junior season, again as a starter. Assistant coach Ben Hurt called Brezina the quickest linebacker he had ever coached going into the 1966 season. He had two interceptions in 1966, but dropped a number of potential interceptions. In his senior season (1967), weighing around 222 lb (100.1 kg), Brezina started at left linebacker again for the Cougars. Another starting outside linebacker was future NFL coach Wade Phillips; the Cougars' group of linebackers referring to themselves as the "mad dogs". Brezina also handled kickoffs for the Cougars in addition to playing linebacker.

The Associated Press (AP) ranked the Cougars in the top-10 teams a number of times during the 1967 season. On September 24, the then unranked Cougars defeated the No. 3 ranked Michigan State Spartans, 37–7. Brezina had 12 unassisted tackles and 11 assisted tackles in that game; being named top "mad dog" that week. Cougars' linebacker coach Howard Tippett described Brezina as being involved in nearly every tackle and never out of position during the game. The next week the AP ranked Houston No. 3 nationally.

The Newspaper Enterprise Association (NEA) named Brezina an honorable mention All-American in 1967. Brezina played in the Blue-Gray Game after his senior season.

== Professional career ==
The Atlanta Falcons drafted Brezina in the 11th round of the 1968 NFL/AFL draft, 275th overall. Brezina had been expecting to be drafted much higher in that draft. He held out briefly before joining the team for its 1968 training camp. During his 1968 Falcons' rookie season, Brezina was in 10 games, starting one. He was a strong player for the Falcons on special teams in his rookie season.

Brezina started 13 games at right linebacker in 1969, and led the NFL in fumble recoveries (5) in 1969. He was selected to the Pro Bowl for the only time in his career. Brezina suffered a knee injury in the Falcons' first preseason game in 1970, eventually requiring surgery. He did not play during the 1970 NFL season.

Brezina returned in 1971, starting all 14 Falcons' games at right linebacker. He had three interceptions and three fumble recoveries that season. He started every game for the Falcons from 1972 to 1974, and missed only one start in 1975. Brezina had three interceptions again in 1973. In 1975, he had a career-high four interceptions, one fumble recovery, and four sacks. Brezina started the first 11 games in the 1976 season, but did not play in the remaining three games after suffering a foot injury.

Brezina started all 14 Falcons' games in 1977, with 5½ sacks, one forced fumble, and one fumble recovery. The Falcons' 1977 defense set the record for fewest points allowed in a 14-game NFL season (129); the NFL's last 14-game season. It was known as the "Gritz Blitz" defense. The following season (1978), Brezina and the Falcons as a team reached the NFL playoffs for the first time; the Falcons having entered the NFL one season before drafting Brezina in 1968. The 32-year old Brezina started all 16 games, and had a career-high nine sacks, two forced fumbles, and one fumble recovery. He was the longest standing Falcon team member; and was considered the leader on its defense; which was the team's strength. Brezina was the team's Most Valuable Player that season.

The Falcons lost in the divisional round of the 1978–79 NFL playoffs to the Dallas Cowboys, 27–20, after winning the wild card round over the Philadelphia Eagles. Brezina forced a fumble against future Hall of Fame running back Tony Dorsett in the divisional round. The Falcons defeated the Philadelphia Eagles, 14–13, in the wild card round. Brezina had a quarterback sack of Ron Jaworski in that game.

In 1979, Brezina suffered minor injuries to his back, hand, foot, and knee; but still started all 16 games, with three sacks, two forced fumbles, and one fumble recovery. Brezina announced his retirement in April 1980, citing the wear and tear of 12 years of professional football on his body. He said at the time "'It's just like having an old suit of clothes where the stitching wears out . . . When it wears out, either you can stitch it back together and go on, or you can throw it away . . . Well, Jerry Rhea (the Falcons' head trainer) has been sewing this old suit for a long time now, and it's time to throw it away'". At the time of his retirement, Brezina had played for every head coach in Falcons' history. It is also reported that Brezina retired because he had sustained a neck injury that could have led to life-long damage if he continued playing.

Brezina started 140 of the 151 regular season games in which he appeared for the Falcons in 11 seasons (missing one season due to a knee injury). He wore jersey No. 50 as a Falcon. He is the all-time Falcons' leader in fumble recoveries by defensive players (14). He also had 12 career interceptions and 26 quarterback sacks. Brezina said that his chief asset at linebacker for the Falcons was "'his quickness and the ability to get to the ball. I'm a runner as a linebacker. My responsibility, like everyone else on the defense, is the whole field'". In 2015, The Atlanta Journal-Constitution named Brezina the 29th greatest player in Falcons' history.

== Personal life ==
Brezina and his wife Connie Brezina have four sons. They live in Newnan, Georgia. After announcing his retirement in 1980, he said he planned to create and operate an evangelical religious retreat. He and Connie Brezina founded Christian Families Today, a counseling and training ministry that he has led for decades. Brezina is executive director and has served as a marriage and family counselor.

In 1971, Brezina became a Christian and changed his life to live by biblical principles; forgoing drinking, swearing, and racial prejudice. He became known as devoutly religious during his playing years. Falcons' coach Norm Van Brocklin nicknamed him "the Reverend". Brezina reportedly did not believe that God would favor one football team over another in the outcome of a game; but believed that individuals who reflected God's glory would be rewarded.

At the end of the 1978 wild card playoff game against the Eagles, Eagles' place kicker Mike Michel missed a 33-yard field goal attempt with 13 seconds left in the wild card game, which would have given the Eagles a victory. Michel had joined the Eagles early in the season as a punter; and only became the Eagles' place kicker for the last five games of the regular season after the team's starting place kicker was injured. The Eagles only allowed Michel to attempt extra point conversion kicks during those games, and he did not attempt any field goals during his five weeks as the team's kicker. The Eagles had no choice but to allow Michel to attempt a field goal in the playoff game against the Falcons.

After missing the final kick by inches, Michel grabbed his ankles and then kneeled to the ground, staring down and not moving. Brezina walked to Michel's side to console him. Brezina said to Michel "'Look, I don't know if you can understand what I'm about to say, but it doesn't really matter if you made the kick or missed it. What matters far more is if you have peace in your heart, which comes through Jesus Christ'". Michel only nodded back, but shortly after that stated this was probably the most comforting thing anyone could have said to him; and that for Brezina "'To have done what he did ... was a real example of a true brother, someone who took the trouble to go far beyond the meaning of the game. I believe in Jesus also'".

Brezina's oldest brother Bobby Brezina was an All-American at Houston and played in one game for the Houston Oilers of the American Football League in 1963. He had been drafted by the Green Bay Packers in the 1963 NFL draft, but released before the 1963 NFL season started. His brother Gus Brezina was also an All-American with the Cougars; and was drafted in the 20th round of the 1965 AFL draft by the Houston Oilers, but did not sign with them. Brezina's brother Mark "Butch" Brezina had discussions in 1974 about playing for the Houston Oilers and Houston Texans in the World Football League (WFL), but played for the Birmingham Americans in the WFL; winning the 1974 WFL championship. It has been stated that Butch was offered a contract by the Houston Oilers.
