= Plainview, Wharton County, Texas =

Plainview, Texas
- Ghost town
- Location within the state of Texas
- Coordinates: 29°06′47.87″N 96°19′31.76″W
- Country: United States
- State: Texas
- County: Wharton
- Elevation: 92 ft (28 m)
- Time zone: UTC-6 (Central (CST))
  - Summer (DST): UTC-5 (CDT)
- ZIP code: 77455
- Area code: 979
- GNIS feature ID: 1380368

Plainview is a ghost town in southwestern Wharton County in the U.S. state of Texas. It was located at the intersection of Farm to Market Road 441 (FM 441) and Farm to Market Road 1163 (FM 1163), southwest of El Campo. The community had its own school from as early as 1916 until 1948. The town hall building still existed in 2014, but there were only a few homes nearby.

== Geography ==
Plainview was situated at the intersection of FM 441 and FM 1163. Approaching the junction from the south, FM 441 curves to the west and FM 1163 curves to the east, while County Road 309 continues north. Louise can be reached by going west via County Road 312, Hillje is to the north on FM 441 and El Campo is to the northeast on FM 1163.

== History ==
There is a published photo of Plainview School #20 taken by County School Superintendent Oswald Garrett in 1916. The school required four mule-drawn wagons at a cost of $100 per month in order to haul the students to class. Altogether, the Plainview school district covered 40 sections. By 1926 there were four teachers, 130 white and four black students. In 1948, the school was merged into what is now the Louise Independent School District. In 1989 the old meeting hall was located at the townsite and it was still there in 2014.

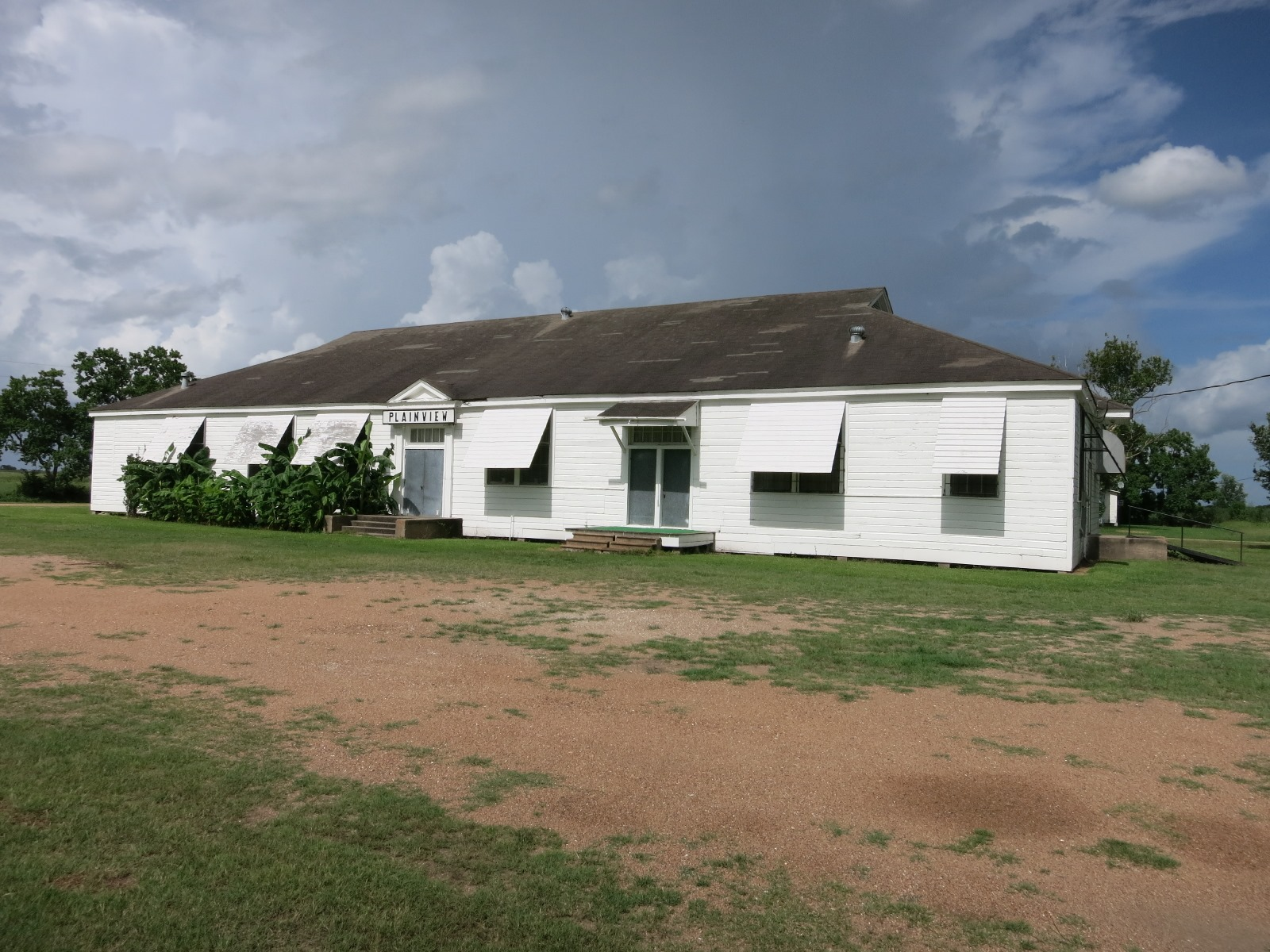
The old Plainview Meeting Hall is located on FM 441.

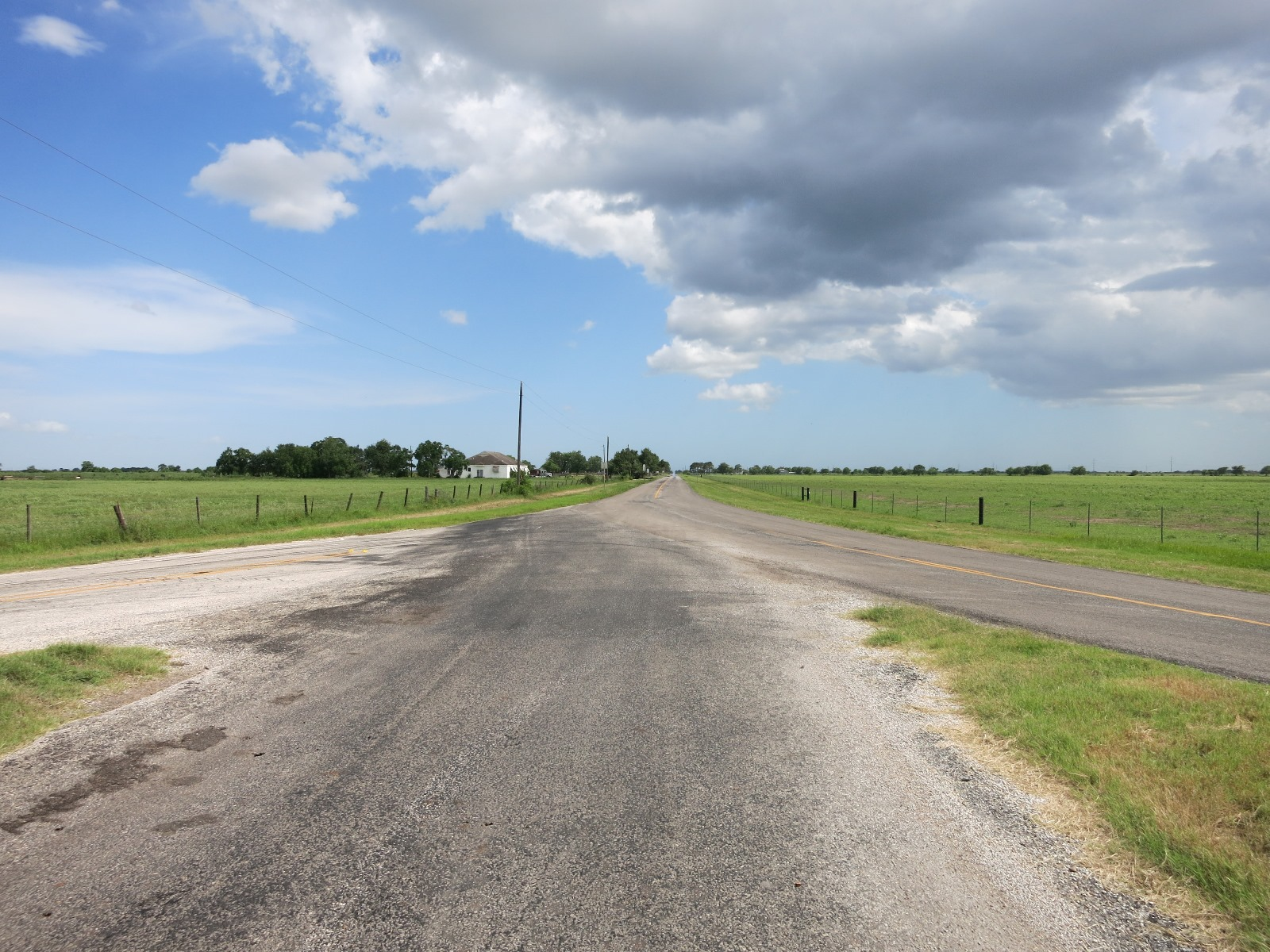
View is south where FM 1163 (left) converges with FM 441 (right).

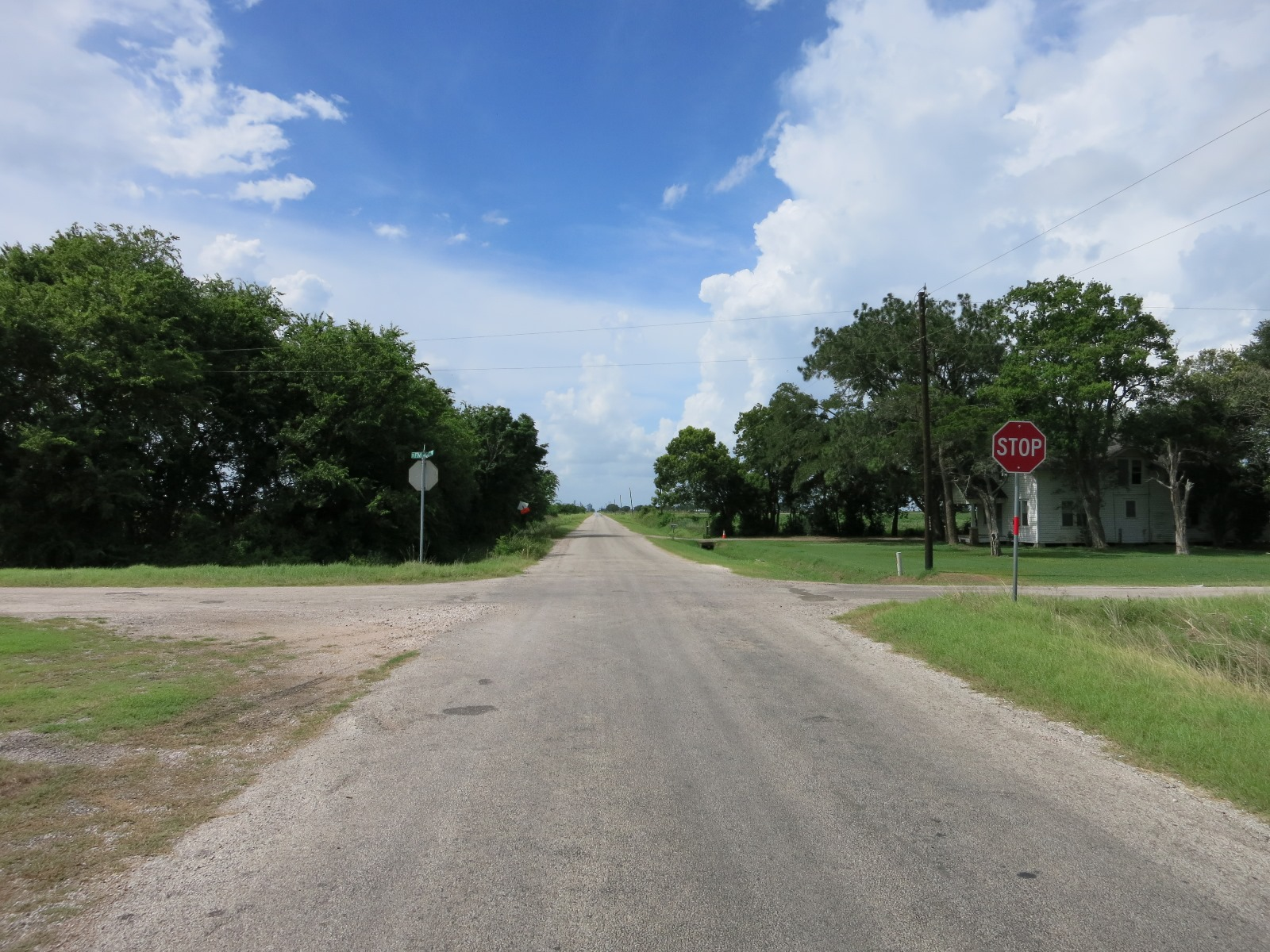
There is a single house at the Plainview crossroads.
