= 2026 Western Athletic Conference baseball tournament =

- Teams: 6
- Format: Double-elimination
- Finals site: Hohokam Stadium; Mesa, Arizona
- Champions: Tarleton State (1st title)
- Winning coach: Fuller Smith (1st title)
- MVP: Raphael Smeenk (Tarleton State)
- Television: ESPN+

2026 Western Athletic Conference baseball standings
	Conf.				Overall
Team	W		L	PCT	W		L	PCT
Tarleton ‍†‍‡‍^{y}	12	–	6	.667	34	–	19	.642
California Baptist ‍‍‍	11	–	7	.611	43	–	13	.768
Utah Tech ‍‍‍	10	–	8	.556	31	–	21	.596
Sacramento State ‍‍‍	10	–	8	.556	26	–	30	.464
Abilene Christian ‍‍‍	8	–	10	.444	25	–	29	.463
UT Arlington ‍‍‍	8	–	10	.444	19	–	30	.388
Utah Valley ‍‍‍	4	–	14	.222	15	–	35	.300
† – Conference champion ‡ – Tournament champion y – Invited to the NCAA Tournament; As of May 17, 2026; Rankings from D1Baseball

The 2026 Western Athletic Conference baseball tournament was held from May 20 through 23 at Hohokam Stadium in Mesa, Arizona. The top six regular season finishers of the conference's seven teams met in the tournament, with the top 2 receiving byes to the second round.

This was the last tournament held under the WAC name. On July 1, 2026, the conference will rebrand as the United Athletic Conference.

== Seeding and format ==
The top six finishers of the league's seven teams qualify for the conference tournament. Teams are seeded based on conference winning percentage, with the first tiebreaker being head-to-head record.

== Bracket ==
Upper round 1
3	Utah Tech	4
6	UT Arlington	0
4	Sacramento State	9
5	Abilene Christian	4
Lower round 1
6	UT Arlington	3
5	Abilene Christian	5

Upper round 2
2	California Baptist	10^{(14)}
3	Utah Tech	7
1	Tarleton State	9
4	Sacramento State	0
Lower round 2
5	Abilene Christian	5
3	Utah Tech	6

Upper final
2	California Baptist	3
1	Tarleton	5
Lower final
3	Utah Tech	3
4	Sacramento State	5

Final
1	Tarleton	21	–
4	Sacramento State	11	–

== Schedule ==
Game	Time (MST)	Matchup^{#}	Score	Notes	Reference
Wednesday, May 20
1	11:00 am	No. 3 Utah Tech vs No. 6 UT Arlington	4–0		
2	3:00 pm	No. 4 Sacramento State vs No. 5 Abilene Christian	9–4		
3	7:00 pm	No. 6 UT Arlington vs No. 5 Abilene Christian	3–5	UT Arlington Eliminated	
Thursday, May 21
4	11:00 am	No. 2 California Baptist vs No. 3 Utah Tech	10–7^{(14)}		
5	3:00 pm	No. 1 Tarleton State vs No. 4 Sacramento State	9-0		
6	7:00 pm	No. 5 Abilene Christian vs No. 3 Utah Tech	5-6	Abilene Christian Eliminated	
Friday, May 22
7	11:00 am	No. 2 California Baptist vs No. 1 Tarleton State	3-5		
8	3:00 pm	No. 3 Utah Tech vs No. 4 Sacramento State	3-5	Utah Tech Eliminated	
9	7:00 pm	No. 4 Sacramento State vs No. 2 California Baptist	12-7	California Baptist Eliminated	
Saturday, May 23
10	3:00 pm	No. 1 Tarleton State vs No. 4 Sacramento State	21-11	Sacramento State Eliminated	

== All–Tournament Team ==
Player	Team
**Raphael Smeenk**	Tarleton State
Sergio Guerra	Tarleton State
Rayner Heinrich	Tarleton State
Slade McCloud	Tarleton State
Carson Lorch (DH)	Tarleton State
Cort Lowry (P)	Tarleton State
Ryan Ellis	Sacramento State
Jace Jeremiah	Sacramento State
Luis Pimentel-Guerrero	Sacramento State
Sean Carey (P)	Sacramento State
Chris Ramirez	California Baptist
Miller Durham	Utah Tech

MVP in bold
