= Hillje, Texas =

- Unincorporated area
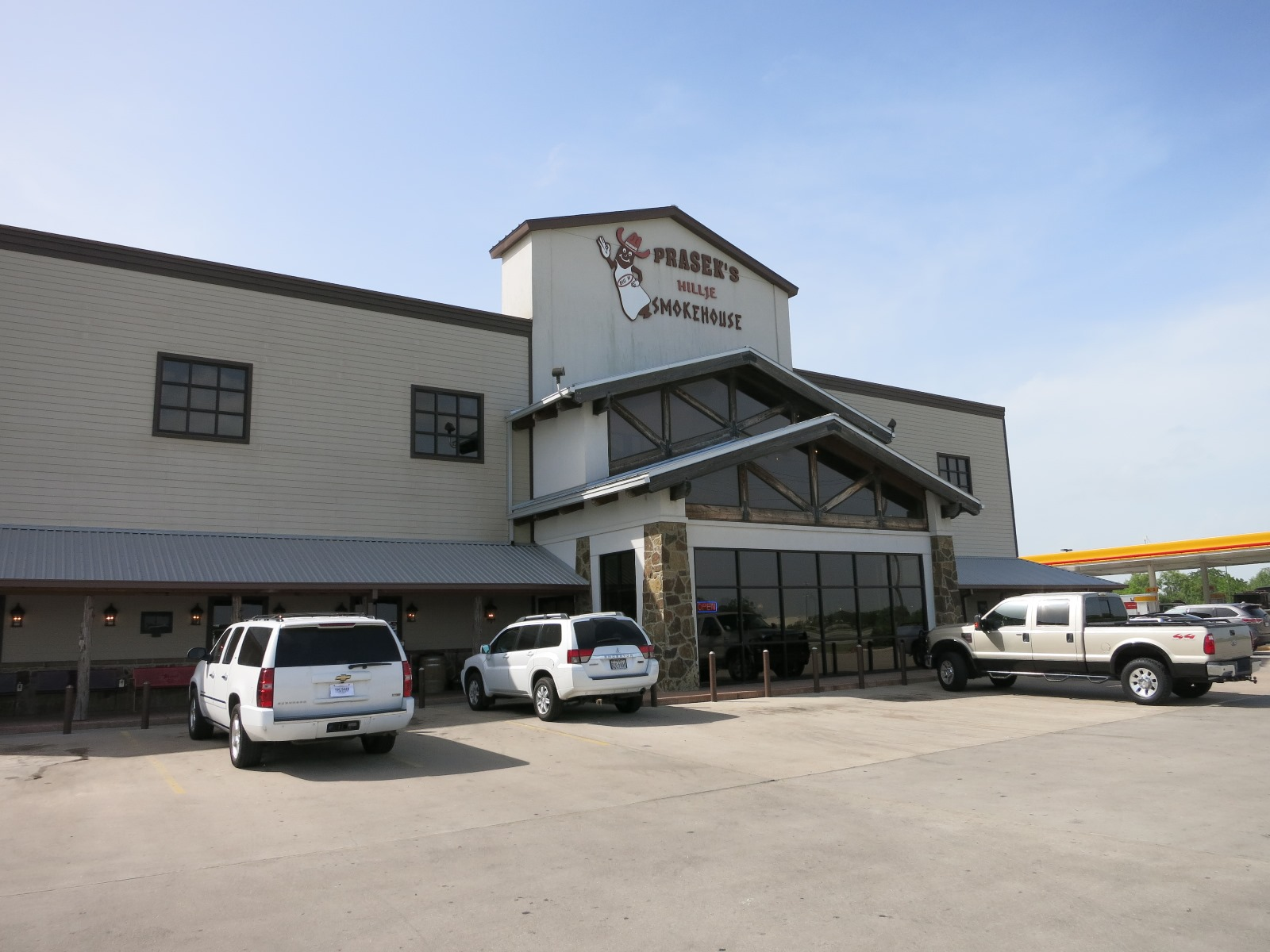
- Prasek's Smoke House is a business on US 59.

- Location within the state of Texas Hillje, Texas (the United States)
- Coordinates: 29°08′56″N 96°20′36″W
- Country: United States
- State: Texas
- County: Wharton
- Elevation: 95 ft (29 m)
- Time zone: UTC-6 (Central (CST))
  - Summer (DST): UTC-5 (CDT)
- ZIP code: 77437
- Area code: 979
- GNIS feature ID: 1359277

Hillje (pronounced "Hill-Gee") is an unincorporated community in Wharton County, Texas, United States. According to the Handbook of Texas, the community had an estimated population of 51 in 2000. It is located within the Greater Houston metropolitan area.

== History ==
The community was named for Fred Hillje, who purchased part of a local ranch in 1888. Many of its earliest settlers were of Czech and German descent and came from Weimar. The New York, Texas and Mexican Railway had a railroad siding called the 45-mile post, which is where Hillje was laid out. L.C. Wychopen opened a general store in 1898. That next year, Hillje was severely damaged by a flood. A post office was established at Hillje in 1899 and remained in operation until 1907. Its population was 20 in 1915 and had the general store and a gin in 1926. The local tax roll listed 40 registered voters in Hillje. There were six women, a mechanic, and a few farmers, all of whom were White. There were five businesses in the community in 1931, as well as a factory, two churches, and a cemetery on the 1936 county highway map. 75 people lived in Hillje from 1939 to 1965; three years later, the population went down to 51 and had no businesses. It returned to five businesses in 1985 and had a church and a community hall. The population remained at 51 in 2000.

== Geography ==
Hillje is located at the junction of U.S. Highway 59 (US 59) and FM 441 in western Wharton County, approximately 18 miles west of Wharton.

== Economy ==
Hillje contains several businesses. Prasek's Hillje Smokehouse is one of the largest businesses in Hillje as well as one of the top employers.

== Education ==
Hillje's first school was opened in 1895. Another school was built in 1926. Both schools had 155 White students, 14 black students, and four teachers. It had one school in 1936.

Public education is provided by the Louise Independent School District. The district's campuses are located in Louise, a few miles west of Hillje on U.S. Highway 59 (US 59).

== Notable person ==
- Hugo Mark Gerbermann, Catholic missionary and bishop.

== Gallery ==
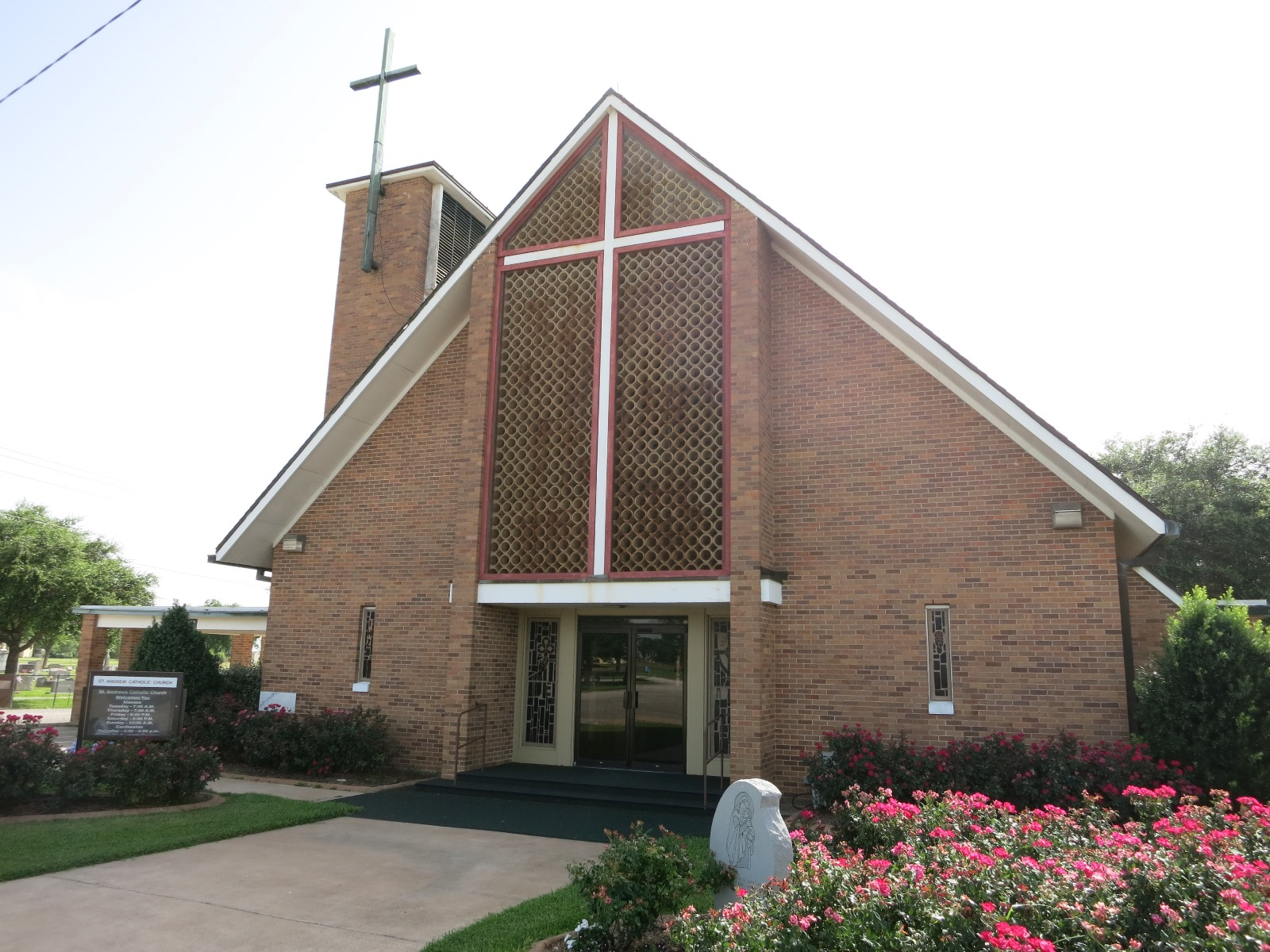
St. Andrew's Catholic Church

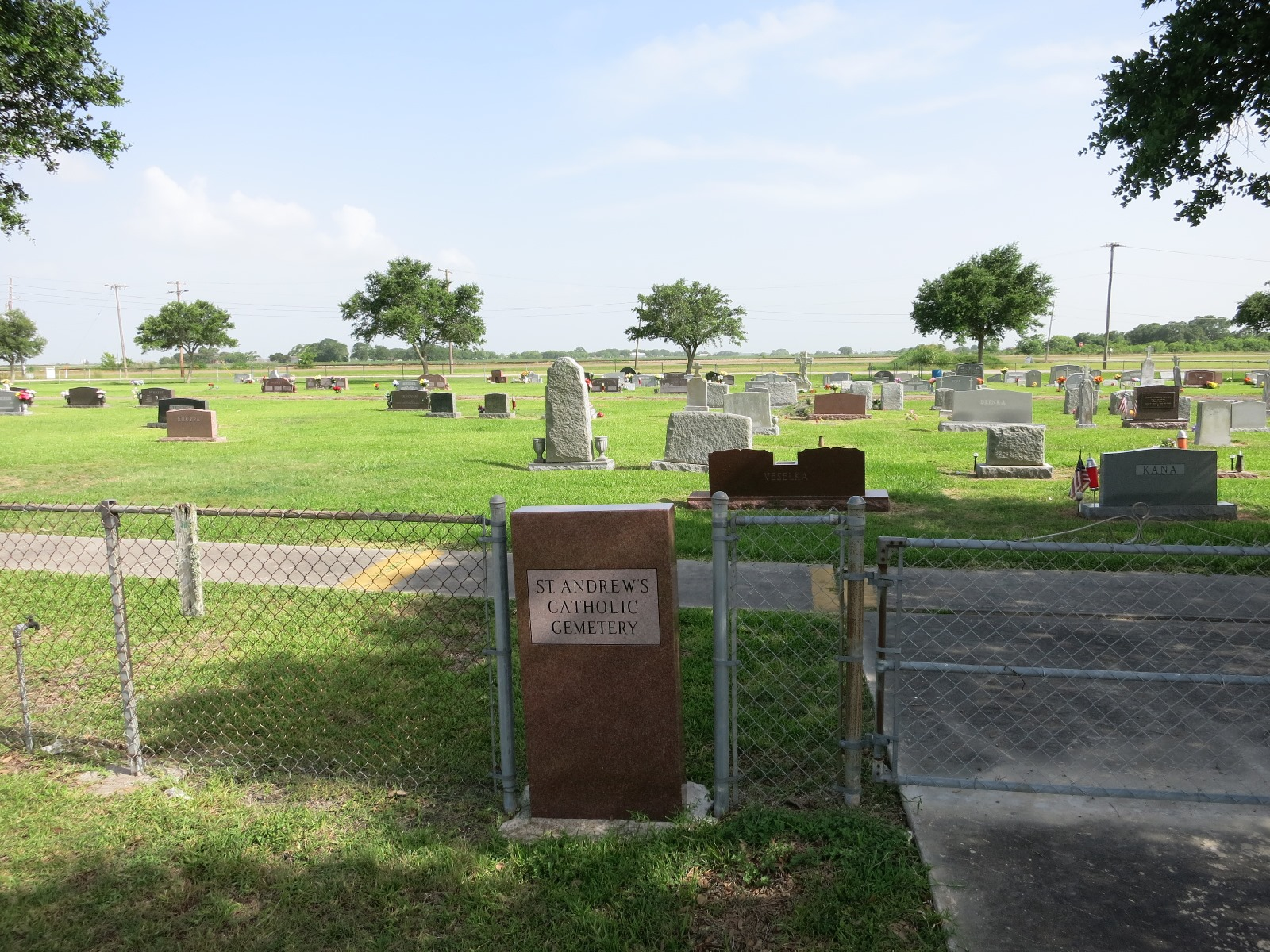
St. Andrew's Cemetery
