= James W. Totman Stadium =

Baseball venue in California

Totman Stadium
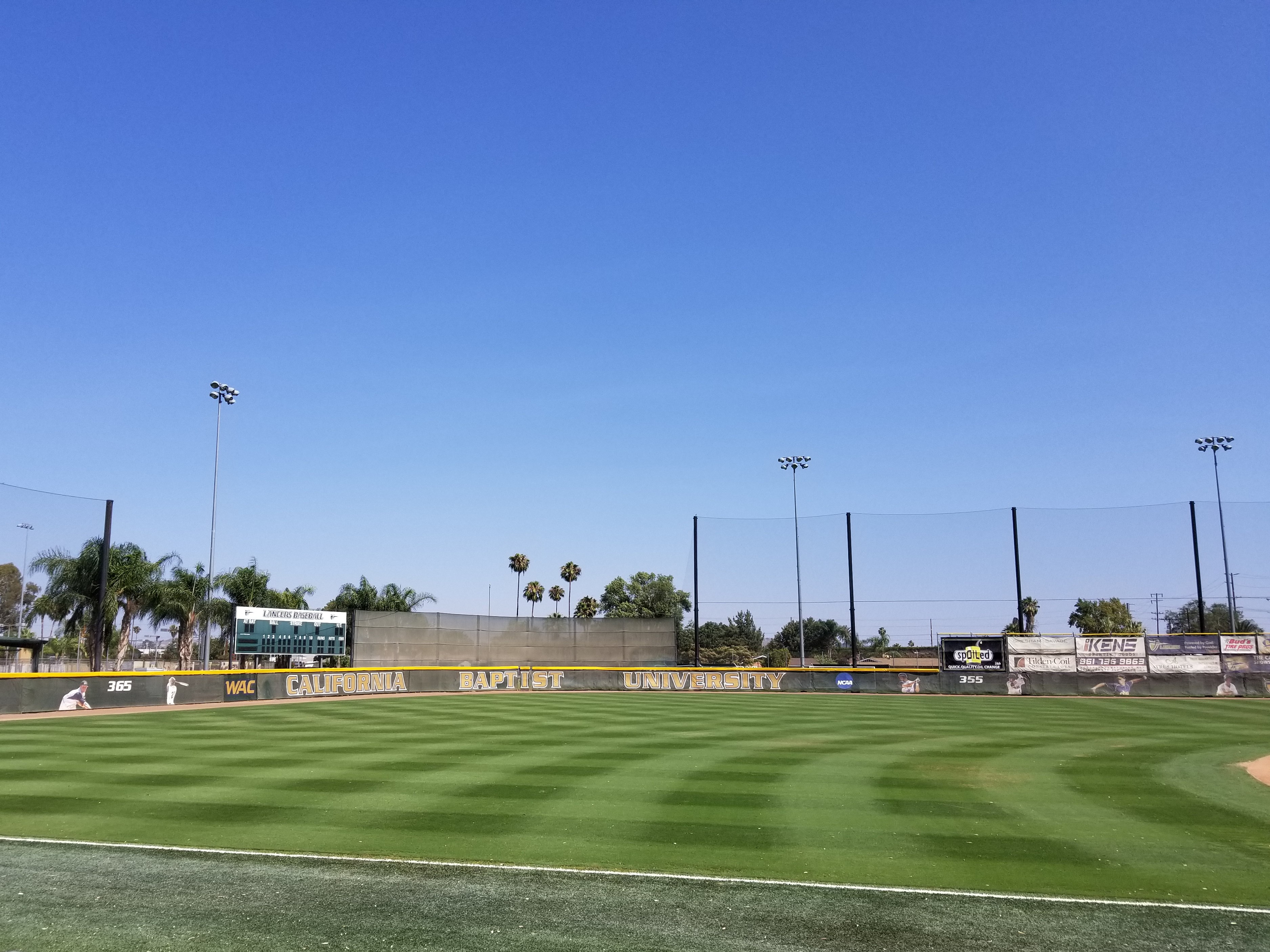
- Interactive map of Totman Stadium
- Full name: James W. Totman Stadium
- Location: 3532 Monroe St; Riverside, CA, 92504
- Coordinates: 33.925579°N 117.428623°W
- Owner: California Baptist University
- Operator: California Baptist University
- Capacity: 800
- Surface: Natural grass & Synthetic turf
- Scoreboard: Electronic
- Field size: Left Field: 332 feet (101 m); Center Field: 405 feet (123 m); Right Field: 315 feet (96 m)

Construction
- Built: 1990
- Opened: 1991
- Renovated: 2007

Tenant
- California Baptist Lancers baseball (NCAA DI WAC) (2007–present)

James W. Totman Stadium is a baseball venue in Riverside, California, United States. It is home to the California Baptist Lancers baseball team of the NCAA Division I Big West Conference. The field's namesake is James W. Totman, a former local contractor.

== History ==
The field opened in 1991 and was remodeled in 2007, the field was constructed with seating areas, a scoreboard and dugouts, a press box and a backstop with netting.

== Features ==
The field's features include a natural grass playing surface with foul territory made of synthetic turf, a press box, an electronic scoreboard, dugouts, a brick backstop, restrooms, and concessions.

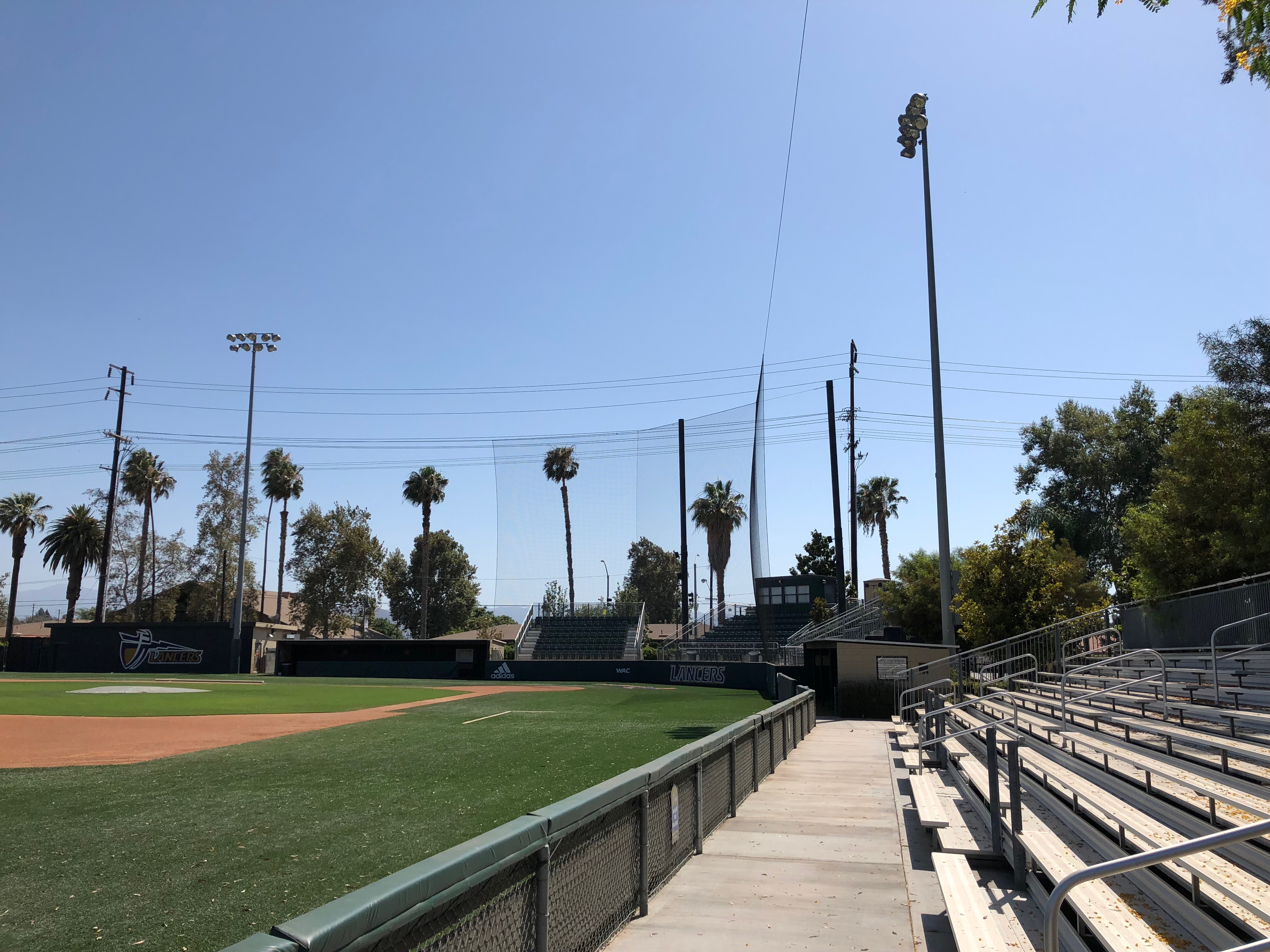
View from the third base side

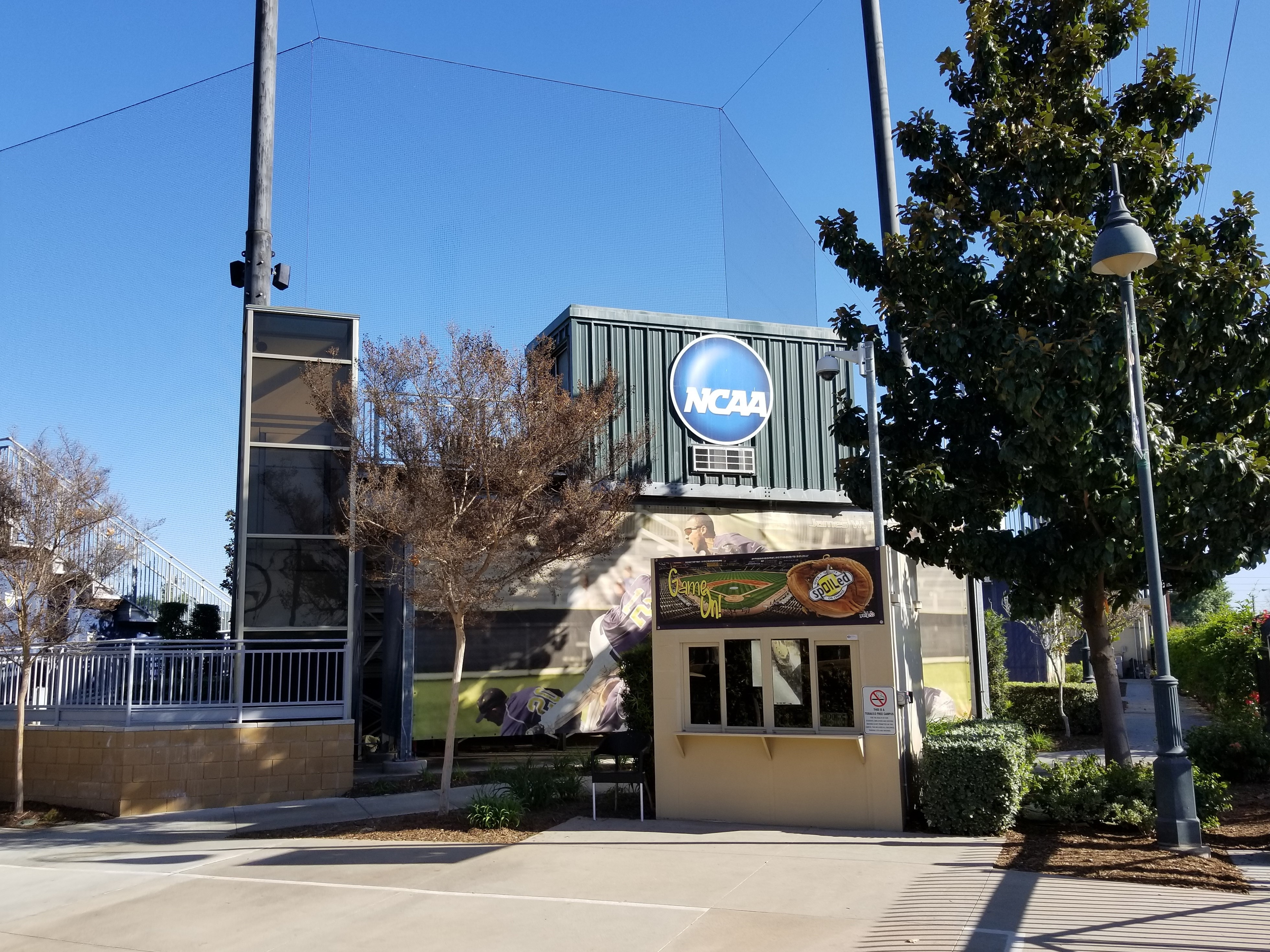
Grandstands

== See also ==
- List of NCAA Division I baseball venues
