= 2025 Western Athletic Conference baseball tournament =

- Teams: 8
- Format: Single-elimination/Double-elimination
- Finals site: Hohokam Stadium; Mesa, Arizona
- Champions: Utah Valley (2nd title)
- Winning coach: Nate Rasmussen (1st title)
- MVP: Mason Strong (Utah Valley)
- Television: ESPN+

2025 Western Athletic Conference baseball standings
	Conf.				Overall
Team	W		L	PCT	W		L	PCT
Sacramento State ‍†‍‍	15	–	9	.625	32	–	26	.552
Abilene Christian ‍†‍‍	15	–	9	.625	34	–	23	.596
Utah Valley ‍‍‡‍^{y}	13	–	11	.542	33	–	29	.532
Grand Canyon ‍‍‍	13	–	11	.542	31	–	27	.534
California Baptist ‍‍‍	12	–	12	.500	30	–	27	.526
Tarleton ‍‍‍	12	–	12	.500	24	–	32	.429
UT Arlington ‍‍‍	11	–	13	.458	21	–	33	.389
Utah Tech ‍‍‍	9	–	15	.375	24	–	31	.436
Seattle ‍‍‍	8	–	16	.333	20	–	32	.385
† – Conference champion ‡ – Tournament champion y – Invited to the NCAA Tournament; As of June 1, 2025; Rankings from D1Baseball

The 2025 Western Athletic Conference baseball tournament was held from May 21 through 24 at Hohokam Stadium in Mesa, Arizona. The top eight regular season finishers of the conference's nine teams met in the tournament, with the top 4 receiving byes to the double-elimination rounds.

== Seeding and format ==
The top eight finishers of the league's nine teams qualify for the conference tournament. Teams are seeded based on conference winning percentage, with the first tiebreaker being head-to-head record.

== Bracket ==
Play-in round Tuesday, May 20
Game 1
5	Cal Baptist	5
8	Utah Tech	6 (11)
Game 2
6	Tarleton State	1
7	UT Arlington	10

Second round Wednesday, May 21
Game 3
4	Grand Canyon	7
8	Utah Tech	6
Game 4
3	Utah Valley	17 (8)
7	UT Arlington	7
Lower third round Thursday, May 22
Game 7
8	Utah Tech	5
2	Abilene Christian	9
Game 8
7	UT Arlington	9
4	Grand Canyon	7

Third round Thursday, May 22
Game 5
1	Sacramento State	7
4	Grand Canyon	5
Game 6
2	Abilene Christian	1
3	Utah Valley	3
Lower semifinal Friday, May 23
Game 10
2	Abilene Christian	9
7	UT Arlington	7

Semifinals; Friday, May 23
Game 9
1	Sacramento State	1
3	Utah Valley	9
Lower final Friday, May 23
Game 11
1	Sacramento State	0
2	Abilene Christian	7

Final; Saturday, May 24
Games 12/13
3	Utah Valley	11	–
2	Abilene Christian	9	–

== Schedule ==
Game	Time*	Matchup^{#}	Score	Notes	Reference
Tuesday, May 20
1	12:00 pm	No. 7 UT Arlington vs No. 6 Tarleton State	10−1	Tarleton State Eliminated	
2	4:00 pm	No. 8 Utah Tech vs No. 5 California Baptist	6−5 (F/11)	California Baptist Eliminated	
Wednesday, May 21
3	12:00 pm	No. 7 UT Arlington vs No. 3 Utah Valley	7−17 (F/8)		
4	4:00 pm	No. 8 Utah Tech vs No. 4 Grand Canyon	6−7		
Thursday, May 22
5	9:30 am	No. 3 Utah Valley vs No. 2 Abilene Christian	3−1		
6	12:30 pm	No. 4 Grand Canyon vs No. 1 Sacramento State	5−7		
7	4:00 pm	No. 8 Utah Tech vs No. 2 Abilene Christian	5−9	Utah Tech Eliminated	
8	7:00 pm	No. 7 UT Arlington vs No. 4 Grand Canyon	9−7	Grand Canyon Eliminated	
Friday, May 23
9	11:00 am	No. 3 Utah Valley vs No. 1 Sacramento State	9−1		
10	3:00 PM	No. 7 UT Arlington vs No. 2 Abilene Christian	7−9	UT Arlington Eliminated	
11	7:00 PM	No. 2 Abilene Christian vs No. 1 Sacramento State	7−0	Sacramento State Eliminated	
Saturday, May 24
12	3:00 PM	No. 3 Utah Valley vs No. 2 Abilene Christian	11−9	Abilene Christian Eliminated	

== All–Tournament Team ==
Player	Team
**Mason Strong**	Utah Valley
CJ Colyer	Utah Valley
Colton Kennedy	Utah Valley
Corbin Kirk	Utah Valley
Dominic Longo II	Utah Valley
Jayden Smith	Utah Valley
Xavier Melendez	UT Arlington
Chandler Benson	Abilene Christian
Diego Cardenas	Abilene Christian
Zandt Payne	Abilene Christian
Dominick Reid	Abilene Christian
Grant Watkins	Abilene Christian

MVP in bold
