= Louise, Texas =

- CDP
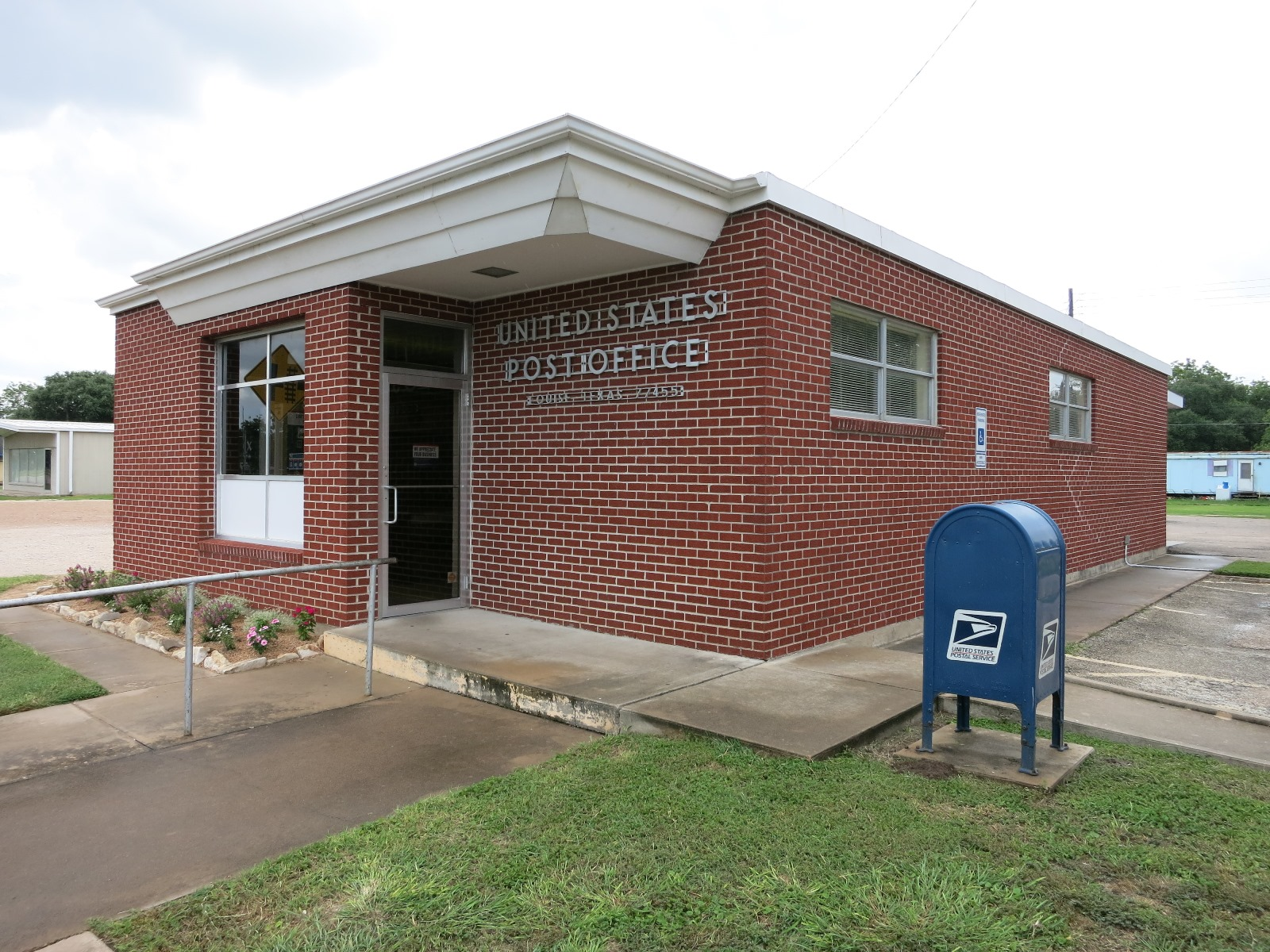
- Post office
- Nickname: LTX
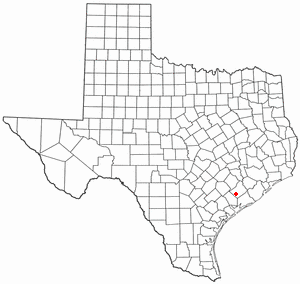
- Location of Louise, Texas

- Coordinates: 29°6′42″N 96°24′37″W
- Country: United States
- State: Texas
- County: Wharton

Area
  - Total: 6.7 sq mi (17.4 km^{2})
- Elevation: 85 ft (26 m)

Population (2020)
  - Total: 889
  - Density: 132/sq mi (51.1/km^{2})
- Time zone: UTC-6 (Central (CST))
  - Summer (DST): UTC-5 (CDT)
- ZIP code: 77455
- Area code: 979
- FIPS code: 48-44212
- GNIS feature ID: 1361870

Louise is a census-designated place (CDP) in southwestern Wharton County, Texas, United States. Louise started as a station on a newly built railroad in 1881. The area soon proved especially suited for rice growing. Other crops were successful and oil and gas were produced in the area. The population peaked in 1960, then declined, then rose again. Louise operates its own school district. The population is currently 889 as of 2020.

== Geography ==
Louise is located on U.S. Route 59 a distance of 9 mi (14 km) west of El Campo in far southwestern Wharton County. East Mustang Creek passes east of Louise. The elevation is 85 ft (26 m).

The Louise CDP has a total area of 6.7 sq mi (17.4 km^{2}).

== Demographics ==
Historical population
| Census | Pop. | Note | %± |
|---|---|---|---|
| 1900 | 279 | | — |
| 1920 | 300 | | — |
| 1930 | 527 | | 75.7% |
| 1940 | 450 | | −14.6% |
| 1960 | 900 | | — |
| 1980 | 310 | | — |
| 1990 | 310 | | 0.0% |
| 2000 | 977 | | 215.2% |
| 2010 | 995 | | 1.8% |
| 2020 | 889 | | −10.7% |
U.S. Decennial Census; 1850–1900 1910; 1920 1930 1940; 1950 1960 1970; 1980 1990 2000; 2010 2020; Wharton County History, p. 29; Texas Handbook: LOUISE, TX

Louise first appeared as a census designated place in the 2000 U.S. census.

=== 2020 census ===
Louise CDP, Texas – Racial and ethnic composition Note: the US Census treats Hispanic/Latino as an ethnic category. This table excludes Latinos from the racial categories and assigns them to a separate category. Hispanics/Latinos may be of any race.
| Race / Ethnicity (NH = Non-Hispanic) | Pop 2000 | Pop 2010 | Pop 2020 | % 2000 | % 2010 | % 2020 |
|---|---|---|---|---|---|---|
| White alone (NH) | 558 | 562 | 411 | 57.11% | 56.48% | 46.23% |
| Black or African American alone (NH) | 53 | 85 | 63 | 5.42% | 8.54% | 7.09% |
| Native American or Alaska Native alone (NH) | 1 | 3 | 0 | 0.10% | 0.30% | 0.00% |
| Asian alone (NH) | 0 | 0 | 3 | 0.00% | 0.00% | 0.34% |
| Native Hawaiian or Pacific Islander alone (NH) | 0 | 0 | 0 | 0.00% | 0.00% | 0.00% |
| Other race alone (NH) | 0 | 0 | 9 | 0.00% | 0.00% | 1.01% |
| Mixed race or Multiracial (NH) | 6 | 4 | 20 | 0.61% | 0.40% | 2.25% |
| Hispanic or Latino (any race) | 359 | 341 | 383 | 36.75% | 34.27% | 43.08% |
| Total | 977 | 995 | 889 | 100.00% | 100.00% | 100.00% |

According to the 2018 American Community Survey five-year estimate, Louise had a population of 935. Of these persons, 394 were male and 541 were female. The median age was 34.8. Of the estimated population, 34 were under 5 years of age, 51 were 5–9 years, 63 were 10–14 years, 151 were 15–19 years, 73 were 20–24 years, 104 were 25–34 years, 88 were 35–44 years, 243 were 45–54 years, 38 were 55–59 years, 25 were 60–64 years, 23 were 65–74 years, 42 were 75–84 years, and 0 were 85 years or over.

There were 848 persons who identified their race as white while 87 persons who belonged to another race. No persons claimed to be African-Americans. The population included 576 persons of Hispanic or Latino ethnicity and 359 persons who identified as non-Hispanic white. Of those persons who claimed to be Hispanic, there were 547 persons of Mexican ancestry, 25 of Cuban ancestry, and four others. There were 347 housing units. There were 594 persons of voting age (18) of whom 245 were men and 349 were women. There were 231 foreign-born persons in Louise. Of these, 100 were naturalized citizens and 131 were non-citizens.

There were 505 workers aged 16 or greater. Among commuters, 93.7% drove to work alone while 6.3% carpooled. The proportion of people who worked in the county was 75.8% while 24.2% worked outside the county. The proportion of employees working at home were 12.3% while 87.7% worked outside their place of residence. Average commute time to work was 20.1 minutes. Of working families, 24.4% had one vehicle, 35.0% had two vehicles, and 40.6% had three vehicles available.

Of the 563 persons of age 25 or older, 198 had less than a high school education, 137 had a high school diploma only, 150 had some college courses or an associate degree, 47 had a bachelor's degree, and 31 had an advanced degree. The median income was $26,420. Out of the 787 persons who were 15 years and older, 127 earned less than $10,000, 29 earned $10,000–$14,999, 131 earned $15,000–$24,999, 134 earned $25,000–$34,999, 70 earned $35,000–$49,999, 75 earned $50,000–$64,999, 0 earned $65,000–$74,999, and 58 earned $75,000 or more.

Marital status among the 787 persons 15 or older is 37.2% never married, 42.6% currently married and not separated, 15.0% divorced or separated, and 5.2% widowed. The number of persons living in rental housing was 79, while 839 persons lived in owner-occupied housing. The proportion of private industry workers was 77.2%, government workers 15.4%, and self-employed workers in non-incorporated business 7.3%. The proportion of workers in industries was as follows: agriculture and forestry 25.7%, construction 5.3%, manufacturing 10.7%, retail 24.2%, transportation 2.8%, finance 0.0%, science and professional 6.3%, education 17.6%, arts and recreation 4.2%, others 0.0%, public administration 3.2%, and armed forces 0.0%.

There were 127 (13.6%) disabled persons of whom 80 were white and 47 Hispanic or Latino. Of these, 77 had hearing problems, 23 had cognitive difficulties, 73 experienced ambulatory difficulty, 46 had self-care problems, and 52 had trouble living independently. There were six veterans. There were 23 households receiving food stamps (SNAP) of which five were white and 18 Hispanic or Latino. Out of 918 persons whose poverty status was calculated, 102 were below 100% of the poverty level, 110 were at 100%–150% of the poverty level, and 704 were above 150% of the poverty level.

== History ==
A Native American campsite was discovered approximately 4 mi (6 km) north of Louise on West Mustang Creek. This is the earliest known settlement near Louise. Stage Stand Creek is about 2 mi (3 km) east of Louise. The creek was supposedly named because the stagecoach once stopped there on its journey between Texana on the west and Egypt and Richmond on the east. A nearby location along East Mustang Creek was once known as Santa Anna's Crossing. Originally part of Jackson County, the area became part of Wharton County in 1846. During the mid-1800s, the region had few settlers and they were mostly ranchers who let their cattle roam freely.

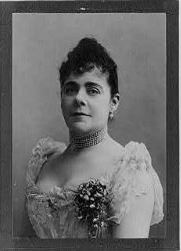
The town was named after Louise Mackay.

In 1881–82, silver mine co-owner John William Mackay constructed the New York, Texas and Mexican Railway between Rosenberg and Victoria. Italian Count Joseph Telfener, engineer and president of the company, recruited many of the builders, which resulted in the nickname the "Macaroni Line". The railroad had six stations, one of which was named Louise after Mackay's wife, Louise Hungerford Mackay. In 1888, there were 100 residents and the first post office was set up. G. M. Sadler and A. F. Brown soon bought the land. In June 1893, Sadler and Brown filed a plat of survey of Louise and began selling city lots and farm tracts. Their sales material called Louise "the greatest country on earth" and touted it as a rice-growing area.

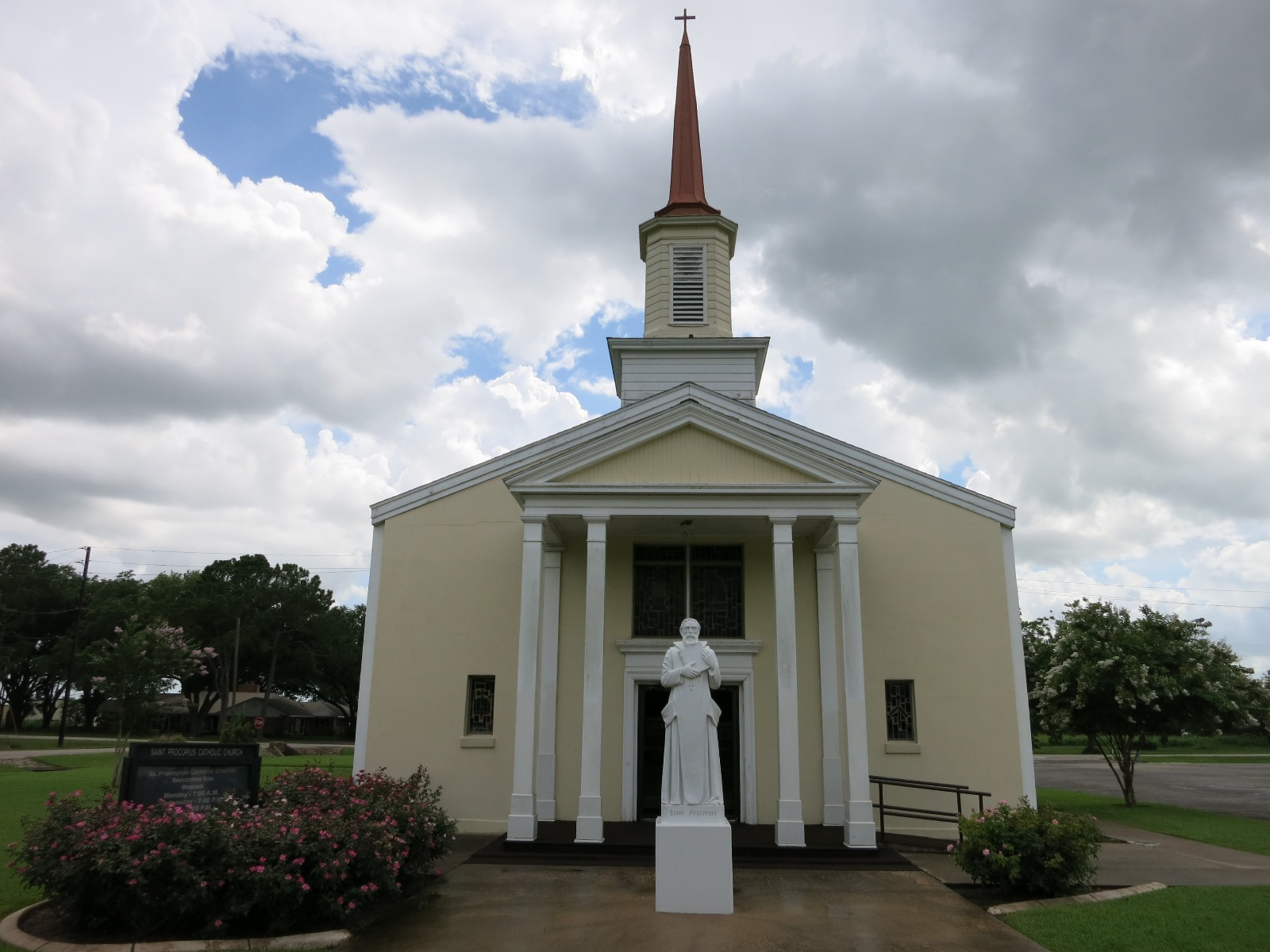
St. Procopius Catholic Church

By 1900, the railroad was owned by the Galveston, Harrisburg and San Antonio Railway, which was represented by its local agent D. D. Hillyard. In 1901, Sadler and partners built a water-pumping plant. Sadler built the Rice Hotel in 1901. H. P. Stockton was traveling by train, stopped to eat dinner, and found that the train left without him. He stayed overnight in Louise and decided to make it his hometown. In 1903, Sadler sold Stockton the Rice Hotel, the Peoples Bank, and the Louise Trading Company. The same year, Sadler planted 426 acres (172 ha) of rice and made a net profit of $18,000. Soon afterward, K. H. Payne and William Thomas set up a well-drilling business and began drilling the first deep-water wells for rice irrigation found on the Texas Gulf Coast. Louise State Bank was chartered in 1905 and taken over by Peoples State Bank in 1927.

Rice was the major crop, but farmers also planted corn, cotton, and milo. A number of ethnic groups moved to the area so that the population rose to 300 in 1925. In that year, Louise boasted 25 stores, three garages, two banks, two lumberyards, and two rice warehouses. The Methodist church was constructed in 1894; it was used as a community school until 1903. The Baptist church was built in 1905. Construction of Saint Procopius Catholic Church began in 1945. Until it was built, Catholics traveled to Hillje for mass. Wildcatters began exploring for oil and gas in the 1930s and oil wells were drilled nearby. R. H. B. Hancock transported a rice mill and dryer from Port Lavaca to Louise in 1938.

The population reached a high of 900 in 1960. Louise featured a large billboard, called the "Outdoor Newspaper", which got national attention. Attracted by big cities, young people began moving away so that by 1980 the population declined to 310. In 1990, the recorded population was 310 again. Fiesta Rice was a major local corporation. The 2000 census recorded 977 residents living in Louise.

Louise is home of the "Brezina Boys", six brothers who all played football for the University of Houston. Greg Brezina went on to play for the Atlanta Falcons. His five brothers were Bob, Gus, Bernie, Steve, and Mark.

== Education ==
Louise is served by the Louise Independent School District, which was incorporated in 1908. However, another source listed 97 students in Louise School District No. 51 in 1905–06. A 1922 photo shows four female and one male teachers. A photo of the 1926 high school senior class shows 11 females and four males. In 1927, there were 212 students and four teachers. The Louise district absorbed several surrounding school districts over time: Sandies in 1938, Adams, Carancahua, and Plainview in 1948, and Gobbler Creek in 1951. In 1990, the Louise schools counted 448 students and 36 faculty members.

The Texas Legislature assigns all of Wharton County to Wharton County Junior College.
