= Louise Independent School District =

School district in Texas, United States

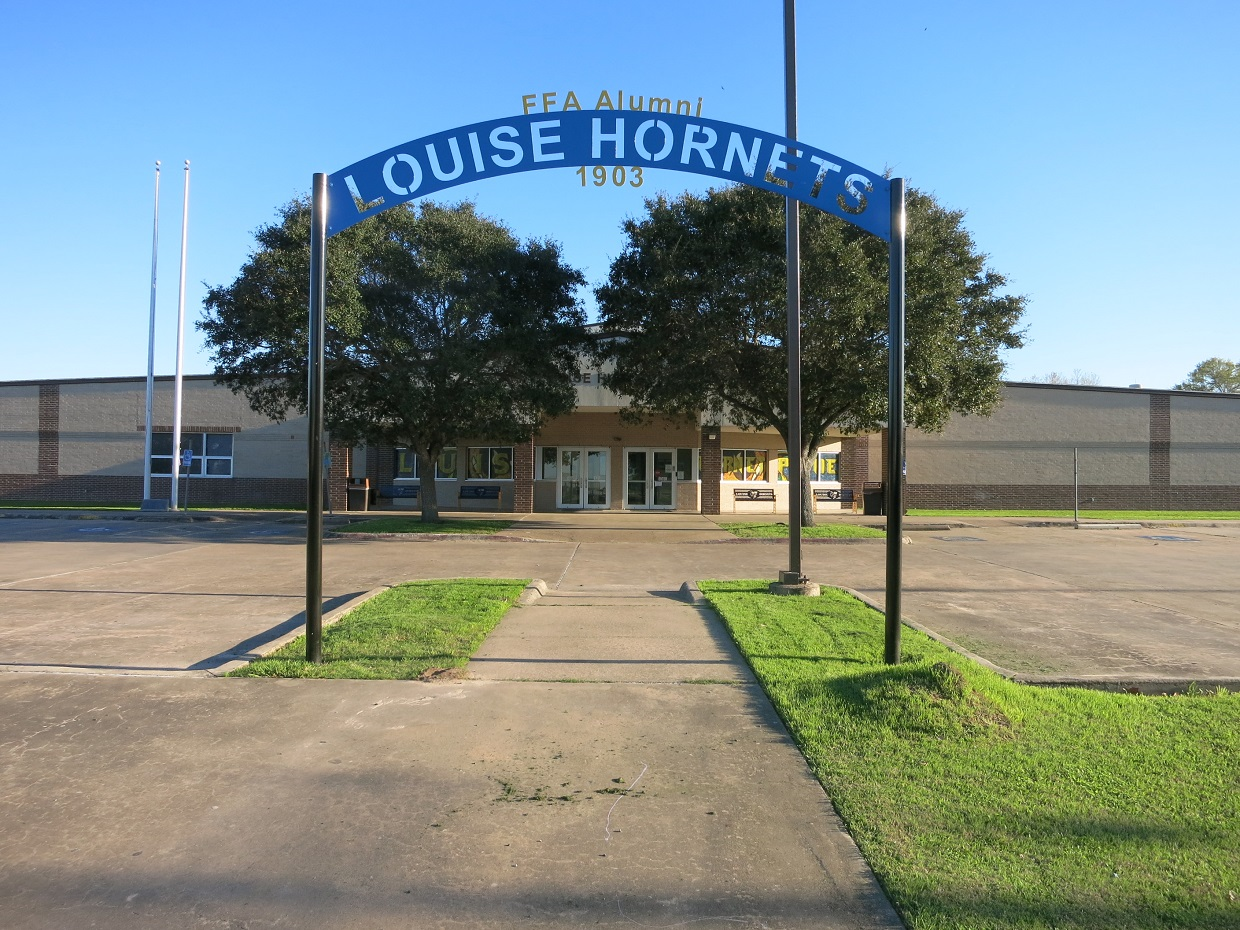
- Louise Hornets sign at the High School

Address
- 408 2nd Street, Louise, TX 77455 Wharton County; United States

District information
- Motto: Educate the whole child
- Grades: Accountability Rating: C (2018)
- Superintendent: Dr. Garth Oliver
- School board: Linda Alderson, Alfred Ochoa Jr., Mark Bain, Amanda Cox, Jay Heard, Chris Faas, Marco Munoz
- Chair of the board: Linda Alderson
- Budget: $6,526,102 (2019)

Students and staff
- Students: 481 (2016–17)
- District mascot: Hornets

Other information
- Website: www.louiseisd.org

Louise Independent School District is a public school district based in the community of Louise, Texas (USA).

== History ==
The Louise Independent School District was established in 1908. By 1927, there were 212 students and four teachers. In 1990 the Louise schools counted 448 students and 36 faculty members. The Louise district absorbed several surrounding school districts over the years, Sandies in 1938, Adams, Plainview, and Carancahua in 1948, and Gobbler Creek in 1951.

== Schools ==
The district has three campuses - Louise High School (Grades 9–12); Louise Junior High School (grades 6–8) and Louise Elementary School (Grades PK–5).

The district is a UIL 2A district. The high school competes in football, volleyball, basketball, baseball, softball, power lifting, track, cross country, golf, tennis, and marching band. In 2009–2010, Louise High School went to state for volleyball.

In 2007–2008 the high school and elementary schools were ranked "Recognized" by the Texas Education Agency. The campuses and the district meet the Adequate Yearly Progress required by the federal No Child Left Behind Act. In 2009, the school district was rated "academically acceptable" by the Texas Education Agency.

The superintendent is Garth Oliver, who was hired in 2015. The district has 81 employees.

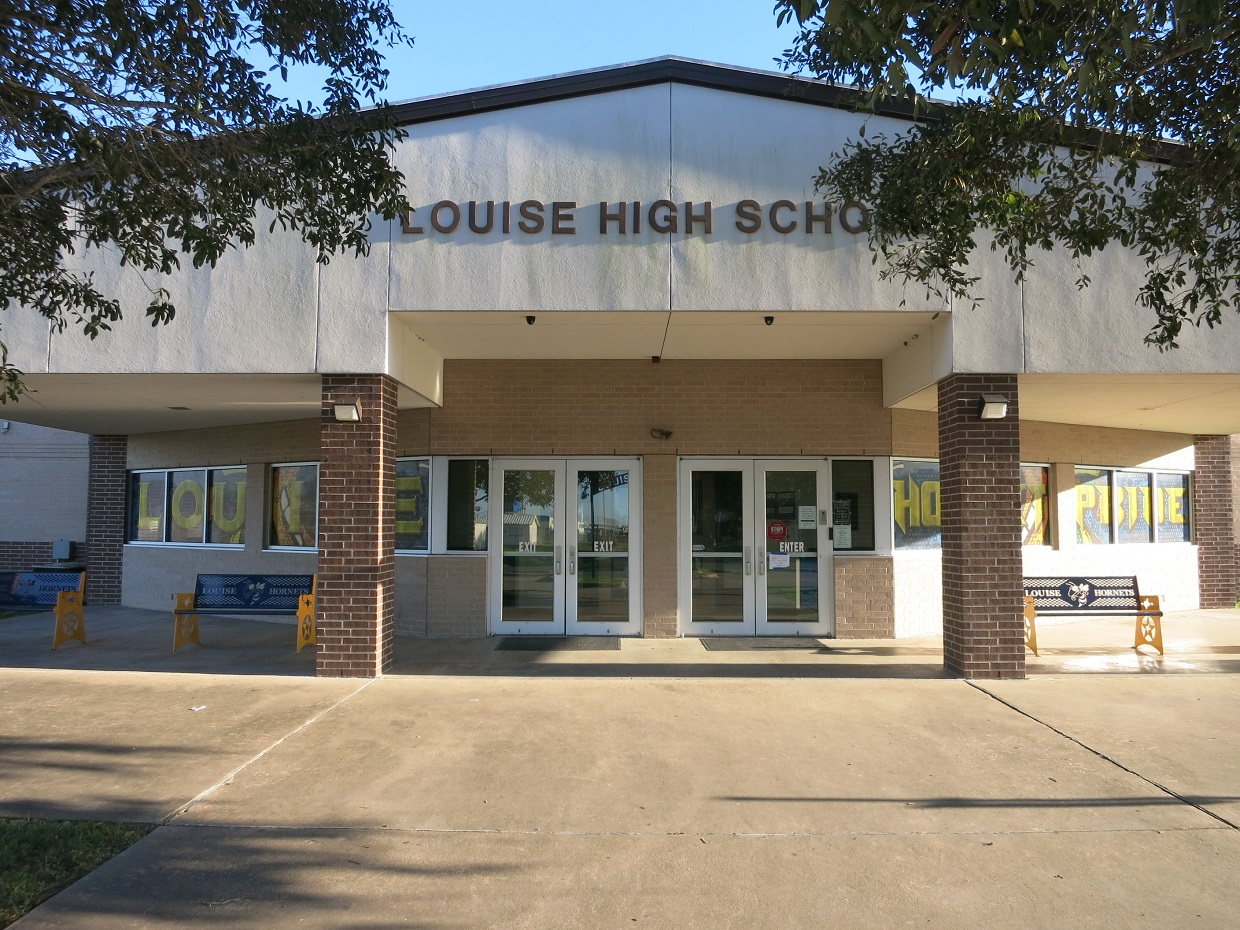
Louise High School

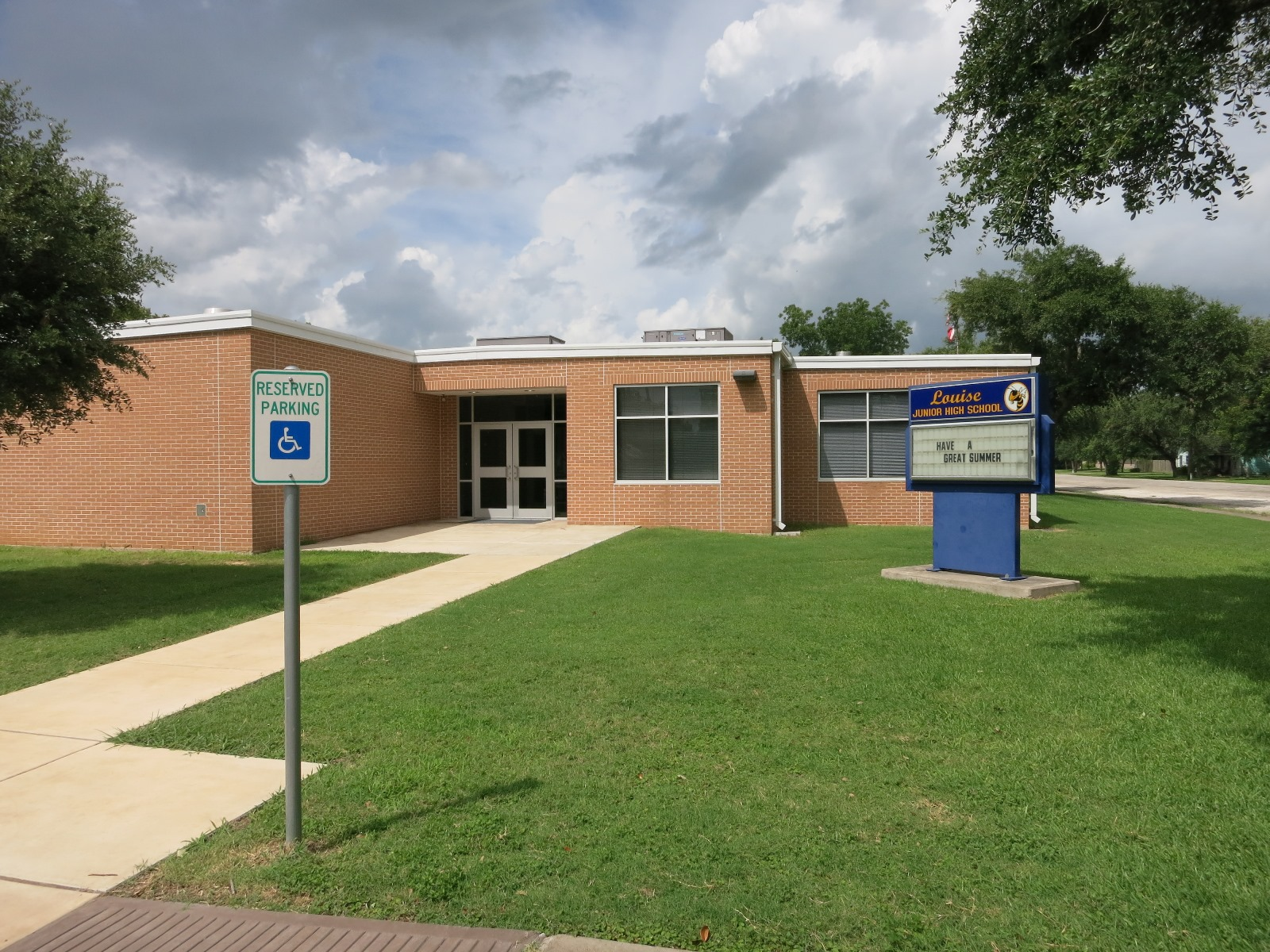
Louise Junior High School

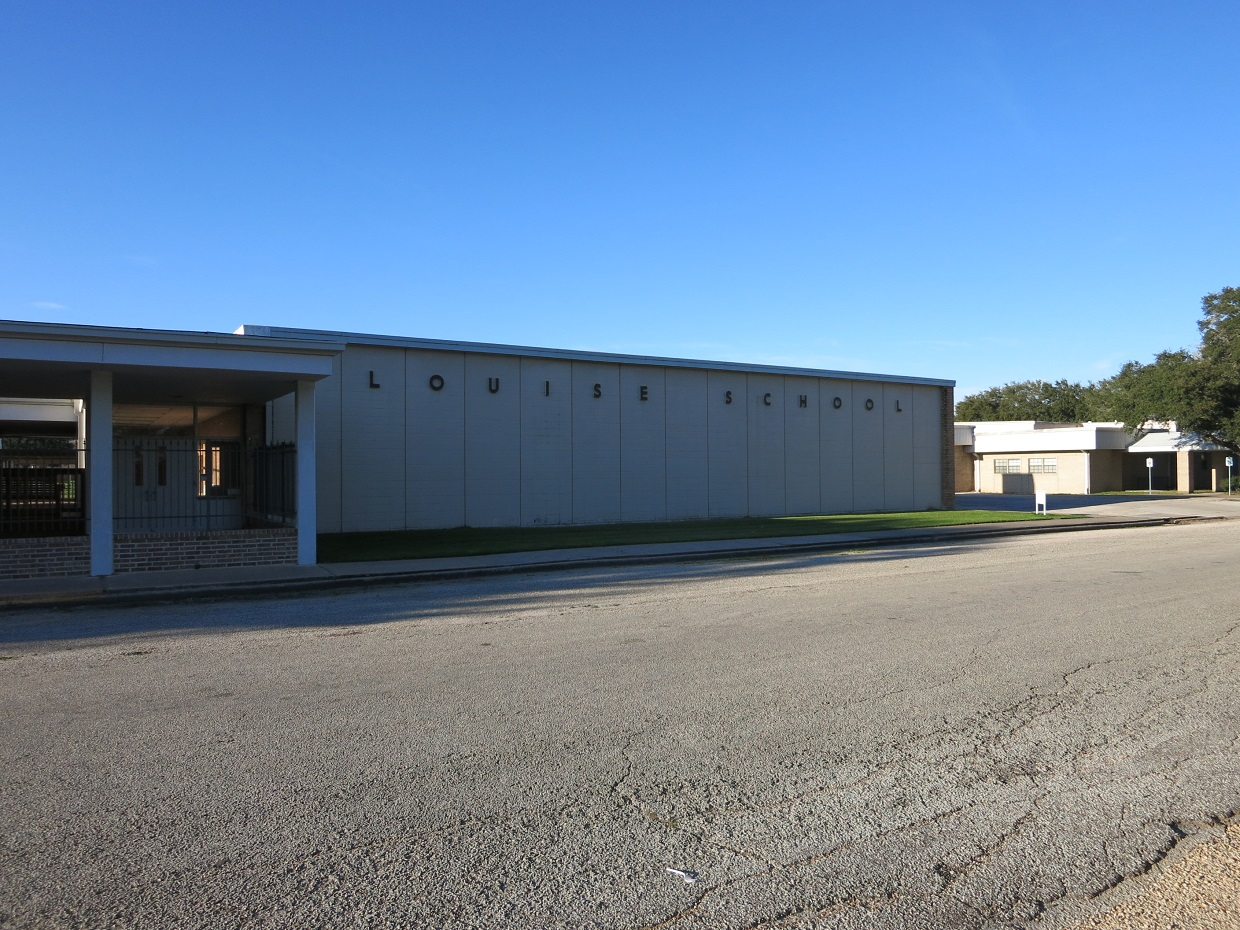
Louise Elementary School

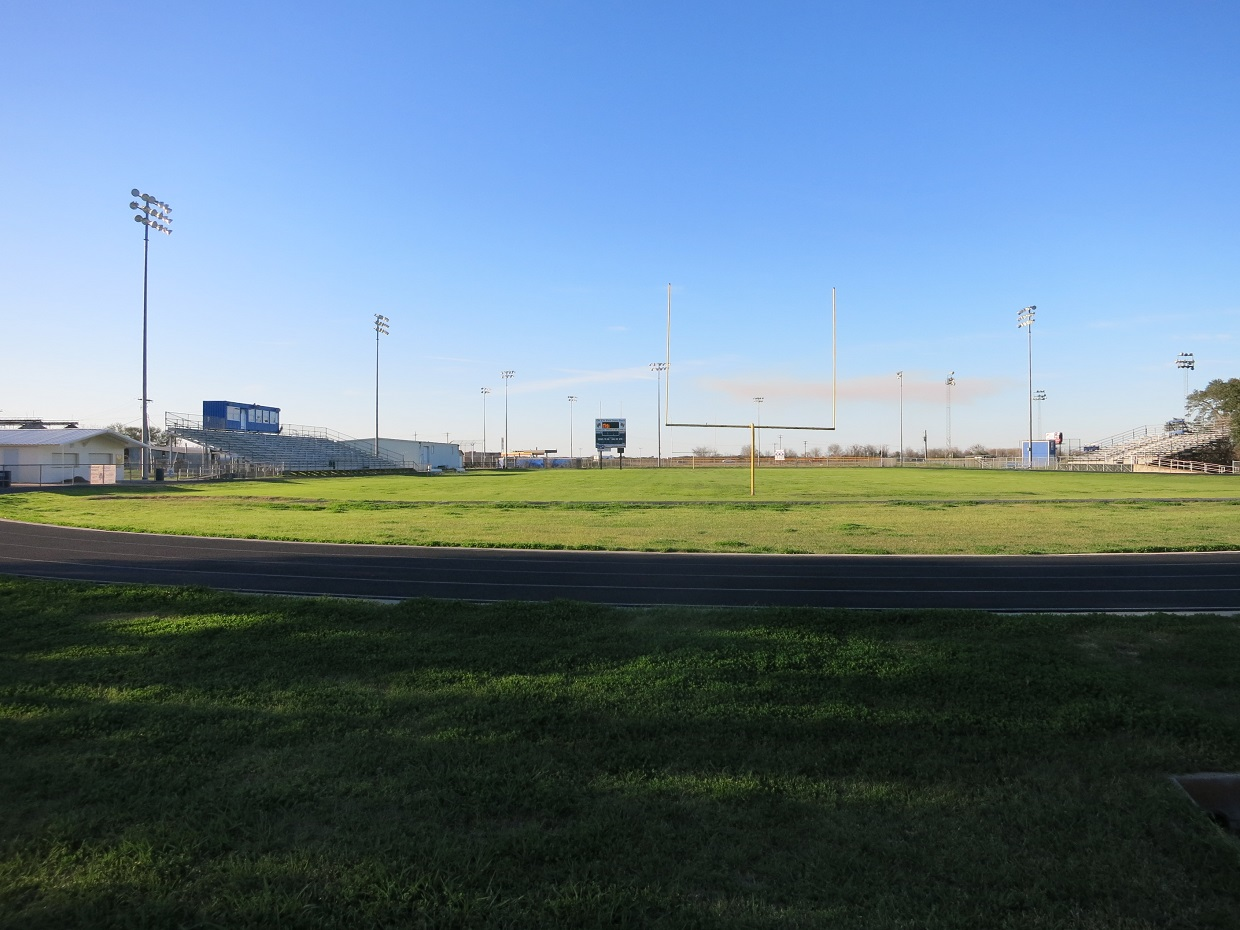
Football stadium and track

== Marching Band ==
The Louise High School "Hornet Legion" is under the direction of Director of Bands, Adam E. Ardner, and Associate Director Meagan Stephens. The Hornet Legion has appeared three times at the UIL State Marching Band Championships.

Appearances: 2023, 2024, 2025

Finals: N/A

Medals: N/A
