= California Baptist Lancers baseball =

American intercollegiate baseball team

California Baptist Lancers
- 2026 California Baptist Lancers baseball team
- Overall record: 213–146
- University: California Baptist University
- Head coach: Gary Adcock (23rd season)
- Conference: Big West Conference
- Location: Riverside, California
- Home stadium: James W. Totman Stadium (capacity: 800)
- Nickname: Lancers
- Colors: Navy blue and gold

NCAA tournament appearances
- Division II: 2014, 2015, 2016, 2017, 2018

Conference regular season champions
- 2019, 2021

The California Baptist Lancers baseball team represents California Baptist University, which is located in Riverside, California. The Lancers are an NCAA Division I college baseball program that competes in the Big West Conference. They began competing in Division I in 2019 and joined the Western Athletic Conference the same season.

The Cal Baptist Lancers play home games on campus at James W. Totman Stadium. Under the direction of Head Coach Gary Adcock, the Lancers transitioned from Division II to Division I and were not eligible for postseason play. In their first season in the WAC, they tied for the regular season title. They repeated their shared title in 2021 and first competed in the WAC's postseason tournament in 2023. In the program's seven years in Division II, the Lancers played in five NCAA tournaments.

Since the program's inception, two Lancers have later played in Major League Baseball (MLB), Trevor Oaks and Tyson Miller. Since 1981, 42 other Lancers have been drafted in the MLB draft.

== Conference membership history (Division I only) ==
- 2019–present: Western Athletic Conference

== James W. Totman Stadium ==
James W. Totman Stadium is a baseball stadium on the California Baptist campus in Riverside, California that seats 800 people. It opened in 1991 and was renovated in 2007.

== Head coaches (Division I only) ==
Records taken from the 2025 Complete History Book

Season	Coach	Years	Record	Pct.
2019–present	Gary Adcock	7	213–146	.593
Totals	1 coach	7 seasons	213–146	.593

== Year-by-year NCAA Division I results ==
Records taken from the 2025 CBU complete history book

Record table
Season	Coach	Overall	Conference	Standing	Postseason
Western Athletic Conference (2019–present)
2019	Gary Adcock	35–20	19–8	T–1st	ineligible
2020	Gary Adcock	7–8			Season cancelled on March 18 due to COVID-19 pandemic
2021	Gary Adcock	40–16	19–8	T–1st	ineligible
2022	Gary Adcock	36–20	18–12	2nd (West)	
2023	Gary Adcock	28–30	15–15	8th	WAC Tournament
2024	Gary Adcock	37–25	18–12	4th	WAC Tournament
2025	Gary Adcock	30–27	12–12	5th	WAC Tournament
Total:		213–146			
National champion Postseason invitational champion Conference regular season champion Conference regular season and conference tournament champion Division regular season champion Division regular season and conference tournament champion Conference tournament champion

== Awards and honors (Division I only) ==
- In their first season in the Western Athletic Conference, two Lancers were named to the all-conference first-team.

=== Freshman First-Team All-Americans ===
Year	Position	Name	Selector
2019	OF	Chad Castillo	CB
2021	Pitcher	CJ Culpepper	CB, NCBWA
2024	Pitcher	Lukas Pirko	D1Baseball.com

=== First-Team All-Americans ===
Year	Position	Name	Selector
2022	IF	Harrison Spohn	CB

=== Western Athletic Conference Freshman of the Year ===
Year	Position	Name
2021	Pitcher	CJ Culpepper
2025	SS	Chris Ramirez

=== Western Athletic Conference Pitcher of the Year ===
Year	Handedness	Name
2019	Right	Logan Rinehart, Jr.
2023	Right	Liam Rocha

=== Western Athletic Conference Player of the Year ===
Year	Position	Name
2021	OF	Damon Keith
2025	OF	Nicholas Dumesnil

Taken from the 2025 CBU complete history book. Updated February 27, 2020.

== Lancers in the Major Leagues ==
= All-Star	= Baseball Hall of Famer

Athlete	Years in MLB	MLB teams
Trevor Oaks	2018	Kansas City Royals
Tyson Miller	2020, 2022–2024	Chicago Cubs, Texas Rangers, Milwaukee Brewers, Los Angeles Dodgers, New York Mets, Seattle Mariners

Source: Baseball Reference

== See also ==
- List of NCAA Division I baseball programs
