= List of Delta Sigma Pi chapters =

Delta Sigma Pi is an American professional business fraternity for men and women. It was founded in 1907 at the School of Commerce, Accounts and Finance of New York University in New York City, New York. The fraternity has both collegiate and alumni chapters. It refers to chapters under development, traditionally known as colonies, as startup groups.

Collegiate chapter designations are assigned using the letters of the Greek alphabet in the following order: single letters in order from Alpha to Omega, shifting to double letters from Alpha Beta to Alpha Omega, Beta Gamma to Beta Omega, Delta Gamma to Delta Omega, etc. Once the chapter names reached Omega Psi, the system changes to run in reverse from Omega Psi to Omega Alpha and then to the previously skipped Psi Chi to Psi Alpha, Chi Phi to Chi Alpha, etc. Doubled or repetitive letters, such as Alpha Alpha, are not used for chapter names.

== Alumni chapters ==
Following are the alumni chapters of Delta Sigma Pi, with active chapters indicated in bold and inactive chapters in italics.

Chapter	Location	Status	Ref.
Albany Upstate New York	Albany, New York	Active	
Angelo Concho Valley	San Angelo, Texas	Active	
Arlington Area Lone Star	Arlington, Texas	Active	
Atlanta	Atlanta, Georgia	Active	
Austin	Austin, Texas	Active	
Baton Rouge-Red Stick	Baton Rouge, Louisiana	Active	
Birmingham-Magic City	Birmingham, Alabama	Active	
Boston	Boston, Massachusetts	Active	
Chicago	Chicago, Illinois	Active	
Cincinnati	Cincinnati, Ohio	Active	
Cleveland-Akron	Cleveland, Ohio	Active	
Columbia	Columbia, South Carolina	Active	
Dallas Area	Dallas, Texas	Active	
DC Metro	Washington, D.C.	Active	
Denver	Denver, Colorado	Active	
Des Moines-Central Iowa	Des Moines, Iowa	Active	
Detroit-Motown	Detroit, Michigan	Active	
Fort Worth Cowtown	Fort Worth, Texas	Active	
Frederick	Frederick, Maryland	Active	
Fresno-CenCal	Fresno, California	Active	
Hartford Connecticut	Hartford, Connecticut	Active	
Hawaii	Hilo, Hawaii	Active	
Inland Empire	Riverside, California	Active	
Jacksonville	Jacksonville, Florida	Active	
Jersey City-New Jersey Area	Jersey City, New Jersey	Active	
Kansas City	Kansas City, Missouri	Active	
Lake Charles-Lagniappe	Lake Charles, Louisiana	Active	
Lincoln/Greater Nebraska	Lincoln, Nebraska	Active	
Los Angeles	Los Angeles, California	Active	
Louisville	Louisville, Kentucky	Active	
Memphis	Memphis, Tennessee	Active	
Milwaukee	Milwaukee, Wisconsin	Active	
New York City	New York City, New York	Active	
North Hollywood	Hollywood, Los Angeles, California	Active	
Oklahoma City Tornado Alley	Oklahoma City, Oklahoma	Active	
Orange County	Orange, California	Active	
Pensacola	Pensacola, Florida	Active	
Phoenix-Thunderbird	Phoenix, Arizona	Active	
Reno Sierra Nevada	Reno, Nevada	Active	
Richmond	Richmond, Virginia	Active	
Sacramento Valley	Sacramento, California	Active	
San Antonio	San Antonio, Texas	Active	
San Francisco Bay Area	San Francisco, California	Active	
Sioux Falls/Greater South Dakota	Sioux Falls, South Dakota	Active	
Space City Houston	Houston, Texas	Active	
St Pete-Clearwater	St. Petersburg and Clearwater, Florida	Active	
St. Louis	St. Louis, Missouri	Active	
Twin Cities	Minneapolis, Minnesota	Active	

== Collegiate chapters ==
Following are the Delta Sigma Pi collegiate chapters with active chapters indicated in bold and inactive chapters in italics.

Chapter	Charter date and range	Institution	Location	Status	Ref.
Alpha	November 7, 1907 – xxxx ?; 2007–2017	New York University	New York City, New York	Inactive	
Beta	February 7, 1914 – 1977	Northwestern University, Chicago	Chicago, Illinois	Inactive	
**Gamma**	June 10, 1916 – 19xx ?; 1965–1969; 1988–xxxx ?; 2007	Boston University	Boston, Massachusetts	Active	(Note: Chapter was revived in 1988 by absorbing Gamma Omega Alpha (local), established in 1987.)
**Delta**	May 1, 1920	Marquette University	Milwaukee, Wisconsin	Active	
**Epsilon**	May 11, 1920	University of Iowa	Iowa City, Iowa	Active	
**Zeta**	November 14, 1920 – 1967; 2005	Northwestern University	Evanston, Illinois	Active	
Eta	November 27, 1920 – 1969	University of Kentucky	Lexington, Kentucky	Inactive	(Note: Chapter formed from Phi Chi (local), established in 1920.)
Theta	October 7, 1921 – 1969	University of Detroit	Detroit, Michigan	Inactive	
**Iota**	March 20, 1921 – 1975; 1986	University of Kansas	Lawrence, Kansas	Active	(Note: Chapter formed from Pi Sigma Delta, established in 1920.)
Kappa (First)	March 12, 1921 – 1933	Georgia School of Technology	Atlanta, Georgia	Moved	
**Lambda**	May 13, 1921 – 19xx ?; 1955	University of Pittsburgh	Pittsburgh, Pennsylvania	Active	
Mu	June 8, 1921 – 2006	Georgetown University	Washington, D.C.	Inactive	(Note: Chapter formed from Alpha Tau Delta, established in 1920.)
**Nu**	December 4, 1921	Ohio State University	Columbus, Ohio	Active	(Note: Chapter formed from Delta Sigma, established in 1920.)
**Xi**	December 11, 1921	University of Michigan	Ann Arbor, Michigan	Active	(Note: Chapter formed from the Delta Sig Club, established in 1921.)
**Omicron**	January 29, 1922 – 1931; November 10, 2018	Vanderbilt University	Nashville, Tennessee	Active	
**Pi**	February 18, 1922	University of Georgia	Athens, Georgia	Active	
Rho	March 12, 1922 – 2019	University of California, Berkeley	Berkeley, California	Inactive	
Sigma	April 16, 1922 – 1980	University of Utah	Salt Lake City, Utah	Inactive	
Tau	April 8, 1922 – 1932	McGill University	Montreal, Quebec, Canada	Inactive	(Note: Chapter formed from Delta Sigma, established in 1922.)
**Upsilon**	April 19, 1922	University of Illinois Urbana-Champaign	Champaign, Illinois	Active	(Note: Chapter formed from the Mercantile Club (local), established in 1920)
Phi	May 13, 1922 – 2019	University of Southern California	Los Angeles, California	Inactive	(Note: Chapter formed from Pi Sigma Delta, established in 1921.)
Chi (First) (see **Gamma Sigma**)	December 9, 1922 – 1926	University of Maryland	College Park, Maryland	Moved	
**Psi**	February 10, 1923 – 1994; 2010	University of Wisconsin–Madison	Madison, Wisconsin	Active	(Note: Chapter formed from Alpha Pi Delta, established in 1920.)
Omega	February 17, 1923 – 2004	Temple University	Philadelphia, Pennsylvania	Inactive	(Note: Chapter formed from the Seneca Club (local), established in 1921.)
**Alpha Beta**	March 24, 1923	University of Missouri	Columbia, Missouri	Active	(Note: Chapter formed from the Delta Sigma Club, established in 1922.)
**Alpha Gamma**	April 21, 1923	Pennsylvania State University	State College, Pennsylvania	Active	(Note: Chapter formed from Phi Sigma Beta, established in 1921.)
**Alpha Delta**	March 1, 1924	University of Nebraska–Lincoln	Lincoln, Nebraska	Active	(Note: Chapter formed from the Delta Sigma Club, established in 1923.)
**Alpha Epsilon**	March 8, 1924	University of Minnesota	Minneapolis, Minnesota	Active	
**Alpha Zeta**	May 2, 1924	University of Tennessee	Knoxville, Tennessee	Active	
**Alpha Eta**	April 5, 1924	University of South Dakota	Vermillion, South Dakota	Active	
**Alpha Theta**	May 3, 1924	University of Cincinnati	Cincinnati, Ohio	Active	
**Alpha Iota**	May 17, 1924	Drake University	Des Moines, Iowa	Active	(Note: Chapter formed from Alpha Kappa Tau, established in 1920.)
**Alpha Kappa**	May 9, 1925	University at Buffalo	Buffalo, New York	Active	(Note: Chapter formed from Delta Gamma Nu, established in 1923.)
**Alpha Lambda**	May 9, 1925	University of North Carolina at Chapel Hill	Chapel Hill, North Carolina	Active	(Note: Chapter formed from the Hansard Club, established in 1925.)
Alpha Mu	May 17, 1925 – 1975	University of North Dakota	Grand Forks, North Dakota	Inactive	(Note: Chapter formed from the Delta Sigma Club, established in 1924)
**Alpha Nu**	October 10, 1925 – 1990; 2005	University of Denver	Denver, Colorado	Active	
**Alpha Xi**	October 24, 1925 – 1971; 2022	University of Virginia	Charlottesville, Virginia	Active	
**Alpha Omicron**	December 15, 1925	Ohio University	Athens, Ohio	Active	(Note: Chapter formed from Pi Gamma Epsilon, established in 1923.)
**Alpha Pi**	December 19, 1925	Indiana University Bloomington	Bloomington, Indiana	Active	(Note: Chapter formed from Delta Sigma, established in 1924.)
Chi (Second)	1926 – 2013	Johns Hopkins University	Baltimore, Maryland	Inactive	
**Alpha Rho**	February 21, 1926	University of Colorado Boulder	Boulder, Colorado	Active	(Note: Chapter formed from Beta Sigma Theta, established in 1924.)
**Alpha Sigma**	March 6, 1926	University of Alabama	Tuscaloosa, Alabama	Active	(Note: Chapter formed from Sigma Pi Kappa, established in 1926.)
**Alpha Tau**	March 26, 1927	Mercer University	Macon, Georgia	Active	(Note: Chapter formed from Alpha Lambda Epsilon, established in 1925.)
**Alpha Upsilon**	April 16, 1927	Miami University	Oxford, Ohio	Active	(Note: Chapter formed from Gamma Delta Nu, established in 1925.)
Alpha Phi	April 30, 1927 – 2003	University of Mississippi	Oxford, Mississippi	Inactive	(Note: Chapter formed from Sigma Delta, established in 1926.)
**Alpha Chi**	February 18, 1928 – 19xx ?; 1992	Washington University in St. Louis	St. Louis, Missouri	Active	(Note: Chapter formed from Delta Sigma, established in 1927.)
**Alpha Psi**	April 22, 1928 – 1947; 2019	University of Chicago	Chicago, Illinois	Active	(Note: Chapter formed from the Professional Commerce Club, established in 1927.)
**Alpha Omega**	June 2, 1928 – 19xx ?; 2000	DePaul University	Chicago, Illinois	Active	(Note: Chapter formed from Tau Delta Rho, established in 1921.)
**Beta Gamma**	April 13, 1929	University of South Carolina	Columbia, South Carolina	Active	(Note: Chapter formed from the Commerce Club, established in 1926.)
Beta Delta	May 22, 1929 – 1939	North Carolina State University	Raleigh, North Carolina	Inactive	(Note: Chapter formed from Pi Delta Sigma, established in 1927.)
**Beta Epsilon**	December 4, 1929	University of Oklahoma	Norman, Oklahoma	Active	(Note: Chapter formed from Delta Sigma, established in 1928.)
**Beta Zeta**	December 7, 1929	Louisiana State University	Baton Rouge, Louisiana	Active	(Note: Chapter formed from Beta Tau Alpha, established in 1929.)
**Beta Eta**	December 14, 1929	University of Florida	Gainesville, Florida	Active	(Note: Chapter formed from Omega Delta, established in 1927.)
Beta Theta	May 24, 1930 – 1976	Creighton University	Omaha, Nebraska	Inactive	(Note: Chapter formed from Kappa Pi Delta, established in 1924.)
**Beta Iota**	December 6, 1930	Baylor University	Waco, Texas	Active	(Note: Chapter formed from Pi Delta Sigma, established in 1927.)
**Beta Kappa**	March 18, 1930 – 1995; 2000	University of Texas at Austin	Austin, Texas	Active	(Note: Chapter formed from Pi Sigma Delta, established in 1928.)
**Beta Lambda**	March 21, 1931	Auburn University	Auburn, Alabama	Active	(Note: Chapter formed from Beta Alpha Sigma, established in 1928.)
Beta Mu	May 2, 1931 – 1938	Dalhousie University	Halifax, Nova Scotia, Canada	Inactive	(Note: Chapter formed from Zeta Kappa Phi, established in 1928.)
**Beta Nu**	January 23, 1932 – 196x ?; 1987	University of Pennsylvania	Philadelphia, Pennsylvania	Active	(Note: Chapter formed from Tau Delta Kappa, established in 1925.)
**Kappa (Second)**	1933	Georgia State University	Atlanta, Georgia	Active	
**Beta Xi**	May 19, 1934	Rider University	Lawrenceville, New Jersey	Active	(Note: Chapter formed from Chi Delta Mu, established in 1930.)
**Beta Omicron**	October 9, 1937 – 1973; 2019	Rutgers University–Newark	Newark, New Jersey	Active	(Note: Chapter formed from Phi Sigma Beta, established in 1931.)
**Beta Pi**	May 16, 1942	Kent State University	Kent, Ohio	Active	(Note: Chapter formed from Delta Kappa Psi, established in 1938.)
Beta Rho	May 23, 1942 – 1948	Rutgers University–Newark	Newark, New Jersey	Inactive	(Note: Chapter formed from Kappa Alpha Phi, established in 1935.)
**Beta Sigma**	June 1, 1946 – 1969; 2004	Saint Louis University	St. Louis, Missouri	Active	(Note: Chapter formed from Phi Sigma Eta, established in 1924.)
Beta Tau	October 18, 1947 – 1971	Case Western Reserve University	Cleveland, Ohio	Inactive	(Note: Chapter formed from Sigma Rho Delta, established in 1937.)
**Beta Upsilon**	October 25, 1947 – 19xx ?; 2001	Texas Tech University	Lubbock, Texas	Active	(Note: Chapter formed from the Cornucopia Society, established in 1946.)
**Beta Phi**	March 20, 1948	Southern Methodist University	Dallas, Texas	Active	(Note: Chapter formed from the Delta Commerce Club, established in 1947.)
Beta Chi	May 9, 1948 – 1995	University of Tulsa	Tulsa, Oklahoma	Inactive	(Note: Chapter formed from Alpha Beta Mu, established in 1947.)
**Beta Psi**	May 15, 1948	Louisiana Tech University	Ruston, Louisiana	Active	(Note: Chapter formed from Beta Alpha Epsilon, established in 1947.)
**Beta Omega**	December 11, 1948	University of Miami	Coral Gables, Florida	Active	(Note: Chapter formed from the University Business Club, established in 1948.)
Gamma Delta	March 5, 1949 – 1995	Mississippi State University	Starkville, Mississippi	Inactive	(Note: Chapter formed from Mu Sigma Chi, established in 1948.)
**Gamma Epsilon**	March 19, 1949	Oklahoma State University	Stillwater, Oklahoma	Active	(Note: Chapter formed from Beta Alpha, established in 1948.)
Gamma Zeta	April 9, 1949 – 1997	University of Memphis	Memphis, Tennessee	Inactive	(Note: Chapter formed from Sigma Delta, established in 1948.)
**Gamma Eta**	April 23, 1949 – 1978; 1995	University of Nebraska Omaha	Omaha, Nebraska	Active	(Note: Chapter formed from Delta Beta Phi, established in 1947.)
**Gamma Theta**	May 7, 1949	Wayne State University	Detroit, Michigan	Active	(Note: Chapter formed from Beta Alpha Sigma, established in 1948.)
**Gamma Iota**	May 14, 1949	University of New Mexico	Albuquerque, New Mexico	Active	(Note: Chapter formed from Pi Delta, established in 1948.)
**Gamma Kappa**	October 29, 1949 – 1973; 1995	Michigan State University	East Lansing, Michigan	Active	
**Gamma Lambda**	December 3, 1949	Florida State University	Tallahassee, Florida	Active	(Note: Chapter formed from Beta Gamma, established in 1948.)
**Gamma Mu**	December 4, 1949 – xxxx ?; 2015	Tulane University	New Orleans, Louisiana	Active	(Note: Chapter formed from Commerce Club, established in 1949.)
Gamma Nu	April 1, 1950 – 1973	Wake Forest University	Winston-Salem, North Carolina	Inactive	(Note: Chapter formed from Beta Tau, established in 1948.)
**Gamma Xi**	May 13, 1950 – 1972; 2002	Santa Clara University	Santa Clara, California	Active	
Gamma Omicron	September 16, 1950 – 2018	University of San Francisco	San Francisco, California	Inactive	(Note: Chapter formed from the Business Administration Club, established in 1949.)
**Gamma Pi**	September 30, 1950	Loyola University Chicago	Chicago, Illinois	Active	
Gamma Rho	October 7, 1950 – 1987	University of Detroit	Detroit, Michigan	Inactive	(Note: Chapter formed from Delta Iota, established in 1949.)
Gamma Rho	October 7, 1950 – 1987	University of Detroit Night School	Detroit, Michigan	Inactive	(Note: Chapter formed from Delta Iota, established in 1949.)
**Gamma Sigma** (see Chi First)	November 18, 1950 – 2004; 2014	University of Maryland, College Park	College Park, Maryland	Active	(Note: Chapter formed from the Professional Business Club, established in 1949. After going inactive, the chapter was reformed from Alpha Tau Omega (local), established in 2013.)
**Gamma Tau**	December 9, 1950 –19xx ?; 2002	University of Southern Mississippi	Hattiesburg, Mississippi	Active	(Note: Chapter formed from Beta Alpha, established in 1949.)
**Gamma Upsilon**	April 21, 1951 – 1981; 2013	Babson College	Wellesley, Massachusetts	Active	(Note: Chapter formed from Alpha Chi Epsilon, established in 1948.)
**Gamma Phi**	May 19, 1951	University of Texas at El Paso	El Paso, Texas	Active	(Note: Chapter formed from Beta Alpha Epsilon, established in 1945.)
Gamma Chi	May 26, 1951 – 1954	St. Bonaventure University	St. Bonaventure, New York	Inactive	(Note: Chapter formed from Beta Beta Chi, established in 1935.)
**Gamma Psi**	November 3, 1951	University of Arizona	Tucson, Arizona	Active	(Note: Chapter formed from the Commerce Club (local), established in 1950.)
**Gamma Omega**	November 4, 1951	Arizona State University	Tempe, Arizona	Active	(Note: Chapter formed from Delta Pi Omega, established in 1950.)
**Delta Epsilon**	May 15, 1954	University of North Texas	Denton, Texas	Active	(Note: Chapter formed from Phi Sigma Chi, established in 1953.)
Delta Zeta	May 19, 1955 – 1972	East Carolina University	Greenville, North Carolina	Inactive	
Delta Eta	April 14, 1956 – 1998	Lamar University	Beaumont, Texas	Inactive	(Note: Chapter formed from Lambda Sigma Chi, established in 1955.)
Delta Theta	May 19, 1956 – 1984	Oklahoma City University	Oklahoma City, Oklahoma	Inactive	(Note: Chapter formed from Delta Kappa, established in 1954.)
**Delta Iota**	April 27, 1957	Florida Southern College	Lakeland, Florida	Active	(Note: Chapter formed from Beta Sigma, established in 1956.)
Delta Kappa	May 4, 1957 – 1976	Boston College	Chestnut Hill, Massachusetts	Inactive	(Note: Chapter formed from Delta, established in 1955.)
Delta Lambda	May 5, 1957 – 1972	Ithaca College	Ithaca, New York	Inactive	(Note: Chapter formed from Delta Nu Omega, established in 1956.)
Delta Mu	March 8, 1958 – 1976	University of the Americas	Puebla City, Puebla, Mexico	Inactive	(Note: Chapter formed from Delta Lambda Upsilon, established in 1957.)
**Delta Nu**	May 3, 1958	Loyola University New Orleans	New Orleans, Louisiana	Active	(Note: Chapter formed from Business Club, established in 1957.)
Delta Xi	May 17, 1958 – 2008	East Tennessee State University	Johnson City, Tennessee	Inactive	(Note: Chapter formed from Phi Beta Chi, established in 1957.)
**Delta Omicron**	April 4, 1959	San Francisco State University	San Francisco, California	Active	(Note: Chapter formed from Delta Sigma, established in 1958.)
**Delta Pi**	April 11, 1959 – 19xx ?; 1976	University of Nevada, Reno	Reno, Nevada	Active	(Note: Chapter formed from Beta Alpha Nu, established in 1958.)
Delta Rho	May 16, 1959 – 2021	Ferris State University	Big Rapids, Michigan	Inactive	(Note: Chapter formed from Sigma Pi, established in 1957.)
**Delta Sigma**	June 6, 1959	Loyola Marymount University	Los Angeles, California	Active	(Note: Chapter formed from Lambda Upsilon, established in 1958.)
**Delta Tau**	October 10, 1959	Indiana State University	Terre Haute, Indiana	Active	(Note: Chapter formed from Beta Iota Sigma, established in 1958.)
**Delta Upsilon**	October 18, 1959	Texas Christian University	Fort Worth, Texas	Active	(Note: Chapter formed from C. of C.)
Delta Phi	February 27, 1960 – 1987	East Texas A&M University	Commerce, Texas	Inactive	(Note: Chapter formed from Beta Epsilon Tau, established in 1959.)
Delta Chi	March 12, 1960 – 1989; 1994–1999	Washburn University	Topeka, Kansas	Inactive	(Note: Chapter formed from Sigma Pi, established in 1958.)
Delta Psi	May 15, 1960 – 1989	Suffolk University	Boston, Massachusetts	Inactive	(Note: Chapter formed from Delta Sigma, established in 1959.)
Delta Omega	May 21, 1960 – 2001	West Liberty University	West Liberty, West Virginia	Inactive	(Note: Chapter formed from the Business Club (local), established in 1959.)
**Epsilon Zeta**	October 15, 1960 – 1975; 2008	Midwestern State University	Wichita Falls, Texas	Active	
Epsilon Eta	October 22, 1960 – 1987	Eastern New Mexico University	Portales, New Mexico	Inactive	(Note: Chapter formed from Beta Alpha Epsilon, established in 1960.)
**Epsilon Theta**	December 3, 1960	California State University, Chico	Chico, California	Active	(Note: Chapter formed from Alpha Beta Pi, established in 1959.)
**Epsilon Iota**	December 10, 1960	Minnesota State University, Mankato	Mankato, Minnesota	Active	(Note: Chapter formed from Delta Sigma Tau, established in 1960.)
**Epsilon Kappa**	February 18, 1961	Shepherd University	Shepherdstown, West Virginia	Active	(Note: Chapter formed from Sigma Beta Chi, established in 1960.)
**Epsilon Lambda**	March 23, 1961 – 1984; 2012	Rochester Institute of Technology	Rochester, New York	Active	(Note: Chapter formed from Sigma Beta Rho, established in 1960.)
Epsilon Mu	April 14, 1962 – 1976	Sam Houston State University	Huntsville, Texas	Inactive	(Note: Chapter formed from Delta Sigma, established in 1961.)
Epsilon Nu	April 15, 1962 – 1997	University of New Orleans	New Orleans, Louisiana	Inactive	(Note: Chapter formed from Mu Chi Sigma, established in 1959.)
**Epsilon Xi**	April 28, 1962	Ball State University	Muncie, Indiana	Active	(Note: Chapter formed from Beta Alpha Pi, established in 1961.)
**Epsilon Omicron**	1962–1971, 1990	Western Michigan University	Kalamazoo, Michigan	Active	(Note: Chapter formed from Phi Beta Alpha, established in 1961.)
Epsilon Pi	1962–1972	Monmouth University	West Long Branch, New Jersey	Inactive	(Note: Chapter formed from Delta Sigma Beta, established in 1961.)
**Epsilon Rho**	1963	University of Tampa	Tampa, Florida	Active	(Note: Chapter formed from Business Club, established in 1961.)
**Epsilon Sigma**	1963–1993, 2013	La Salle University	Philadelphia, Pennsylvania	Active	(Note: Chapter was reformed in 2013 from Lambda Sigma Beta, established in 2011.)
**Epsilon Tau**	1963	University of Dayton	Dayton, Ohio	Active	(Note: Chapter formed from Theta Pi Beta, established in 1961.)
**Epsilon Upsilon**	1963	New Mexico State University	Las Cruces, New Mexico	Active	(Note: Chapter formed from Nu Mu Sigma, established in 1961.)
**Epsilon Phi**	1963–1992, 1998	California State University, Sacramento	Sacramento, California	Active	(Note: Chapter formed from Delta Sigma Chi, established in 1960.)
**Epsilon Chi**	1963	Georgia Southern University	Statesboro, Georgia	Active	(Note: Chapter formed from Beta Alpha Sigma, established in 1962.)
**Epsilon Psi**	1964	Christian Brothers University	Memphis, Tennessee	Active	(Note: Chapter formed from Commerce Club, established in 1954.)
**Epsilon Omega**	1964	Eastern Illinois University	Charleston, Illinois	Active	(Note: Chapter formed from Phi Beta Mu, established in 1963.)
**Zeta Eta**	1964	Saint Peter's University	Jersey City, New Jersey	Active	(Note: Chapter formed from Sigma Pi Beta, established in 1963.)
**Zeta Theta**	1964	Western Kentucky University	Bowling Green, Kentucky	Active	(Note: Chapter formed from Beta Gamma Kappa, established in 1963.)
Zeta Iota	1964–1997	Mississippi College	Clinton, Mississippi	Inactive	(Note: Chapter formed from Business & Economics Club, established in 1961.)
Zeta Kappa	1965–2008	Western State Colorado University	Gunnison, Colorado	Inactive	(Note: Chapter formed from Business Club, established in 1964.)
**Zeta Lambda**	1965	Georgia Tech	Atlanta, Georgia	Active	(Note: Chapter was reformed in 2016 from Gamma Iota Tau, established in 2015.)
**Zeta Mu**	1965	University of Texas at Arlington	Arlington, Texas	Active	(Note: Chapter formed from Business Professionals Club, established in 1957.)
**Zeta Nu**	1965	Texas A&M University–Kingsville	Kingsville, Texas	Active	
**Zeta Xi**	1965	Lewis University	Romeoville, Illinois	Active	(Note: Chapter formed from the Commerce Club, established in 1961.)
Zeta Omicron	1965–1995	LIU Post	Brookville, New York	Inactive	(Note: Chapter formed from Beta Alpha Pi, established in 1964.)
**Zeta Pi**	1965	Saint Joseph's University	Philadelphia, Pennsylvania	Active	(Note: Chapter formed from Sigma Iota.)
Zeta Rho	1966–1994	Menlo College	Menlo Park, California	Inactive	(Note: Chapter formed from Beta Sigma Mu, established in 1964.)
Zeta Sigma	1966–1985	Southeastern Louisiana University	Hammond, Louisiana	Inactive	(Note: Chapter formed from Sigma Epsilon, established in 1965.)
**Zeta Tau**	1966–19xx ?, 2006	California State University, East Bay	Hayward, California	Active	(Note: Chapter formed from Delta Sigma Tau, established in 1965.)
**Zeta Upsilon**	1966	Virginia Tech	Blacksburg, Virginia	Active	(Note: Chapter formed from the Business Administration Society, established in 1965.)
**Zeta Phi**	1966–1990, 1992	Florida Atlantic University	Boca Raton, Florida	Active	(Note: Chapter formed from the Business Club, established in 1966.)
Zeta Chi	1966–1972	Manhattan University	Bronx, New York	Inactive	(Note: Chapter formed from Beta Alpha Mu, established in 1965.)
**Zeta Psi**	1967	University at Albany, SUNY	Albany, New York	Active	(Note: Chapter formed from Alpha Sigma Upsilon, established in 1966.)
**Zeta Omega**	1967	Northern Arizona University	Flagstaff, Arizona	Active	(Note: Chapter formed from Beta Alpha Nu, established in 1966.)
**Eta Theta**	1967	Angelo State University	San Angelo, Texas	Active	(Note: Chapter formed from Alpha Sigma Chi, established in 1966.)
Eta Iota	1967–2008	Nicholls State University	Thibodaux, Louisiana	Inactive	
**Eta Kappa**	1968	Troy University	Troy, Alabama	Active	(Note: Chapter formed from Tau Sigma Chi Eta, established in 1966.)
Eta Lambda	1968–1983	Weber State University	Ogden, Utah	Inactive	(Note: Chapter formed from Business Association, established in 1967.)
**Eta Mu**	1968	Northern Illinois University	DeKalb, Illinois	Active	(Note: Chapter formed from Nu Iota, established in 1967.)
Eta Nu	1968–1974, 1983	University of Missouri–St. Louis	St. Louis, Missouri	Inactive	(Note: Chapter formed from Delta Sigma Chi, established in 1967. After going inactive, it reformed in 1983 from Mu Sigma Lambda, established in 1982.)
Eta Xi	1968–2022	Thomas Jefferson University, East Falls	Philadelphia, Pennsylvania	Inactive	(Note: Chapter formed from Beta Alpha Tau, established in 1967 at the Philadelphia College of Textiles & Science, now Thomas Jefferson University.)
Eta Omicron	1968–1995	University of Louisiana at Monroe	Monroe, Louisiana	Inactive	(Note: Chapter formed from Beta Alpha Nu, established in 1968.)
**Eta Pi**	1969	Wayne State College	Wayne, Nebraska	Active	(Note: Chapter formed from Beta Sigma Epsilon, established in 1968.)
**Eta Rho**	1969	University of Wisconsin–La Crosse	La Crosse, Wisconsin	Active	(Note: Chapter formed from Beta Alpha Epsilon, established in 1967.)
Eta Sigma	1969–1986, 2010	Southern Illinois University Edwardsville	Edwardsville, Illinois	Inactive	(Note: Chapter formed from Delta Sigma Psi, established in 1968.)
**Eta Tau**	1969	McNeese State University	Lake Charles, Louisiana	Active	(Note: Chapter formed from Beta Alpha Mu, established in 1968.)
**Eta Upsilon**	1969	University of West Florida	Pensacola, Florida	Active	(Note: Chapter formed from Alpha Beta Alpha, established in 1968.)
Eta Phi	1969–1985	Eastern Michigan University	Ypsilanti, Michigan	Inactive	(Note: Chapter formed from Eta Delta, established in 1968.)
**Eta Chi**	1969–1989, 2001–2012, 2018	California State Polytechnic University, Pomona	Pomona, California	Active	(Note: Chapter formed from Delta Sigma, established in 1968.)
**Eta Psi**	1970	University of Houston	Houston, Texas	Active	(Note: Chapter formed from Delta Sigma, established in 1969.)
Eta Omega	1970–2012	Virginia Commonwealth University	Richmond, Virginia	Inactive	(Note: Chapter formed from Sigma Omega Beta, established in 1968.)
**Theta Iota**	1970	University of Connecticut	Storrs, Connecticut	Active	(Note: Chapter formed from the Executives Club, established in 1969.)
**Theta Kappa**	1970	University of Akron	Akron, Ohio	Active	(Note: Chapter formed from Beta Alpha, established in 1968.)
**Theta Lambda**	1970	Xavier University	Cincinnati, Ohio	Active	(Note: Chapter formed from Beta Alpha Chi, established in 1969.)
Theta Mu	1970–1985	Columbus State University	Columbus, Georgia	Inactive	(Note: Chapter formed from Delta Sigma Epsilon, established in 1968.)
Theta Nu	1970–1976	University of Arkansas	Fayetteville, Arkansas	Inactive	(Note: Chapter formed from Alpha Beta Alpha, established in 1969.)
Theta Xi	1970–1994	University of Wisconsin–Whitewater	Whitewater, Wisconsin	Inactive	(Note: Chapter formed from Sigma Beta Epsilon, established in 1969.)
Theta Omicron	1970–2000	St. Ambrose University	Davenport, Iowa	Inactive	(Note: Chapter formed from Chi Sigma Alpha, established in 1968.)
**Theta Pi**	1970	Bowling Green State University	Bowling Green, Ohio	Active	
**Theta Rho**	1970	Duquesne University	Pittsburgh, Pennsylvania	Active	(Note: Chapter formed from Delta Beta Alpha, established in 1969.)
**Theta Sigma**	1970	University of Central Florida	Orlando, Florida	Active	(Note: Chapter formed from Chi Beta Alpha, established in 1969.)
**Theta Tau**	1970	St. Cloud State University	St. Cloud, Minnesota	Active	(Note: Chapter formed from Sigma Chi Sigma, established in 1969.)
**Theta Upsilon**	1971	Siena College	Loudonville, New York	Active	(Note: Chapter formed from Sigma Beta Sigma, established in 1948.)
**Theta Phi**	1971	University of South Florida	Tampa, Florida	Active	(Note: Chapter formed from Sigma Beta Sigma, established in 1948.)
**Theta Chi**	1971	San Jose State University	San Jose, California	Active	(Note: Chapter formed from Sigma Chi Sigma, established in 1970.)
Theta Psi	1971–2000	Indiana University Northwest	Gary, Indiana	Inactive	(Note: Chapter formed from Sigma Beta Epsilon, established in 1970.)
**Theta Omega**	1972–1957, 1980	St. Edward's University	Austin, Texas	Active	(Note: Chapter formed from Sigma Eta Tau, established in 1971.)
Iota Kappa	1974–2018	James Madison University	Harrisonburg, Virginia	Inactive	(Note: Chapter formed from Beta Upsilon Sigma, established in 1973.)
Iota Lambda	1977–2019	Purdue University Fort Wayne	Fort Wayne, Indiana	Inactive	(Note: Chapter formed from Iota Lambda Phi, established in 1976.)
**Iota Mu**	1977–1988, 2002	Georgia College & State University	Milledgeville, Georgia	Active	(Note: Chapter formed from Alpha Omega, established in 1973.)
**Iota Nu**	1978	Truman State University	Kirksville, Missouri	Active	(Note: Chapter formed from Beta Alpha Nu, established in 1977.)
Iota Xi	1979–1987	Winston-Salem State University	Winston-Salem, North Carolina	Inactive	(Note: Chapter formed from Beta Alpha Omicron, established in 1978.)
**Iota Omicron**	1979	University of Central Missouri	Warrensburg, Missouri	Active	(Note: Chapter formed from Chi Mu Sigma, established in 1978.)
**Iota Pi**	1979	San Diego State University	San Diego, California	Active	(Note: Chapter formed from Sigma Delta, established in 1978.)
**Iota Rho**	1980	Howard University	Washington, D.C.	Active	(Note: Chapter formed from the Professional Business Fraternity, established in 1979.)
Iota Sigma	1980–2022	University of Evansville	Evansville, Indiana	Inactive	(Note: Chapter formed from Beta Alpha Epsilon, established in 1977.)
Iota Tau	1980–1989	Robert Morris University	Moon Township, Pennsylvania	Inactive	(Note: Chapter formed from Rho Mu Chi, established in 1971.)
**Iota Upsilon**	1980	California State University, Northridge	Northridge, Los Angeles, California	Active	(Note: Chapter formed from Chi Sigma Nu, established in 1978.)
**Iota Phi**	1980	California State University, Fresno	Fresno, California	Active	(Note: Chapter formed from Delta Sigma, established in 1979.)
**Iota Chi**	1980	Illinois State University	Normal, Illinois	Active	(Note: Chapter formed from Eta Delta Gamma, established in 1979.)
Iota Psi	1981–2018	Texas A&M University–Corpus Christi	Corpus Christi, Texas	Inactive	(Note: Chapter formed from Phi Chi Psi.)
**Iota Omega**	1981	University of North Carolina at Greensboro	Greensboro, North Carolina	Active	(Note: Chapter formed from Gamma Beta Epsilon, established in 1980.)
**Kappa Lambda**	1981	Binghamton University	Binghamton, New York	Active	(Note: Chapter formed from Sigma Mu Beta, established in 1980.)
**Kappa Mu**	1981	California Polytechnic State University	San Luis Obispo, California	Active	(Note: Chapter formed from Sigma Lambda Omega, established in 1980.)
**Kappa Nu**	1981	Longwood University	Farmville, Virginia	Active	(Note: Chapter formed from Lambda Chi, established in 1981.)
**Kappa Xi**	1981	University of Louisiana at Lafayette	Lafayette, Louisiana	Active	(Note: Chapter formed from Chi Omega Chi, established in 1980.)
**Kappa Omicron**	1981	Missouri State University	Springfield, Missouri	Active	(Note: Chapter formed from Sigma Mu Sigma, established in 1980.)
**Kappa Pi**	1981	University of North Florida	Jacksonville, Florida	Active	(Note: Chapter formed from Delta Pi Kappa Pi, established in 1981.)
**Kappa Rho**	1982–1995, 2009	Adelphi University	Garden City, New York	Active	(Note: Chapter formed from Beta Alpha Upsilon, established in 1981.)
**Kappa Sigma**	1982	Indiana University Indianapolis	Indianapolis, Indiana	Active	(Note: Chapter formed from Alpha Psi Omega, established in 1981 at the Indiana University–Purdue University Indianapolis, which split into two institutions in 2024.)
**Kappa Tau**	1982	Clemson University	Clemson, South Carolina	Active	(Note: Chapter formed from Chi Delta Sigma, established in 1981.)
**Kappa Upsilon**	1983–2024	Winona State University	Winona, Minnesota	Inactive	(Note: Chapter formed from Psi Alpha Kappa, established in 1982.)
**Kappa Phi**	1983	Valparaiso University	Valparaiso, Indiana	Active	(Note: Chapter formed from Kappa Beta Alpha, established in 1982.)
**Kappa Chi**	1983–xxxx ?, 2012	Savannah State University	Savannah, Georgia	Active	(Note: Chapter formed from Sigma Sigma Chi, established in 1982.)
**Kappa Psi**	1983	Bellarmine University	Louisville, Kentucky	Active	(Note: Chapter formed from Alpha Beta Delta, established in 1982.)
**Kappa Omega**	1984	Purdue University	West Lafayette, Indiana	Active	(Note: Chapter formed from Alpha Beta Pi, established in 1983.)
**Lambda Mu**	1984	University of the Pacific	Stockton, California	Active	(Note: Chapter formed from Upsilon Pi, established in 1983.)
**Lambda Nu**	1985	Texas A&M University	College Station, Texas	Active	(Note: Chapter formed from Alpha Gamma Sigma, established in 1984.)
**Lambda Xi**	1986	Grand Valley State University	Allendale, Michigan	Active	(Note: Chapter formed from Gamma Phi Sigma, established in 1985.)
**Lambda Omicron**	1986	Western Illinois University	Macomb, Illinois	Active	(Note: Chapter formed from Chi Beta Lambda, established in 1985.)
**Lambda Pi**	1986	University of San Diego	San Diego, California	Active	(Note: Chapter formed from Beta Theta Beta, established in 1986.)
Lambda Rho	1986–1995, 2000–2013	University of West Alabama	Livingston, Alabama	Inactive	(Note: Chapter formed from Lambda Beta Alpha, established in 1986.)
**Lambda Sigma**	1986	California State University, Fullerton	Fullerton, California	Active	(Note: Chapter formed from Delta Sigma Beta, established in 1985.)
**Lambda Tau**	1987	Bentley University	Waltham, Massachusetts	Active	(Note: Chapter formed from Nu Epsilon Alpha, established in 1986.)
**Lambda Upsilon**	1988	St. Mary's University, Texas	San Antonio, Texas	Active	(Note: Chapter formed from Sigma Alpha Tau, established in 1987.)
**Lambda Phi**	1988	California State University, Long Beach	Long Beach, California	Active	(Note: Chapter formed from Alpha Theta Beta, established in 1987.)
Lambda Chi	1989–2020	University of California, Riverside	Riverside, California	Inactive	(Note: Chapter formed from Rho Beta Sigma, established in 1987.)
**Lambda Psi**	1989	University of Hawaii at Hilo	Hilo, Hawaii	Active	(Note: Chapter formed from Alpha Theta Kappa, established in 1987)
Lambda Omega	1989–1995	Quincy University	Quincy, Illinois	Inactive	(Note: Chapter formed from Delta Beta Theta, established in 1988)
Mu Nu	April 29, 1989 – 1994	University of Nevada, Las Vegas	Las Vegas, Nevada	Inactive	(Note: Chapter formed from Delta Beta Theta, established in 1988.)
Mu Xi	1990–1995	La Roche College	Pittsburgh, Pennsylvania	Inactive	(Note: Chapter formed from Omega Alpha, established in 1989.)
Mu Omicron	1990–2000	University of Houston–Victoria	Victoria, Texas	Inactive	(Note: Chapter formed from Sigma Omega Beta, established in 1989.)
**Mu Pi**	1991	Penn State Erie, The Behrend College	Erie, Pennsylvania	Active	(Note: Chapter formed from Pi Sigma Beta, established in 1990.)
**Mu Rho**	1991	Colorado State University	Fort Collins, Colorado	Active	(Note: Chapter formed from Alpha Sigma, established in 1991.)
Mu Sigma	1992–2006	Barry University	Miami Shores, Florida	Inactive	(Note: Chapter formed from Beta Upsilon, established in 1991.)
Mu Tau	1992–2021	George Mason University	Fairfax, Virginia	Inactive	(Note: Chapter formed from Gamma Mu Upsilon, established in 1991.)
Mu Upsilon	1992–2003	Baker University	Baldwin City, Kansas	Inactive	
**Mu Phi**	1992	Saginaw Valley State University	Saginaw, Michigan	Active	(Note: Chapter formed from Sigma Sigma Upsilon, established in 1987.)
**Mu Chi**	1993	University of Colorado Colorado Springs	Colorado Springs, Colorado	Active	(Note: Chapter formed from Chi Chi Chi, established in 1990.)
**Mu Psi**	1993	Iowa State University	Ames, Iowa	Active	(Note: Chapter formed from Chi Upsilon, established in 1991.)
**Mu Omega**	1993	The College of New Jersey	Ewing Township, New Jersey	Active	(Note: Chapter formed from Xi Delta Phi, established in 1992.)
**Nu Xi**	1994	University of Missouri–Kansas City	Kansas City, Missouri	Active	(Note: Chapter formed from Beta Sigma Beta, established in 1993.)
Nu Omicron	1994–2011	University of Holy Cross	New Orleans, Louisiana	Inactive	(Note: Chapter formed from the Business Leaders Association, established in 1989.)
**Nu Pi**	1994	Kennesaw State University	Kennesaw, Georgia	Active	(Note: Chapter formed from Kappa Sigma Chi, established in 1992.)
**Nu Rho**	1994	University of California, Davis	Davis, California	Active	(Note: Chapter formed from Delta Beta Alpha, established in 1993.)
**Nu Sigma**	1995	Roger Williams University	Bristol, Rhode Island	Active	(Note: Chapter formed from Rho Iota Rho, established in 1992.)
**Nu Tau**	1995	University of St. Thomas	Saint Paul, Minnesota	Active	(Note: Chapter formed from Sigma Delta, established in 1994.)
**Nu Upsilon**	1995	West Virginia University	Morgantown, West Virginia	Active	(Note: Chapter formed from Delta Theta Sigma, established in 1993.)
**Nu Phi**	1996	University of Northern Colorado	Greeley, Colorado	Active	(Note: Chapter formed from Alpha Psi Theta, established in 1994.)
**Nu Chi**	1996	University of Lynchburg	Lynchburg, Virginia	Active	(Note: Chapter formed from Delta Beta Mu, established in 1995.)
Nu Psi	1998–2001	Trinity Washington University	Washington, D.C.	Inactive	(Note: Chapter formed from Tau Beta Sigma, established in 1997.)
**Nu Omega**	1999	Rockhurst University	Kansas City, Missouri	Active	(Note: Chapter formed from Sigma Omicron Beta, established in 1998.)
**Xi Omicron**	1999	University of California, Los Angeles	Los Angeles, California	Active	(Note: Chapter formed from Lambda Alpha Epsilon, established in 1998.)
**Xi Pi**	1999	University of Redlands	Redlands, California	Active	(Note: Chapter formed from Alpha Omicron Delta, established in 1997.)
**Xi Rho**	2000	George Washington University	Washington, D.C.	Active	(Note: Chapter formed from Gamma Beta Psi, established in 1997.)
Xi Sigma	2001–2020	Wingate University	Wingate, North Carolina	Inactive	(Note: Chapter formed from Sigma Beta Epsilon, established in 1999.)
**Xi Tau**	2001	Syracuse University	Syracuse, New York	Active	(Note: Chapter formed from Sigma Beta Phi, established in 2000.)
**Xi Upsilon**	2002	Marshall University	Huntington, West Virginia	Active	(Note: Chapter formed from Mu Chi Beta, established in 2000.)
**Xi Phi**	2003	University of Massachusetts Boston	Boston, Massachusetts	Active	(Note: Chapter formed from Beta Delta Sigma, established in 2000.)
**Xi Chi**	2003	University of Wisconsin–Milwaukee	Milwaukee, Wisconsin	Active	(Note: Chapter formed from Nu Beta Phi, established in 2000.)
**Xi Psi**	2003	Bryant University	Smithfield, Rhode Island	Active	(Note: Chapter formed from Beta Alpha Omega, established in 2001.)
Xi Omega	2004–20xx ?	Florida International University	Miami, Florida	Inactive	(Note: Chapter formed from Kappa Sigma Gamma, established in 2003.)
**Omicron Pi**	2004	Radford University	Radford, Virginia	Active	(Note: Chapter formed from Chi Beta Epsilon, established in 2002.)
**Omicron Rho**	2004	Cornell University	Ithaca, New York	Active	(Note: Chapter formed from Omicron Phi, established in 2003.)
**Omicron Sigma**	2004	University of California, San Diego	La Jolla, California	Active	
Omicron Tau	2006–2016	Ohio Dominican University	Columbus, Ohio	Inactive	(Note: Chapter formed from Omicron Delta Upsilon, established in 2002.)
Omicron Upsilon	2006–2014	Francis Marion University	Florence, South Carolina	Inactive	(Note: Chapter formed from Sigma Beta Pi, established in 2004.)
**Omicron Phi**	2006	University of Texas at San Antonio	San Antonio, Texas	Active	(Note: Chapter formed from Alpha Theta Chi, established in 2004.)
**Omicron Chi**	2007	Frostburg State University	Frostburg, Maryland	Active	(Note: Chapter formed from Phi Sigma Upsilon, established in 2005.)
**Omicron Psi**	2007	Washington State University	Pullman, Washington	Active	(Note: Chapter formed from Mu Beta Alpha, established in 2005.)
**Omicron Omega**	2007	University of Delaware	Newark, Delaware	Active	
**Pi Rho**	2008	University of Massachusetts Amherst	Amherst, Massachusetts	Active	(Note: Chapter formed from Upsilon Mu Alpha, established in 2004.)
**Pi Sigma**	2008	University of California, Irvine	Irvine, California	Active	(Note: Chapter formed from Sigma Beta Iota, established in 2007.)
**Pi Tau**	2008	Albion College	Albion, Michigan	Active	(Note: Chapter formed from Alpha Beta Upsilon, established in 2007.)
Pi Upsilon	2009–2012	Florida Polytechnic University	Lakeland, Florida	Inactive	
**Pi Phi**	2010	Pace University, Westchester Campus	Pleasantville, New York	Active	
**Pi Chi**	2010	University of California, Santa Cruz	Santa Cruz, California	Active	(Note: Chapter formed from Alpha Lambda Phi, established in 2009.)
**Pi Psi**	2010	Baruch College	New York City, New York	Active	(Note: Chapter formed from Lambda Kappa Lambda, established in 2006.)
**Pi Omega**	2010	Trinity University	San Antonio, Texas	Active	(Note: Chapter formed from Omega Nu Epsilon, established in 2009.)
**Rho Sigma**	2010	University of California, Santa Barbara	Santa Barbara, California	Active	(Note: Chapter formed from Sigma Beta Epsilon, established in 2009.)
**Rho Tau**	2011	Rutgers University–New Brunswick	New Brunswick, New Jersey	Active	(Note: Chapter formed from Psi Xi Omega, established in 2010.)
**Rho Upsilon**	2011	Pepperdine University	Malibu, California	Active	(Note: Chapter formed from Pi Sigma Beta, established in 2010.)
**Rho Phi**	2012	Concordia University Irvine	Irvine, California	Active	(Note: Chapter formed from Alpha Gamma Omega, established in 2011.)
**Rho Chi**	2012	University of Hawaii at Manoa	Honolulu, Hawaii	Active	(Note: Chapter formed from Upsilon Eta Mu, established in 2010.)
**Rho Psi**	2012	University of South Florida St. Petersburg	St. Petersburg, Florida	Active	(Note: Chapter formed from Sigma Beta Pi, established in 2011.)
**Rho Omega**	2013	University of Richmond	Richmond, Virginia	Active	(Note: Chapter formed from Upsilon Omicron Rho, established in 2011.)
**Sigma Tau**	2013	Duke University	Durham, North Carolina	Active	(Note: Chapter formed from Alpha Omega Phi, established in 2012.)
**Sigma Upsilon**	2013	University of Washington	Seattle, Washington	Active	(Note: Chapter formed from Delta Gamma Omicron, established in 2012.)
**Sigma Phi**	2013	Chapman University	Orange, California	Active	(Note: Chapter formed from Epsilon Kappa Omicron, established in 2011.)
Sigma Chi	2014–20xx ?	Cameron University	Lawton, Oklahoma	Inactive	(Note: Chapter formed from Alpha Eta Omega, established in 2012.)
**Sigma Psi**	2014	Lindenwood University	St. Charles, Missouri	Active	(Note: Chapter formed from Kappa Delta Tau, established in 2011.)
**Sigma Omega**	2014	Northeastern University	Boston, Massachusetts	Active	(Note: Chapter formed from Nu Sigma Psi, established in 2013.)
Tau Upsilon	2015–20xx ?	University of Louisville	Louisville, Kentucky	Inactive	
**Tau Phi**	2015	Jacksonville State University	Jacksonville, Alabama	Active	(Note: Chapter formed from Theta Omega Sigma, established in 2013.)
**Tau Chi**	2016	University of California, Merced	Merced, California	Active	
**Tau Psi**	2016	Coastal Carolina University	Conway, South Carolina	Active	
**Tau Omega**	2016	University of La Verne	La Verne, California	Active	(Note: Chapter formed from Lambda Beta Phi, established in 2013.)
**Upsilon Phi**	2016	Eckerd College	St. Petersburg, Florida	Active	
**Upsilon Chi**	2016	California Lutheran University	Thousand Oaks, California	Active	
**Upsilon Psi**	2016	University of Washington Bothell	Bothell, Washington	Active	
**Upsilon Omega**	2016	Stony Brook University	Stony Brook, New York	Active	
**Phi Chi**	2017	University of Rhode Island	Kingston, Rhode Island	Active	
Phi Psi	2017–2022	Elon University	Elon, North Carolina	Inactive	
**Phi Omega**	2018	Cleary University	Howell, Michigan	Active	
**Chi Psi**	2018	University of Texas at Dallas	Richardson, Texas	Active	
**Chi Omega**	2018	Old Dominion University	Norfolk, Virginia	Active	
**Psi Omega**	2019	Capital University	Columbus, Ohio	Active	
**Omega Psi**	2019	St. John Fisher University	Rochester, New York	Active	
**Omega Chi**	2019	Drexel University	Philadelphia, Pennsylvania	Active	
Omega Phi	2020–2026	College of Saint Benedict and Saint John's University	Collegeville, Minnesota	Inactive	
**Omega Upsilon**	2020	Providence College	Providence, Rhode Island	Active	
Omega Tau	2021	Northwood University	Midland, Michigan	Inactive	
Omega Sigma	December 4, 2021 – 2024	University of Minnesota Duluth	Duluth, Minnesota	Inactive	
**Omega Rho**	April 20, 2024	Stevens Institute of Technology	Hoboken, New Jersey	Active	
**Omega Pi**	April 27, 2024	Clark Atlanta University	Atlanta, Georgia	Active	
**Omega Omicron**	February 25, 2025	University of Illinois Chicago	Chicago, Illinois	Active	

== See also ==
- Professional fraternities and sororities
