= UHV =

UHV may refer to:

- Ultra-high vacuum, the vacuum regime characterised by pressures lower than about 10^{−7} pascal
- Ultra-high voltage, a classification of overhead power line with an operating voltage of higher than 800 kV
- University of Houston–Victoria, former name of the U.S. institution now known as Texas A&M University–Victoria
