= List of Kappa Tau Alpha chapters =

Kappa Tau Alpha is an American college honor society for journalism and mass communication. In the following list of its chapters, active chapters are indicated in bold and inactive chapters are in italics.

Chapter	Charter date and order	Institution	Location	Status	Ref.
	1910	University of Missouri	Columbia, Missouri	Active	
	1925	University of Illinois Urbana-Champaign	Urbana, Illinois	Active	
	1930	Ohio University	Athens, Ohio	Active	
	1930	West Virginia University	Morgantown, West Virginia	Active	
	1931	Marquette University	Milwaukee, Wisconsin	Active	
	1931	Southern Methodist University	Dallas, Texas	Active	
	1933	University of Colorado Boulder	Boulder, Colorado	Active	
	1936	Ohio State University	Columbus, Ohio	Active	
	1936	University of Iowa	Iowa City, Iowa	Active	
	1947	University of Nebraska–Lincoln	Lincoln, Nebraska	Active	
	1948	University of Minnesota	Saint Paul, Minnesota	Active	
	1949	Northwestern University	Evanston, Illinois	Active	
	1949	University of Georgia	Athens, Georgia	Active	
	1951	University of Florida	Gainesville, Florida	Active	
	1951	University of Oklahoma	Norman, Oklahoma	Active	
	1951	University of Utah	Salt Lake City, Utah	Active	
	1952	Brigham Young University	Provo, Utah	Active	
	1952	University of Tennessee	Knoxville, Tennessee	Active	
Douglas A. Anderson	1955	Pennsylvania State University	University Park, Pennsylvania	Active	
	1955–202x ?	San Jose State University	San Jose, California	Inactive	
	1955	University of North Carolina at Chapel Hill	Chapel Hill, North Carolina	Active	
	1956	Michigan State University	East Lansing, Michigan	Active	
	1956	University of Nevada, Reno	Reno, Nevada	Active	
	1959	Oklahoma State University–Stillwater	Stillwater, Oklahoma	Active	
	1960	University of Oregon	Eugene, Oregon	Active	
	1961	University of Maryland, College Park	College Park, Maryland	Active	
Olin Hinkle	1961	University of Texas at Austin	Austin, Texas	Active	
	1962	Duquesne University	Pittsburgh, Pennsylvania	Active	
	1962	South Dakota State University	Brookings, South Dakota	Active	
	1966	American University	Washington, D.C.	Active	
	1967	LIU Brooklyn	Brooklyn, New York City, New York	Active	
	1967	Texas Tech University	Lubbock, Texas	Active	
Elmer Beth	1967	University of Kansas	Lawrence, Kansas	Active	
	1968	Ball State University	Muncie, Indiana	Active	
	1968	University of South Carolina	Columbia, South Carolina	Active	
	1970	California State University, Northridge	Northridge, Los Angeles, California	Active	
	1970	University of Arizona	Tucson, Arizona	Active	
	1971	Bowling Green State University	Bowling Green, Ohio	Active	
	1971	Drake University	Des Moines, Iowa	Active	
	1972	San Diego State University	San Diego, California	Active	
	1972	University of North Texas	Denton, Texas	Active	
	1973	University of Memphis	Memphis, Tennessee	Active	
	1974	St. Bonaventure University	St. Bonaventure, New York	Active	
	1974	Temple University	Philadelphia, Pennsylvania	Active	
	1974	University of Alabama	Tuscaloosa, Alabama	Active	
	1975	California State University, Long Beach	Long Beach, California	Active	
	1977	Syracuse University	Syracuse, New York	Active	
	1977	University of Arkansas at Little Rock	Little Rock, Arkansas	Active	
	1977	University of South Florida	Sarasota, Florida	Active	
	1978	Louisiana State University	Baton Rouge, Louisiana	Active	
	1978	University of Hawaiʻi at Mānoa	Mānoa, Honolulu, Hawaii	Active	
	1978	University of Mississippi	University, Mississippi	Active	
	1978	Virginia Commonwealth University	Richmond, Virginia	Active	
	1979	Texas Christian University	Fort Worth, Texas	Active	
David J. Lippert	1979	University of Wisconsin–Oshkosh	Oshkosh, Wisconsin	Active	
	1981	Arkansas State University	Jonesboro, Arkansas	Active	
	1981	Hampton University	Hampton, Virginia	Active	
	1981	University of Central Oklahoma	Edmond, Oklahoma	Active	
	1981	Western Kentucky University	Bowling Green, Kentucky	Active	
	1983	Eastern Illinois University	Charleston, Illinois	Active	
	1983	Eastern Kentucky University	Richmond, Kentucky	Active	
	1983	Northern Illinois University	DeKalb, Illinois	Active	
Charles Arrendell	1984	University of Texas at Arlington	Arlington, Texas	Active	
	1985	California State University, Fullerton	Fullerton, California	Active	
	1986	Abilene Christian University	Abilene, Texas	Active	
Michael Bugeja	1986	Iowa State University	Ames, Iowa	Active	
	1986	Northeastern University	Boston, Massachusetts	Active	
	1986	Virginia Tech	Blacksburg, Virginia	Active	
	1987	California State University, Fresno	Fresno, California	Active	
	1990	Kent State University	Kent, Ohio	Active	
	1990	Loyola University New Orleans	New Orleans, Louisiana	Active	
	1990	University of Massachusetts Amherst	Amherst, Massachusetts	Active	
	1990	University of Southern Mississippi	Hattiesburg, Mississippi	Active	
	1990	Winthrop University	Rock Hill, South Carolina	Active	
	1991	Murray State University	Murray, Kentucky	Active	
	1993	Florida International University	Miami, Florida	Active	
	1996	Baylor University	Waco, Texas	Active	
	1996	Florida A&M University	Tallahassee, Florida	Active	
	1997	Colorado State University	Fort Collins, Colorado	Active	
	1997	Texas State University	San Marcos, Texas	Active	
	1999	Samford University	Homewood, Alabama	Active	
	1998	Nicholls State University	Thibodaux, Louisiana	Active	
	1999	University of Tennessee at Chattanooga	Chattanooga, Tennessee	Active	
	19xx ?–xxxx ?	Texas A&M University	College Station, Texas	Inactive	
	19xx ?–20xx ?	University of Wisconsin–Eau Claire	Eau Claire, Wisconsin	Active	
	2001	University of Central Florida	Orlando, Florida	Inactive	
	2003	Rutgers University–New Brunswick	New Brunswick and Piscataway, New Jersey	Active	
	2003	Saint Michael's College	Colchester, Vermont	Active	
	2006	Arizona State University	Tempe, Arizona	Active	
	2006	University of Nebraska Omaha	Omaha, Nebraska	Active	
	2007	North Carolina A&T State University	Greensboro, North Carolina	Active	
	2007	University of Nevada, Las Vegas	Las Vegas, Nevada	Active	
	2010	Middle Tennessee State University	Murfreesboro, Tennessee	Active	
	2010	University of Miami	Coral Gables, Florida	Active	
	2011	Indiana University Bloomington	Bloomington, Indiana	Active	
Robert W. Dardenne	2012	University of South Florida St. Petersburg	St. Petersburg, Florida	Active	
	2015	Iona University	New Rochelle, New York	Active	
	2017	Linfield University	McMinnville, Oregon	Active	
	2019	Southern Illinois University Carbondale	Carbondale, Illinois	Active	
Louise Benjamin	2021	Kansas State University	Manhattan, Kansas	Active	
	2022	Elon University	Elon, North Carolina	Active	
	2024	Western Washington University	Bellingham, Washington	Active	
