= University of South Florida St. Petersburg Baseball Club =

University of South Florida St. Petersburg
- Motto: "Truth and Wisdom"
- Established: 1965
- Chancellor: Sophia Wisniewska
- President: Dr. Judy Genshaft
- Undergraduates: 3,422
- Postgraduates: Approximately 500
- Location: St. Petersburg, Florida, USA
- Campus: 46 acres (0.19 km^{2})
- Colors: Green and Gold
- Nickname: Bulls
- Mascot: Rocky the Bull
- Website: http://www.usfsp.edu/

The University of South Florida St. Petersburg Baseball Club was founded during the 2013 Fall semester. The club's president, founder, and head coach, Jeremy Berger, wanted to offer USFSP students the opportunity to play college baseball competitively. Even though the team is treated as a fraternity, both male and female students are welcomed to join the team.

The team's opening game was against the University of South Florida Tampa Campus' team. The USFSP baseball team won and earned well deserved bragging rights and huge momentum the team carried throughout the rest of the season. The team finished its inaugural opening season with an 18–5 season and played against larger, well established teams like the University of Florida and Florida State University. The team also traveled to Miami to play the University of Miami. However, because the team is considered only a club and is not a registered, official team, the USFSP Baseball Club was ineligible to play or qualify for any championships or playoffs.

However, the team does have long-term plans of becoming an NCAA team. In the meantime, the officers and players are focusing on recruiting more talented players. This way, the team can gain more acknowledgment and support from faculty and students. They also want to establish a name for themselves amongst other colleges. The team also hopes that more fans will come out to support the baseball team during their games next season, even if they do not like baseball. Players have said that simply coming to the game to support student athletes, friends, and classmates is encouraging.

Despite being barred from championships at the present time, the team did have some special acknowledgments and awards to accompany its amazing first season including an acknowledgment from USF President Dr. Judy Genshaft and was the 2013-14 New Organization of the Year. Berger was also nominated for student leader of the year.

The season began on February 15, 2014, with USF St. Petersburg playing against USF Tampa. The competition was dubbed “The Battle of the Bay” and was inspired by the already existent inter-campus rivalries. Dozens of students from both campuses arrived to cheer on their teams. Although the Tampa team, which was also playing its inaugural game, lost the 9-inning contest, both teams hope to make the inter-campus games an annual tradition.

For its first season, the team made Al Lang Stadium and Walter Fuller Baseball Stadium its home stadiums. The Al Lang Stadium, a couple blocks away from the school campus and in the heart of downtown St. Petersburg, Florida, hosts dozens of sporting events for several different teams and sports. During soccer season, the stadium is transformed into a soccer field and hosts The Rowdies, the St. Petersburg professional soccer team. When the season is over, however, the field is transformed into a baseball field and allows for amateur baseball teams to play. The Walter Fuller Baseball Stadium was the former spring training field for the Tampa Bay Rays. However, when the Rays moved spring training to the Charlotte Sports Park, the Walter Fuller Baseball Stadium started hosting high school baseball teams and baseball tournaments.

On June 5, 2014, the St. Petersburg City Council held a meeting to determine if future contracts with the USFSP team will be made. The council decided in favor for these future contracts to be written. Now, the team has a place to play for at least one more season.

USF St. Petersburg has yet to build a stadium for any of the school's organized sports to be played on teams. The small campus does have a gym with dozens of work out machines, a pool, a couple basketball courts, and a waterfront program that gives sailing, scuba diving, and paddle boarding lessons just to name a few of its services.

The only team that the USFSP campus houses is the sailing team. This team keeps all of its equipment in the school's harbor and waterfront storage house. Because the school borders against the water, the sailing team practices and races in the ocean behind the campus. Also, because of the nature of this water sport, no benches or bleachers have been made to observe the races from land.

All the other USF teams are based out of the USF Tampa campus. However, even in Tampa, the teams often have to go to a different, already established stadium for professional teams in order to play. Even the USF football team has to travel to Raymond James Stadium (the home of the Tampa Bay Buccaneers) to play opponents in games.

Despite the USFSP baseball team having an impressive first season and bring more sports to the St. Petersburg campus, it is not the first time a baseball team has represented the small, coastal campus. For several years during the 1970s, not a full decade after the campus was founded, students had built a team as well. Like today, the team was categorized as a club rather than an actual, registered team - likely due to the fact that it is a club, not a registered team. Players brought their own gloves, bats, and other equipment in order to play since the school did not provide any. Despite this, the team still played larger universities and had impressive season records, much like today's team. Because the USFSP would rarely win against these other registered teams, it often confused the other team about what to do with their records. Other universities did not know if these games should count as wins since the USFSP team was not registered. It was common for these teams to decide not to include the USFSP games in their records. They simply considered the games to be practice or warm ups for the rest of the season.
