= Christian Hardigree =

American academic administrator and lawyer

President of Texas A&M University–Victoria
- Incumbent
- Assumed office November 2025

Personal details
- Children: 3
- Education: University of Nevada, Las Vegas; Mercer University

Christian E. Hardigree is an American academic administrator and lawyer who is the president of Texas A&M University–Victoria. She previously served as the regional chancellor for the University of South Florida St. Petersburg campus from July 2022 to November 2025. An attorney by training with a background in hospitality, Hardigree has held leadership positions at Metropolitan State University of Denver, Kennesaw State University, and the University of Nevada, Las Vegas.

== Early life and education ==
Hardigree lived in Denton and Lake Dallas, Texas, during her childhood. Her father and both of her grandfathers served in the U.S. military, and she is a member of the Daughters of the American Revolution. She earned a B.S. in hotel administration, cum laude, from the University of Nevada, Las Vegas in 1993. In 1996, she received a J.D. from the Mercer University School of Law, where she specialized in employment law and labor management relations.

== Career ==
=== Legal career ===
Hardigree worked as a law clerk for the gaming control division of the Nevada Attorney General's office in 1995 and as an attorney at the firm Faux & Associates from 1996 to 1997. In 1997, she was selected to be a special agent for the Federal Bureau of Investigation (FBI) but withdrew from the role at her mother's request following the sudden death of her father.

Hardigree has been licensed to practice law in Georgia since 1996 and in Nevada since 1998. From 1997 to 2020, she was a senior litigation attorney and partner at Parnell & Associates. As a trial attorney in Las Vegas, Hardigree defended clients in lawsuits with potential exposures totaling over $100 million and represented major hospitality clients, including nightclubs, restaurants, and casinos such as The Venetian Las Vegas and Bellagio. During this period, she became a presenter on legal topics related to the hospitality industry, particularly on liability issues concerning bed bugs.

=== Academia ===
Hardigree began her career in academia in January 1997 as a part-time instructor at the University of Nevada, Las Vegas (UNLV), her alma mater. She became an assistant professor in 2001 and was granted tenure as an associate professor in 2006, teaching courses in hospitality and employment law. During her tenure at UNLV, which concluded in June 2012, she held several administrative roles. She was the Associate Dean for Strategic Initiatives from 2007 to 2008 and served two separate terms as Department Chair of Hotel Management. She also worked in the university's central administration as Assistant President and Chief of Staff from 2008 to 2009 and as Associate Athletic Director for Community Development & Special Projects from 2009 to 2010.

In June 2012, Hardigree left UNLV to become the founding director of the Institute for Culinary Sustainability and Hospitality at Kennesaw State University. In 2015, she secured a $5 million donation that resulted in the naming of the Michael A. Leven School of Culinary Sustainability and Hospitality. At the time, this was the largest private gift in the university's history. She remained at Kennesaw State until December 2018.

In January 2019, Hardigree was appointed founding dean of the School of Hospitality at Metropolitan State University of Denver. During her leadership, she secured a $1.54 million gift to create the Gina & Frank Day Leadership Academy, which was then the largest private gift in the university's history.

Hardigree was named regional chancellor of the University of South Florida St. Petersburg campus, with her term beginning on July 1, 2022. Her appointment followed the 2020 consolidation of USF's three campuses, an effort she described as her "norm" to "take it to the next level". Under her leadership, the campus secured over $40 million for an environmental and oceanographic sciences facility and an office for veteran services. She oversaw the creation of a research lab studying human trafficking and a program to provide higher education experiences for young adults with intellectual disabilities. To foster faculty relationships, she created a "supper club" for professors going through the tenure process to build camaraderie and encourage interdisciplinary research. Hardigree guided the campus community through six hurricanes. Her final day at USF is November 3, 2025.

On September 24, 2025, Hardigree was named the sole finalist to become the next president of Texas A&M University–Victoria. The university, formerly the University of Houston–Victoria, had been acquired by the Texas A&M University System in June 2025. Her selection drew some criticism, prompting Texas A&M System Chancellor Glenn Hegar to publish an opinion piece defending her as a "lifelong conservative" and a "patriot," disputing labels of her being a "'woke' activist".

== Personal life ==
As of 2021, Hardigree and her husband, Chris, had been married for 16 years. They have two sons and a daughter. She is a registered Republican.
