= Deni Elliott =

American philosopher

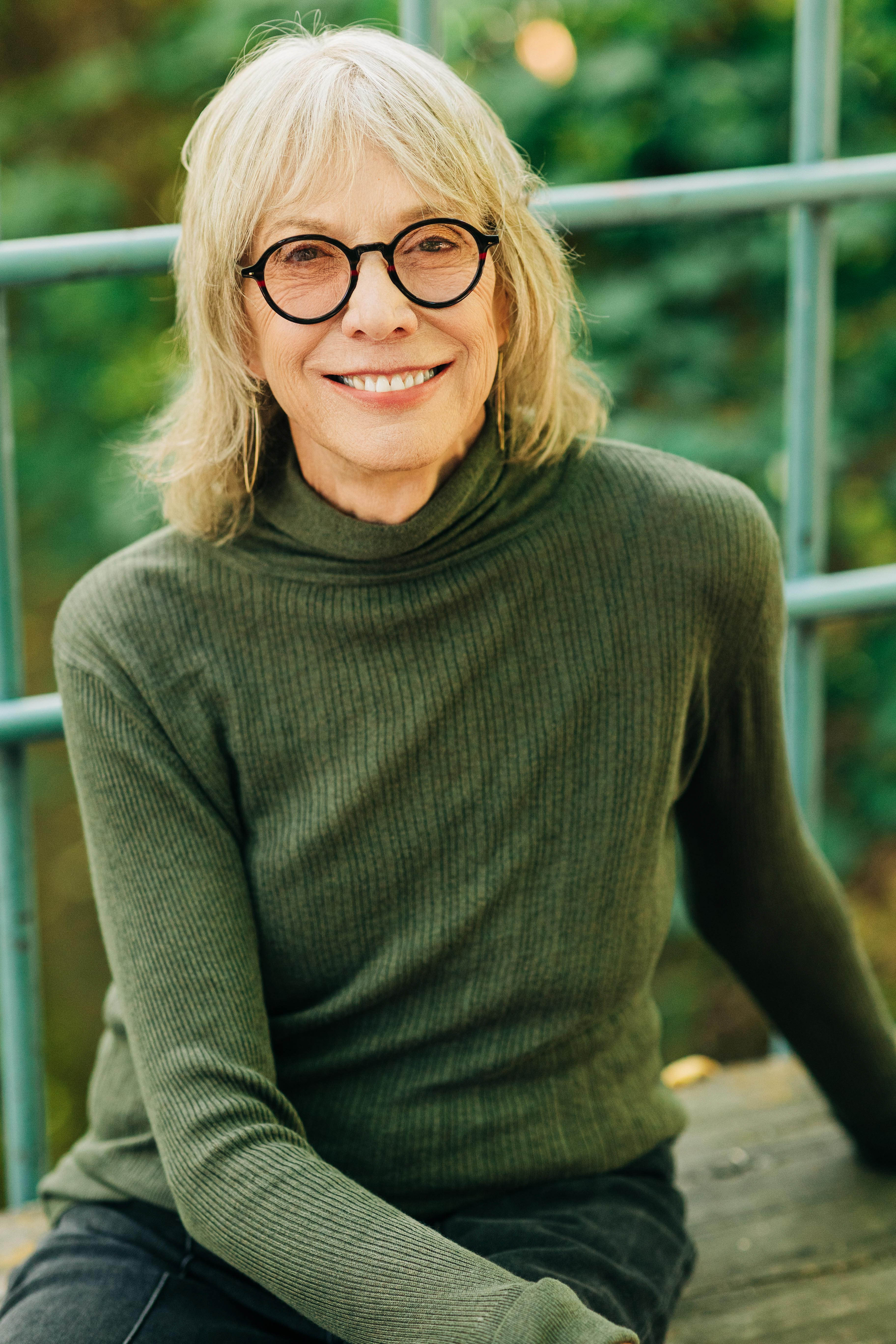
- Photo by Kristine Paulsen
- Occupations: Professor Emeritus, University of South Florida and Project Co-Director, National Ethics Project University of South Florida St. Petersburg.

Deni Elliott, D.Ed. (born 1953) is an American ethicist and ethics scholar, active in ethics scholarship and application since the 1980s. She is professor emeritus at University of South Florida. She held the Eleanor Poynter Jamison Chair in Media Ethics and Press Policy, professor in the Department of Journalism and Digital Communication (2003-2023), served as Interim Regional Vice Chancellor for Academic Affairs (2021-2022) and was Department Chair (2012-2018) on the University of South Florida, St. Petersburg campus. Elliott is Project Co-Director for the National Ethics Project. She served as the public member on the American Psychological Association Ethics Committee from 2020-2023. Elliott’s latest book, Catching Sight: how a guide dog helped me see myself, will be released June 16, 2026 from Beacon Press. According to a pre-publication review, “Catching Sight will reward the curious reader with fascinating accounts of dog training and the adaptations involved in coping with disability. But best of all, it's a heartwarming story of human-animal connection and resilience.”

== Early life and education ==
Deni Elliott completed her B.A. in Mass Communication and Journalism at the University of Maryland, finished the M.A. in Philosophy at Wayne State University and her D.Ed. in philosophy of education at Harvard University. Her doctoral examination committee members included Israel Scheffler, Sissela Bok, Lawrence Kohlberg, and Martin Linsky.

== Career ==
While in graduate school, Elliott was appointed to the Harvard Educational Review from 1982-1983. Elliott was named one of the first two Rockefeller Fellows in Professional Ethics at Dartmouth College in 1987 and served as the first full-time director of Dartmouth's Institute for the Study of Applied and Professional Ethics (1988–1993). She is a founding member of the Association for Practical and Professional Ethics (APPE) and served on the Executive Board, successively re-elected from 1991 through 2017. She was elected Chair of the Board of Directors for APPE in March, 2013. Elliott served as Mansfield Professor of Ethics and Public Affairs at the University of Montana (1992–96) and founding director of UM's Practical Ethics Center (1996–2003). She was awarded the Poynter Jamison Chair in Media Ethics and Press Policy at the University of South Florida, St. Petersburg in 2003. Elliott served as the campus Ombuds for USF, St. Petersburg campus through 2017 and was the Interim Regional Vice Chancellor of Academic Affairs and Vice-Provost (RVCAA-VP) for the campus 2021-2022.

Elliott served as the book review editor for the Journal of Mass Media Ethics (1986–2006) and directed the first U.S. graduate degree program in teaching ethics at the University of Montana (1996–2003). In addition, Elliott served as the Ethics Officer for the Metropolitan Water District of Southern California from 2004-2012.

Elliott has published widely in practical ethics for the scholarly, trade and lay press. She also co-hosted a two-minute weekly radio show, Ethically Speaking, produced through KUFM radio, with some episodes syndicated through PRX.

Elliott was appointed to the Graduate Council for Guiding Eyes for the Blind from 2013-2017 and chaired the nation's first Continuing Education Seminar for guide dog users in April 2017.

== Books and documentary films ==
1. Responsible Journalism, Sage, 1986
2. and Bill Fisk (Co-producers), A Case of Need: Media Coverage and Organ Transplants, Fanlight Productions, 1990
3. Wendy Conquest, Bob Drake and Deni Elliott (co-producers) Buying Time: The Media Role in Health Care, Fanlight Productions, 1991
4. Wendy Conquest, Bob Drake and Deni Elliott (co-producers) The Burden of Knowledge: Moral Dilemmas in Prenatal Testing, Fanlight Productions, 1991
5. The Ethics of Asking: Dilemmas in Higher Education Fund Raising, Johns Hopkins University Press, 1995
6. and Judy Stern, Research Ethics: A Reader, University Press of New England, 1997
7. Judy Stern and Deni Elliott, The Ethics of Scientific Research: A Guidebook for Course Development, University Press of New England, 1997
8. Elliot D. Cohen and Deni Elliott, Contemporary Ethical Issues: Journalism, ABC-CLIO, 1998
9. The Kindness of Strangers: Philanthropy and Higher Education, Rowman & Littlefield, 2006
10. Ethics in the First Person: A Guide to Teaching and Learning Practical Ethics, Rowman & Littlefield, 2007
11. Ethical Challenges: Building an Ethics Toolkit, Authorhouse, 2009
12. Deni Elliott and Edward H. Spence. Ethics for a Digital Era, Wiley-Blackwell, 2017
13. with Graham Buck. Catching Sight: How a Guide Dog Helped Me See Myself, Beacon Press, 2026 (forthcoming)
