= Texas A&M University–Victoria =

Public university in Victoria, Texas, U.S.

- Former names: University of Houston Victoria Center (1973–1983); University of Houston–Victoria (1983–2025)
- Type: Public university
- Established: 1973
- Parent institution: Texas A&M University System
- Endowment: $16.33 million (FY2024) $1.11 billion (FY2024) (system-wide)
- Budget: $69.5 million (FY2025)
- President: Christian Hardigree
- Provost: Alyssa Kiesow
- Faculty: 213
- Administrative staff: 299
- Students: 3,784 (fall 2023)
- Location: Victoria, Texas, U.S. 28.8164°N 96.9764°W
- Campus: Suburban, 20 acres (8.1 ha)
- Colors: Red, Black & Gold
- Nickname: Jaguars
- Sporting affiliations: NAIA – RRAC
- Website: www.tamuv.edu

Texas A&M University–Victoria is a public university in Victoria, Texas, United States. It is part of the Texas A&M University System. Its campus spans 20 acres (8.1 ha) in Victoria and was established in 1973.

== History ==
=== University of Houston System (1973–2025) ===
The University of Houston–Victoria began as an effort in the late 1960s by the local community to bring a higher learning institution to Victoria. In 1971, the Coordinating Board of Texas College and University System created an off-campus center of the University of Houston known as the University of Houston Victoria Center. One hundred students enrolled at the center in its inaugural semester of spring 1973.

In April 1983, the Texas legislature passed Senate Bill 235, which granted the institution permanent degree-granting status in the state of Texas. The University of Houston Victoria Center was renamed the University of Houston-Victoria, and became the University of Houston System's fourth university.

UHV started its athletics program during the 2007–2008 school year with the Jaguars baseball and softball teams. Since then, the teams have competed in the National Association of Intercollegiate Athletics. Soccer and golf programs for both men and women began in fall 2010.

In October 2008, the UH System Board of Regents adopted a resolution authorizing UHV to seek enabling state legislation to add freshmen and sophomores. In the 81st Texas legislative session, Texas State Representative Geanie Morrison of Victoria introduced House Bill 1056, which would allow UHV to expand, and Texas State Senator Glenn Hegar introduced an identical bill, Senate Bill 567. Texas Governor Rick Perry signed HB 1056 into law on June 19, 2009. The Southern Association of Colleges and Schools approved UHV to admit underclassmen and offer lower-division courses on November 17, 2009, and UHV also received its first freshman application the same day. UHV's first freshmen and sophomores started taking classes in fall 2010, and the university's first residence hall, Jaguar Hall, opened on the Victoria campus.

=== Transfer to Texas A&M University System ===
On May 27, 2025, Governor Greg Abbott signed legislation which started the transfer of UH–Victoria to the Texas A&M University System effective September 1, 2025.

On July 17, 2025, a ceremony was held to unveil new logos under the new name, retaining the same colors under the UHV title, and keeping everything else largely unchanged, other than a refreshed logo and mascot for the Jaguars.

On September 1, 2025, Texas A&M University–Victoria became the twelfth university to join the Texas A&M University System.

Additionally, as part of the transfer, Texas A&M University System Associate Vice Chancellor Dr. Jim Nelson announced that the university will offer new engineering programs and an aviation program, expected to be finalized in Fall 2027.

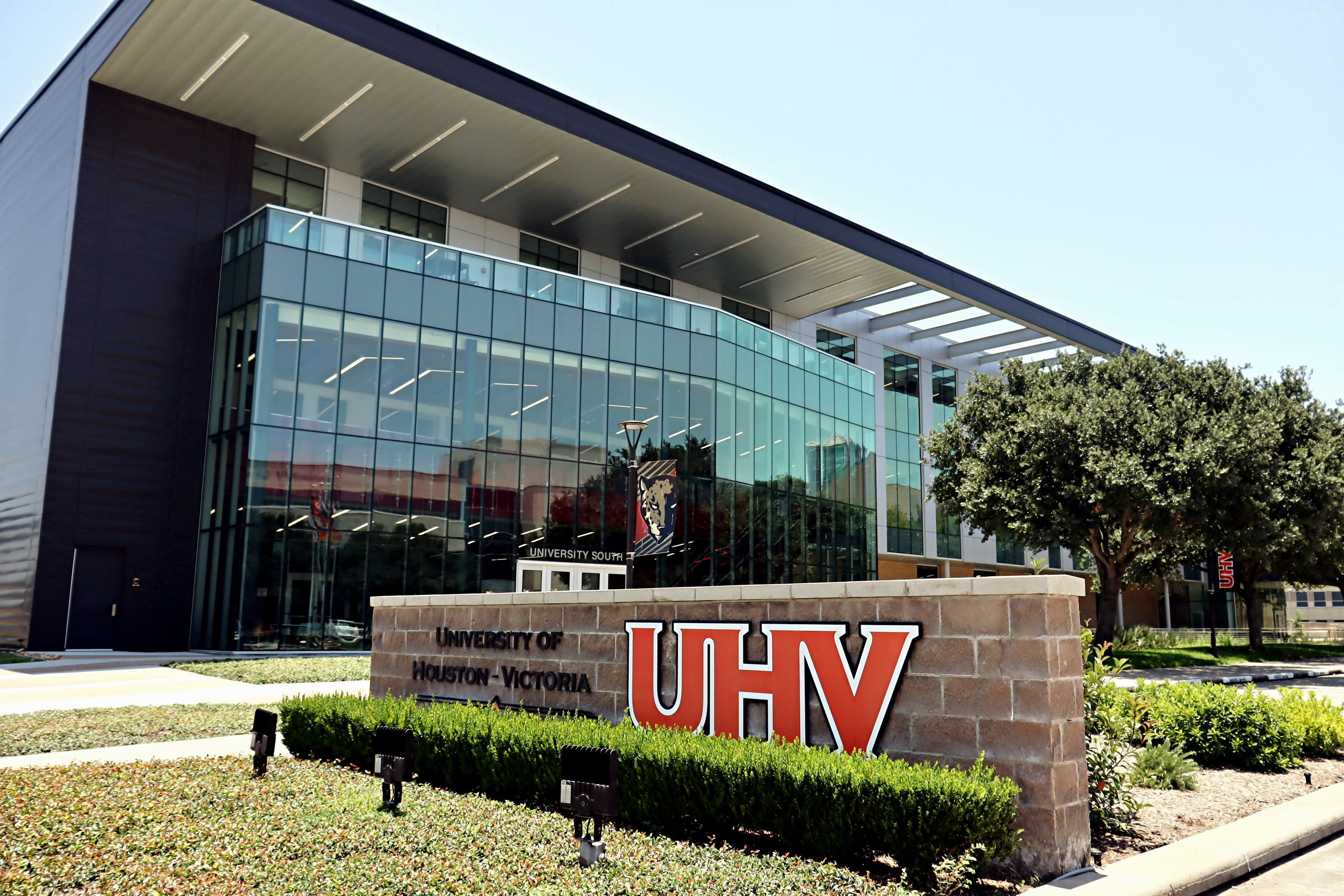
University South

== Institutional structure ==
Texas A&M University–Victoria is one of twelve universities making up the Texas A&M University System. The institution is separately accredited, offers its own academic programs and confers its own degrees, and has its own administration. A&M–Victoria is a stand-alone university; it is not a branch campus of Texas A&M University. Although TAMU and A&M–Victoria are both component institutions of the Texas A&M University System, they are separate degree-granting universities.

The organization and control of the Texas A&M University–Victoria is vested in the Board of Regents of the Texas A&M University System. The board has all the rights, powers, and duties that it has with respect to the organization and control of other institutions in the System; however, A&M–Victoria is maintained as a separate and distinct institution.

=== Administration ===
The president is the chief executive officer of Texas A&M University–Victoria. The president is appointed by the chancellor and confirmed by the Board of Regents of the Texas A&M University System. Since November 4, 2025, Christian Hardigree has served as the president.

- Reginald Taylor, 1972–1978
- Robert C. Maxson, 1978–1982
- Martha K. Piper, 1982–1986
- Glenn A. Goerke, 1986–1991
- Don N. Smith (interim), 1991–1992
- Lesta Van Der Wert Turchen, 1992–1995
- Karen S. Haynes, 1995–2004
- Don N. Smith (interim), 2004
- Tim Hudson, 2004–2010
- Don N. Smith (interim), 2010–2011
- Philip D. Castille, 2011–2014
- Raymond V. Morgan, Jr., 2014–2018
- Robert (Bob) K. Glenn, 2018–2025
- James Nelson (interim), 2025
- Christian Hardigree, 2025–present

== Academics ==
University West

Academic rankings

Regional
- U.S. News & World Report: Tier 2

Texas A&M University–Victoria is separately accredited, offers its own academic programs and confers its own degrees, and has its own administration. A&M–Victoria is a stand-alone university; it is not a branch campus of Texas A&M University. Although TAMU and A&M–Victoria are both component institutions of the Texas A&M University System, they are separate degree-granting universities. Students who graduated from UHV through summer 2025 will have diplomas under the name University of Houston–Victoria, with options to reprint under the name Texas A&M University–Victoria.

While previously an upper-division and graduate school only, UHV expanded in fall 2010 to admit freshmen and sophomores. A&M–Victoria consists of four academic colleges: the School of Arts & Sciences, the School of Business Administration, the School of Education & Human Development, and the School of Nursing. Each school offers both undergraduate degrees and master's degrees.

=== Colleges ===
==== College of Liberal Arts & Social Sciences ====
The College of Liberal Arts & Social Sciences offers flexible course scheduling through online classes and off-site courses, in addition to the traditional on-campus classes. The College of Liberal Arts & Social Sciences offers a range of programs in the divisions of Humanities; Social & Behavioral Sciences. The College of Liberal Arts and Social Sciences offers bachelor's and master's degrees.

==== College of Business ====
Texas A&M University–Victoria's College of Business offers face-to-face or 100% online degree programs. The College of Business offers bachelor's and master's degrees.

==== College of Education & Human Development ====
The College of Education & Human Development offers both undergraduate and graduate degrees. The undergraduate degree is for those seeking elementary, middle and secondary teaching careers or a career in health studies as a public health educator.

==== College of Natural and Applied Science ====
The College of Natural and Applied Science offers both undergraduate and graduate degrees. The undergraduate degree programs include Biology, Computer Information Systems (with concentration in cybersecurity and data science), Computer Science, Digital Gaming & Simulation, Joint Admission Medical Program, Mathematical Sciences, and Secondary Teacher Certification.

=== Faculty ===
Currently, the university has a 14-to-1 ratio and an average class size of 20 students. Instructors come from all over the world.

Honor societies with A&M–Victoria chapters include Phi Kappa Phi, Gamma Beta Phi, Chi Sigma Iota, Psi Chi and Kappa Delta Pi.

=== Degree in Three ===
A&M–Victoria was the first Texas public university to offer an accelerated program where students can earn a complete, 120-credit-hour bachelor's degree in just three years. Degree in Three, or Dn3, lets students earn a degree in communication, criminal justice, English, history or psychology.

== Campus ==
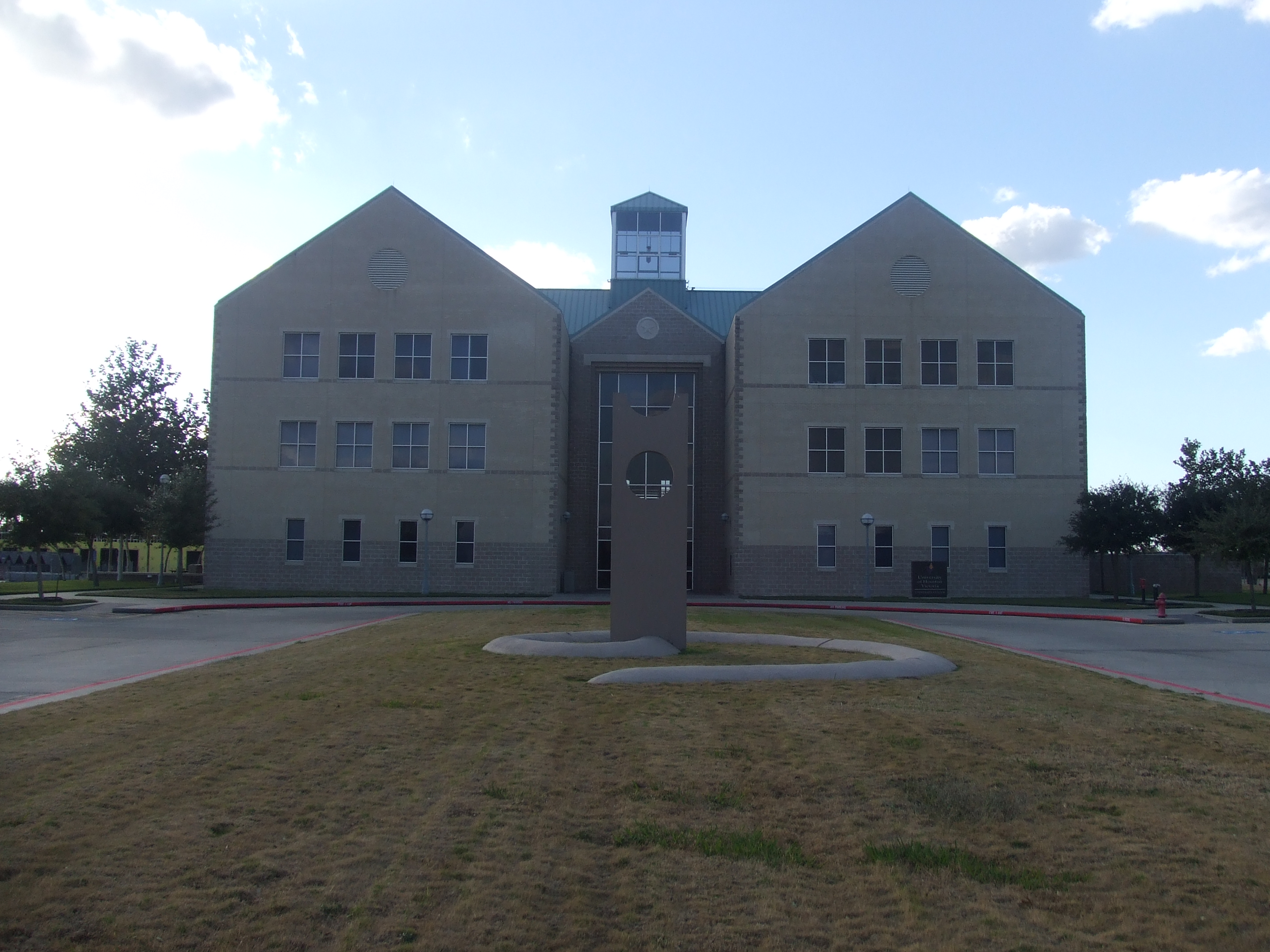
University Center

The campus of A&M–Victoria is located in Victoria, which is part of the Texas Coastal Bend region. It is approximately 30 miles (48 km) from the Gulf of Mexico. The university is nearly equidistant by about 125 miles (201 km) from the cities of Houston, San Antonio and Austin. The Victoria campus consists of about 20 acres (81,000 m2) of land.

The Victoria campus shares some of its facilities with Victoria College. This includes a bookstore/student center, a three-story library with more than 185,000 items in their collection and a fitness center that includes a gym and weight room.

=== UHV Katy ===
For years, the University of Houston–Victoria offered classes in Cinco Ranch, Sugar Land and Katy. Eventually a whole floor was used by the university in a different shared building with the University of Houston, north of I-10 and off TX-99 (Grand Parkway). The University of Houston–Victoria opened the Katy teaching center in University Park, in a new building. After the transfer to the Texas A&M University System, it was announced that UHV Katy would discontinue operations in Fall 2026, with the University of Houston System absorbing the existing facility.

== Student life ==
Undergraduate demographics as of Fall 2023
Race and ethnicity	Total
Hispanic	45%
White	27%
Black	13%
Asian	7%
International student	3%
Two or more races	3%
Unknown	1%
Economic diversity
Low-income (Note: The percentage of students who received an income-based federal Pell grant intended for low-income students.)	47%
Affluent (Note: The percentage of students who are a part of the American middle class at the bare minimum.)	53%

Jaguar Village consists of three residence halls: Jaguar Hall and Jaguar Suites.

Jaguar Hall also has an on-site dining room and is located a short 10-minute walk from the A&M–Victoria campus.

Don and Mona Smith Hall is the newest student housing project and is adjacent to the University Commons Building, which houses student commons, student involvement and the library. The $22.8 million, 81,353 square feet (7,557.9 m^{2}) building is a three-story facility that includes 280 beds for sophomores and upper-level students, a large classroom, programming space, reception area, laundry, and common kitchens on every floor.

The University Commons was a $29.5 million project located directly across from the University Center building. The Student Center area includes a bookstore, food court, lounge and game room space, staff office space, and Student Government space, and other amenities. The Learning Commons will include library services, a variety of technologies, private and group study spaces, comfortable and movable furniture, writing assistance and tutoring.

The South building is adjacent to the University Center building and directly across from the University North building. The $28 million, 56,464 square feet (5,245.7 m^{2}) building includes lab space for biology, physics, chemistry, organic chemistry, computer science, microbiology, computer engineering and mathematics; classrooms, faculty and staff offices, immersive 180 degree screen lab, seminar room, and gathering spaces. The addition of this building allows new degree offerings in educational technology, computer engineering, and an economics concentration in the BBA.

The University Northwest building consists of approximately 10 acres (4.0 ha) and 124,000 square feet (11,500 m^{2}). The site houses 50% of the library collection, A&M–Victoria athletics teams, the Small Business Development Center, and is a climate-controlled space for records retention and storage.

== Athletics ==
The A&M–Victoria athletic teams are called the Jaguars. Before the transfer to the Texas A&M University System, its athletic program was branded as UHV (for the University of Houston–Victoria) and was one of two University of Houston System member schools with a varsity athletic program. The university is a member of the National Association of Intercollegiate Athletics (NAIA), primarily competing in the Red River Athletic Conference (RRAC) since the 2015–16 academic year. The Jaguars previously competed as an NAIA Independent within the Association of Independent Institutions (AII) from the school's athletic program's inception in 2007–08 until 2014–15.

The Jaguars compete in six intercollegiate sports: Men's sports include baseball, golf and soccer; while women's sports include golf, soccer and softball. A&M–Victoria (back then as UHV) began its intercollegiate athletic program with baseball and softball in 2007–08, followed by men's & women's golf and men's & women's soccer in 2010–11.

=== Athletic director ===
Ashley Walyuchow has served as director of athletics since the program's inception in 2006.

=== Baseball ===
The Jaguars baseball team won back-to-back Association of Independent Institutions (AII) conference championships (2009 and 2010). The team plays its home games at Riverside Stadium in Victoria, Texas. Head coach Terry Puhl is a former outfielder for the Houston Astros and Kansas City Royals. Puhl is also a Canadian Baseball Hall of Fame and Texas Baseball Hall of Fame inductee, and served as head coach for the Canadian national baseball team in a win over Cuba at the Olympic qualifier in 2006 and at the 2008 Summer Olympics.

=== Softball ===
The Jaguars softball team won the first AII conference championship, finished 11th in the nation in 2009 and was ranked 21st in 2010. The Jaguar softball team won its second AII conference title in May 2013. The Jaguars moved on to the opening round of the NAIA national championship, where they were defeated by Lubbock Christian University, finishing the season ranked 18th. The team plays its home games at Victoria's Youth Sports Complex, located in Victoria, Texas. The Jaguars are coached by Lindsey Ortiz, a former player on the first Jaguars team.

=== Soccer ===
The Jaguars men's and women's teams began in fall 2010. A soccer field, dubbed "The Cage" by players, was constructed on the UHV campus, and the men's and women's teams hosted the first on-campus home games ever during their fall campaign.

The men's team and women's teams are coached by Adrian Rigby, the teams have seen steady improvement since day one. The men's team won both 2017 RRAC regular season and tournament championships.

=== Golf ===
The Jaguars men's and women's golf teams began in fall 2010. The squads practice and host meets at Victoria Country Club and The Club at Colony Creek. Head coach is Christi Cano, former All-American at Oklahoma State University and LPGA tour player.

== Notable alumni ==
- Van G. Garrett, poet
- Chad Waligura, journalist
- Alan Weddell, college football coach
