= University of South Florida St. Petersburg =

Public university in St. Petersburg, Florida, U.S.

Coordinates: 27°45′47.20″N 82°38′3.94″W

- Former name: University of South Florida Bay Campus (1965–75)
- Motto: "Truth and Wisdom"
- Established: 1965
- Parent institution: University of South Florida
- Chancellor: Christian Hardigree
- Undergraduates: 3,818
- Postgraduates: 510
- Location: St. Petersburg, Florida, United States
- Campus: Urban 52 acres (0.2 km^{2})
- Colors: Green and Gold
- Nickname: Bulls
- Mascot: Rocky the Bull
- Website: www.stpetersburg.usf.edu

The University of South Florida St. Petersburg campus is a campus of the University of South Florida in St. Petersburg, Florida. Opened in 1965 as a satellite campus of the University of South Florida, it was consolidated with the other two USF campuses (Tampa and Sarasota-Manatee) as of July 1, 2020. USF's St. Petersburg campus is the only public university in Pinellas County. The campus enrolled 4,455 students during the fall 2019 semester.

== History ==
In 1965, the University of South Florida created a satellite campus in downtown St. Petersburg, Florida, the "Bay Campus," the University of South Florida St. Petersburg. The campus opened in the fall of 1965 to 257 freshman. In 1967, USF St. Petersburg organized the USF Marine Science Program. In that same year, the Florida Institute of Oceanography opened facilities on land leased from the University of South Florida St. Petersburg. In 1969, USF St. Petersburg opened its library with 2,248 volumes and offered its first degrees to 51 graduates of elementary education program. In that same year, a State Legislature passed bill establishing USF St. Petersburg as a branch of the University of South Florida. By 1981, USF St. Petersburg had completed its first stage of expansion with the addition of Bayboro Hall. In 1984, Coquina Hall opened its doors. In 1990, the Campus Activities Center opened its doors. In 2005, USF St. Petersburg celebrated its 40th anniversary and the groundbreaking for Residence Hall One. In 2006, USF St. Petersburg was accredited as a separate entity from the University of South Florida. In that same year, the University of South Florida St. Petersburg opened its new student residence hall, Residence Hall One, to house future and returning students.

In 2020, USF St. Petersburg was consolidated with the other two USF campuses. This meant that USFSP was no longer a separate university under the University of South Florida system and all three campuses were now effectively one university geographically distributed.

On May 2, 2026, a fire broke out at the St. Petersburg campuses' Marine Science Laboratory, and according to university officials, the combined water and fire damage likely caused a total loss of the laboratory. Up to 200 firefighters, including specialized teams who deal with hazardous materials, responded to the fire. Two days later, the fire reignited, but was again put out by fire fighters. The fire is believed to have been sparked by a lightning strike on the building, but the exact cause remains under investigation.

== Academics ==
Having been a satellite campus of the University of South Florida for the first 40 years of its existence, the University of South Florida St. Petersburg gained autonomy and was accredited as a separate entity within the University of South Florida system by the Southern Association of Colleges and Schools starting with the 2006–2007 school year. Accreditation allows the University of South Florida St. Petersburg to award bachelor's and master's degrees. The College of Business and the Program of Accountancy are both accredited by the Association to Advance Collegiate Schools of Business (AACSB) International. Less than one-third of U.S. business school programs, fewer than 15 percent of business school programs worldwide meet the rigorous standards for AACSB accreditation. Only 180 institutions worldwide are separately accredited in accounting.

The Department of Journalism and Media Studies is accredited by the Accrediting Council on Education in Journalism and Mass Communications (ACEJMC), and it is the only journalism program in the central and south Florida area that has both undergraduate and graduate degree programs accredited.

== Athletics ==
USFSP has athletic club teams in many sports including baseball, basketball, sailing, soccer, and more.

=== USF Sailing Team ===
The Bulls sailing program is a nationally recognized team and is coached by Allison Jolly, gold medalist in the first Olympic women's sailing event at the 1988 Summer Olympics in Seoul. As sailing is not an American Athletic Conference or NCAA sanctioned sport, USF is a member of the South Atlantic Intercollegiate Sailing Conference within the Inter-Collegiate Sailing Association. The team has a waterfront facility on Bayboro Harbor on USFSP's campus called the Haney Landing Sailing Center. It is the only varsity sport based on USF's St. Petersburg campus and started as a popular club team in the early 1990s before earning varsity status from the USF Athletic Department in 1997.

The USF sailing team won the Inter-Collegiate Sailing Association Sloop National Championship in 2009 and back to back ICSA Offshore Large Boats National Championships in 2016 and 2017. They were national runners-up at the ICSA Singlehanded National Championships in 2009 and 2011. The Bulls represented the United States in the 2017 and 2018 Student Yachting World Cups.

== Nelson Poynter Memorial Library ==
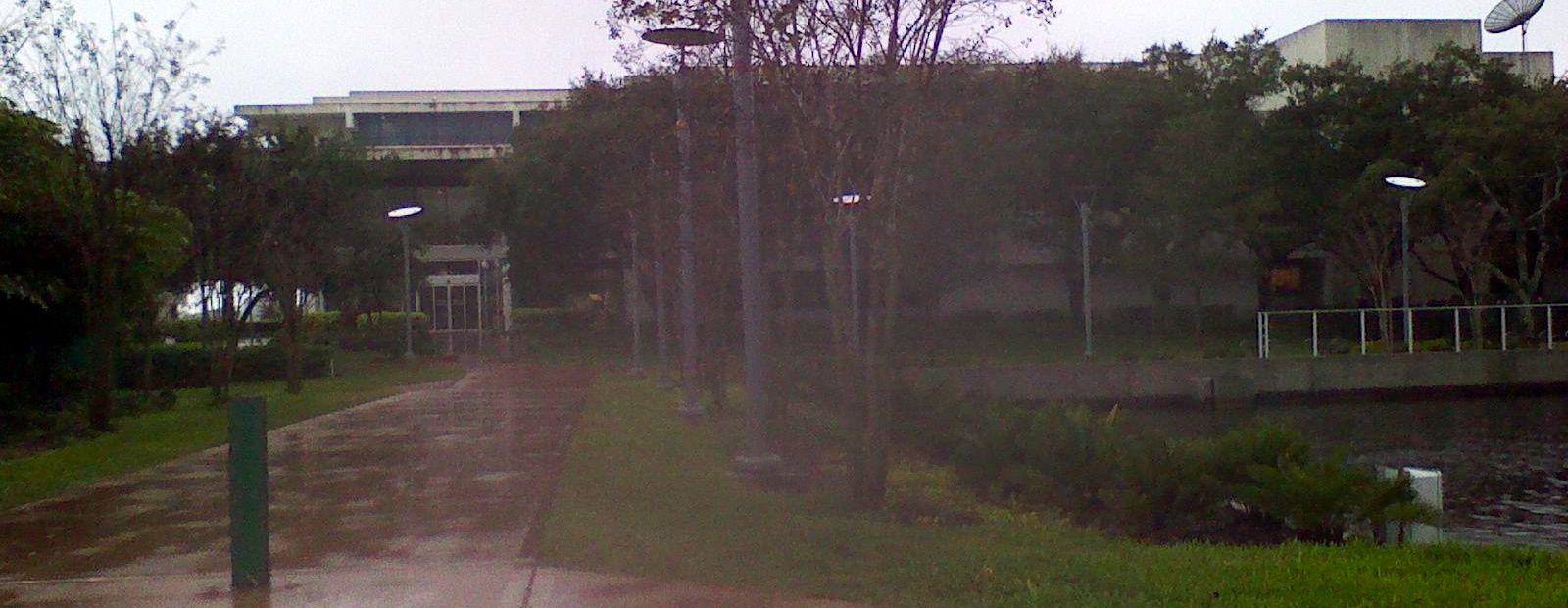
Nelson Poynter Memorial Library, on the St. Petersburg campus of the University of South Florida.

The Nelson Poynter Memorial Library opened in 1996 to commemorate Nelson Poynter. The Nelson Poynter Memorial Library, serving the University of South Florida's St. Petersburg community, is an inviting place for students, faculty, and campus visitors to read, relax, research, or study.

The Nelson Poynter Library has over a 200,000 volume collection featuring business, education, liberal arts, and marine science. Literature selections range from classics such as Herman Melville's Moby-Dick to the latest award-winning novels. A children's collection features juvenile and young adult books.

The Poynter Library's Special Collections department has rare books, oral histories, and local history photographs and documents. Notable collections include the John C. Briggs Collection of Ichthyology and Natural History, the David Hubbell Mark Twain Collection, the Miller Family Collection of Presidential Signatures and Documents, and the Papers of Nelson Poynter.

The library subscribes to more than 800 periodicals and newspapers, including Science, The Economist, Foreign Affairs, and local and national newspapers. Over 10,000 electronic journals and newspapers augmenting these print collections are accessible through the library's on the wireless network or on computers in the library's information commons.

In 1950, when the Merchant Marine training base at Bayboro Harbor was deactivated, Nelson Poynter started a campaign to persuade the City of St. Petersburg to donate the land to the state. Poynter committed himself to donate $500,000 to help buy additional land for expansion and was the principal contributor and fundraiser for the first St. Petersburg campus library. On June 15, 1978, Nelson Poynter, his wife Marion, business and civic leaders, educators, and students took turns with eight gold-painted shovels to break ground for the first phase expansion of the campus. A few hours later, Nelson Poynter suffered a cerebral hemorrhage. Poynter died that same evening. That library would become Bayboro Hall, the Nelson Poynter Memorial Library would open in 1996 in his name.

== Student media ==
=== The Crow's Nest ===
The Crow's Nest is a student-run newspaper circulated in USF's St. Petersburg campus that was first published in 1969. The newspaper is published in the fall and spring semesters, and contains news stories, features, and entertainment pieces that are of interest to students and the campus community. Over time, the paper grew substantially to match the expanding campus. The newspaper now distributes 800 copies of the paper every Monday on campus and also publishes stories online via their website. Since the spring of 2005, The Crow's Nest has been published on a weekly basis. The Crow's Nest is funded each semester by a portion of revenue generated from Activities and Services fees as well as advertising revenue.

== Campus life ==
The majority of activities involving students are officially the responsibility of the Division of Student Affairs, but the Student Government Association has become the sole funding source of Student Life, Campus Reservations and New Student Orientation. In April 2006, Student Government opened a new volleyball and basketball courts facility on campus.

=== Student Success Center ===
The Student Success Center was created to help students achieve their educational goals.

=== Student life ===
The Department of Student Life & Engagement and the Student Life Center work together to allow for opportunities for students to learn outside of class. The Student Life Center is located on the same street as Residence Hall One and is across the street from the campus. It houses the fitness center which a weight and cardio room, recreation areas, aerobics area, locker rooms, and basketball, and volleyball.

=== Harborside Activities Board ===
The Harborside Activities Board is the campus programming board, which plans and implements educational, cultural, and social co-curricular activities for the USF St. Petersburg campus.

== Student housing ==
=== Pelican Hall ===
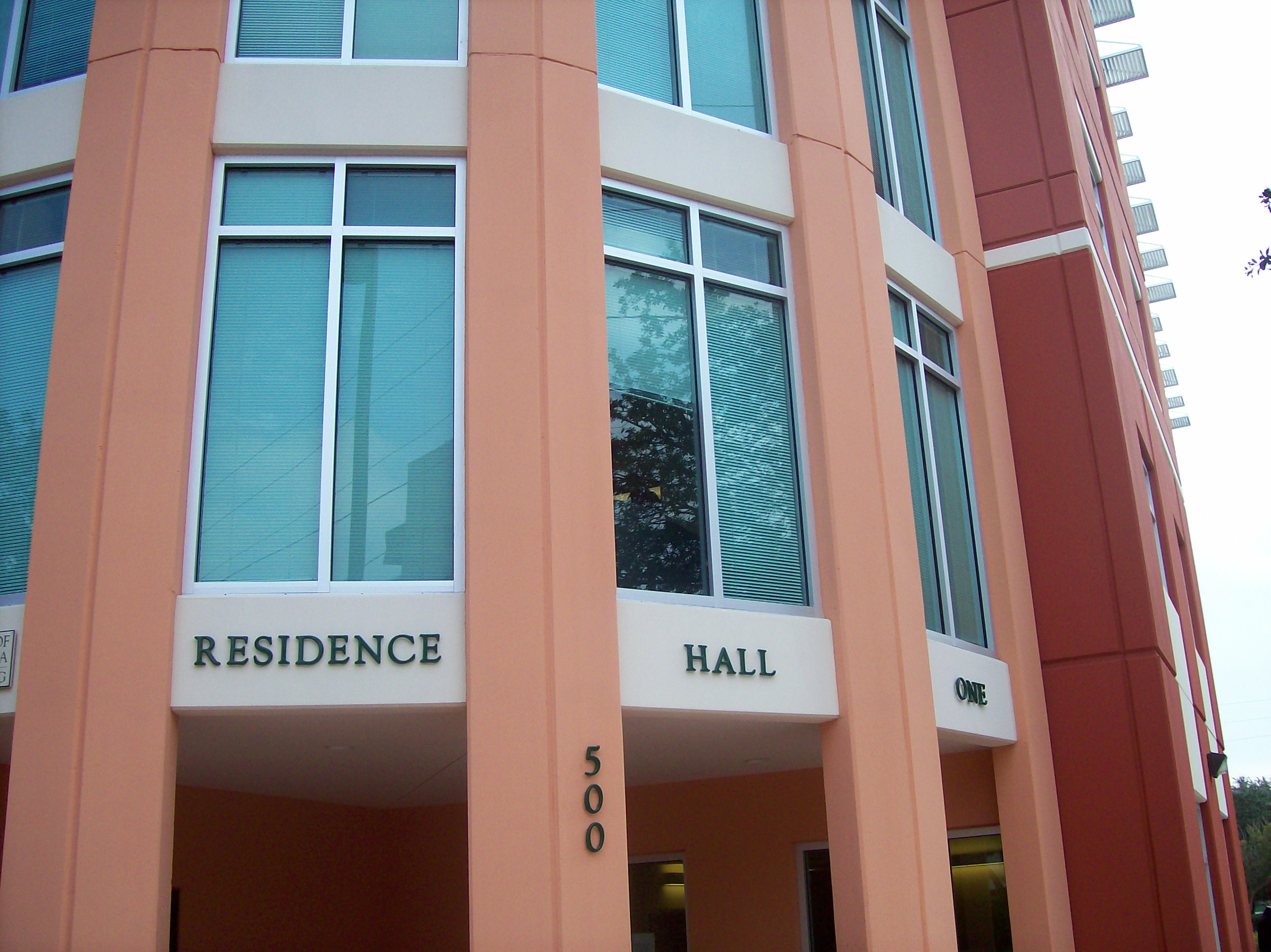
The University of South Florida St. Petersburg's Residence Hall One is a seven-story building that can house 354 students in 95 apartments.

To accommodate extra students and students wishing to pursue a degree full-time on campus, USF St. Petersburg built a residence hall, Residence Hall One. First year students who live 30 miles or farther from the USFSP campus are required to live In Residence Hall One. Residence Hall One is located across the street from the campus. Students can easily walk to class, the gym, parking garage and Campus Activity Center, located on the same street as Residence Hall One. Students wishing to live in Residence Hall One can choose from any of two suites. Residence Hall One also offers its students a sense of community in an already welcoming university. Every floor has a Resident Assistant to monitor, help, and organize meetings for the students. Residence Hall One is also the University of South Florida St. Petersburg's first student dormitory since Merchant Marine training bases were used as dormitories for students.

USF St. Petersburg officially opened the doors to Residence Hall One on August 23, 2006, for the Fall semester. Residence Hall One is a seven-story building that can house 354 students in 95 apartments that contain four-person double bedrooms, four-person single bedrooms, and one two-person apartment with single bedrooms. Each apartment contains two bathrooms, a living room and kitchen with garbage disposal, refrigerator and microwave. All utilities are included; electricity, water, heat and air conditioning, local telephone service, high speed Internet and cable TV. Every floor in Residence Hall One has a laundry room and lounge. Lounges are equipped with furniture and a high-definition television with cable TV. Resident students can also park their cars in the seven-story parking garage across the street built at the same time as Residence Hall One.

A $1,500 Sails Scholarship was offered to students who moved into Residence Hall One during its first year open. Residence Hall One also offers its students beautiful views of Tampa Bay and downtown St. Petersburg. Students are in close range of supermarkets, movie theaters and restaurants. The Student Government Safe Team transported students while patrolling the campus parking lots and buildings and facilities until the program was ended in 2010. The University of South Florida St. Petersburg has on-campus police to safeguard the campus, students, and parking garage. Residence Hall One is the University of South Florida St. Petersburg's first step in its second phase of expansion. 2007 was the first year that USF St. Petersburg was able to house incoming freshman during the summer semester during their summer program.

On January 15th, 2020, Regional Chancellor Martin Tadlock announced that Residence Hall One would be renamed to Pelican Hall.

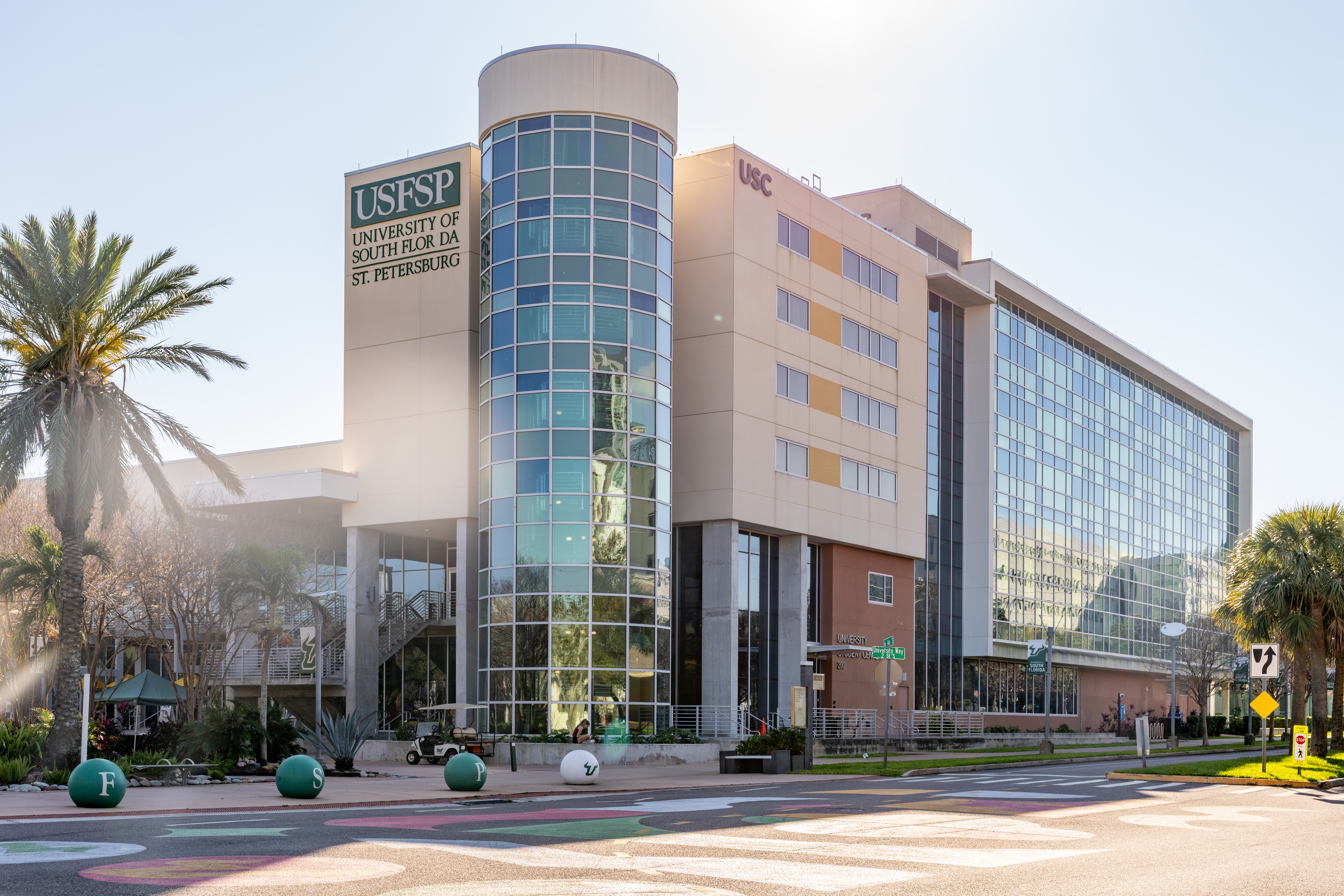
Ibis Hall (2025)

=== Ibis Hall ===
The university launched its 81,00 square foot University Student Center on September 6, 2012. The $21 million facility was partly financed with a special student fee passed by the Florida Legislature and supported by students who saw a need for a central gathering place at USFSP. The building, 200 Sixth Avenue South, opened August 25, 2012 when 200 residential students moved into rooms in the six-story residential tower. Besides student housing, the building also includes a dining hall called The Reef that is open to the public serving breakfast, lunch and dinner seven days a week. It offers the first full-service meal plans for USFSP. The center also includes an atrium lobby, wireless internet, laundry facilities, a student lounge, seating areas and two outdoor basketball courts.

The 75-ft building was designed by Rowe Architects of Tampa and built by Creative Contractors of Clearwater. Among its architectural features is a 65-ft multi-colored glass-enclosed circular staircase for the residential tower, and an 8,000 sq. ft. curtain of glass along 6th Avenue South. The residential tower brings the total number of residential students to nearly 650, a record number in the university's history. Many of the rooms in the residential tower offer views of Tampa Bay and the downtown St. Petersburg skyline.

On January 15th, 2020, Regional Chancellor Martin Tadlock announced the residences at the University Student Center would be renamed to Ibis Hall.

=== Osprey Hall ===
USF St Petersburg opened its third, 125,000 square-foot residence hall on August 17th, 2020.

== Notable faculty ==
- Raymond Arsenault, historian and author
- Deni Elliott, professor in Department of Journalism and Media Studies and Eleanor Poynter Jamison Chair in Media Ethics and Press Policy
- Christian Hardigree, chancellor
- Gary Mormino, Frank E. Duckwall Professor of History and co-director of the Florida Studies Program

== See also ==
- Poynter Institute
- Salvador Dalí Museum
- Albert Whitted Airport
- USGS Center for Coastal Geology
- The Florida Marine Research Institute
