= Glidden =

Glidden may refer to:

== Places ==
=== Canada ===
- Glidden, Saskatchewan, a hamlet

=== United States ===
- Glidden, Iowa, a city
- Glidden Township, Carroll County, Iowa, a township
- Glidden, Texas, an unincorporated community
- Glidden, Wisconsin, an unincorporated community

== Other uses ==
- Glidden (surname)
- Glidden (paints), a paint manufacturing company

== See also ==
- Glidden Tour
