= Glidden (surname) =

Glidden is a surname. Notable people with the surname include:

- Bob Glidden (1944–2017), American drag racer
- Carlos Glidden (1834–1877), American typewriter inventor
- Charles Jasper Glidden (1857–1927), American telephone pioneer
- David Glidden (born 1994 or 1995), American politician
- Edward Hughes Glidden (1873–1924), American architect
- Elizabeth Glidden, American lawyer and Minneapolis politician
- Francis Harrington Glidden (1832–1922), American businessman
- Freddie Glidden (1927–2019), Scottish footballer
- Gilbert Glidden (1915–1988), English footballer
- Henry Orange Glidden (1891–1978), American architect and artist
- Joseph Glidden (1813–1906), American barbed wire inventor
- Joy Glidden (born 1960), Canadian American art curator
- Sarah Glidden (born 1980), American cartoonist
- Tommy Glidden (1902–1974), English footballer
- William T. Glidden (1805–1893), American sea captain and shipping line owner
