= Bo Schobel =

American football player (born 1981)

No. 95, 64, 99
- Position: Defensive end

Personal information
- Born: March 24, 1981 (age 45); Columbus, Texas, U.S.
- Listed height: 6 ft 5 in (1.96 m)
- Listed weight: 264 lb (120 kg)

Career information
- High school: Columbus
- College: TCU (1999–2003)
- NFL draft: 2004: 4th round, 103rd overall pick

Career history
- Tennessee Titans (2004–2005); Indianapolis Colts (2006); Arizona Cardinals (2007); Jacksonville Jaguars (2008)*; Florida Tuskers (2009)*
- * Offseason or practice squad member only

Awards and highlights
- Super Bowl champion (XLI); Second-team All-American (2003); 2× First-team All-Conference USA (2002–2003)

Career NFL statistics
- Total tackles: 45
- Sacks: 1.5
- Forced fumbles: 1
- Stats at Pro Football Reference

Robert Edward "Bo" Schobel (/ˈʃoʊbəl/; born March 24, 1981) is an American former professional football player who was a defensive end in the National Football League (NFL). He played college football for the TCU Horned Frogs and was selected by the Tennessee Titans in the fourth round of the 2004 NFL draft with the 103rd overall pick.

Schobel was also a member of the Indianapolis Colts, Arizona Cardinals, Jacksonville Jaguars, and Florida Tuskers. He earned a Super Bowl ring with the Colts in Super Bowl XLI, beating the Chicago Bears.

== Professional career ==
=== Florida Tuskers ===
On August 17, 2009, Schobel was signed by the Florida Tuskers of the United Football League.

== Personal life ==
He is the cousin of former Philadelphia Eagles tight end Matt Schobel and former Buffalo Bills defensive end Aaron Schobel.

Bo has a wife, Lyndsay Schobel, and four kids. Their names are Dayne, Lainey, Gracie, and Lucy.

Bo talked to the J.R. Broncos team from the Texas Youth Football Association (TYFA) during an episode of Esquire Network's "Friday Night Tykes".
