= Matt Schobel =

American football player (born 1978)

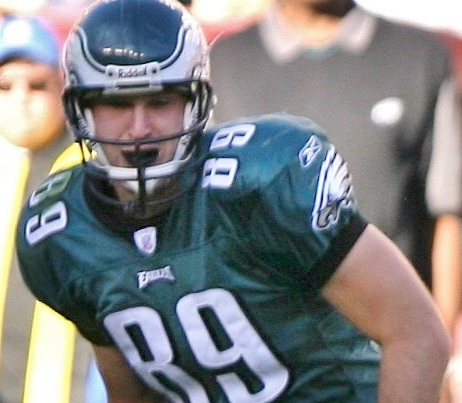
- Schobel with the Philadelphia Eagles in 2006

No. 89
- Position: Tight end

Personal information
- Born: November 4, 1978 (age 48); Columbus, Texas, U.S.
- Listed height: 6 ft 5 in (1.96 m)
- Listed weight: 263 lb (119 kg)

Career information
- High school: Columbus
- College: Texas Christian
- NFL draft: 2002: 3rd round, 67th overall pick

Career history
- Cincinnati Bengals (2002–2005); Philadelphia Eagles (2006–2008)

Career NFL statistics
- Receptions: 117
- Receiving yards: 1,270
- Receiving average: 10.9
- Receiving touchdowns: 12
- Stats at Pro Football Reference

Matthew Thomas Schobel (/ˈʃoʊbəl/; born November 4, 1978) is an American former professional football player who was a tight end in the National Football League (NFL). He was selected by the Cincinnati Bengals in the third round of the 2002 NFL draft. He played college football for the TCU Horned Frogs (TCU).

Schobel was also a member of the Philadelphia Eagles. Matt is the younger brother of former defensive end Aaron Schobel and the cousin of former defensive end Bo Schobel.

== Early life ==
Schobel attended Columbus High School in Columbus, Texas. He played football there as a quarterback. He was 2nd leg in 4 x 100 meter relay team, as well as an excellent basketball player known for dunking.

== College career ==
Schobel originally signed with Texas A&M as a quarterback in 1997. He was redshirted as a freshman, and decided to transfer to Texas Christian University, sitting out the 1998 season per NCAA transfer rules. Due to his size and surprising quickness and mobility, he was converted to tight end in 2000 and played three seasons (1999–2001) at Texas Christian University.

== Professional career ==
=== Cincinnati Bengals ===
Schobel was selected by the Cincinnati Bengals in the third round, with the 67th overall pick, of the 2002 NFL draft.

Schobel played four years with the Bengals where he tallied 90 receptions for 938 yards and nine touchdowns.

=== Philadelphia Eagles ===
In 2006, Schobel became an unrestricted free agent and signed a five-year contract with the Philadelphia Eagles.

Through 2008, Schobel had seen action in 36 games, starting 11. He had 27 receptions for 332 yards and three touchdowns. He was released on September 5, 2009.

== NFL career statistics ==
Legend
**Bold**	Career high

=== Regular season ===
Year	Team	Games		Receiving					
Year	Team	GP	GS	Tgt	Rec	Yds	Avg	Lng	TD
2002	CIN	16	10	**36**	**27**	212	7.9	20	2
2003	CIN	15	1	30	24	**332**	13.8	45	2
2004	CIN	16	1	33	21	201	9.6	**76**	**4**
2005	CIN	16	1	25	18	193	10.7	28	1
2006	PHI	16	4	20	14	214	**15.3**	60	2
2007	PHI	15	6	21	11	108	9.8	18	1
2008	PHI	5	1	3	2	10	5.0	5	0
		99	24	168	117	1,270	10.9	76	12

=== Postseason ===
Year	Team	Games		Receiving					
Year	Team	GP	GS	Tgt	Rec	Yds	Avg	Lng	TD
2005	CIN	1	0	**2**	**2**	**11**	5.5	**8**	0
2006	PHI	2	1	**2**	**2**	**11**	5.5	6	0
2008	PHI	1	0	**2**	1	7	**7.0**	7	0
		4	1	6	5	29	5.8	8	0

== Coaching career ==
Schobel is currently the head coach and athletics director of his high school alma mater, the Columbus High School Cardinals.
