= LaAdrian Waddle =

American football player (born 1991)

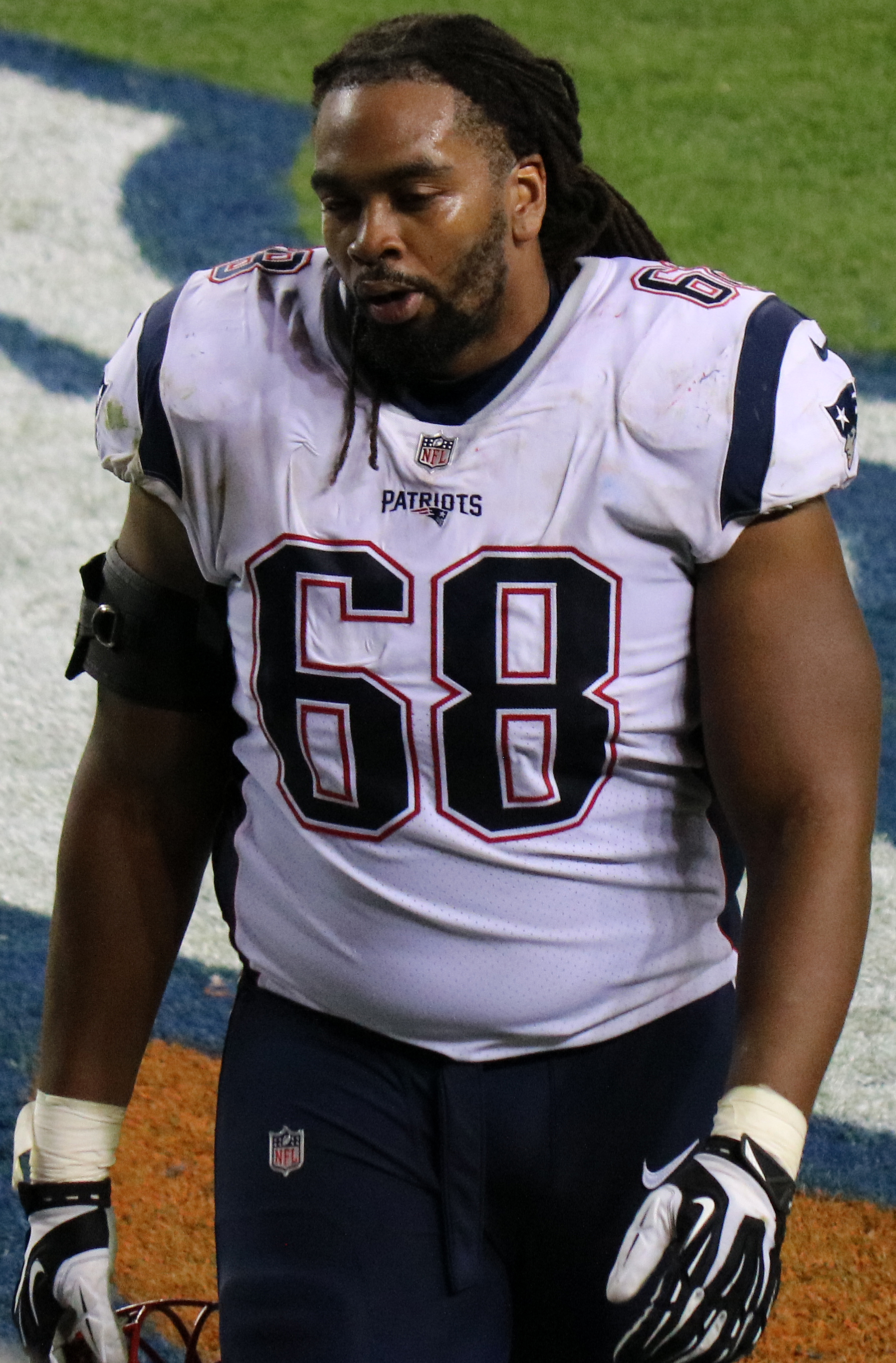
- Waddle with the New England Patriots in 2017

No. 74, 66, 68
- Position: Offensive tackle

Personal information
- Born: July 21, 1991 (age 35); Columbus, Texas, U.S.
- Listed height: 6 ft 6 in (1.98 m)
- Listed weight: 315 lb (143 kg)

Career information
- High school: Columbus
- College: Texas Tech
- NFL draft: 2013: undrafted

Career history
- Detroit Lions (2013–2015); New England Patriots (2015–2018); Buffalo Bills (2019)

Awards and highlights
- 2× Super Bowl champion (LI, LIII); First-team All-Big 12 (2012); Second-team All-Big 12 (2011)

Career NFL statistics
- Games played: 61
- Games started: 31
- Stats at Pro Football Reference

LaAdrian Waddle (born July 21, 1991) is an American former professional football player who was an offensive tackle in the National Football League (NFL). He played college football for the Texas Tech Red Raiders.

== Early life ==
A native of Columbus, Texas, Waddle attended Columbus High School where he was coached by Brent Mascheck. The Columbus Cardinals finished 5–4 in Waddle's senior year and did not make the UIL playoffs. Behind Waddle pulling and clearing the way for the running back, the Cardinals averaged 281.0 rushing yards per game with 26 rushing touchdowns on the season.

Regarded as a three-star recruit by Rivals.com, Waddle was ranked as the No. 74 offensive guard prospect nationally in a class that also included Jonotthan Harrison, Corey Linsley, and Chance Warmack. Waddle was not heavily recruited, receiving offers from Tulane, Rice, Houston, and SMU. He planned on going to nearby Houston until Texas Tech recruited him.

== College career ==
Playing from 2009–12 for Texas Tech, Waddle earned several honors. During his sophomore year, Waddle received All-Big 12 Conference honorable mention honors as well as an Academic All-Big 12 2nd Team selection. In the following year in 2011, Waddle was named an All-Big 12 Conference 2nd Team selection before being bumped to a 1st Team selection following the 2012 season.

== Professional career ==
=== Detroit Lions ===
On April 27, 2013, he signed with the Detroit Lions as an undrafted free agent. Despite being undrafted, Waddle unseated Jason Curtis Fox and Corey Hilliard as the Detroit Lions starting right tackle by week eight of his rookie season. He had taken over the job after Hilliard was injured in a week 7 loss to the Cincinnati Bengals.

Waddle was injured in the 2014 season and went through off-season knee surgery. He was cut by the Lions on December 15, 2015.

=== New England Patriots ===
The New England Patriots claimed Waddle off waivers on December 16, 2015.

Waddle was re-signed to a two-year deal on March 9, 2016. In the 2016 season, Waddle was inactive for all but two games and played only one offensive snap.

On February 5, 2017, Waddle's Patriots appeared in Super Bowl LI. He was inactive for the game as the Patriots defeated the Atlanta Falcons by a score of 34–28 in overtime.

In 2017, Waddle played in 12 games with four starts at right tackle in place of the injured Marcus Cannon. Waddle and the Patriots made it to Super Bowl LII, but the Patriots lost 41-33 to the Philadelphia Eagles.

On March 22, 2018, Waddle re-signed with the Patriots. He played in all 16 games, starting three at right tackle in place of an injured Marcus Cannon. Waddle won his second Super Bowl when the Patriots defeated the Los Angeles Rams 13–3 in Super Bowl LIII.

=== Buffalo Bills ===
On March 16, 2019, Waddle signed a one-year contract with the Buffalo Bills. On August 4, Waddle suffered a quadriceps injury and was carted off the field during a training camp scrimmage. It was revealed that he suffered a torn quad and was placed on injured reserve two days later, ending his season.
