= Rock Island, Colorado County, Texas =

Rock Island, Texas
- Unincorporated community Census-designated place
- Location within the state of Texas Rock Island (the United States)
- Coordinates: 29°31′52″N 96°34′31″W
- Country: United States
- State: Texas
- County: Colorado

Area
  - Total: 5.05 sq mi (13.08 km^{2})
  - Land: 5.02 sq mi (12.99 km^{2})
  - Water: 0.035 sq mi (0.09 km^{2})
- Elevation: 246 ft (75 m)
- Time zone: UTC-6 (Central (CST))
  - Summer (DST): UTC-5 (CDT)
- ZIP code: 77470
- Area code: 979

Rock Island is an unincorporated community and census-designated place (CDP) in Colorado County, Texas, United States. According to the Handbook of Texas, the community had an estimated population of 160 in 2000.

== Geography ==
Rock Island is situated along U.S. Highway 90A in Colorado County, approximately 12 miles southwest of Columbus and 15 miles west of Eagle Lake

== Demographics ==
Historical population
Census	Pop.	Note	%±
2020	228		—
U.S. Decennial Census; 1850–1900 1910; 1920 1930 1940; 1950 1960 1970; 1980 1990 2000; 2010 2020

Rock Island first appeared as a census-designated place in the 2020 U.S. census.

=== 2020 census ===
Rock Island CDP, Texas – Racial and ethnic composition Note: the US Census treats Hispanic/Latino as an ethnic category. This table excludes Latinos from the racial categories and assigns them to a separate category. Hispanics/Latinos may be of any race.
Race / Ethnicity (NH = Non-Hispanic)	Pop 2020	% 2020
White alone (NH)	153	67.11%
Black or African American alone (NH)	9	3.95%
Native American or Alaska Native alone (NH)	0	0.00%
Asian alone (NH)	0	0.00%
Native Hawaiian or Pacific Islander alone (NH)	0	0.00%
Other race alone (NH)	1	0.44%
Mixed race or Multiracial (NH)	9	3.95%
Hispanic or Latino (any race)	56	24.56%
Total	228	100.00%

== History ==
The area was settled in 1896 as part of a land promotion scheme on the Texas and New Orleans Railroad. The survey and map of the community was completed on February 19, 1896. Initially known as Crasco, after nearby Crasco Creek, citizens petitioned the post office department to change the name to Rock Island in 1897. The petition was granted and Charles Petersen was appointed the first postmaster of Rock Island on August 9, 1897. Dueling realtors' intent on outselling each other recruited land-buyers from Illinois, Iowa, and Missouri, promising a "tropical paradise" near the Gulf of Mexico. By 1904, Rock Island had a population of 367. In July 1909 a hurricane made landfall near present-day Freeport. The storm passed over Rock Island with winds estimated to be around 75 mph. Several downtown structures, including a bank, were destroyed. The population of Rock Island peaked in 1925 at around 500. In the 1960s, the community suffered several fires that left large gaps in the former downtown. The number of inhabitants had fallen to 160 by the mid-1980s. It remained at that level through 2000.

Rock Island has a post office with the ZIP code 77470.

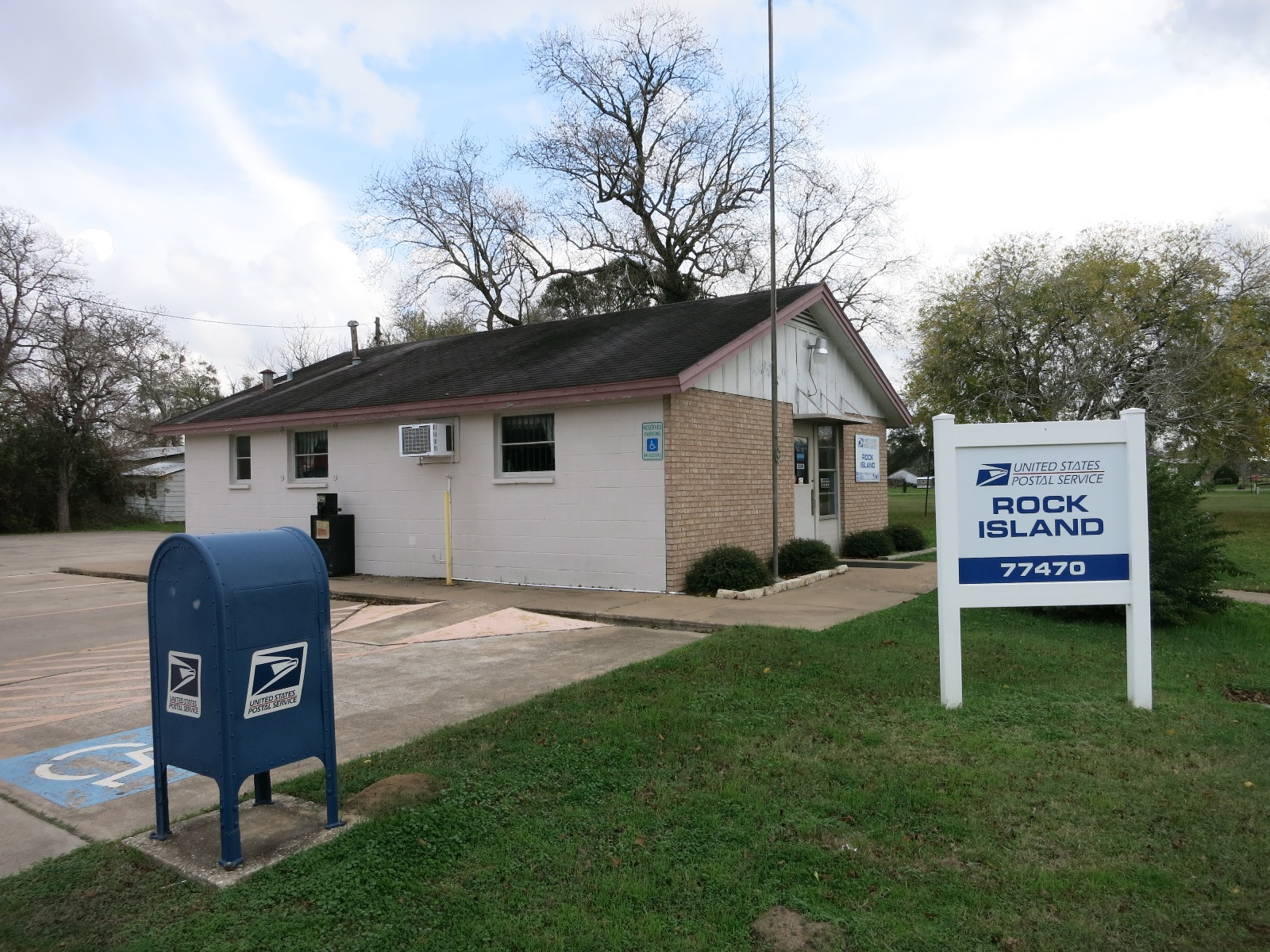
The Rock Island US Post Office is at 1st and Tuttle Streets.

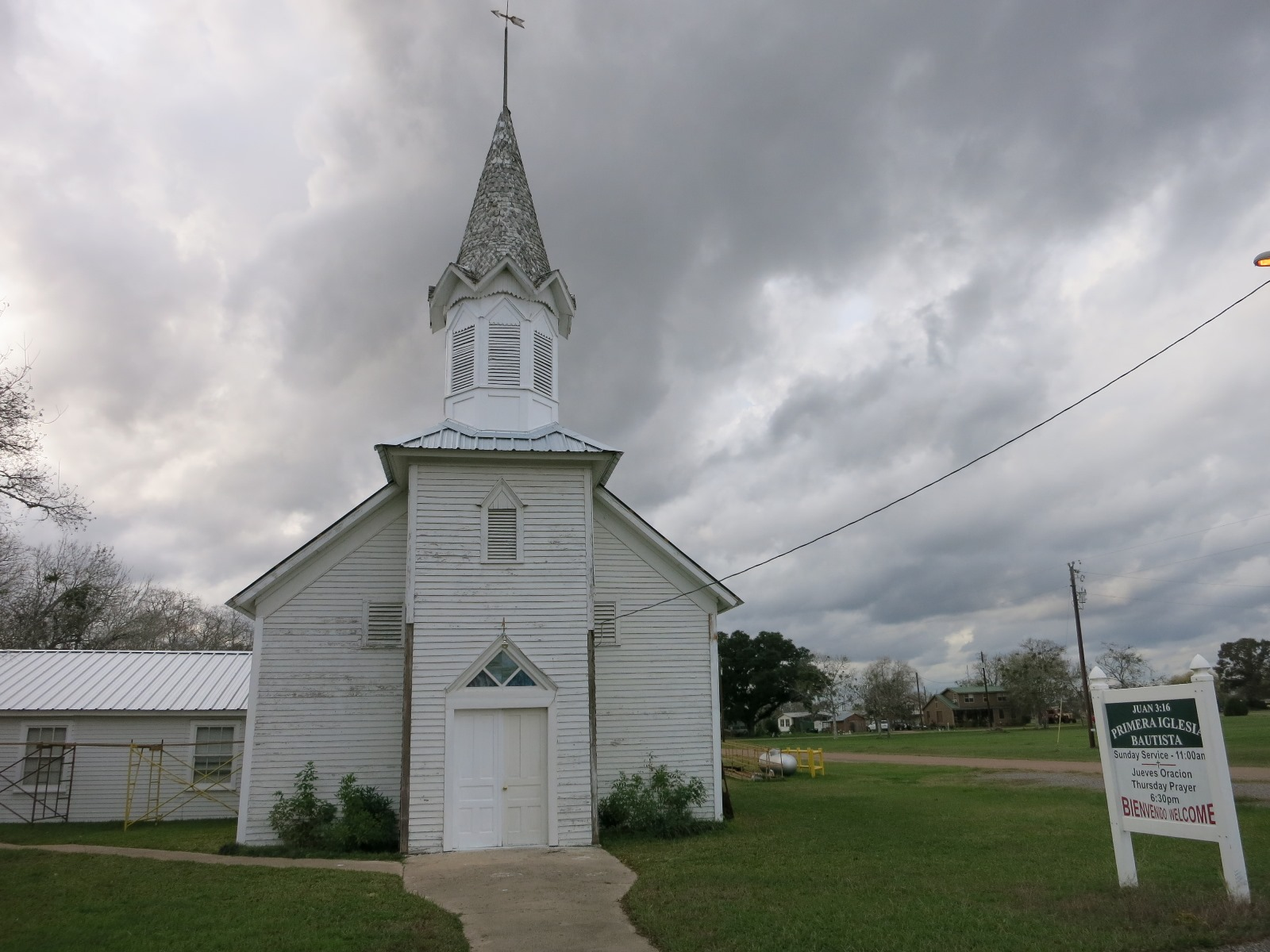
There is a Spanish language Baptist Church at 3rd and Cushen Streets.

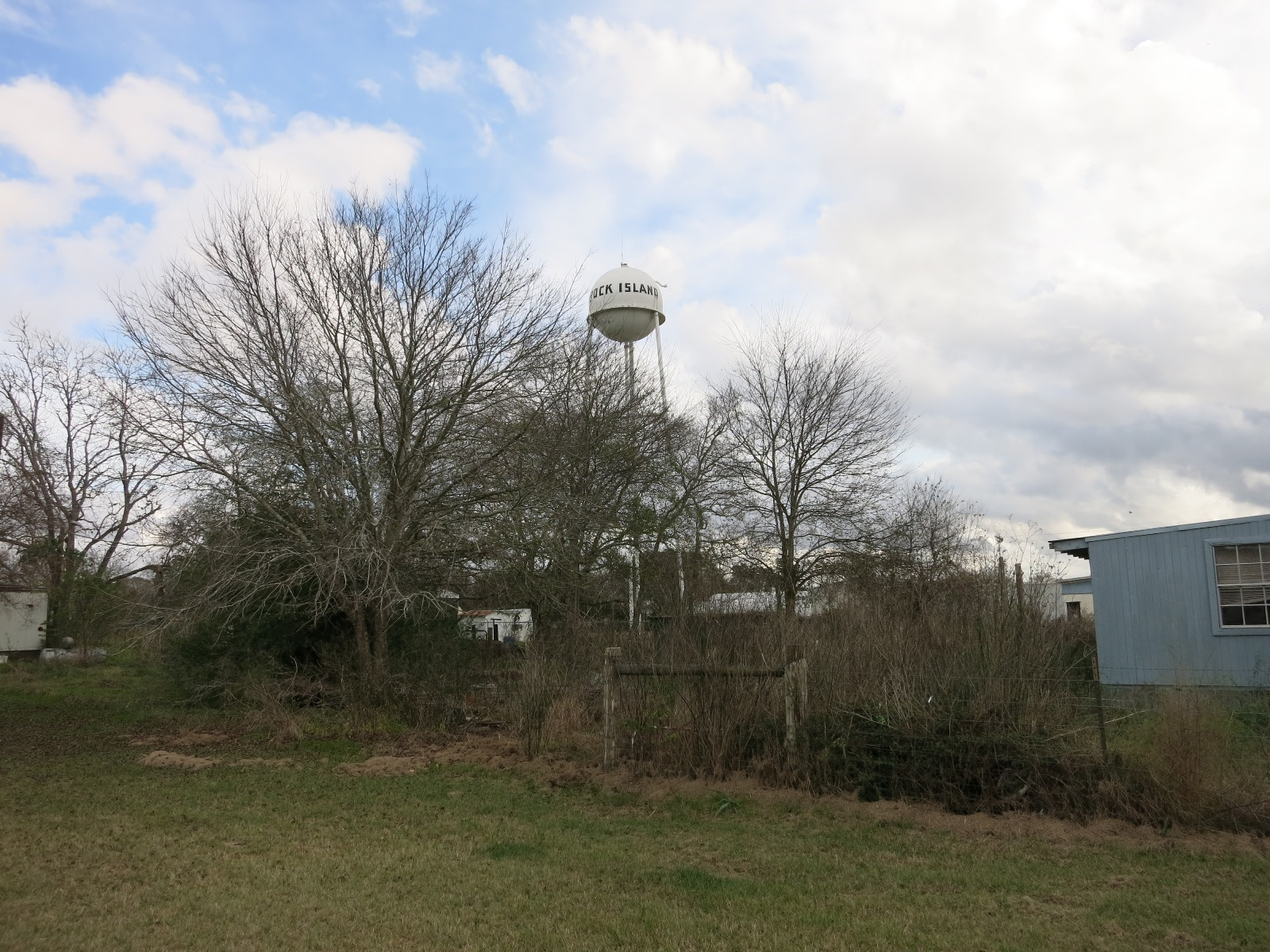
Rock Island has a water tower at CR 106 and 4th Street.

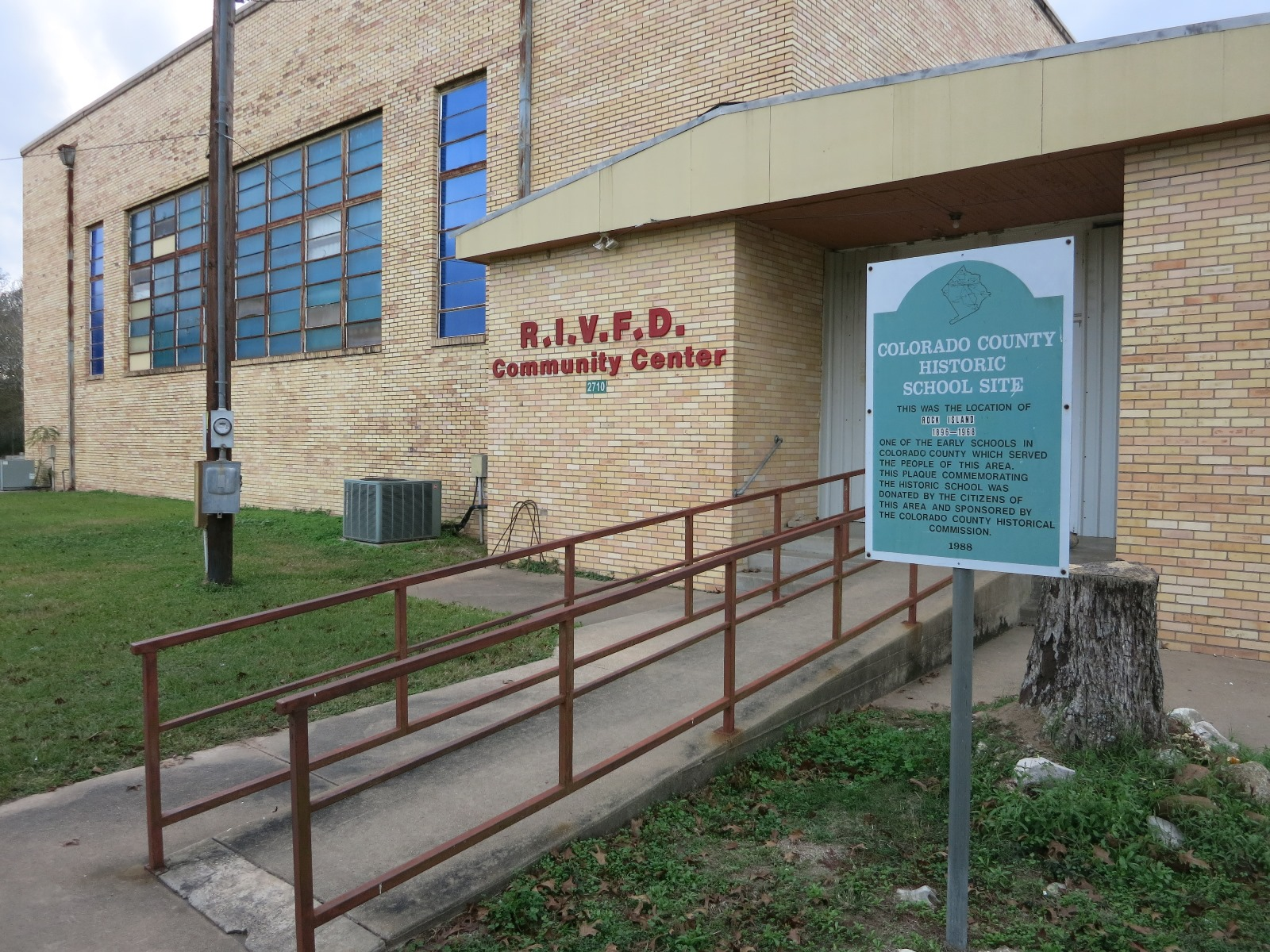
The Rock Island Volunteer Fire Department is housed in a former school.

== Education ==
Public education in much of the CDP of Rock Island is provided by the Columbus Independent School District. Portions extend into the Rice Consolidated Independent School District. Columbus High School is the comprehensive high school of the former, and Rice High School is the comprehensive high school of the latter.

The Texas Legislature assigns areas in Columbus and Rice Consolidated ISDs to Wharton County Junior College.
