= Aaron Schobel =

American football player (born 1977)

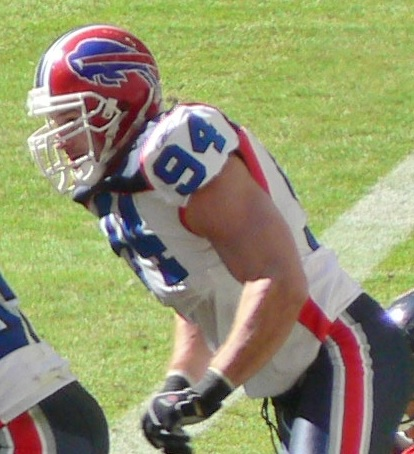
- Schobel with the Buffalo Bills in 2006

No. 94
- Position: Defensive end

Personal information
- Born: September 1, 1977 (age 49); Harris County, Texas, U.S.
- Listed height: 6 ft 4 in (1.93 m)
- Listed weight: 243 lb (110 kg)

Career information
- High school: Columbus (Columbus, Texas)
- College: TCU (1996–2000)
- NFL draft: 2001: 2nd round, 46th overall pick

Career history
- Buffalo Bills (2001–2009)

Awards and highlights
- Second-team All-Pro (2006); 2× Pro Bowl (2006, 2007); WAC Defensive Player of the Year (2000); 2× First-team All-WAC (1999, 2000)

Career NFL statistics
- Total tackles: 483
- Sacks: 78
- Forced fumbles: 21
- Fumble recoveries: 8
- Interceptions: 3
- Defensive touchdowns: 1
- Stats at Pro Football Reference

Aaron Ross Schobel (/ˈʃoʊbəl/; born September 1, 1977) is an American former professional football player who was a defensive end for the Buffalo Bills of the National Football League (NFL). Schobel played college football for the TCU Horned Frogs. He was selected by Buffalo in the second round (46th overall) of the 2001 NFL draft, and he played his entire nine-season career for the Bills. Schobel is notable for recording more sacks of New England Patriots quarterback Tom Brady than any other NFL player.

== Early life ==
Schobel attended Columbus High School. While there, he was a two-time All-District-22-3A selection, at both tight end and outside linebacker. As a senior, he had 105 tackles and during his final two years, he posted 70 receptions for 1,299 yards (18.55 yards per rec. avg.).

== College career ==
Schobel attended Texas Christian University, where he played for the TCU Horned Frogs football team from 1997 to 2000. He received first-team All-Western Athletic Conference (WAC) honors in 1999 and 2000, and was the WAC Defensive Player of the Year as a senior in 2000.

== Professional career ==
Pre-draft measurables
Height	Weight	40-yard dash	20-yard shuttle	Three-cone drill	Vertical jump	Broad jump
6 ft 4 in (1.93 m)	263 lb (119 kg)	4.75 s	4.03 s	7.16 s	38 in (0.97 m)	9 ft 11 in (3.02 m)
All values from NFL Combine.

Schobel earned his first Pro Bowl appearance in 2006. His best season as a pro came in 2006 when he posted a career high 14 sacks. Since the 2001 season he ranks second in total sacks, only behind Jason Taylor.

Schobel, a first-team alternate for the 2007 Pro Bowl, was called upon to relieve an injured Jason Taylor in the Pro Bowl. This was his second consecutive year in the Pro Bowl.

He started in 116 consecutive games with the Bills from 2003 until 2008, when he was on the inactive list for a game against the San Diego Chargers due to an injured foot. After a team-leading, 10-sack 2009 season, Schobel informed the Bills that he was considering retirement. To add on, new coach Gailey said that he was looking to switch from a 4–3 to 3–4 defense. It was reported by the Buffalo News on May 10, 2010, that Schobel & his wife June had sold their Orchard Park house, further adding to the speculation of his impending departure from the Bills. On July 27, 2010, Schobel announced he was 70/30 on returning to the Bills.

On August 4, 2010, the Bills released Schobel. He never signed with any other team; being released instead cemented his decision to retire, which he did on August 16.

== NFL career statistics ==
Legend
**Bold**	Career high

Year	Team	Games		Tackles					Interceptions					Fumbles			
Year	Team	GP	GS	Cmb	Solo	Ast	Sck	TFL	Int	Yds	TD	Lng	PD	FF	FR	Yds	TD
2001	BUF	16	11	42	31	11	6.5	7	0	0	0	0	2	0	0	0	0
2002	BUF	16	16	52	34	18	8.5	12	0	0	0	0	4	1	0	0	0
2003	BUF	16	16	60	37	23	11.5	15	**1**	6	0	6	3	1	1	0	0
2004	BUF	16	16	**73**	46	**27**	8.0	9	0	0	0	0	4	**5**	**3**	0	0
2005	BUF	16	16	71	**54**	17	12.0	14	**1**	0	0	0	**5**	2	1	0	0
2006	BUF	16	16	53	35	18	**14.0**	12	0	0	0	0	3	4	1	0	0
2007	BUF	16	16	57	45	12	6.5	7	0	0	0	0	**5**	**5**	1	0	0
2008	BUF	5	5	19	18	1	1.0	5	0	0	0	0	1	0	0	0	0
2009	BUF	16	16	56	34	22	10.0	**17**	**1**	**26**	**1**	**26**	4	3	1	0	0
Career		133	128	483	334	149	78.0	98	3	32	1	26	31	21	8	0	0

== Personal life ==
Aaron is the older brother of former NFL tight end Matt Schobel and cousin of former Jacksonville Jaguars defensive end Bo Schobel. Schobel and his wife, June have two sons, Brock and John, and one daughter, Erika.
