= Glidden, Texas =

- Unincorporated community Census-designated place
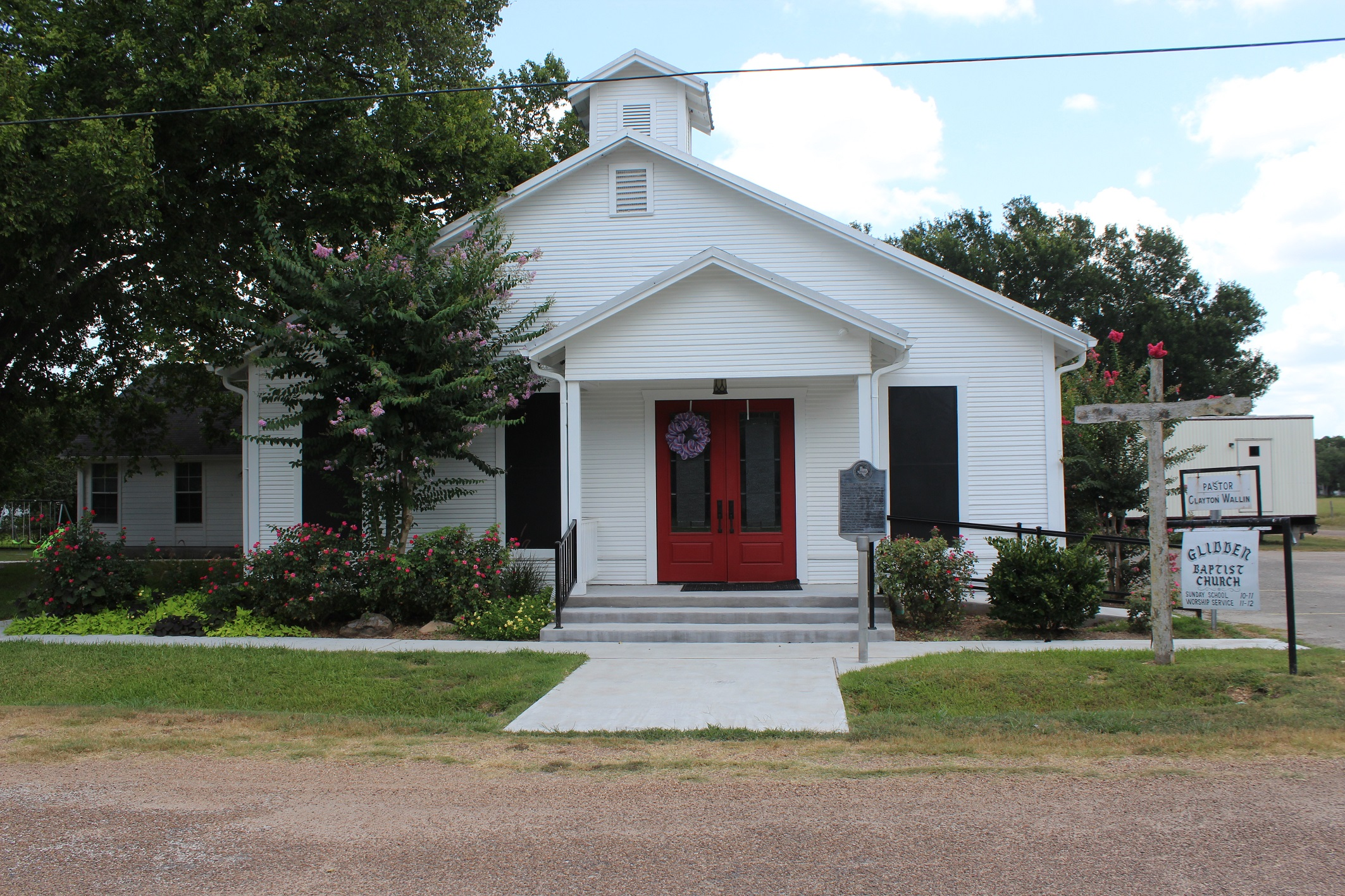
- Glidden Baptist Church in Glidden, Texas

- Location within Texas
- Coordinates: 29°42′03″N 96°35′11″W
- Country: United States
- State: Texas
- County: Colorado

Area
  - Total: 1.00 sq mi (2.60 km^{2})
  - Land: 1.00 sq mi (2.58 km^{2})
  - Water: 0.012 sq mi (0.03 km^{2})
- Elevation: 232 ft (71 m)

Population (2010)
  - Total: 661
  - Density: 665/sq mi (256.6/km^{2})
- Time zone: UTC-6 (Central (CST))
  - Summer (DST): UTC-5 (CDT)
- ZIP code: 78943
- Area code: 979
- FIPS code: 48-29912
- GNIS feature ID: 1336597

Glidden is an unincorporated community and census-designated place (CDP) in Colorado County, Texas, United States. As of the 2020 census, Glidden had a population of 741. It lies just north of Interstate 10 and 3 miles (5 km) to the west of Columbus.

== History ==
Located along the main line of the Southern Pacific Railroad, the town site was originally established by the Galveston, Harrisburg and San Antonio Railway in 1885. The post office was opened three years later, and the town served as a major railroad maintenance facility stop between Houston and El Paso. The community flourished during the Spanish–American War and the two world wars. Shortly after, the railroad movement from steam engines to those operating with diesel and electric rendered most of the railroad maintenance shops in Glidden obsolete. This caused the population to decrease to 150 residents by the late 1940s.

Between January 1911 and April 1912, a series of ax murders occurred in Texas and Louisiana, claiming 49 victims. Glidden was one of the numerous towns in which this type of homicide took place. It is believed that all victims died at the hands of an unidentified killer (or killers) during the reign of terror. In Glidden, a woman with her four children and a male guest were all murdered in their sleep in March 1912. There were several individuals suspected in the crimes in the different locations, but charges were dropped against all of them for lack of evidence. The murder cases remain unsolved.

== Geography ==
Glidden is located in north-central Colorado County and is bordered to the east by the city of Columbus, the county seat. U.S. Route 90 passes through the community, and Interstate 10 passes along the southern edge, with access from Exit 693. Weimar is 12 miles (19 km) to the west.

According to the U.S. Census Bureau, the Glidden CDP has a total area of 1.0 square mile (2.6 km^{2}), of which 0.01 square miles (0.03 km^{2}), or 1.10%, is water.

== Demographics ==
Historical population
Census	Pop.	Note	%±
2010	661		—
2020	741		12.1%
U.S. Decennial Census; 1850–1900 1910; 1920 1930 1940; 1950 1960 1970; 1980 1990 2000; 2010 2020

Gliddenfirst appeared as a census-designated place in the 2010 U.S. census.

=== 2020 census ===
Glidden CDP, Texas – Racial and ethnic composition Note: the US Census treats Hispanic/Latino as an ethnic category. This table excludes Latinos from the racial categories and assigns them to a separate category. Hispanics/Latinos may be of any race.
Race / Ethnicity (NH = Non-Hispanic)	Pop 2010	Pop 2020	% 2010	% 2020
White alone (NH)	271	282	41.00%	38.06%
Black or African American alone (NH)	123	73	18.61%	9.85%
Native American or Alaska Native alone (NH)	0	0	0.00%	0.00%
Asian alone (NH)	11	1	1.66%	0.13%
Native Hawaiian or Pacific Islander alone (NH)	0	0	0.00%	0.00%
Other race alone (NH)	0	0	0.00%	0.00%
Mixed race or Multiracial (NH)	3	17	0.45%	2.29%
Hispanic or Latino (any race)	253	368	38.28%	49.66%
Total	661	741	100.00%	100.00%

== Education ==
It is within the Columbus Independent School District. Columbus High School is the comprehensive high school of the district.

The Texas Legislature assigns areas in Columbus ISD to Wharton County Junior College.
