= Francis Harrington Glidden =

American businessman (1832–1922)

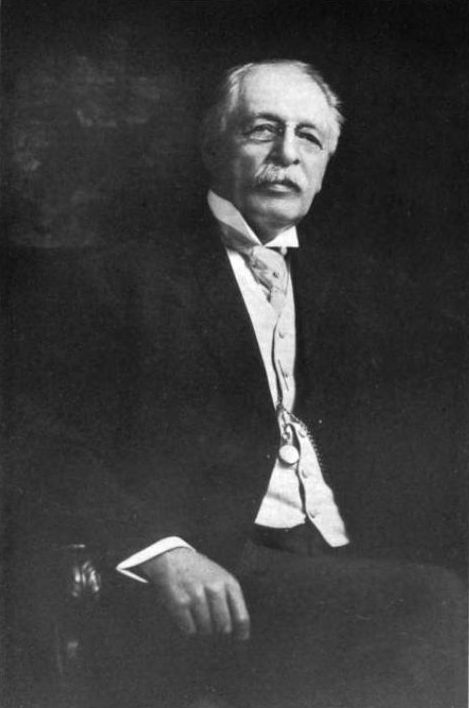
- Born: May 24, 1832; New Castle, Maine, US
- Died: September 25, 1922 (aged 90); Cleveland, Ohio, US
- Occupation: businessman
- Known for: founding the Glidden Company

Francis Harrington Glidden (1832–1922) was an American businessman best known for founding the company now known as the Glidden Company, which became a subsidiary of Akzo Nobel NV before that company sold the Glidden business to PPG Industries in 2012.

== Biography ==
Glidden was born on May 24, 1832, in New Castle, Maine, and attended Lincoln Academy. After marrying Winifred Kavanaugh Waters in 1854, he had a career as a seaman and dry-goods merchant. In 1866, he entered the varnish business for the first time, working as a varnish salesman for William Tilden and Nehphena, in New York City. He remained with that company through 1875.

In 1868, Glidden moved to Cleveland, Ohio. In 1875, after leaving Tilden, he started his own varnish manufacturing company, named The Glidden-Brackett Company; renamed later to the Glidden & Joy Company, and in 1890 incorporated as The Glidden Varnish Company.

Glidden served as President and Director of the company; retiring in 1917 at age 85. In addition to his work with the company, Glidden served as director of Central National Bank of Cleveland.

Glidden resided in the Clifton Park area of Lakewood, Ohio, in a home he built in 1910 that he named "Inglewood." He died September 25, 1922, in Cleveland, and is buried in Lakeview Cemetery.
