= Glidden (paints) =

Paint brand

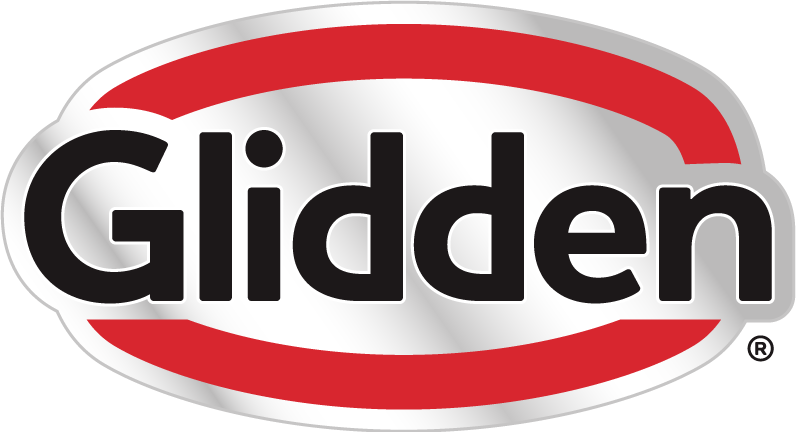
- Company type: Subsidiary
- Industry: Paint
- Founded: Cleveland, Ohio, U.S. (1875)
- Founder: Francis Harrington Glidden, Levi Brackett and Thomas Bolles
- Headquarters: Pittsburgh, Pennsylvania, U.S.
- Area served: North America
- Products: Paint, Home improvement products
- Revenue: $1.5 billion (2011)
- Parent: Pittsburgh Paints Company
- Website: glidden.com

Glidden is an American paint brand, manufactured by Pittsburgh Paints Company.

Glidden was purchased by British conglomerate ICI in 1986, which in turn was later acquired by Dutch conglomerate AkzoNobel in 2008. PPG Industries announced an agreement to acquire Glidden from AkzoNobel for $1.05 billion on December 14, 2012. The transaction closed April 1, 2013. Following the deal, PPG will be the second largest paint manufacturer in North America, behind Sherwin-Williams.

In October 2024, PPG Industries reached a deal to sell its architectural coatings U.S. and Canada business, which includes Glidden, to American Industrial Partners, the new entity is called Pittsburgh Paints Company.

== History ==
Glidden was started in Cleveland, Ohio, in 1875 by Francis Harrington Glidden, Levi Brackett and Thomas Bolles. It began making varnishes for furniture, pianos, carriages, and wagons. It expanded greatly, opening a 17-acre varnish factory in 1908 which was claimed to be the largest in the world.

It was initially named the Glidden, Brackett & Company and was renamed later to the Glidden & Joy Company, and in 1890 incorporated as The Glidden Varnish Company. Francis Glidden retired from the business at the age of 85, turning the company over to Adrian D. Joyce and his associates after a public sale. Joyce became president when Glidden was incorporated in 1917, a title he would retain until 1950, when his son, Dwight P. Joyce, succeeded him. Joyce rolled up ten paint and varnish competitors in his first two years at the helm.

During the Roaring Twenties, Joyce greatly expanded the company by integrating vertically through the acquisition of chemical and pigment companies, and creating The Glidden Food Products Co. in 1920.

Glidden famously employed the chemist Percy Julian in the 1930s, who was one of the first African-Americans to receive a Ph.D. in chemistry.

In 1967, Glidden merged with SCM Corporation and became the Glidden-Durkee Division of that company. In less than 10 years, the division became responsible for two thirds of SCM's sales. SCM was acquired by Hanson Trust, PLC, in 1986; Hanson sold the Glidden Division (retaining Durkee foods) to Imperial Chemical Industries. ICI was bought by the Dutch company AkzoNobel in 2008; Akzo Nobel's American decorative paints business was bought by Pittsburgh's PPG in 2013.

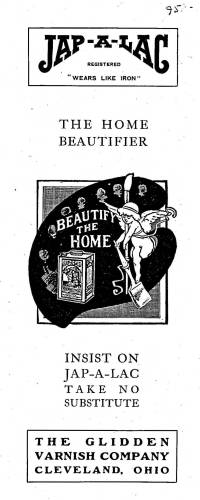
Advertisement pamphlet for Jap-A-Lac varnish from the Glidden Varnish Company (1890)
