= Henry Orange Glidden =

American architect and artist

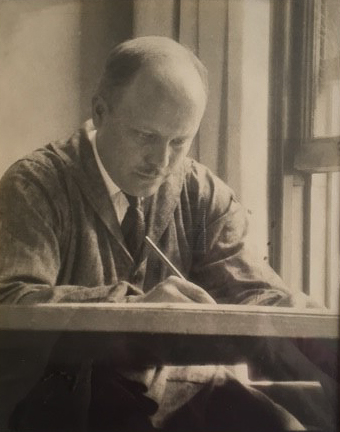
- Glidden at work around 1920
- Born: April 5, 1891; Somerville, MA
- Died: March 16, 1978 (aged 86); Abington, Massachusetts
- Resting place: Mount Vernon Cemetery Abington, Massachusetts
- Education: Massachusetts Institute of Technology (B.S., M.S.)
- Known for: Pastel and watercolor paintings
- Awards: Richard Mitton Gold Medal; 1963 Jordan Marsh Exhibition by New England Artists

Henry Orange Glidden was an architect, artist, and dedicated supporter of the arts who lived and worked in eastern Massachusetts during the first three quarters of the 20th century.

== Biography ==
Henry was born in Somerville, Massachusetts, on April 5, 1891, to Charles Henry Glidden and May Grace Orange. He was thus a member of the eighth generation of the Glidden family in the United States. He graduated from the Rindge Manual Training School in Cambridge, Massachusetts, in 1909. Thereafter, he attended the Massachusetts Institute of Technology (MIT) where he graduated at the head of his class in 1913 with a Bachelor of Science degree. In 1914 he was awarded a Master of Science degree, also from MIT.

Henry married his first wife, Dorothy Ayer, in Cambridge on June 15, 1916. They had two daughters, Dorothy (Jackson, MI), May 15, 1917 and Frances (Melrose, Massachusetts), December 17, 1921. Dorothy Ayer died at age 31 in Arlington on August 5, 1921. He was married twice more, first to Ethel L. and finally, in 1958, to Jane Doughty.

His first job out of MIT was with the Carr Fastener Company in Melrose Highlands. During the depression he worked on a WPA-sponsored project which required accurate copies of famous old buildings in New England. Some of his work done at that time is in the files of the Library of Congress in Washington, D.C. Later he worked as an architect for the Turner Construction Company. He was a member of the First Church of Christ, Scientist in Rockland, a member of the Appalachian Mountain Club, and a 50-year member of the Columbian Masonic Lodge, A.F. & A.M.

Henry died on March 16, 1978, and was interred in the Mount Vernon Cemetery in Abington, Massachusetts.

== Artwork ==
Most of all, however, Henry loved art. In 1913, while a senior at MIT, he agreed to draw the poster for the school's annual Tech Show, a vaudeville-style production of song and dance. See thumbnail left. In later life, he was one of the founders of the Abington Art Association, its president for three years, executive committee member, and secretary. He was also a member of the Brockton Art Center, now known as the Fuller Craft Museum, and for many years a member of the Boston Museum of Fine Arts.

Over his life, he exhibited in many art shows which included Abington, Norwell, Duxbury, Weymouth, Braintree, Scituate, Cohasset and Concord Art Associations, State Federation of Women's Clubs and Visual Art Club of Bridgewater State College. He had one-man shows at the Universalist-Unitarian Church in Brockton, Oyster Harbor Club, Osterville, North Quincy Public Library, Utica Mutual Insurance Company, IBM Building, Waltham, and Milton Hill House, Milton. In 1963 his watercolor "Rocky Coast" received the highest popular vote in this class at the annual Jordan Marsh Exhibition by New England artists, winning the Richard Mitton Gold Medal Award.

== Gallery ==
Although Henry did some work with oil and pastels, most of his extant paintings are water colors. His subjects were diverse, ranging from portraits to sea- and landscapes, and even the occasional still life. Here are some examples:

Fishermen at the dock

Boat on Boston Harbor

Boston Harbor at dusk

Another harbor view with lobster traps

A mullah or holy man

City street with many wires

Construction work on girders

A white cocker spaniel

A teapot still life

Sprawling tree along a beach

A rowboat pulled up on the shore

A quiet seashore

Three sailboats in the harbor

Cabanas at the beach

Boat on calm waters

White Horse Ledge in North Conway, New Hampshire

Japanese lady in kimono

Little girl in her Sunday finery

Lady with a yellow feather
