= Columbus, Texas =

- City
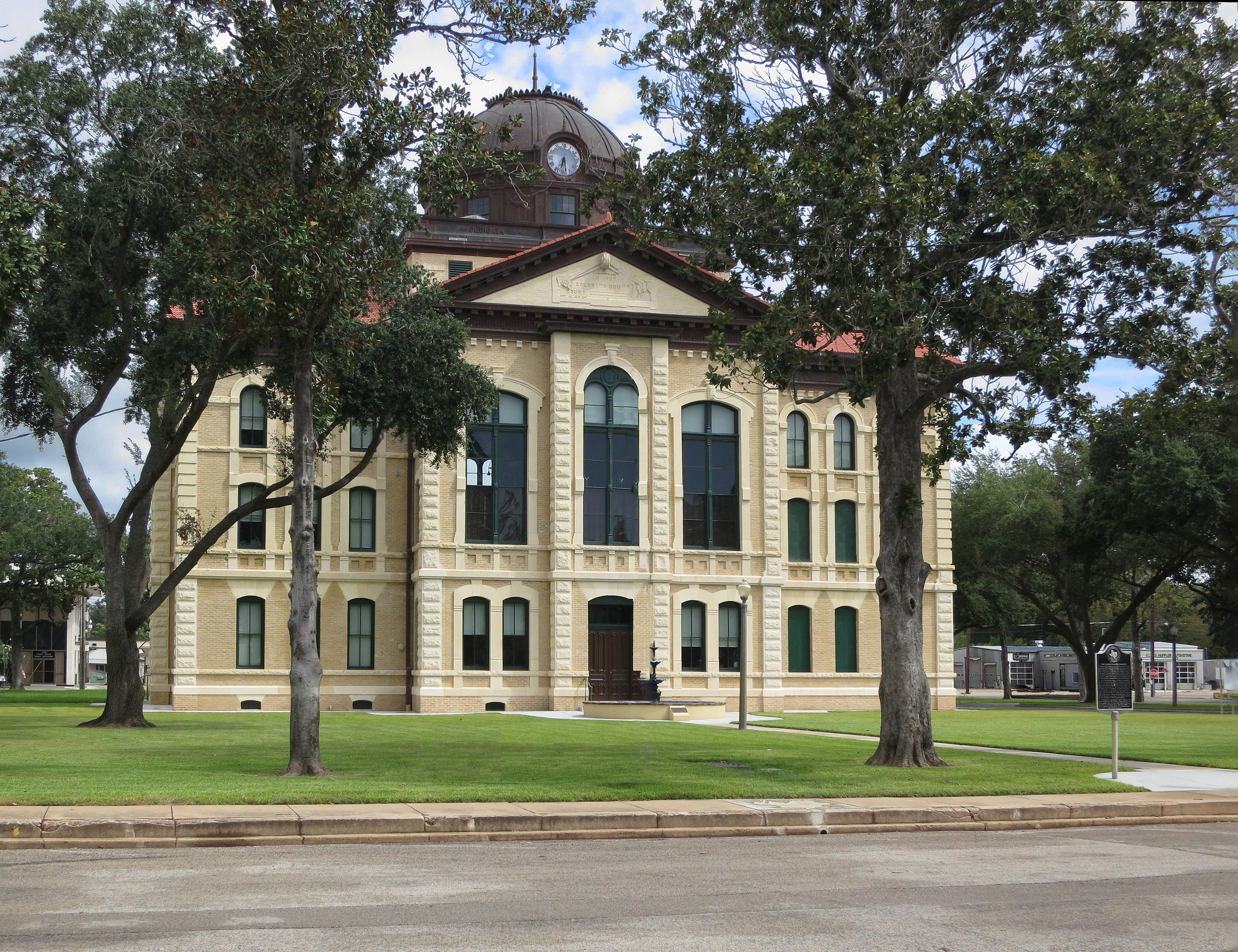
- The Colorado County Courthouse, built 1890–1891: this 2014 photo shows restoration to original color scheme made in 2013

- Location of Columbus, Texas
- Coordinates: 29°42′21″N 96°32′46″W
- Country: United States
- State: Texas
- County: Colorado

Government
  - Mayor: Lori An Gobert

Area
  - Total: 2.98 sq mi (7.72 km^{2})
  - Land: 2.98 sq mi (7.71 km^{2})
  - Water: 0.0039 sq mi (0.01 km^{2})
- Elevation: 203 ft (62 m)

Population (2020)
  - Total: 3,699
  - Density: 1,224.4/sq mi (472.75/km^{2})
- Time zone: UTC-6 (Central (CST))
  - Summer (DST): UTC-5 (CDT)
- ZIP code: 78934
- Area code: 979
- FIPS code: 48-16168
- GNIS feature ID: 1333156
- Website: www.columbustexas.net

Columbus is a city in and the county seat of Colorado County in southeastern Texas, United States. Its population was 3,699 as of the 2020 census. It is located on the Colorado River. The Colorado County Courthouse is listed on the National Register of Historic Places.

A Santa Claus museum is located in Columbus.

== History ==
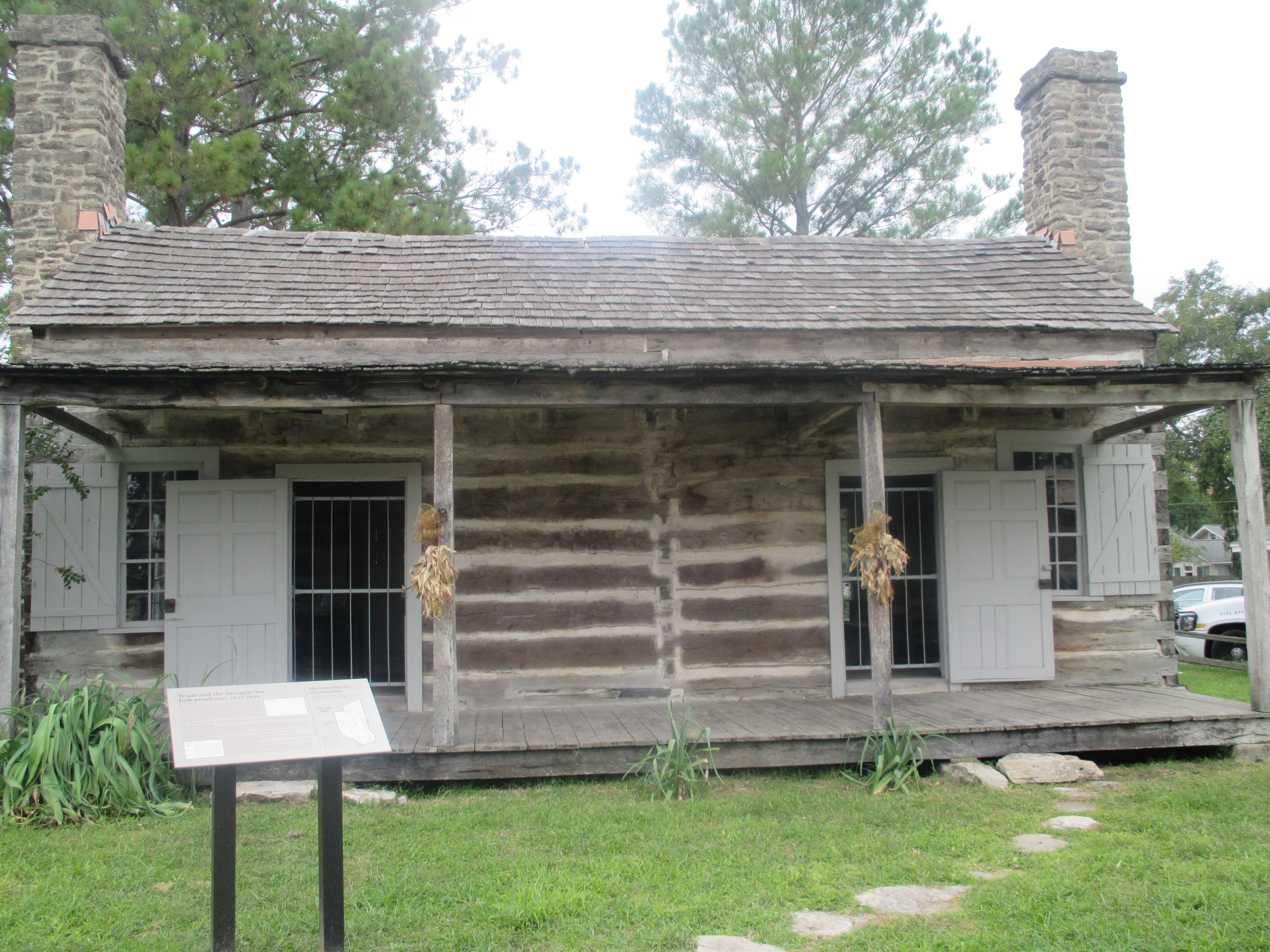
Abram Alley Log Cabin (1830s), now used also as Tool Museum in Columbus

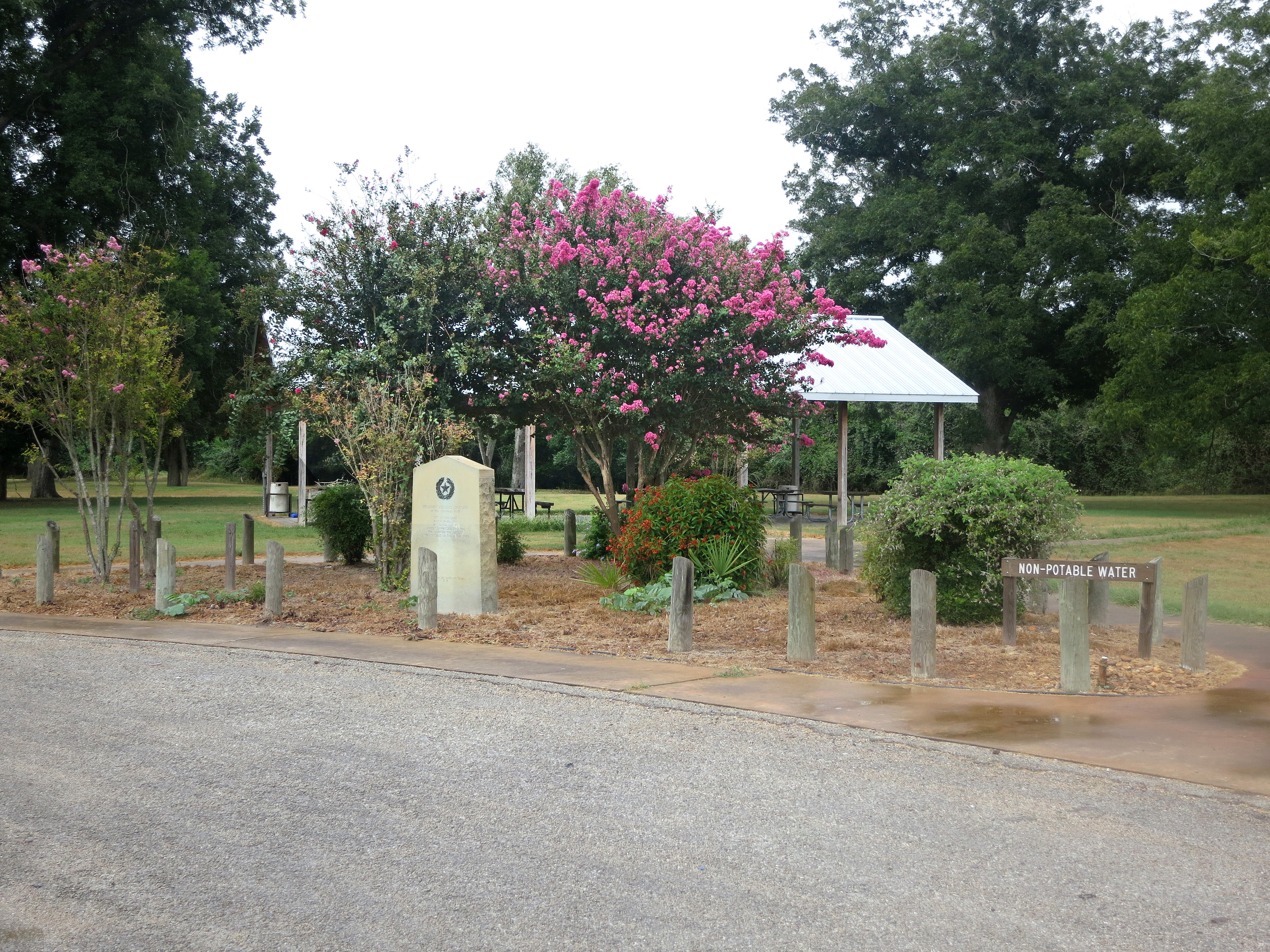
Park commemorating Benjamin Beason's ferry and where Sam Houston camped during his retreat to San Jacinto where he defeated the Mexican Army

The first American settlers arrived in 1821 on what is known as the legendary site of Montezuma's Indian village. In 1822, the Mexican government issued land grants to members of Stephen F. Austin's Old Three Hundred, who included Benjamin Beason (originally spelled "Beeson") and Abram Alley. Alley's 1830s log cabin has been preserved in Columbus and is used as a tool museum. Beason arrived in 1821, received his land grant in 1822, and settled along the Colorado River with his wife Elizabeth "Betsy" and family. By late December 1821, colonists Robert H. Kuykendall, with his brother Joseph and Daniel Gilleland, arrived in the area of present-day Columbus. In 1822, Benjamin Beason began operating a ferry across the Colorado River, and the settlement became known as Beason's Ferry or Beason's Crossing. Beason also established a gristmill, gin, and sawmill; his wife operated a boarding house.

Beason's Crossing became part of Austin's San Felipe colony in 1822, when the colony was divided into two districts by the Mexican governor José F. Trespalacios. The Mexican government granted the rights to establish a town, and the locals elected town officials. John J. Tumlinson Sr., was elected alcalde, with Robert Kuykendall captain and Moses Morrison lieutenant. Tumlinson's land adjoined Beason's; together, they made up much of the site of present-day Columbus. Tumlinson was killed by Native Americans in 1823. In 1834, after the Tumlinson children inherited the estate, they sold land to William Dewees, who was married to Beason's daughter, Lydia. Dewees' land grant was near the site of present-day Glidden, Texas.

By 1836, Beason's Ferry Crossing was home to over 25 families. During the fight for Texas independence, Sam Houston and his men camped along the banks of the Colorado River near Beason's Crossing. Following the Battle of the Alamo, Santa Anna's army headed for San Jacinto, and Houston ordered that Beason's Crossing be burned during the Runaway Scrape.

Columbus was established by European Americans in 1837 after Texas achieved independence from Mexico. After the population returned following warfare, residents renamed Beason's as Crossing "Columbus". Some speculate that it was named in honor of residents who migrated from Columbus, Ohio, while others believe the town was named after Christopher Columbus, who explored on behalf of Spain in the late 15th century.

The town of Columbus was platted again in 1837. The Dewees family gave land for a new school and possibly a courthouse. By 1837, the town had been re-established with two public houses, two stores, and half a dozen small dwellings.

It was later named the seat of Colorado County, and had developed as a center of business and trade for surrounding areas. Cattle ranching was big business by the late 19th century. Some merchants and ranchers did very well and built fine houses in the city, such as the house built by Robert E. Stafford. He supported the Stafford Opera House, now serving also as a museum, event, and performance space. In the late 19th and early 20th centuries, it attracted touring performers and lecturers. Other notable historic homes operated today as museums are the Dilue Rose Harris House Museum and Tate-Senftenburg-Brandon House Museum. The Tate-Senftenburg-Brandon House, formerly owned by the Columbus Historical Preservation Trust, Inc., was sold to private owners in 2017 and is no longer operated as a museum, but is being further restored and maintains its historic character.

The Colorado County Courthouse was built in 1890, the fourth such structure in the city. It was designed in the Classical Revival and Italianate styles of architecture by noted Houston architect Eugene T. Heiner. He designed at least nine other Texas courthouses. The bell tower was damaged in a 1909 storm. The dome was added before 1939. It is listed on the National Register of Historic Places. In 2013–2014, the courthouse was being renovated and upgraded for current uses; the project included restoration of historic exterior colors.

== Geography ==
Columbus is located along Interstate 10, on the southwest side of the Colorado River.

According to the United States Census Bureau, the city has a total area of 2.88 square miles (7.45 km^{2}), of which 0.004 square miles (0.01 km^{2}), or 0.16%, is covered by water.

=== Climate ===
The climate in this area is characterized by hot, humid summers and generally mild to cool winters. According to the Köppen climate classification, Columbus has a humid subtropical climate, Cfa on climate maps.

Climate data for Columbus, Texas (1991–2020 normals, extremes 1962–present)
Month	Jan	Feb	Mar	Apr	May	Jun	Jul	Aug	Sep	Oct	Nov	Dec	Year
Record high °F (°C)	87 (31)	97 (36)	97 (36)	99 (37)	102 (39)	106 (41)	108 (42)	111 (44)	116 (47)	108 (42)	93 (34)	88 (31)	116 (47)
Mean maximum °F (°C)	79.8 (26.6)	83.2 (28.4)	87.2 (30.7)	90.1 (32.3)	94.4 (34.7)	98.6 (37.0)	101.3 (38.5)	103.7 (39.8)	100.9 (38.3)	94.8 (34.9)	87.5 (30.8)	82.4 (28.0)	105.0 (40.6)
Mean daily maximum °F (°C)	64.1 (17.8)	68.2 (20.1)	74.8 (23.8)	80.8 (27.1)	87.5 (30.8)	93.1 (33.9)	96.0 (35.6)	97.9 (36.6)	93.0 (33.9)	85.2 (29.6)	73.8 (23.2)	66.3 (19.1)	81.7 (27.6)
Daily mean °F (°C)	51.3 (10.7)	55.6 (13.1)	62.1 (16.7)	68.2 (20.1)	75.8 (24.3)	81.4 (27.4)	83.5 (28.6)	84.2 (29.0)	79.3 (26.3)	70.6 (21.4)	60.5 (15.8)	53.4 (11.9)	68.8 (20.4)
Mean daily minimum °F (°C)	38.6 (3.7)	43.0 (6.1)	49.3 (9.6)	55.7 (13.2)	64.2 (17.9)	69.8 (21.0)	71.0 (21.7)	70.6 (21.4)	65.6 (18.7)	56.0 (13.3)	47.2 (8.4)	40.5 (4.7)	56.0 (13.3)
Mean minimum °F (°C)	23.0 (−5.0)	27.2 (−2.7)	31.3 (−0.4)	38.5 (3.6)	49.9 (9.9)	62.9 (17.2)	66.4 (19.1)	64.8 (18.2)	52.9 (11.6)	39.0 (3.9)	29.5 (−1.4)	24.5 (−4.2)	20.6 (−6.3)
Record low °F (°C)	10 (−12)	13 (−11)	12 (−11)	28 (−2)	40 (4)	49 (9)	56 (13)	46 (8)	40 (4)	25 (−4)	18 (−8)	4 (−16)	4 (−16)
Average precipitation inches (mm)	3.67 (93)	2.81 (71)	3.32 (84)	3.77 (96)	4.78 (121)	5.11 (130)	2.93 (74)	3.30 (84)	3.26 (83)	4.69 (119)	4.02 (102)	3.38 (86)	45.04 (1,144)
Average snowfall inches (cm)	0.0 (0.0)	0.0 (0.0)	0.0 (0.0)	0.0 (0.0)	0.0 (0.0)	0.0 (0.0)	0.0 (0.0)	0.0 (0.0)	0.0 (0.0)	0.0 (0.0)	0.0 (0.0)	0.0 (0.0)	0.0 (0.0)
Average precipitation days (≥ 0.01 in)	8.5	8.9	8.0	7.0	7.6	8.0	6.3	6.2	7.5	7.1	7.5	8.3	90.9
Average snowy days (≥ 0.1 in)	0.0	0.0	0.0	0.0	0.0	0.0	0.0	0.0	0.0	0.0	0.0	0.0	0.0
Source: NOAA

== Demographics ==
Historical population
Census	Pop.	Note	%±
1880	1,959		—
1890	2,199		12.3%
1900	1,824		−17.1%
1910	1,655		−9.3%
1920	1,433		−13.4%
1930	2,054		43.3%
1940	2,422		17.9%
1950	2,878		18.8%
1960	3,656		27.0%
1970	3,342		−8.6%
1980	3,923		17.4%
1990	3,367		−14.2%
2000	3,916		16.3%
2010	3,655		−6.7%
2020	3,699		1.2%
U.S. Decennial Census

In 1890, 2,199 people lived in Columbus. In 1900, the population declined to 1,824 residents.

=== 2020 census ===
As of the 2020 census, Columbus had a population of 3,699. The median age was 41.6 years; 21.7% of residents were under 18 and 24.3% were 65 or older. For every 100 females, there were 97.9 males, and for every 100 females 18 and over, there were 93.6 males 18 and over. None of the residents lived in urban areas, while 100.0% lived in rural areas.

Of the 1,446 households in Columbus, 30.8% had children under 18 living in them, 42.1% were married-couple households, 20.5% were households with a male householder and no spouse or partner present, and 32.2% were households with a female householder and no spouse or partner present. About 32.5% of all households were made up of individuals, and 17.3% had someone living alone who was 65 or older.

Of the 1,650 housing units, 12.4% were vacant. Among occupied housing units, 61.5% were owner-occupied and 38.5% were renter-occupied. The homeowner vacancy rate was 2.1% and the rental vacancy rate was 7.3%.

Racial composition as of the 2020 census
Race	Number	Percent
White	2,138	57.8%
Black or African American	643	17.4%
American Indian and Alaska Native	17	0.5%
Asian	40	1.1%
Native Hawaiian and other Pacific Islander	0	0%
Some other race	427	11.5%
Two or more races	434	11.7%
Hispanic or Latino (of any race)	1,066	28.8%

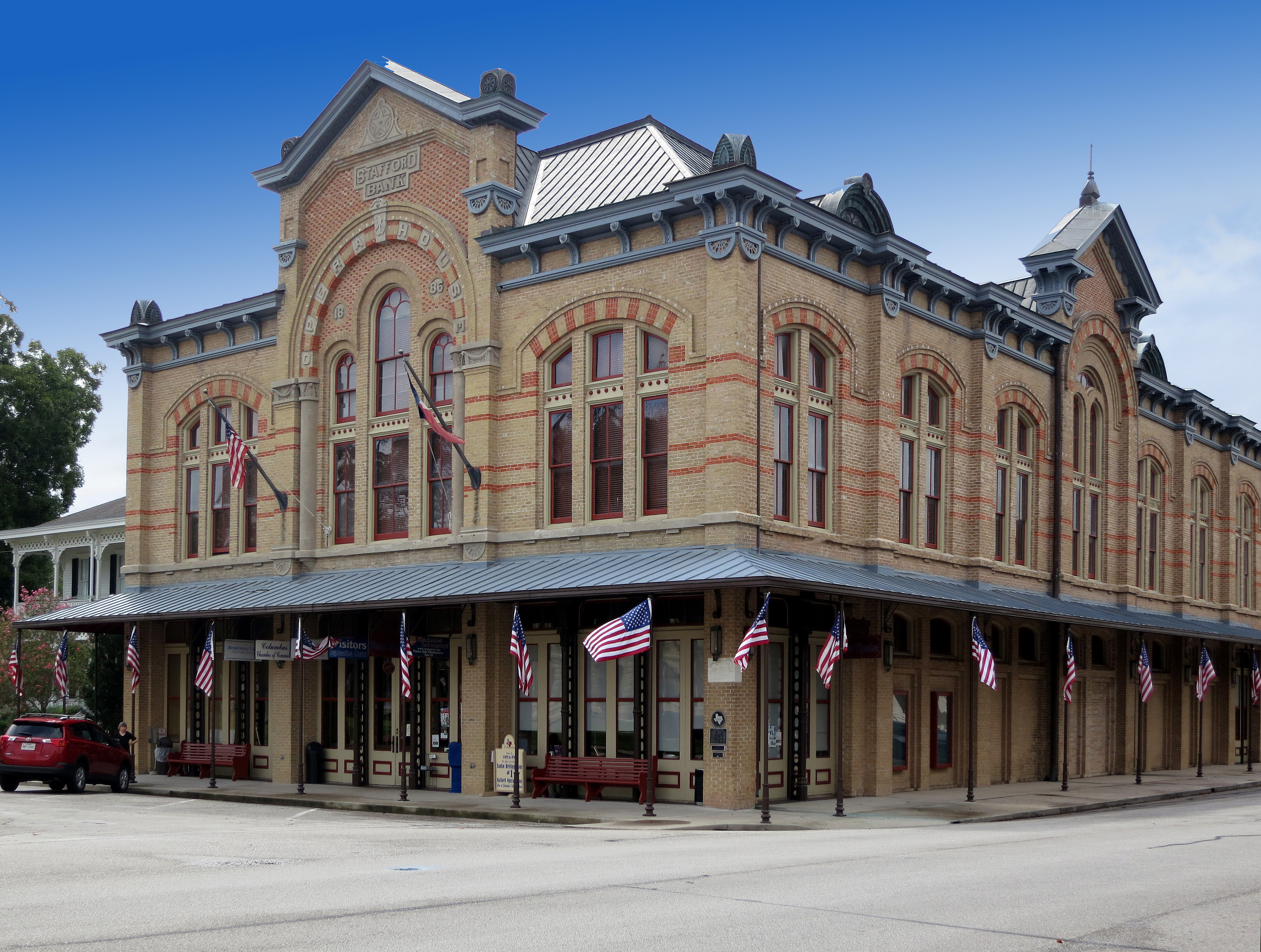
Old Stafford Opera House – Columbus, Texas

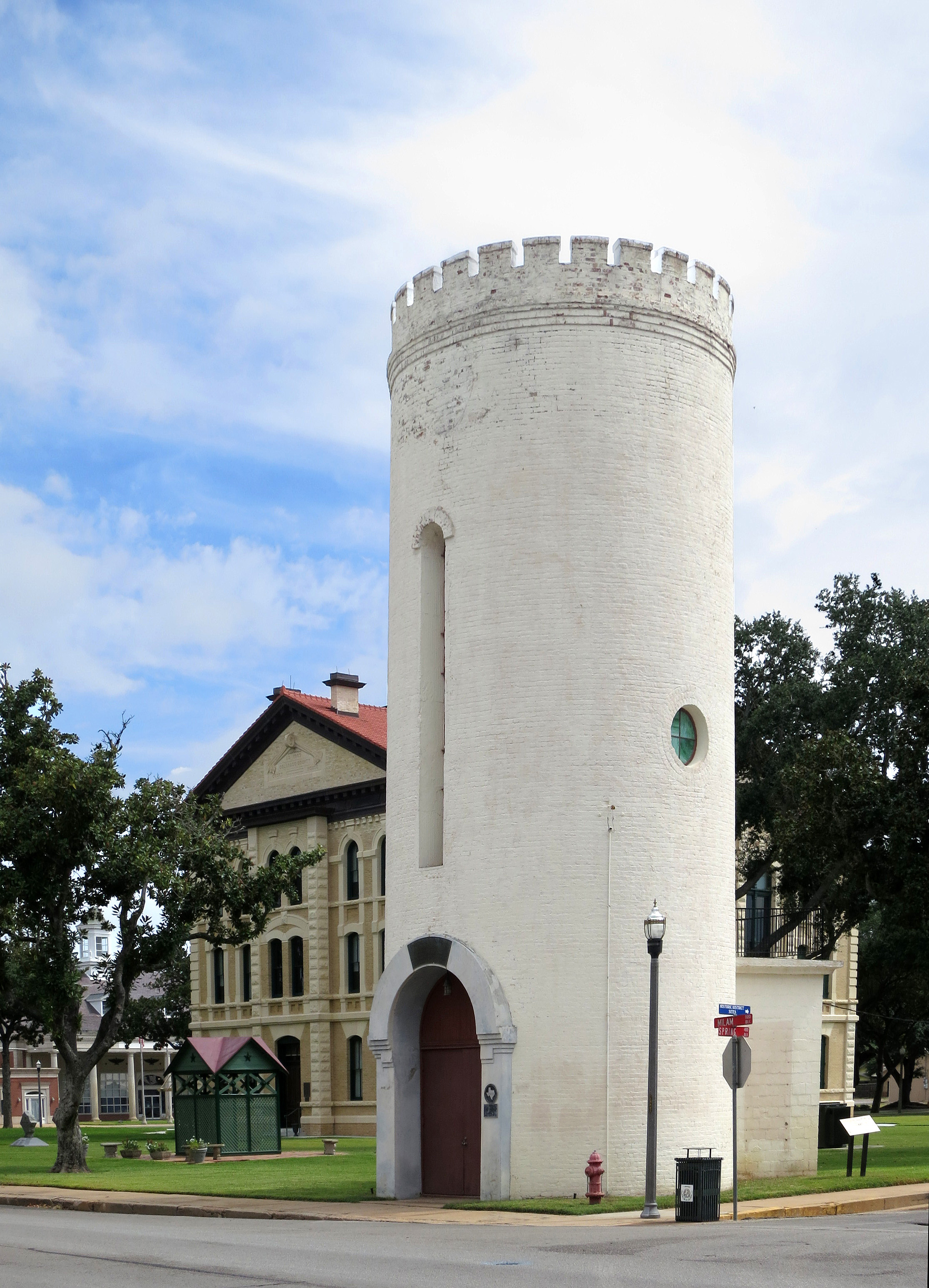
War Memorial Museum – Colorado County, Texas

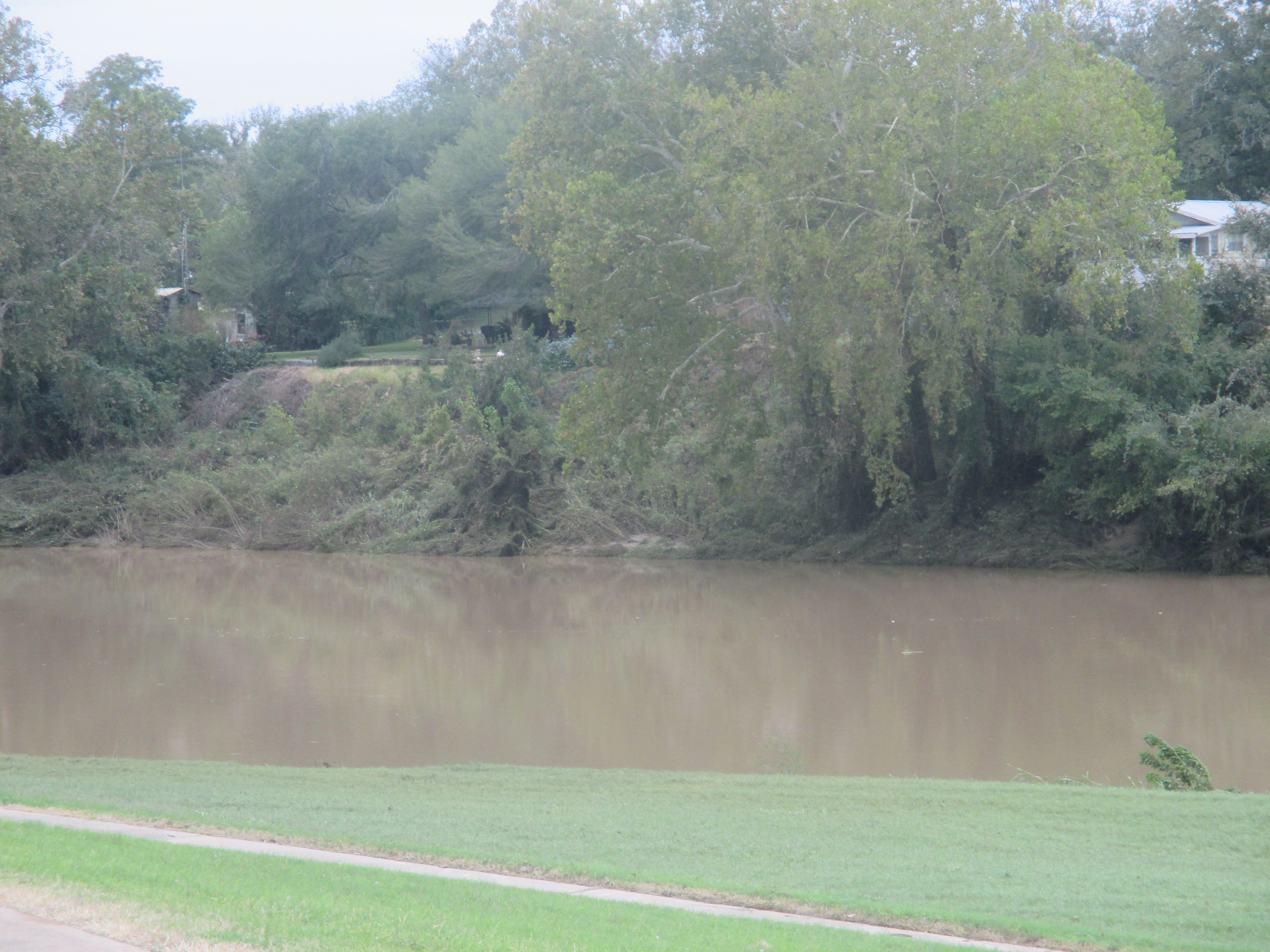
Colorado River in Beason's Park in Columbus

=== 2000 census ===
At the 2000 census, 3,916 people, 1,497 households and 946 families resided in the city. The population density was 1,387.5 inhabitants per square mile (535.7/km^{2}). The 1,750 housing units averaged 620.1 per square mile (239.4/km^{2}). The racial makeup of the city was 66.55% White, 19.94% African American, 0.36% Native American, 0.33% Asian, 0.03% Pacific Islander, 10.52% from other races, and 2.27% from two or more races. Hispanics or Latinos of any race were 17.62% of the population.

Of the 1,497 households, 28.4% had children under 18 living with them, 45.8% were married couples living together, 14.0% had a female householder with no husband present, and 36.8% were not families. About 33.0% of all households were made up of individuals, and 19.6% had someone living alone who was 65 or older. The average household size was 2.40 and the average family size was 3.04.

The population was distributed as 23.4% were under 18, 8.2% from 18 to 24, 24.2% from 25 to 44, 19.6% from 45 to 64, and 24.5% who were 65 or older. The median age was 40 years. For every 100 females, there were 88.2 males. For every 100 females 18 and over, there were 84.2 males.

The median income for a household was $29,175 and for a family was $40,197. Males had a median income of $30,104 compared with $19,077 for females. The per capita income for the city was $15,822. About 15.5% of families and 20.5% of the population were below the poverty line, including 32.7% of those under 18 and 16.1% of those 65 or over.

== Arts and culture ==
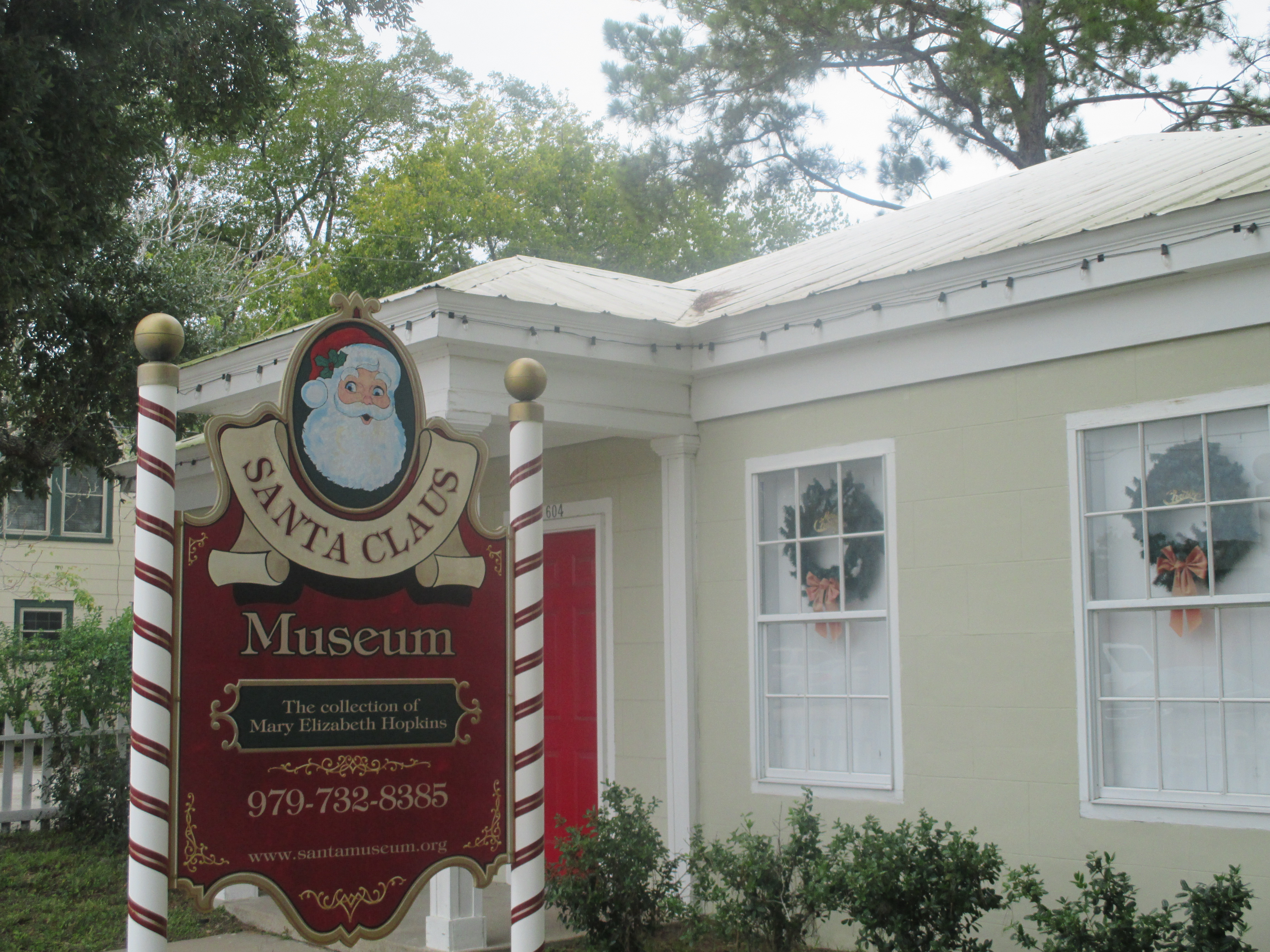
The Santa Claus Museum in Columbus

In the late 20th century, the Santa Claus Museum was established in town, based on the collection of Mary Elizabeth Hopkins (d. 1990) and located in her former residence. It has become a noted tourist destination in the region. The historic Alley Log Cabin and Tool Museum is another unique site, dating to the 1830s.

== Education ==
The city is served by the Columbus Independent School District, which includes:

- Columbus High School (grades 9–12)
- Columbus Junior High (grades 6–8)
- Columbus Elementary (prekindergarten - grade 5)

The Columbus Cardinal mascot was named by James Harbert Wooten, Jr., MD.

Also in Columbus are Saint Anthony Catholic School, a Catholic school of the Roman Catholic Diocese of Victoria in Texas serving students in prekindergarten through grade eight, and the Texas Bible Institute, a branch of Burchfield Ministries International.

The designated community college for Columbus ISD is Wharton County Junior College.

== Infrastructure ==
=== Highways ===
- I-10
- US 90
- SH 71

== Notable people ==
- Donna Campbell, former resident; member of the Texas Senate and an emergency room physician in New Braunfels
- Tanya McQueen, interior designer for the TV reality show, Extreme Makeover: Home Edition
- Dane Myers, Major League Baseball (MLB) player for the Cincinnati Reds
- Doug Rau, former MLB pitcher for the Los Angeles Dodgers and California Angels
- Aaron Schobel, National Football League (NFL) defensive end with the Buffalo Bills
- Bo Schobel, defensive end with the Arizona Cardinals
- Matt Schobel, tight end with the Cincinnati Bengals and Philadelphia Eagles
- Hal Smith, former MLB catcher and third baseman during 1955–1964
- James Truchard, co-founder of National Instruments
- LaAdrian Waddle, NFL player for the New England Patriots

== See also ==
- List of museums in East Texas
- National Register of Historic Places listings in Colorado County, Texas
