= David Glidden =

American politician

Chair of the Vermont Democratic Party
- In office February 18, 2023 – February 22, 2025
- Preceded by: Anne Lezak
- Succeeded by: Jim Ramsey (acting)

Personal details
- Born: July 23, 1994 (age 32)
- Party: Democratic
- Education: Wells College (BA)

David Glidden (born 1994/1995) is an American politician serving as the chair of the Vermont Democratic Party.

== Career ==
Glidden was first involved in the Democratic party as an intern in 2015. He was a field organizer in Franklin and Grand Isle Counties in 2016. In 2017 he was elected Assistant Treasurer of the party, and in 2021 was elected to Vice Chair of the party. He also ran in the 2020 Vermont House of Representatives election to represent the Franklin 3-1 District, but lost to Casey Toof and Mike McCarthy. He was also the communications director in Christine Hallquist's 2018 Gubernatorial campaign.

== Personal life ==
Glidden is LGBT.

Party political offices
| Preceded by Anne Lezak | Chair of the Vermont Democratic Party; 2023–2025 | Succeeded by Jim Ramsey; Acting |
