= Columbus High School (Texas) =

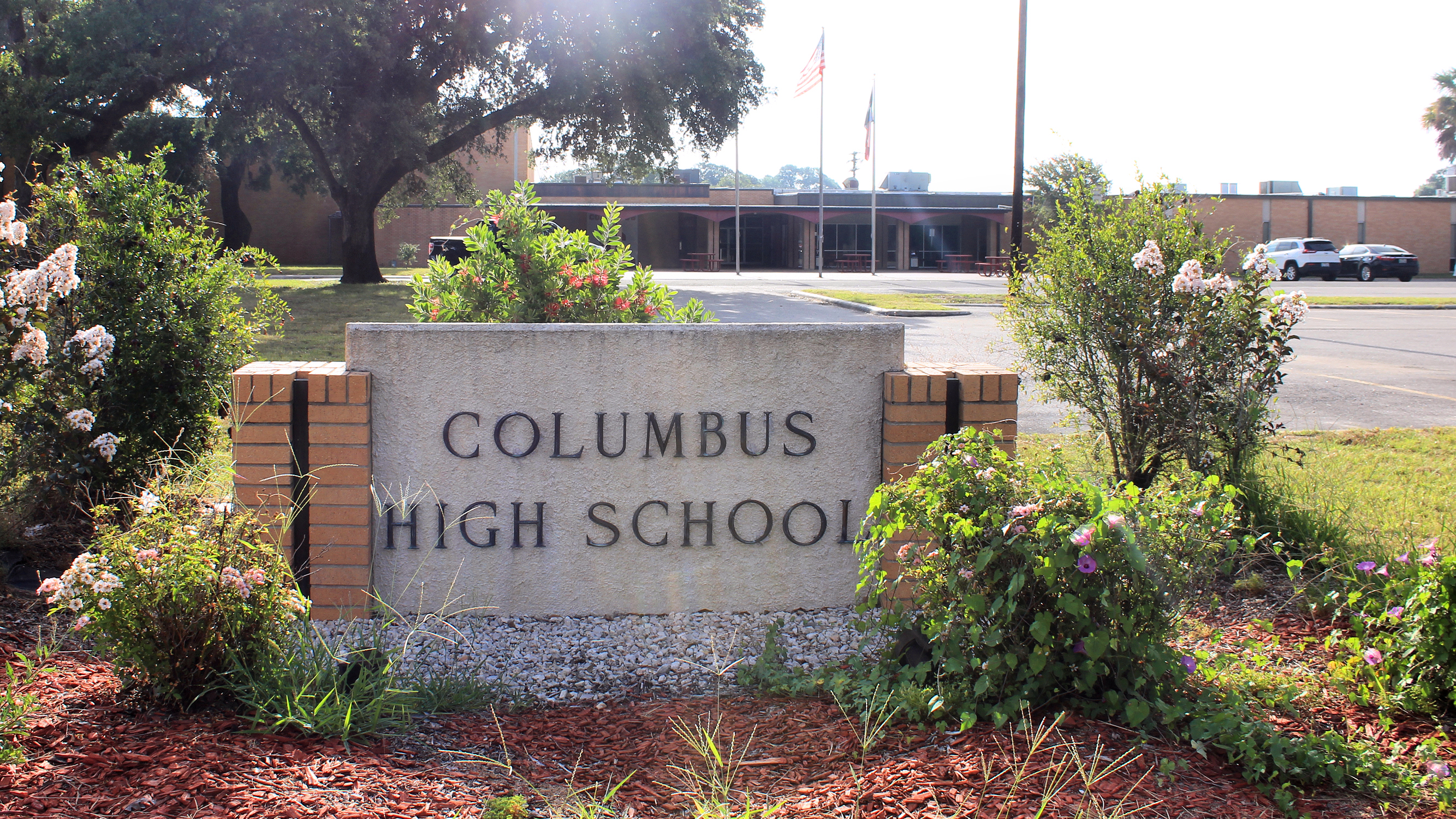

Location
- 103 Cardinal Lane; Columbus, Texas 78934; United States; 29.7019°N 96.5621°W

Information
- School type: Public high school
- Established: 1894
- School district: Columbus Independent School District
- Principal: Diana Sarao
- Teaching staff: 38.88 (FTE)
- Grades: 9-12
- Enrollment: 520 (2023–2024)
- Student to teacher ratio: 13.37
- Colors: Red & White
- Athletics conference: UIL Class 3A
- Mascot: Cardinal
- Yearbook: The Cardinal
- Website: chs.columbusisd.org

Columbus High School is a public high school located in Columbus, Texas (USA) and classified as a 3A school by the UIL. It is part of the Columbus Independent School District located in central Colorado County. In 2015, the school was rated "Met Standard" by the Texas Education Agency.

Columbus ISD includes the northern portion of Colorado County, including the city of Columbus and the communities of Glidden, Frelsburg, and most of Rock Island, as well as a small portion of western Austin County that includes the community of New Ulm.

== Athletics ==
The Columbus High School colors are red and white and Cardinals are the mascot. The school competes in the following sports:

- Baseball
- Basketball
- Cross country
- Football
- Golf
- Powerlifting
- Softball
- Swimming and diving
- Tennis
- Track and field
- Volleyball
- Soccer

=== State titles ===
- Boys Golf: 1961 (2A), 2019(3A)
- Girls Golf: 1976 (2A), 1977 (2A), 1978 (2A), 1979 (2A), 1981 (3A), 1983 (3A), 1985 (3A)
- Boys Track: 1976 (2A), 1986 (3A)
- Girls Track: 1991 (3A)
- Football: 2024 (3A/D1)
