= Columbus Independent School District =

School district in Texas, United States

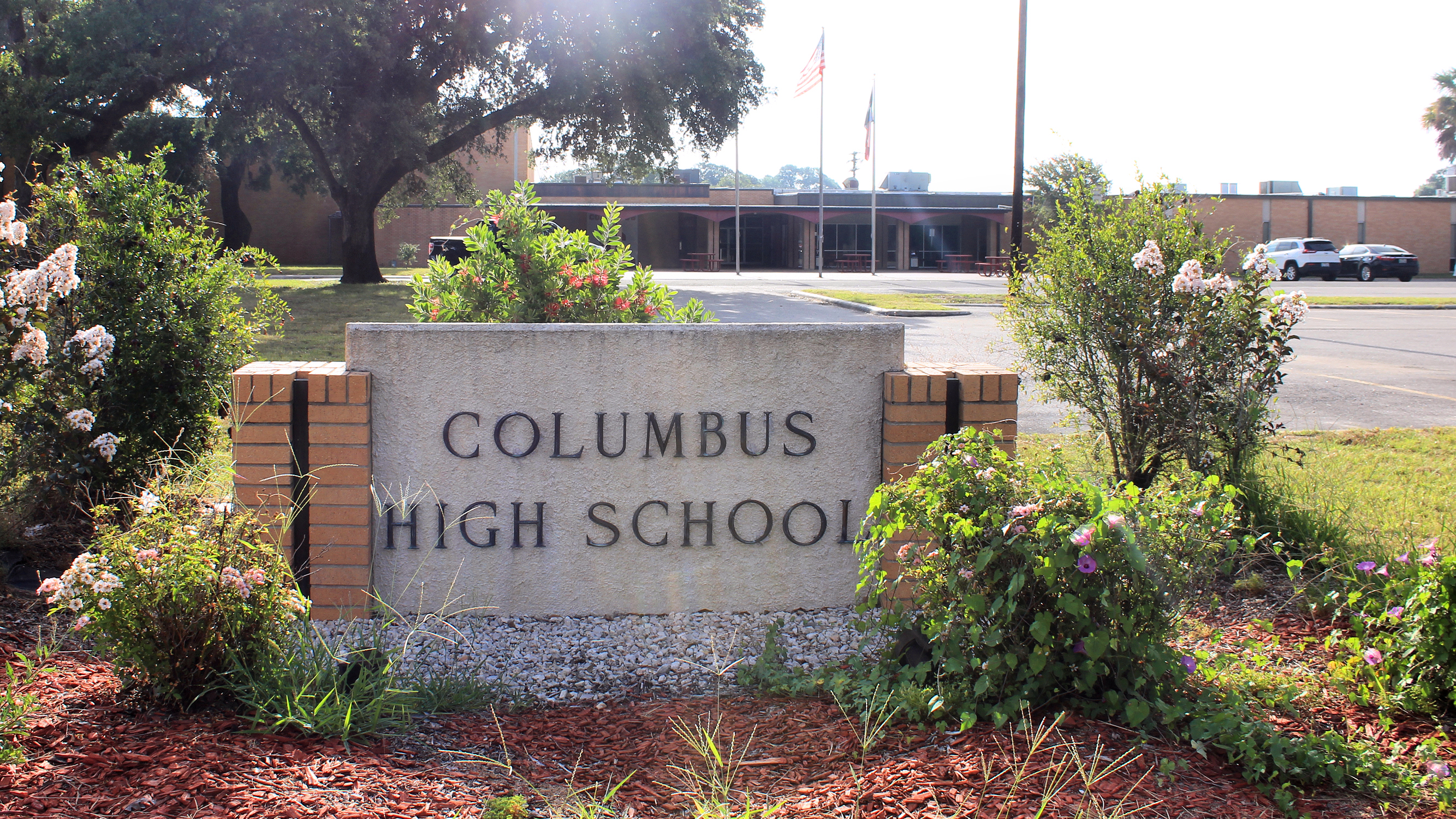
- Columbus High School

Address
- 105 Cardinal Lane Columbus, Texas, 78934; United States

District information
- Grades: PK–12
- Schools: 4
- NCES District ID: 4814700

Students and staff
- Students: 1,636 (2023–2024)
- Teachers: 123.30 (on an FTE basis)
- Student–teacher ratio: 13.27:1

Other information
- Website: www.columbusisd.org

Columbus Independent School District is a public school district based in Columbus, Texas (USA).

Columbus ISD serves the northern portion of Colorado County, including the city of Columbus and the communities of Glidden, Frelsburg, and most of Rock Island, as well as a small portion of western Austin County that includes the community of New Ulm.

In 2009, the school district was rated "academically acceptable" by the Texas Education Agency.

== Schools ==
- Columbus High School (Grades 9-12)
- Columbus Junior High School (Grades 6-8)
- Columbus Elementary School (Grades PK-5)

Columbus High School is at 103 Cardinal Lane.
