= Altair, Texas =

- Unincorporated community
- Location within the state of Texas Altair (the United States)
- Coordinates: 29°34′17″N 96°27′15″W
- Country: United States
- State: Texas
- County: Colorado
- Elevation: 204 ft (62 m)
- Time zone: UTC-6 (Central (CST))
  - Summer (DST): UTC-5 (CDT)
- ZIP code: 77412
- Area code: 979

Altair is an unincorporated community in Colorado County, Texas, United States. It is located at the four-way stop sign junction of U.S. Route 90 Alternate and State Highway 71. The community had an estimated population of 30 in 2000.

== History ==
The settlement was established in the late 1880s. In 1888, a post office was opened there. Originally named Stafford's Ranch, the town honored a prominent local rancher. Residents of Stafford, Texas approved the name Altair for the star in 1890 because there was another town that already had a post office by that name. In the same year, Altair secured service from a Texas and New Orleans Railroad branch. Sometimes people refer to Stafford's Ranch incorrectly as Spafford's Ranch. In the 1960s, 200 people were living in Altair. Eighty was the estimated population between 1974 and 1986. The community helped a few shops and rice-drying establishments in 1986. Thirty was the population in 1990 and 2000.

Altair has a post office with the ZIP code 77412.

The Garwood spur of the Union Pacific Railroad is a Colorado River crossing in Altair (see List of crossings of the Colorado River (Texas).

== Geography ==
Altair is located along U.S. Highway 90A and Texas State Highway 71 in south central Colorado County, about 9 mi (14 km) south of Columbus, 28 mi (45 km) north of El Campo, and 30 mi (48 km) east of Hallettsville.

== Education ==
Public education in the community of Altair is provided by the Rice Consolidated Independent School District. The district, which serves southern Colorado County, is headquartered in Altair and home to the Rice High School Raiders.

The designated community college for Rice CISD is Wharton County Junior College.

== Notable people ==
- Ryan Trahan, YouTube star.

== Gallery ==
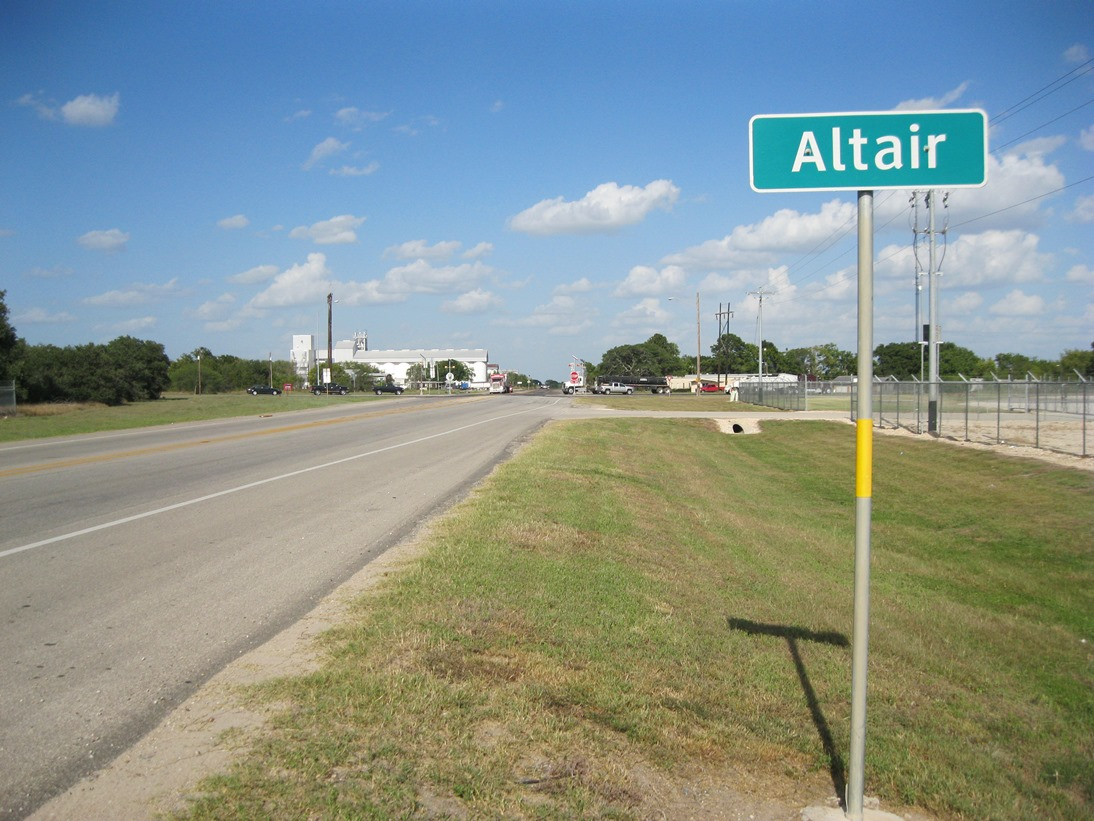
Beyond the Altair sign on US 90A is the Highway 71 junction and the rice dryer, Kallina Dryer Inc. The view is east.

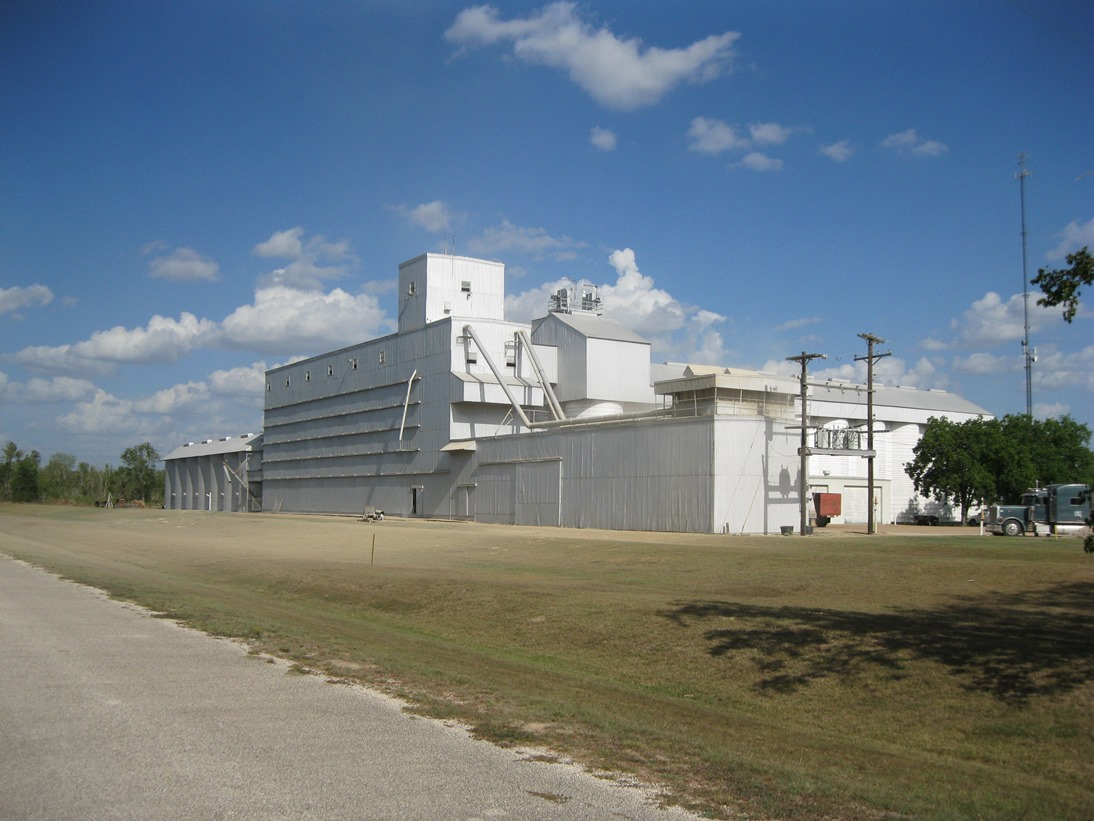
The rice dryer, Kallina Dryer Inc., is a prominent landmark in Altair.

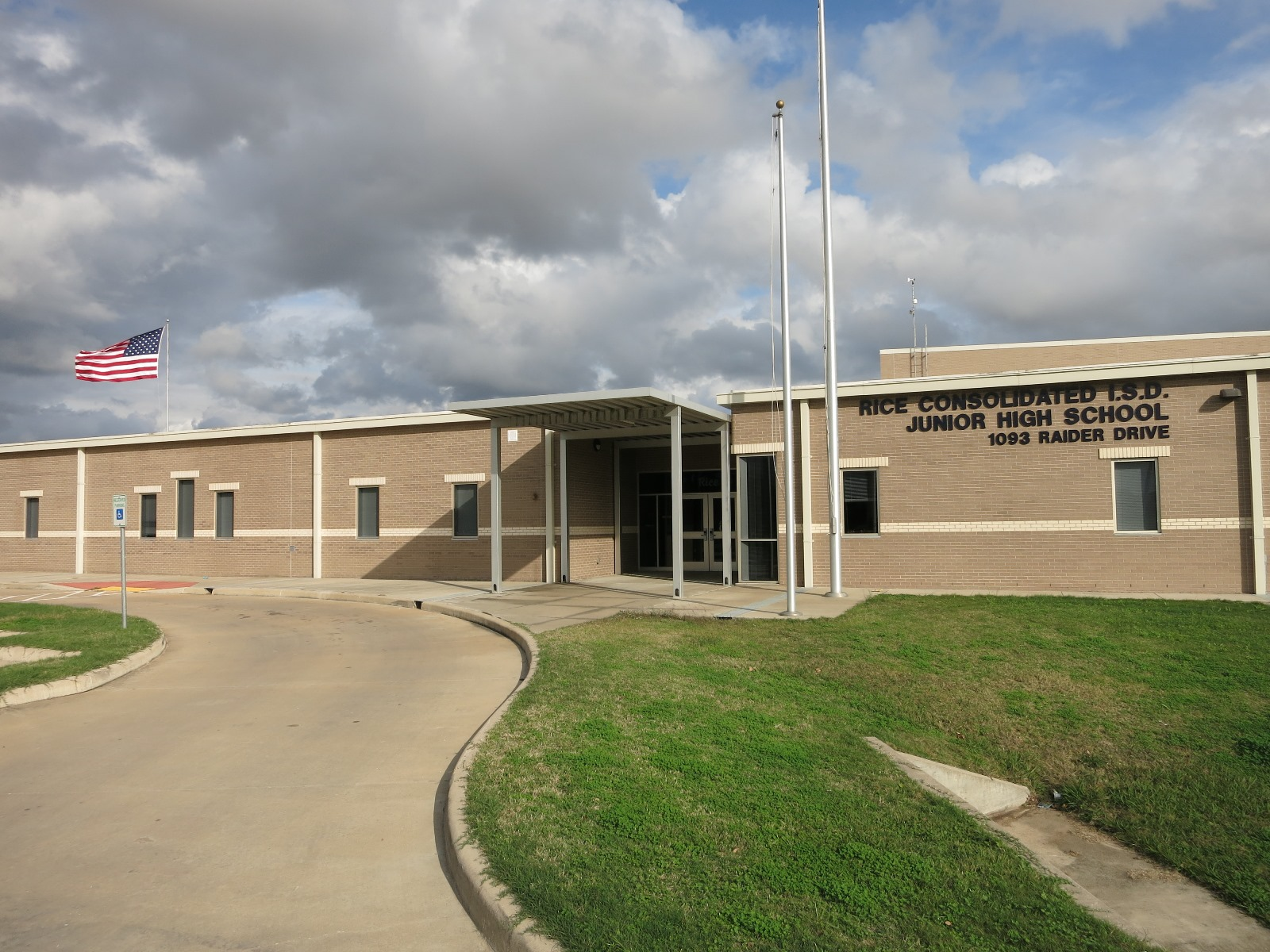
Rice CISD Junior High School is located on US 90A between Altair and Rock Island.
