= Rice High School (Altair, Texas) =

Location
- 1095 Raider Drive; Altair, Texas 77412; United States; 29.5593°N 96.5074°W

Information
- School type: Public high school
- Established: 1970
- School district: Rice Consolidated Independent School District
- Principal: Erron Mahone
- Teaching staff: 30.32 (FTE)
- Grades: 9-12
- Enrollment: 356 (2023–2024)
- Student to teacher ratio: 11.74
- Colors: Royal Blue & Silver
- Athletics conference: UIL Class 3A
- Mascot: Raider
- Yearbook: Raider
- Website: https://ricehs.ricecisd.org/

Rice High School or Altair Rice is a public high school located near the community of Altair, Texas (USA) and classified as a 3A school by the UIL. It is a part of the Rice Consolidated Independent School District located in southeastern Colorado County.

In addition to Altair, the district serves the city of Eagle Lake, the communities of Garwood, Nada, and Sheridan, and portions of Rock Island, as well as rural areas in southern Colorado County.

== History ==
The school is the result of the consolidation of high schools in Eagle Lake, Garwood and Sheridan.

In 2015, the school was rated "Met Standard" by the Texas Education Agency.

== Athletics ==
The Rice Raiders compete in the following sports:

- Baseball
- Basketball
- Cross Country
- American football
- Golf
- Powerlifting
- Softball
- Tennis
- Track & Field
- Volleyball

=== State Titles ===
- Boys Basketball •
  - 1981(3A)
- Girls Track •
  - 1984(3A)

== Notable alumni ==
- Ryan Trahan - YouTuber
