= Bernard Ferdinand Popp =

- Titular Bishop of Capsus
- Church: Roman Catholic Church
- See: Titular See of Capsus
- In office: 1983–2014
- Predecessor: Laurent Yapi
- Successor: Daniel E. Garcia

Orders
- Ordination: February 24, 1943
- Consecration: July 25, 1983

Personal details
- Born: December 6, 1917 Nada, Texas, U.S.
- Died: June 27, 2014 (aged 96) San Antonio, Texas, U.S.

Bernard Ferdinand Popp (December 6, 1917 – June 27, 2014) was an American bishop of the Roman Catholic Church.

Popp was born in Nada, Texas in 1917. He was ordained a priest on February 24, 1943, in San Antonio, Texas. Popp was appointed Auxiliary bishop of the Archdiocese of San Antonio Texas along with Titular Bishop of Capsus on June 3, 1983, and consecrated July 25, 1983. Popp retired as Auxiliary bishop of San Antonio March 23, 1993. He died on June 27, 2014, aged 96.
