= Sheridan, Texas =

- Unincorporated community Census-designated place
- Location within the state of Texas Sheridan (the United States)
- Coordinates: 29°17′37″N 96°24′6″W
- Country: United States
- State: Texas
- County: Colorado

Area
  - Total: 5.57 sq mi (14.42 km^{2})
  - Land: 5.35 sq mi (13.85 km^{2})
  - Water: 0.22 sq mi (0.57 km^{2})
- Time zone: UTC-6 (Central (CST))
  - Summer (DST): UTC-5 (CDT)

Sheridan is an unincorporated community and census-designated place in Colorado County, Texas, United States. As of the 2020 census, Sheridan had a population of 520.

== History ==
Sheridan is on U.S. Highway 90-A and the Middle and West Forks of Sandy Creek, near the southwestern boundary of Colorado County. Although it was developed as a farming community, it now derives most of its income from cattle ranching and the Sheridan oil and gas field. The town dates from 1908, when Hugh Sheridan, from whom the town got its name, sold extensive acreage to the San Antonio Loan and Securities Company. The company, in turn, entered into an agreement with the San Antonio and Aransas Pass Railway to develop the town and promote the sale of lots and small farms. In September 1908, a post office was established with Mrs. Lea A. Scott as postmistress. The plat of the town was recorded in the Colorado County clerk's office in 1909, and on March 6 of that year, a hotel was completed to accommodate prospective buyers. Sheridan was widely advertised in the Midwest, and the town grew and prospered. The foremost crop at the time was figs, and the Sheridan Fig Preserving Company shipped crates by rail throughout the United States. Other popular crops included cucumbers, melons, potatoes, and strawberries. The post office moved briefly to nearby Cheetham in 1912, but was returned in a few months to Sheridan, which by 1914 had 150 residents and several businesses. After several false starts, the Shell Oil Company brought in a gas-producing discovery well in 1940 in what became the Sheridan oil and gas field. The use of the land for farming declined steeply. Termination of rail service following World War II coincided with the improvement of U.S. Highway 90-A, and the town suffered little in consequence. In 1986, Sheridan had a population of 225 served by 17 businesses, and was noted for its cattle production, its oil and gas field, and the excellent deer hunting in the surrounding area. Through 2000, the population was still recorded at 225.

== Demographics ==
Historical population
| Census | Pop. | Note | %± |
|---|---|---|---|
| 2020 | 520 | | — |
U.S. Decennial Census; 1850–1900 1910; 1920 1930 1940; 1950 1960 1970; 1980 1990 2000; 2010 2020

Sheridan first appeared as a census-designated place in the 2020 U.S. census.

=== 2020 census ===
Sheridan CDP, Texas – Racial and ethnic composition Note: the US Census treats Hispanic/Latino as an ethnic category. This table excludes Latinos from the racial categories and assigns them to a separate category. Hispanics/Latinos may be of any race.
| Race / Ethnicity (NH = Non-Hispanic) | Pop 2020 | % 2020 |
|---|---|---|
| White alone (NH) | 342 | 65.77% |
| Black or African American alone (NH) | 7 | 1.35% |
| Native American or Alaska Native alone (NH) | 1 | 0.19% |
| Asian alone (NH) | 3 | 0.58% |
| Native Hawaiian or Pacific Islander alone (NH) | 0 | 0.00% |
| Other race alone (NH) | 1 | 0.19% |
| Mixed race or multiracial (NH) | 25 | 4.81% |
| Hispanic or Latino (any race) | 141 | 27.12% |
| Total | 520 | 100.00% |

== Education ==
Sheridan is served by the Rice Consolidated Independent School District. Rice High School is the comprehensive high school of the district.

The designated community college for Rice CISD is Wharton County Junior College.

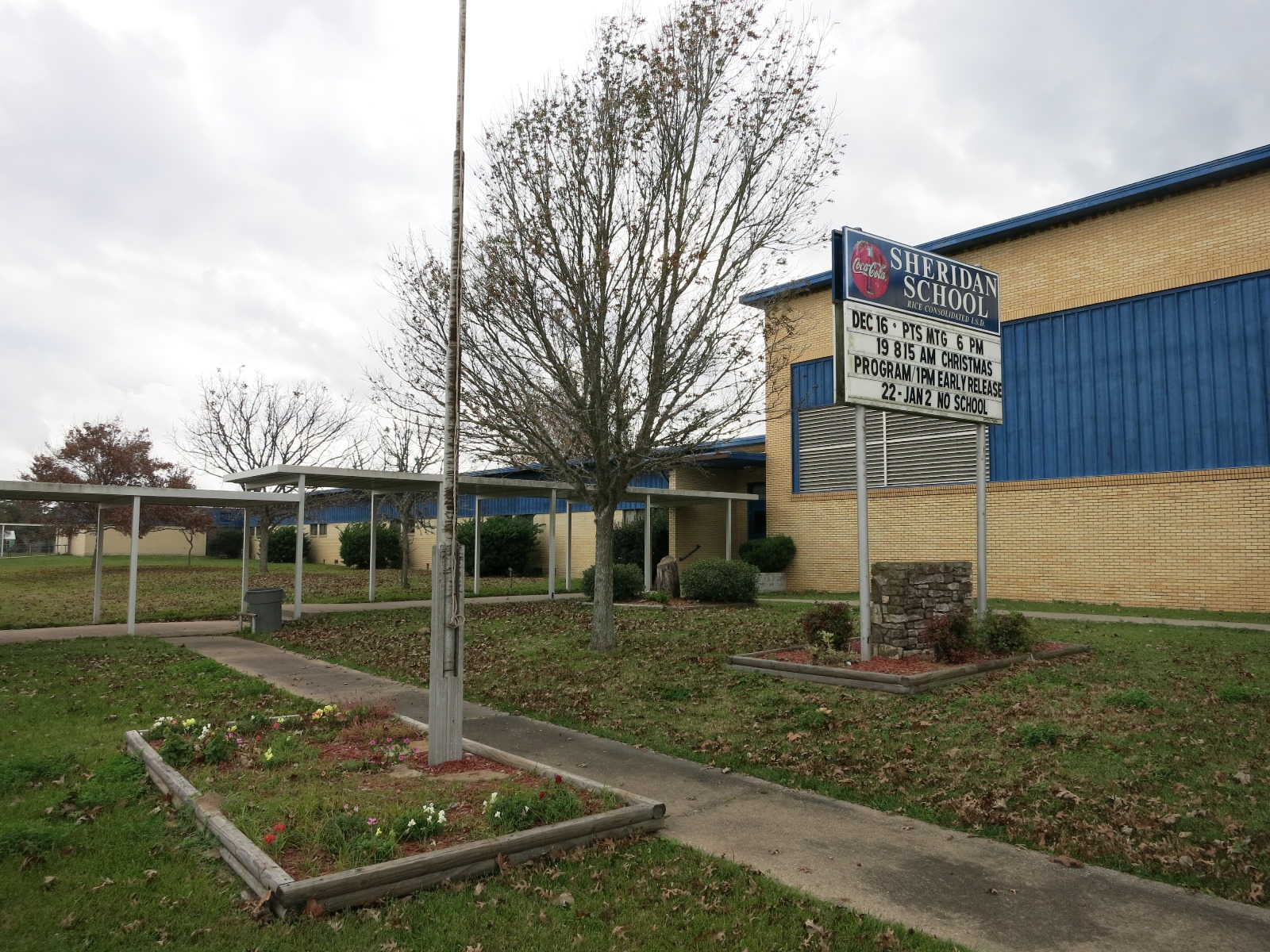
The Sheridan Elementary School is on FM 2437.

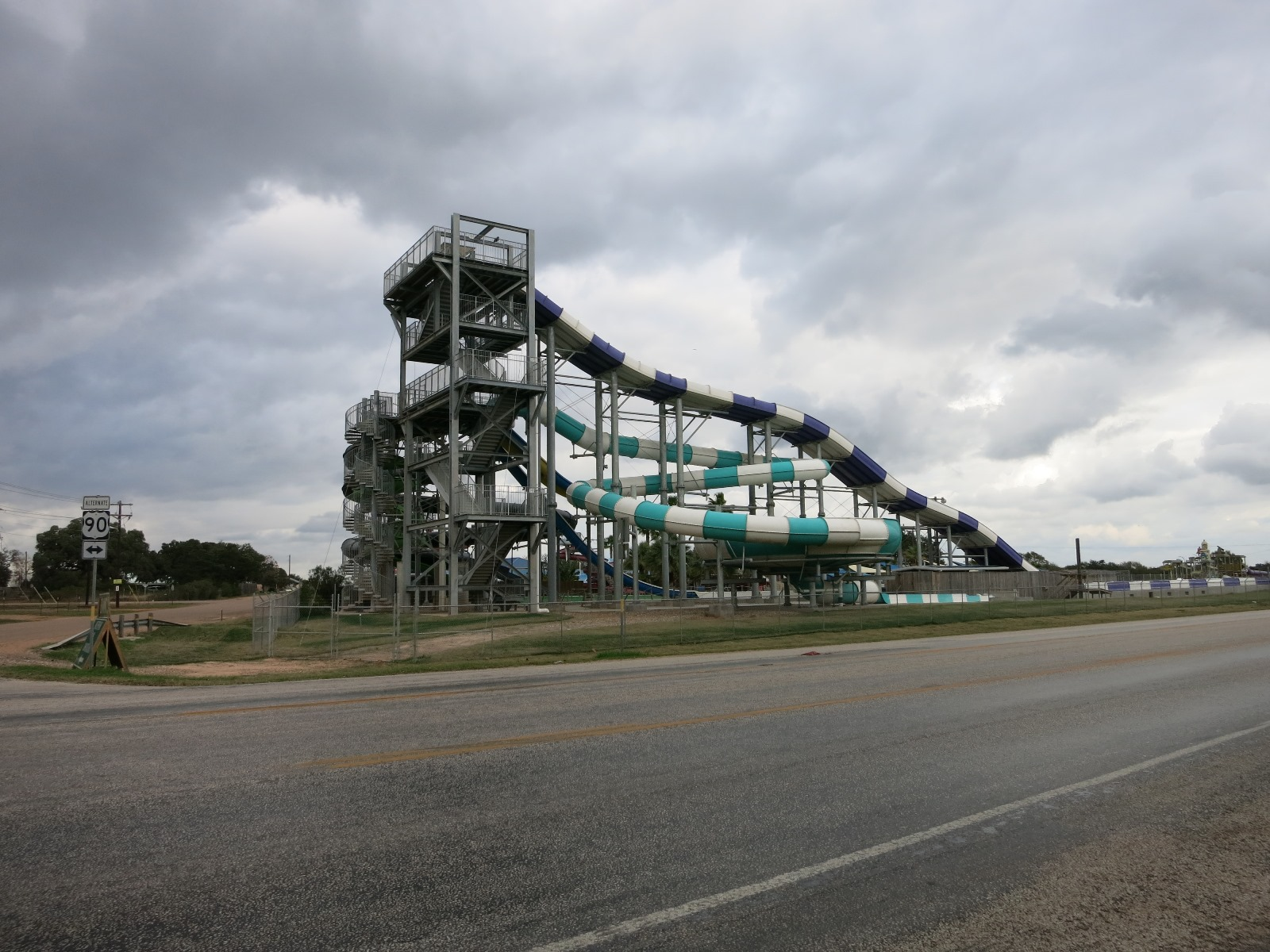
The Splashway Waterpark is on US 90A in Sheridan.

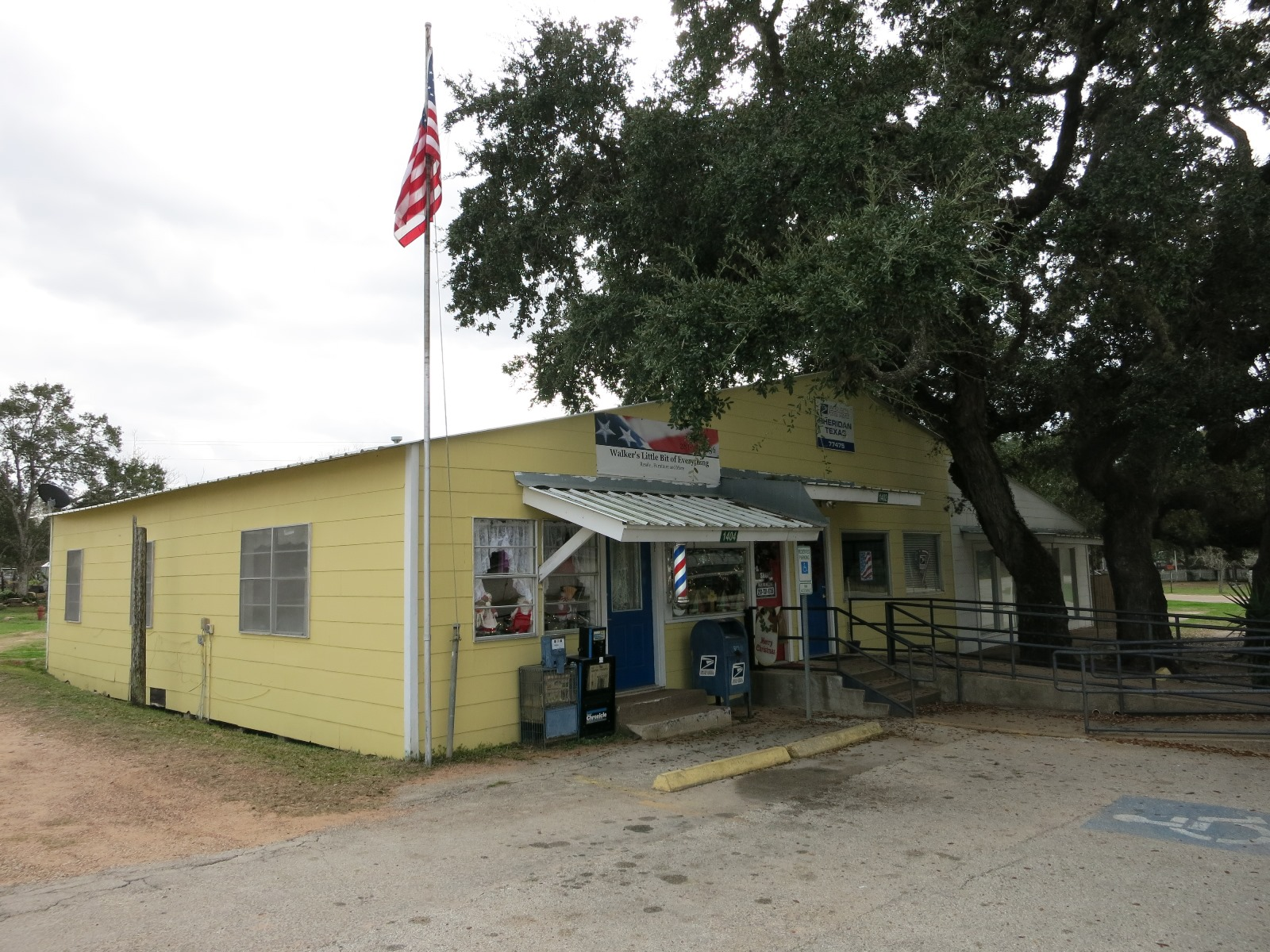
The US Post Office shares a building with a business.
