= Rice Consolidated Independent School District =

School district in Texas, United States

Address
- 1094 Raider Drive Altair, Texas, 77412; United States

District information
- Grades: PK–12
- Schools: 7
- NCES District ID: 4836970

Students and staff
- Students: 1,315 (2023–2024)
- Teachers: 97.07 (on an FTE basis)
- Student–teacher ratio: 13.55:1

Other information
- Website: www.ricecisd.org

Rice Consolidated Independent School District is a public school district based in the community of Altair, Texas (USA).

In addition to Altair, the district serves the city of Eagle Lake, the communities of Garwood, Nada, and Sheridan, and portions of Rock Island, as well as rural areas in southern Colorado County.

The merger of the districts was done by a 467-19 vote in Eagle Lake and a 204-68 vote in Garwood.

In 2009, the school district was rated "academically acceptable" by the Texas Education Agency.

== Schools ==
- Rice High School (grades 9–12, opened for 1970–1971 school year)
- Rice Junior High School (grades 6–8)
- Eagle Lake Intermediate School (grades 3–6)
- Eagle Lake Primary School (grades PK-2)
- Garwood School (grades K-6)
- Sheridan School (grades K-6)
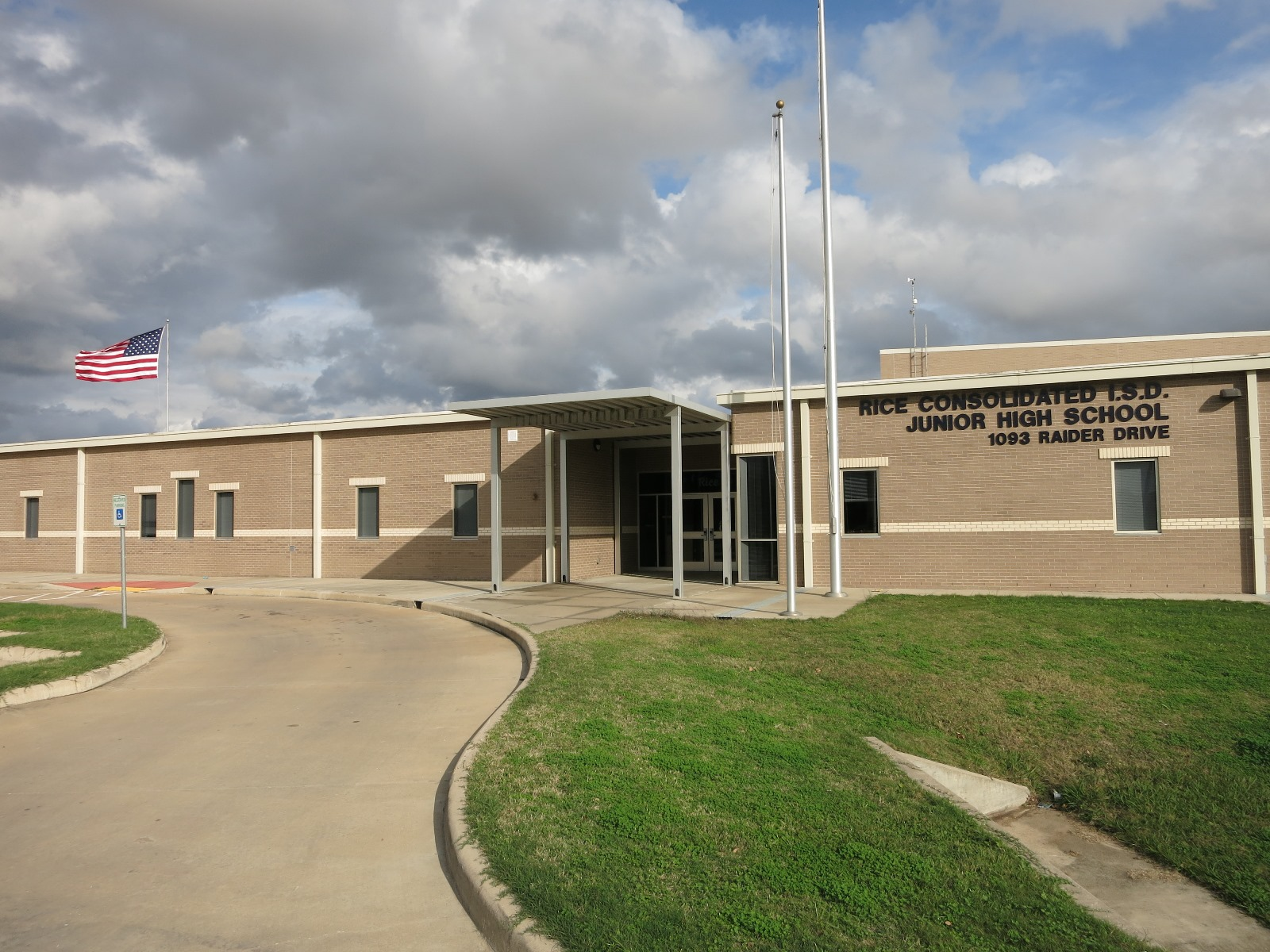
Rice Junior High School is on the same campus as the high school on US 90A between Altair and Rock Island.

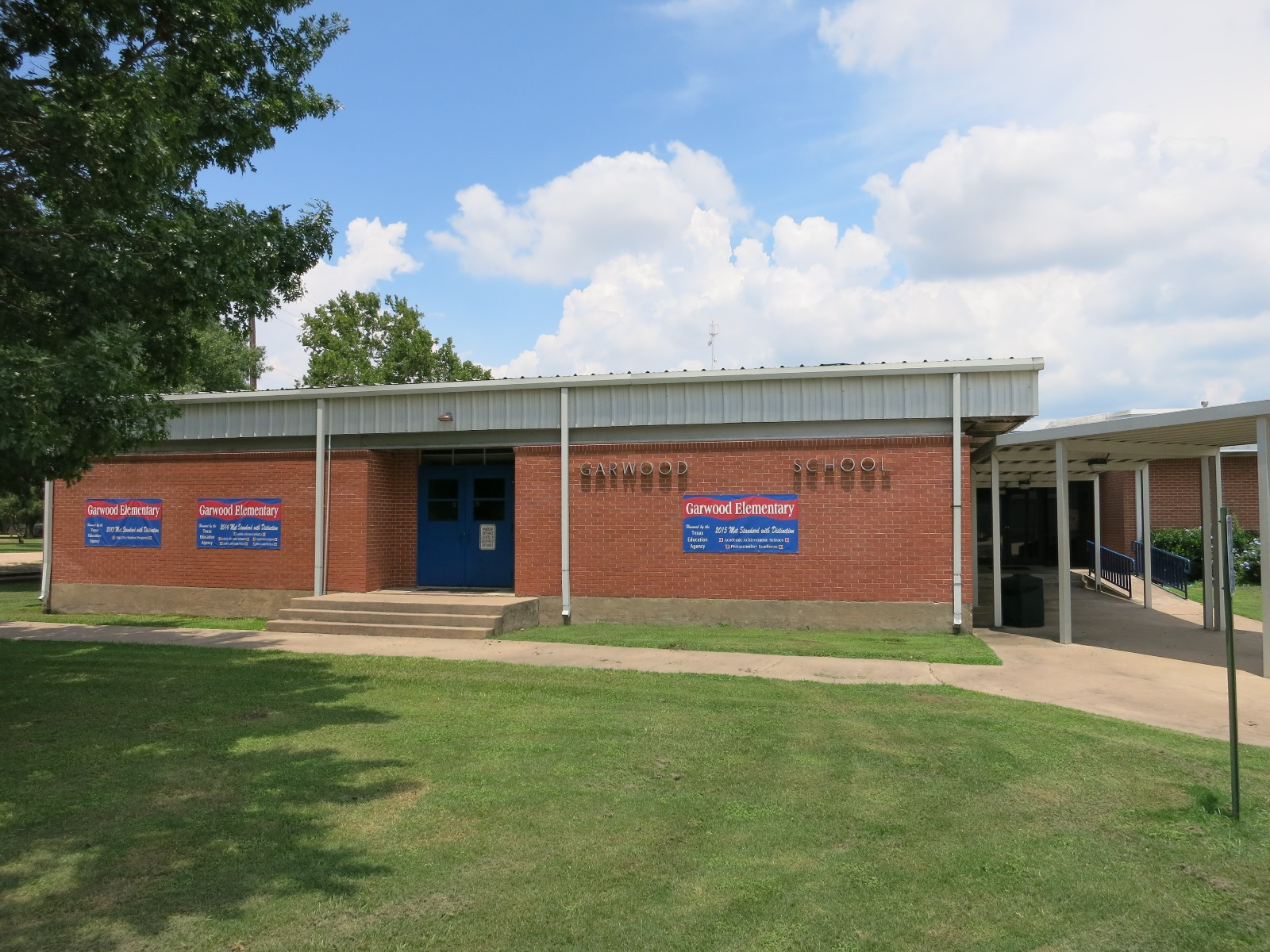
Garwood Elementary School is on TX 71 in Garwood.

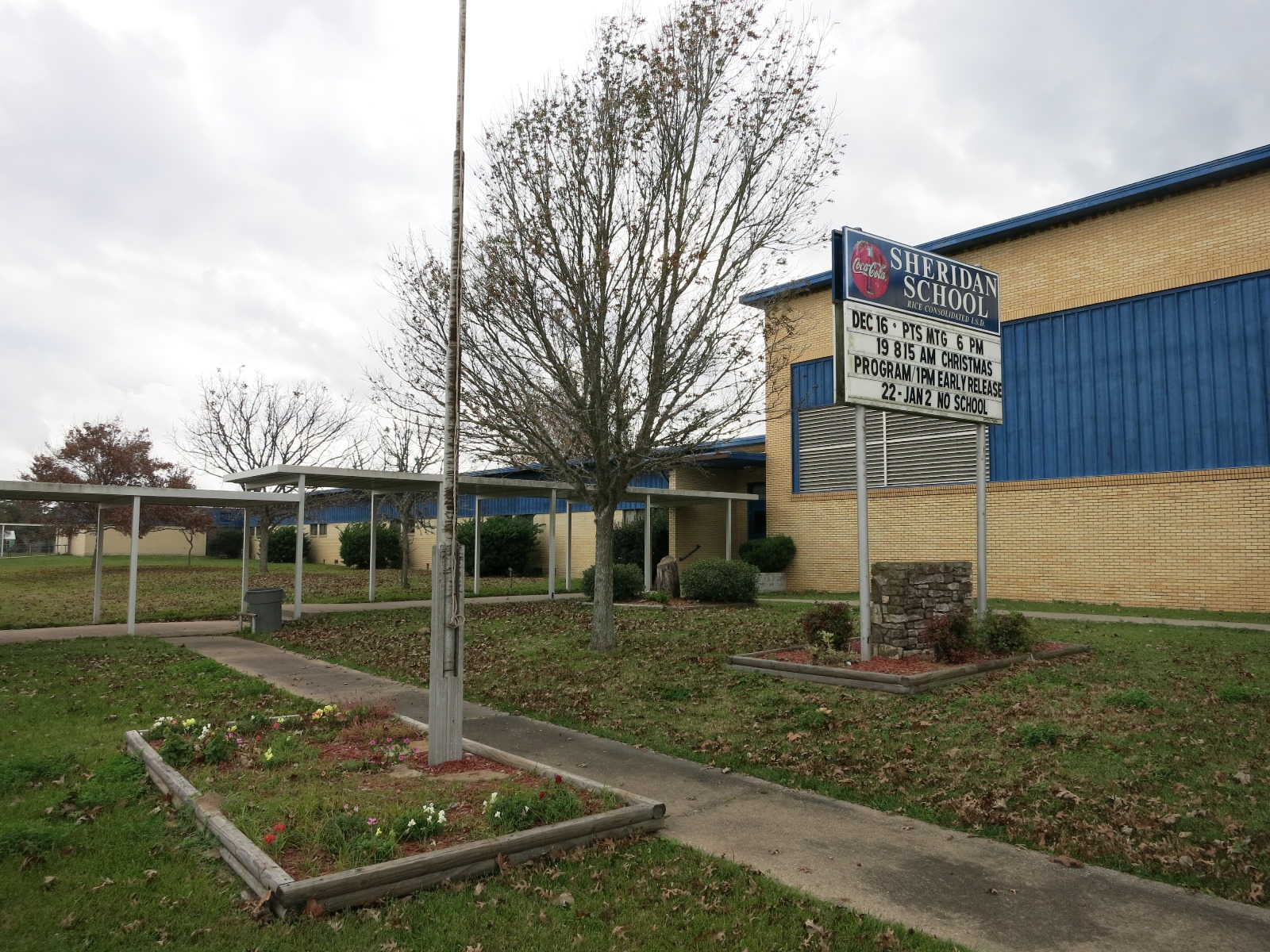
Sheridan Elementary School is on FM 2437 in Sheridan.
