= Chad Waligura =

American journalist

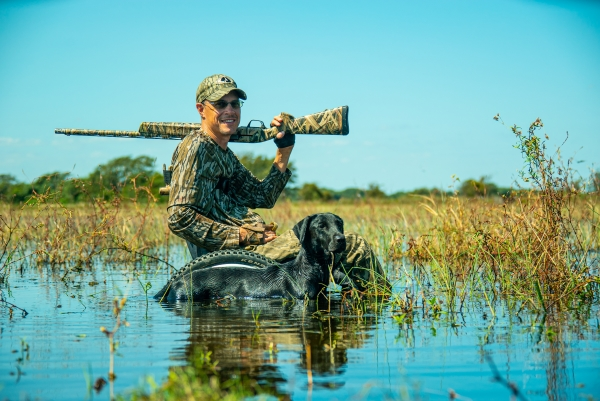
- Chad & Trixie
- Born: Chad Alan Waligura; March 19, 1969 (age 57)
- Education: Texas A&M University, University of Houston, Victoria
- Occupations: Outdoor writer, magazine editor, professional disabled hunter

Chad Alan Waligura (born March 19, 1969) is an American outdoor writer, magazine editor, and professional disabled hunter. It was for his work as a disabled hunter that he was named Buckmasters' 2003 Challenged Hunter of the Year and was chosen by Safari Club International for the Pathfinder Award in 2010.

== Life and career ==
Born the son of Judy Dore' Waligura of Crowley, Louisiana, and Randy Waligura of Garwood, Texas, Waligura grew up in the town of El Campo, Texas. At an early age, he was introduced to hunting and fishing by his father and grandfather, Ben Waligura.

On July 7, 1986, at age 17, Waligura suffered a paralyzing injury after diving into a swimming pool, fracturing his cervical vertebrae at the C-7 level. He spent the next three months at TIRR Memorial Hermann in Houston, Texas. After being discharged, Waligura returned to TIRR Memorial Hermann periodically to visit with patients to talk about outdoor life and to give presentations on adaptive equipment.

Waligura graduated from El Campo High School in 1988. In 1993, he graduated from Texas A&M University with a bachelor's degree in Wildlife & Fisheries Science. From there, Waligura went on to earn a Master of Education (M.Ed.) from the University of Houston, Victoria, in 2002.

In 1996, Waligura founded a website called Follow Me Outdoors, as an information source about disabled hunting and fishing. It was around this time that he began freelancing for mainstream hunting magazines. Waligura has been published in Buckmasters' Rack magazine, King's Hunting Illustrated, Eastman's Hunting Journal, Horizontal Bowhunter Magazine, UFFDA magazine, Turkey & Turkey Hunting, and the African Hunting Gazette. He was the cover story of Sports-N-Spokes magazine published by the Paralyzed Veterans of America on the March, 2010 issue.

Waligura became a founding member of the TIRR Peers Organization in 1997. TIRR Peers was formed in order to connect older, surviving TIRR veterans with new patients based on common injuries and/or interests.

In the year 2000, Waligura began organizing group duck and deer hunts for disabled outdoorsmen and women in the state of Texas

To date, Waligura has hunted in Mexico, Canada, Argentina and South Africa, as well as in Texas, Louisiana, Alabama, New Mexico, Colorado, Oklahoma, Kansas, Nebraska, Minnesota, Wisconsin and Wyoming.

In 2010, Waligura launched and became editor of an online magazine called Disabled Hunter Magazine for physically challenged outdoorsmen which was changed to Able Outdoors before publishing began in 2015.

In 2021, Chad teamed up with Ashlee Lundvall from Cody, Wyoming, in order to start filming videos for Able Outdoors and promote "able" sportsmen and women in the outdoors
