= Nada, Texas =

- Unincorporated community Census-designated place
- Location within the state of Texas Nada, Texas (the United States)
- Coordinates: 29°24′18″N 96°23′11″W
- Country: United States
- State: Texas
- County: Colorado

Area
  - Total: 6.80 sq mi (17.61 km^{2})
  - Land: 6.68 sq mi (17.29 km^{2})
  - Water: 0.12 sq mi (0.32 km^{2})
- Elevation: 154 ft (47 m)

Population (2020)
  - Total: 231
- Time zone: UTC-6 (Central (CST))
  - Summer (DST): UTC-5 (CDT)
- ZIP code: 77460
- Area code: 979
- GNIS feature ID: 1342352

Nada is an unincorporated community and census-designated place (CDP) in Colorado County, Texas, United States. It is located on State Highway 71 approximately midway between El Campo and Columbus. As of the 2020 census, Nada had a population of 231.

== Geography ==
Nada is situated along State Highway 71 in southern Colorado County about 3 miles (4.8 km) south of Garwood and 20 miles (32 km) south of Columbus.

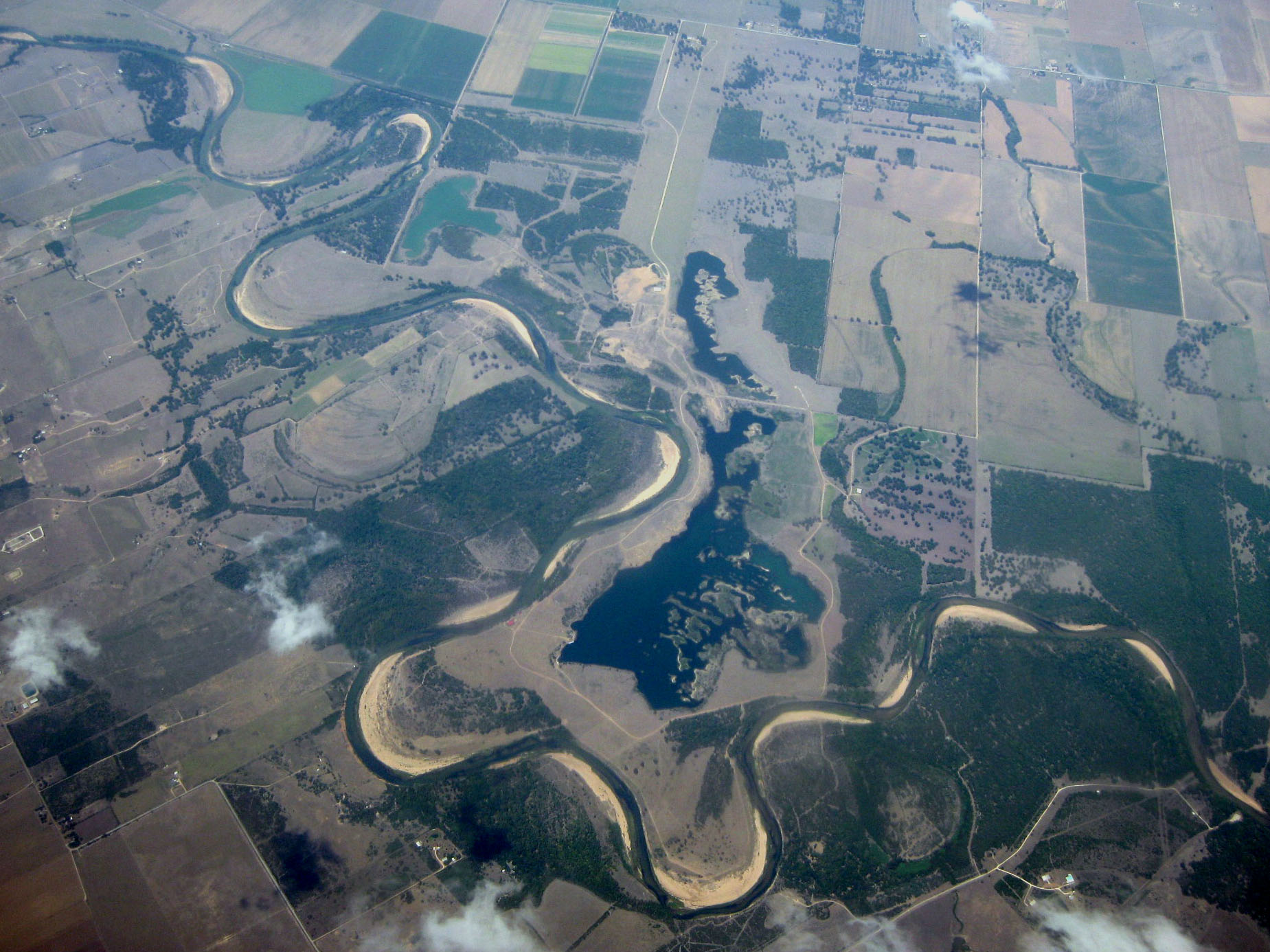
Aerial photo shows the Colorado River near Nada.

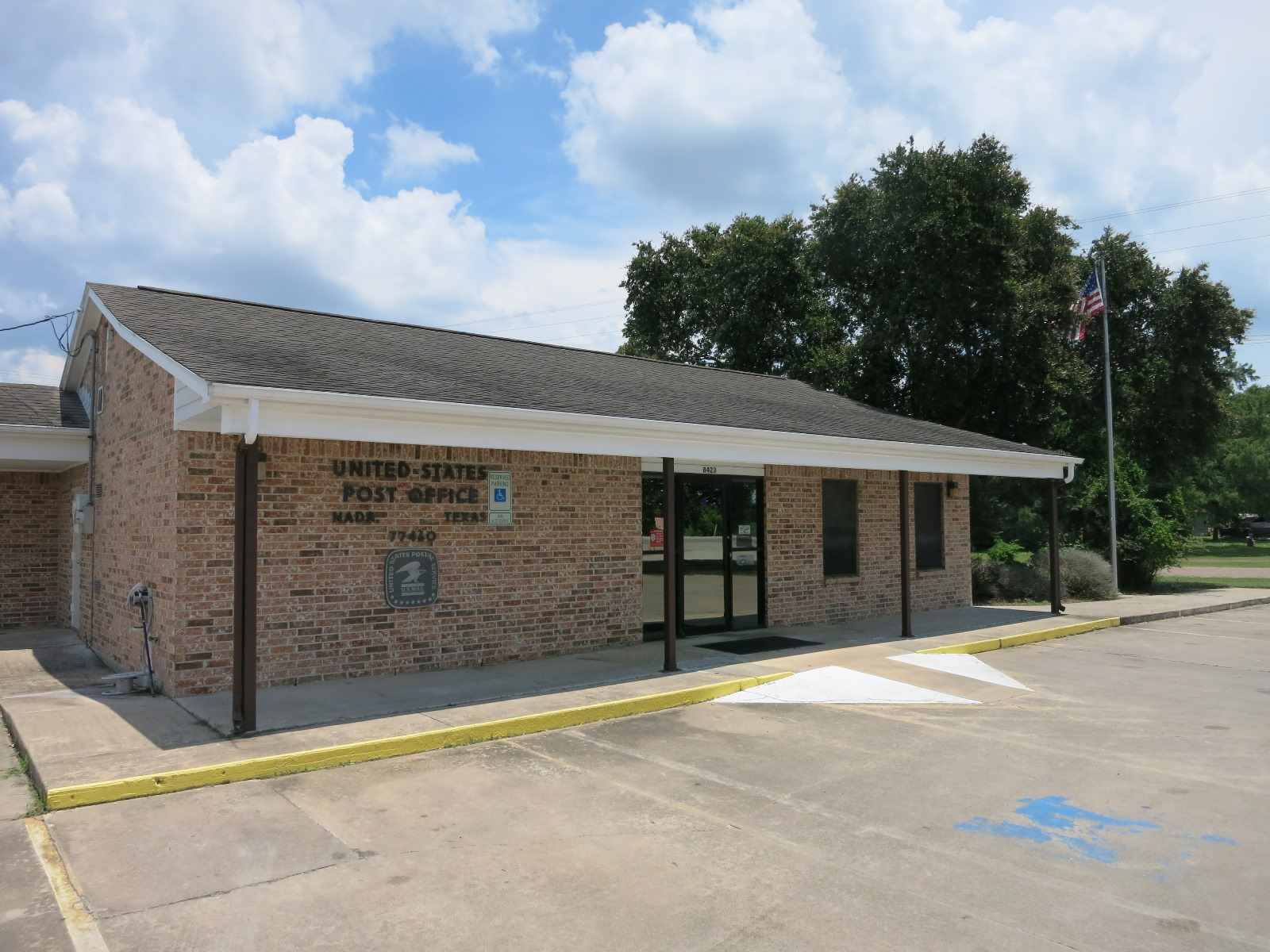
US post office is on Texas 71 in Nada.

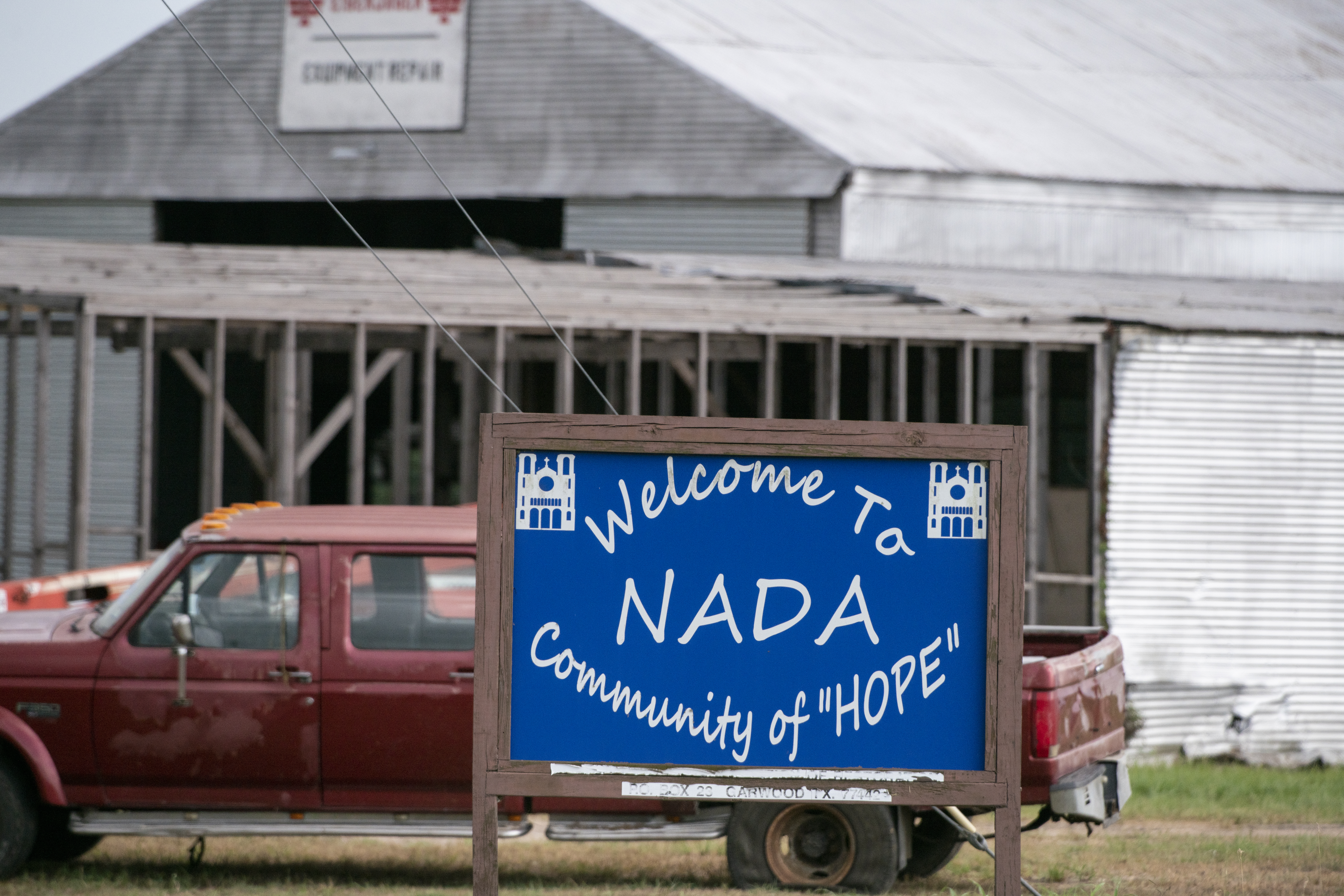
Nada community sign.

== History ==
The original name of the community was Vox Populi (Latin for "Voice of the People"). The present name is an Americanized version of the Czech word "naděje," meaning "hope." The first settlers were J. William Schoellmann and his family, who arrived in the area on February 15, 1881. Many of the early settlers that followed were Czechs and Germans from the Frelsburg area. The first church in Nada was dedicated on October 7, 1897 and a schoolhouse was constructed in 1899 that housed eighteen students. By the mid-1980s, the population was estimated at 165. It remained at that level through 2000.

Nada has a post office with the ZIP code 77460.

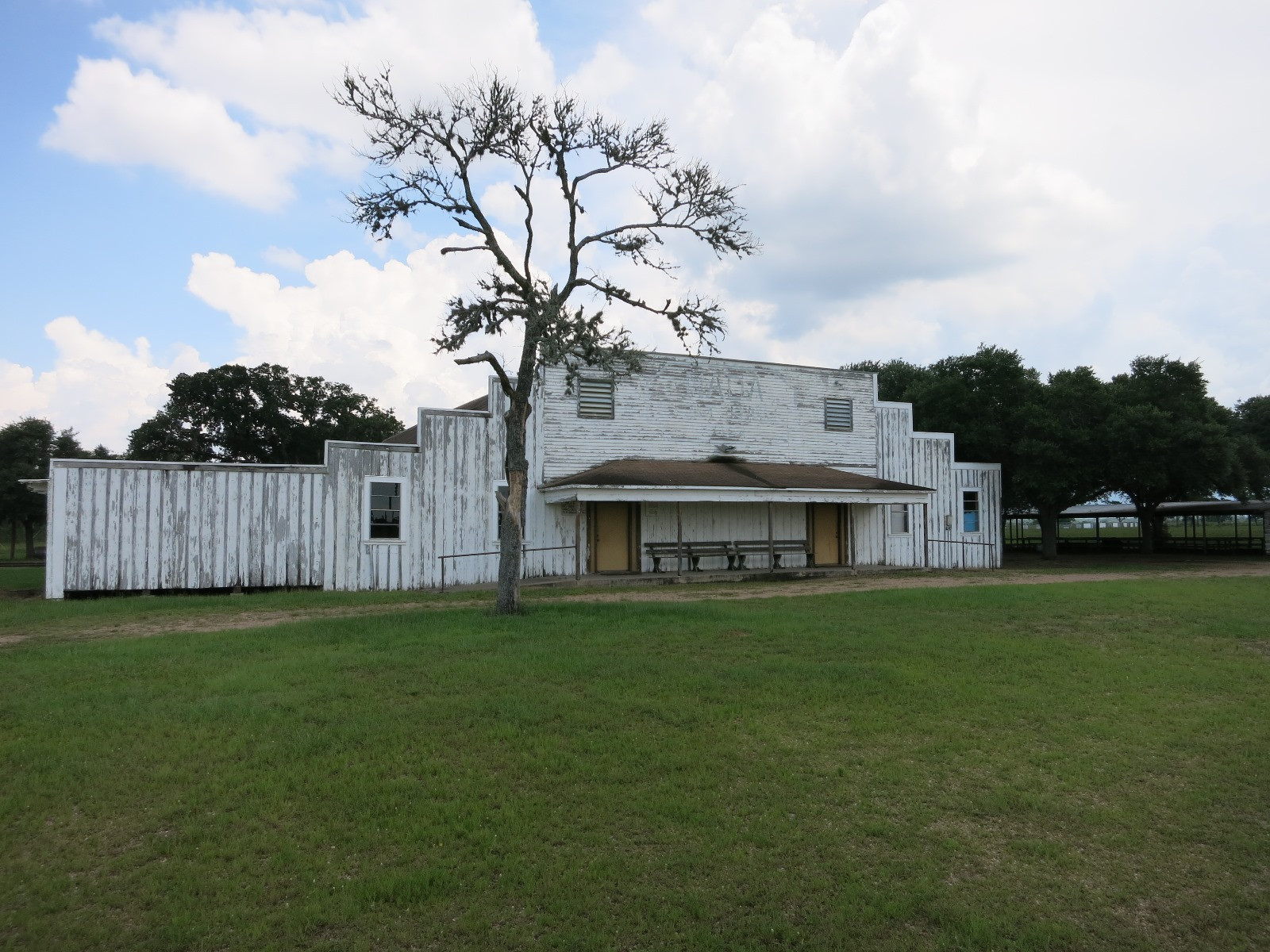
Nada community center is on Old Nada Road.

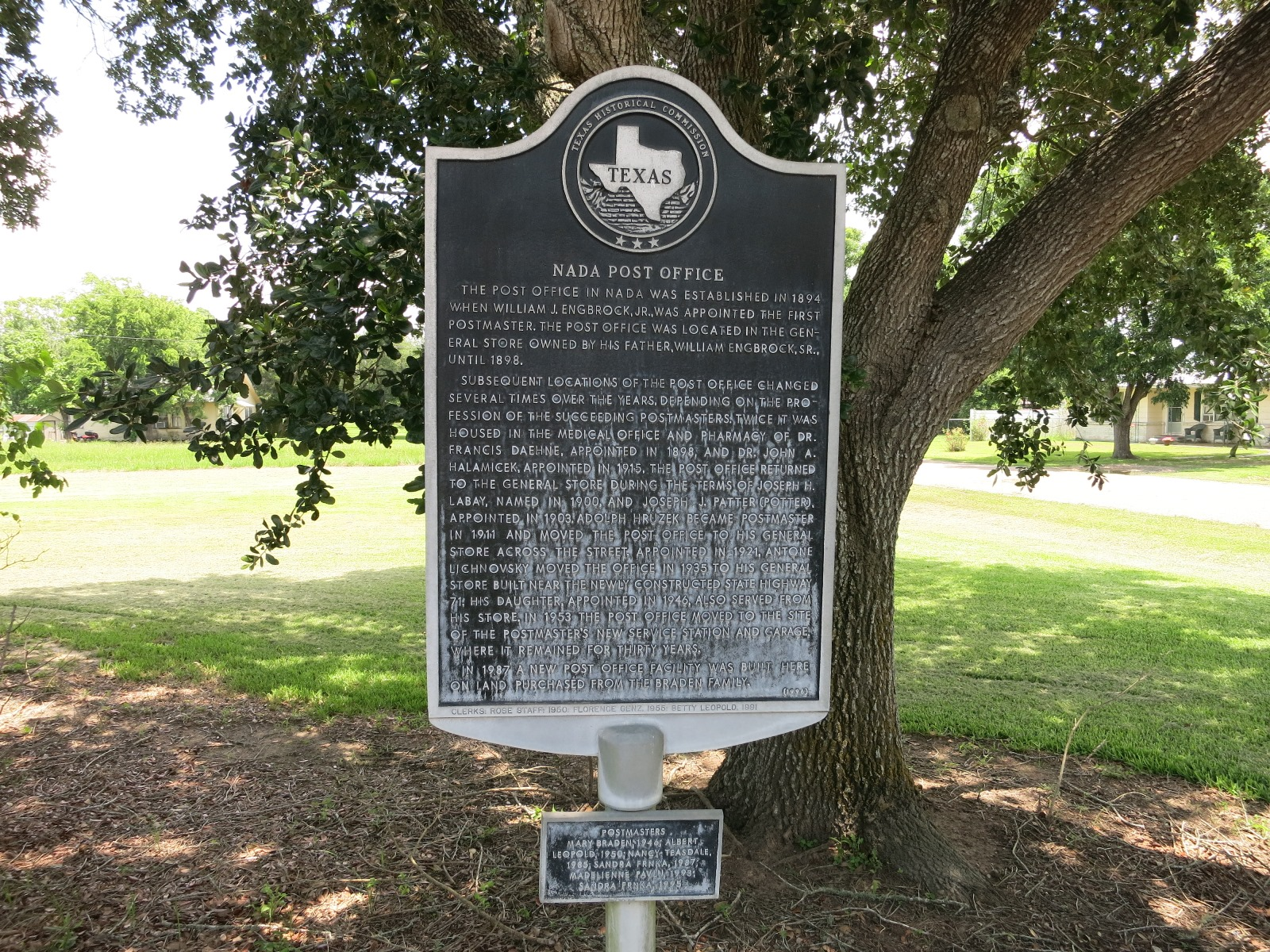
State historical marker is located at the post office.

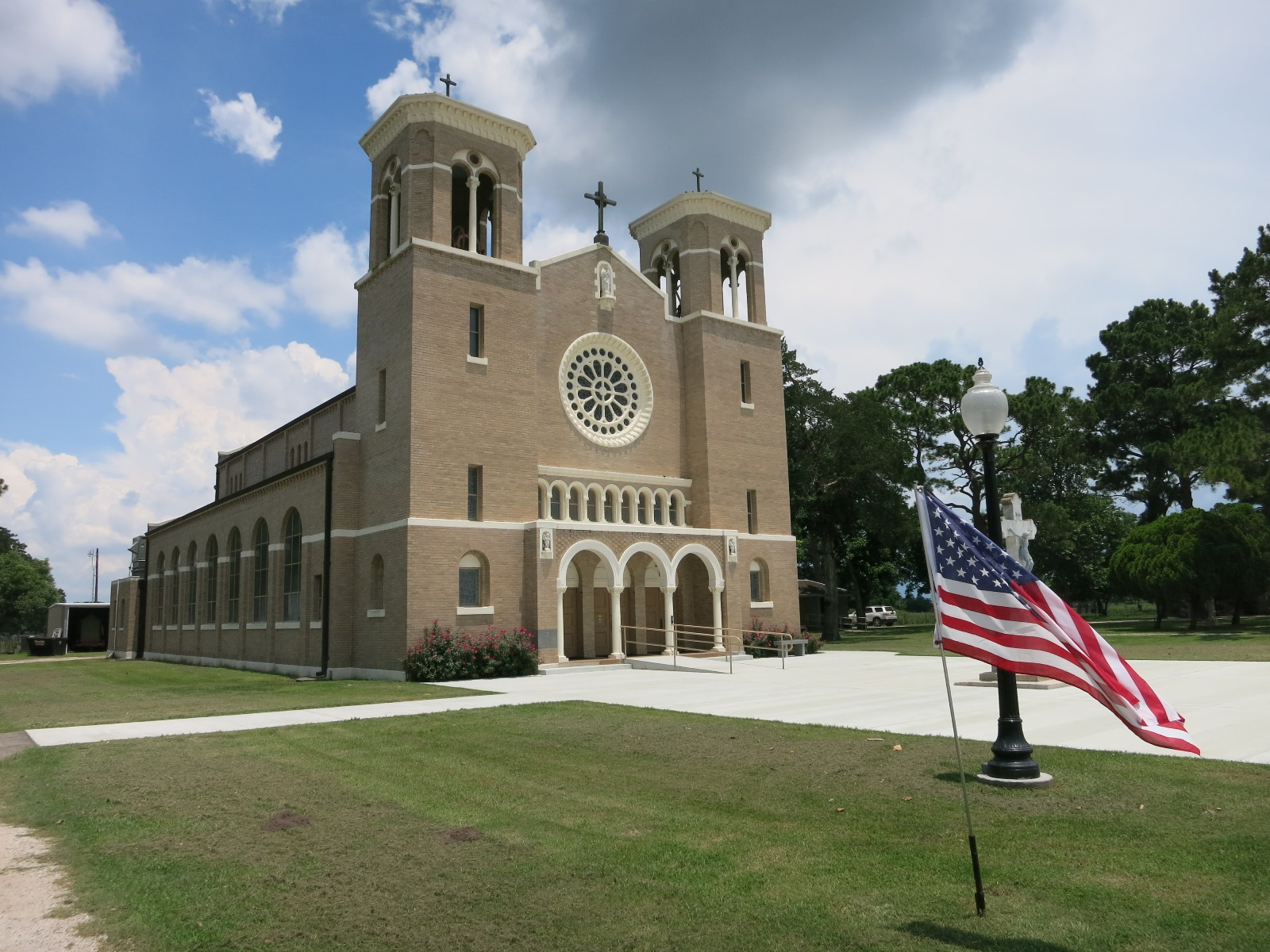
Saint Mary's Catholic Church serves Nada.

== Demographics ==
Historical population
Census	Pop.	Note	%±
2020	231		—
U.S. Decennial Census; 1850–1900 1910; 1920 1930 1940; 1950 1960 1970; 1980 1990 2000; 2010 2020

According to the Handbook of Texas, the community had an estimated population of 165 in 1986. Nada was first listed as a census-designated place in the 2020 U.S. census with a population of 231.

Nada CDP, Texas – Racial and ethnic composition Note: the US Census treats Hispanic/Latino as an ethnic category. This table excludes Latinos from the racial categories and assigns them to a separate category. Hispanics/Latinos may be of any race.
Race / Ethnicity (NH = Non-Hispanic)	Pop 2020	% 2020
White alone (NH)	200	86.58%
Black or African American alone (NH)	0	0.00%
Native American or Alaska Native alone (NH)	0	0.00%
Asian alone (NH)	0	0.00%
Native Hawaiian or Pacific Islander alone (NH)	0	0.00%
Other race alone (NH)	0	0.00%
Mixed race or Multiracial (NH)	7	3.03%
Hispanic or Latino (any race)	24	10.39%
Total	231	100.00%

== Education ==
Public education in the community of Nada is provided by the Rice Consolidated Independent School District.

In 1948, Nada's school district became part of the Garwood Independent School District, which merged with several other districts in 1970 to form the Rice Consolidated Independent School District.

The Texas Legislature assigns areas in Rice Consolidated ISD to Wharton County Junior College.

== Notable people ==
- Roman Catholic bishop Hugo Mark Gerbermann was born in Nada.
- Roman Catholic bishop Bernard Ferdinand Popp was born in Nada.
