= Haley Pham =

American YouTuber and author (born 2000)

- Pham at the 2026 Texas Book Festival
- Born: December 5, 2000 (age 25); Austin, Texas, U.S.
- Occupations: YouTuber; social media personality; author
- Spouse: Ryan Trahan (m. 2020)

YouTube information
- Channel: Haley Pham
- Years active: 2012–present
- Subscribers: 3.95 million
- Views: 568.7 million
- Last updated: May 30, 2026
- Website: haleypham.com

Haley Pham (born December 5, 2000) is an American YouTuber and author.

== Early life ==
Haley Pham was born to a Vietnamese mother and a White American father in Austin, Texas on December 5, 2000.

== Career ==
Pham first began her YouTube career in 2012, uploading videos focused on makeup and dance, before shifting to lifestyle vlogs about her life as a teenager. Starting in 2022, Pham significantly shifted to making content on books.

=== Writing career ===
Her debut romance novel Just Friends was published by Atria Books on March 3, 2026.

== Personal life ==
Pham is Christian. In 2020, she married fellow YouTuber Ryan Trahan. She is often featured or seen in Trahan's videos, including Trahan's viral "50 States in 50 Days" challenge.
