= Ryan Trahan =

American YouTuber and entrepreneur (born 1998)

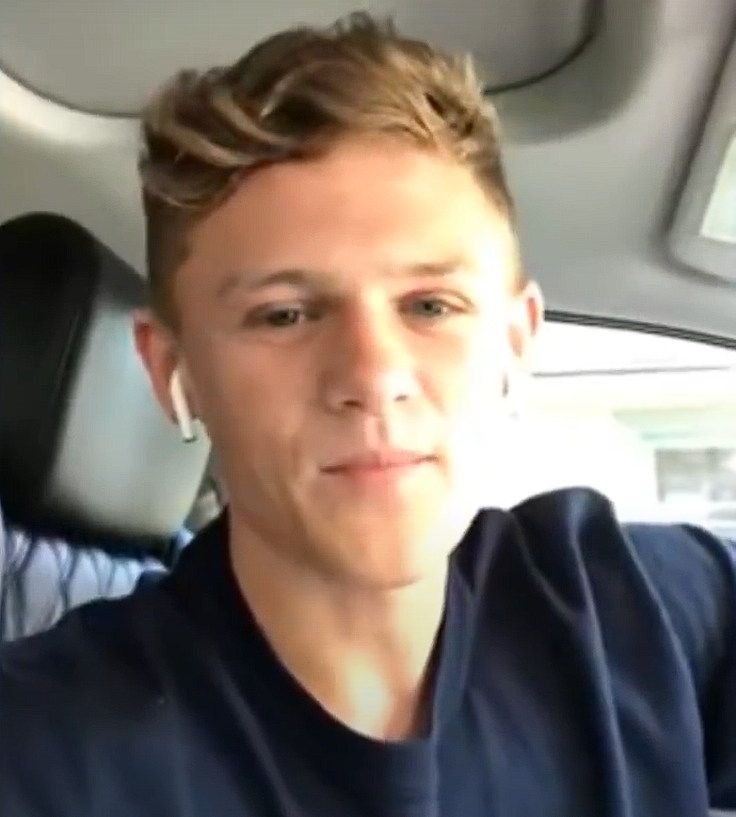
- Trahan in 2018
- Born: Ryan Michael Trahan; October 7, 1998 (age 28); Sugar Land, Texas, U.S.
- Education: Rice High School; Texas A&M University (dropped out)
- Occupations: YouTuber; vlogger; businessman
- Spouse: Haley Pham (m. 2020)

YouTube information
- Channels: Ryan Trahan; ryan trahan; ryan lol; ryan3000
- Years active: 2013–present
- Subscribers: 24.1 million
- Views: 6.7 billion
- Last updated: November 13, 2026
- Website: trahan.co

Ryan Michael Trahan (/treɪˈhæn/ tray-HAN; born October 7, 1998) is an American YouTuber. He is best known for his "penny series", which he has done several times since 2017, where he has a set amount of time to travel starting with only a penny. His “50 States in 50 Days” fundraiser for St. Jude Children's Research Hospital during the summer of 2025 raised more than $11 million.

== Early life and education ==
Ryan Michael Trahan was born on October 7, 1998, in Sugar Land, Texas. He attended Rice High School, where he graduated as a valedictorian in 2017. While in high school and then at Texas A&M University, Trahan was a cross country runner, placing third in the Aggieland Open Competition in 2017. Trahan eventually dropped out of Texas A&M University after the National Collegiate Athletic Association ruled him ineligible due to using his YouTube channel to share running videos while advertising his company as a student athlete. (Note: At the time, the National Collegiate Athletic Association had restrictions on student athletes taking sponsorships from brands; these rules were altered in June 2021.)

== Career ==
Trahan started his YouTube channel on October 27, 2013. Originally producing content on running, Trahan now creates a variety of content, largely focused on visiting one-star-rated establishments around the country.

Trahan was the winner of the "First Person" category at the 2023 13th Streamy Awards; he also participated in a "creator roundtable" before the ceremony and presented a portion of the event.

== Challenges & Fundraisers ==
=== Penny challenges ===
In June 2022, Trahan started a month-long series in which he attempted to travel from California to North Carolina to deliver MrBeast a single penny, using only funds from the original penny. Inspired by Gary Vaynerchuk, he had previously completed similar challenges, in which he had tried to convert a penny into a thousand dollars and convert a penny into funds to buy a house. Trahan announced that the 2022 "Penny Challenge" would also serve as a fundraiser for Feeding America, and set a $100,000 goal. By the end of the challenge, he had raised $1.38 million.

Trahan financed the challenge through completing online surveys, mowing lawns, dog walking, DoorDash deliveries, and selling items such as soft drinks, bottled water, and golf balls, among other methods. To incentivize donations, Trahan would reset his funds to an original penny for a $50,000 donation and pledged to get a tattoo of the donor's design if someone donated $100,000. The series was largely sponsored by PayPal Honey.

The following year, Trahan announced he would be doing the challenge again, aiming to get from Paris to New York City in one week while raising $250,000 for Water.org. With the support of the public, Trahan raised over $400,000.

=== "50 States in 50 Days" Challenge ===
In June 2025, Trahan announced that he and his wife, Haley Pham, would visit all 50 U.S. states in 50 days, staying in a unique Airbnb in each one, with a goal of raising $1,000,000 for St. Jude Children's Research Hospital. The project attracted the attention of several celebrities, YouTubers, and brands, including T-Mobile, Airbnb, Kia, Hobby Lobby, Lectric eBikes, Staple Games, MrBeast, Starbucks, Paramount, and Mark Rober. To encourage donations, Trahan created a series of incentives, including a series of penalties from a mechanical device called the Wheel of Doom, which he had to spin every time a donor donated $50,000 or more. As of January 2026, the fundraiser has raised over $11.65 million.

== Business ventures ==
Trahan started a water bottle brand in 2016 named Neptune Bottle with his friend Caden Wiese. Trahan eventually left Texas A&M University after the National Collegiate Athletic Association ruled him ineligible due to using his YouTube channel to share running videos while advertising his company as a student athlete. Although Trahan sought a waiver with the association allowing him to continue running his business while remaining an athlete, he dropped out of university to continue working on the business and his YouTube channel. According to Trahan, in the first year of its existence, Neptune Bottle had earned over $50,000 in revenue. In 2023, he started a clothing line, Howdy Howdy.

In 2024, Trahan announced that he had become co-owner (with Tyler Merrick) and chief creative officer for Joyride Sweets, which produces non-GMO, vegan, and low-carbohydrate candy products. On the day of the initial product's release, it sold out at Target. Trahan established a mascot to represent Joyride by the name of Joyride Jerry. On June 14, 2025, Joyride broke the Guinness World Record for "Most photos of people holding candy uploaded to Instagram in one hour" when fans uploaded 1,733 photos of themselves holding the product.

=== Lawsuit ===
Mondelez International filed a complaint against Joyride Sweets in the U.S. District Court for the Northern District of Illinois on November 2, 2026. Mondelez alleges in the filing that Joyride's candy 'Sour Smacks' is a copycat of their Sour Patch Kids candy.

== Personal life ==
Trahan lives in Austin, Texas. In 2020, he married fellow YouTuber Haley Pham.

He is a Christian. Trahan came to the faith after initially trying to challenge his wife's beliefs while they were dating. He described himself as a "cynical atheist”. In July 2020, he started to feel unfulfilled with life despite his earnings from his YouTube career. That led him to take "a lot less cynical approach towards asking questions." Trahan has stated that around that time he "did land on Jesus. I started developing a relationship with God...Now it's my source of joy. It is my source of love. It is my source of everything."

== Awards and nominations ==
| Year | Ceremony | Category | Result | Ref. |
|---|---|---|---|---|
| 2022 | 12th Streamy Awards | Creator For Social Good | Nominated | |
| 2022 | 12th Streamy Awards | Breakout Creator | Won | |
| 2023 | 13th Streamy Awards | Creator of the Year | Nominated | |
| 2023 | 13th Streamy Awards | First Person | Won | |
