= Garwood, Texas =

- Unincorporated community Census-designated place
- Location within the state of Texas Garwood, Texas (the United States)
- Coordinates: 29°26′59″N 96°23′49″W
- Country: United States
- State: Texas
- County: Colorado
- Elevation: 154 ft (47 m)
- Time zone: UTC-6 (Central (CST))
  - Summer (DST): UTC-5 (CDT)
- ZIP code: 77442
- Area code: 979
- GNIS feature ID: 1336419

Garwood is an unincorporated community and census-designated place (CDP) in Colorado County, Texas, United States. As of the 2020 census, Garwood had a population of 510.

== History ==
The Red Bluff Irrigation System was constructed in 1896 by Marcus H. Townsend, W. T. Burford, and T. A. Hill to draw rice farmers to the region. By 1901, several local farmers were cultivating rice. Ed R. Frnka moved the first building on the townsite in 1901 as well; Townsend offered Frnka the property for his building. In memory of Townsend's friend and Houston lawyer Hiram Morgan Garwood, the community was renamed Garwood. The first chapel and post office in the village were founded in 1901. An extra structure was relocated to Garwood in 1902 and put to use as a hotel. Garwood participated in a land advertising scam in 1906. Agents would give photos of crops, such as orange groves, to their victims that had been taken somewhere else but were purportedly from Colorado County. Unseen, the land was purchased, and most purchasers departed upon seeing Garwood and the surrounding acreage. 1909–1912 saw Garwood publish two newspapers. In 1910, there was a bank there, and 500 people were living in Garwood. The Gulf, Colorado and Santa Fe Railway served the town, which had 750 persons by 1915. The majority of the establishments on the east side of the main street were destroyed by fire in 1922. After these were restored, the town expanded gradually. Garwood recorded twelve establishments and a 975-person population estimate in 1990 and 2000, with 37 businesses. It stayed at 975 in 2010 then went down to 510 in 2020.

Although it is unincorporated, Garwood has a post office with the ZIP code 77442.

== Geography ==
Garwood is situated at the junction of Texas State Highway 71 and Farm to Market Road 950 in southern Colorado County, 13 mi (21 km) southwest of Eagle Lake, 20 mi (32 km) south of Columbus, and 17 mi (27 km) north of El Campo.

There is a bridge on FM 950 that crosses the Colorado River.

== Demographics ==
Historical population
Census	Pop.	Note	%±
2020	510		—
U.S. Decennial Census; 1850–1900 1910; 1920 1930 1940; 1950 1960 1970; 1980 1990 2000; 2010 2020

Garwood first appeared as a census-designated place in the 2020 U.S. census.

=== 2020 census ===
Garwood CDP, Texas – Racial and ethnic composition Note: the US Census treats Hispanic/Latino as an ethnic category. This table excludes Latinos from the racial categories and assigns them to a separate category. Hispanics/Latinos may be of any race.
Race / Ethnicity (NH = Non-Hispanic)	Pop 2020	% 2020
White alone (NH)	267	52.35%
Black or African American alone (NH)	57	11.18%
Native American or Alaska Native alone (NH)	0	0.00%
Asian alone (NH)	2	0.39%
Native Hawaiian or Pacific Islander alone (NH)	0	0.00%
Other race alone (NH)	0	0.00%
Mixed race or Multiracial (NH)	5	0.98%
Hispanic or Latino (any race)	179	35.10%
Total	510	100.00%

== Climate ==
The climate in this area is characterized by hot, humid summers and generally mild to cool winters. According to the Köppen Climate Classification system, Garwood has a humid subtropical climate, abbreviated "Cfa" on climate maps.

== Education ==
Garwood's first school opened in 1904. Public education in the community of Garwood is provided by the Rice Consolidated Independent School District. Zoned campuses include Garwood School (grades K-6; located in Garwood), Rice Junior High School (grades 7-8), and Rice High School (grades 9-12).

The designated community college for Rice CISD is Wharton County Junior College.

== Media ==
KPUY 97.3 FM

== Notable people ==
- Henry Frnka, football player, coach, and college athletics administrator, was born in Garwood.
- Randy Waligura, father of hunter Chad Waligura.

== Gallery ==
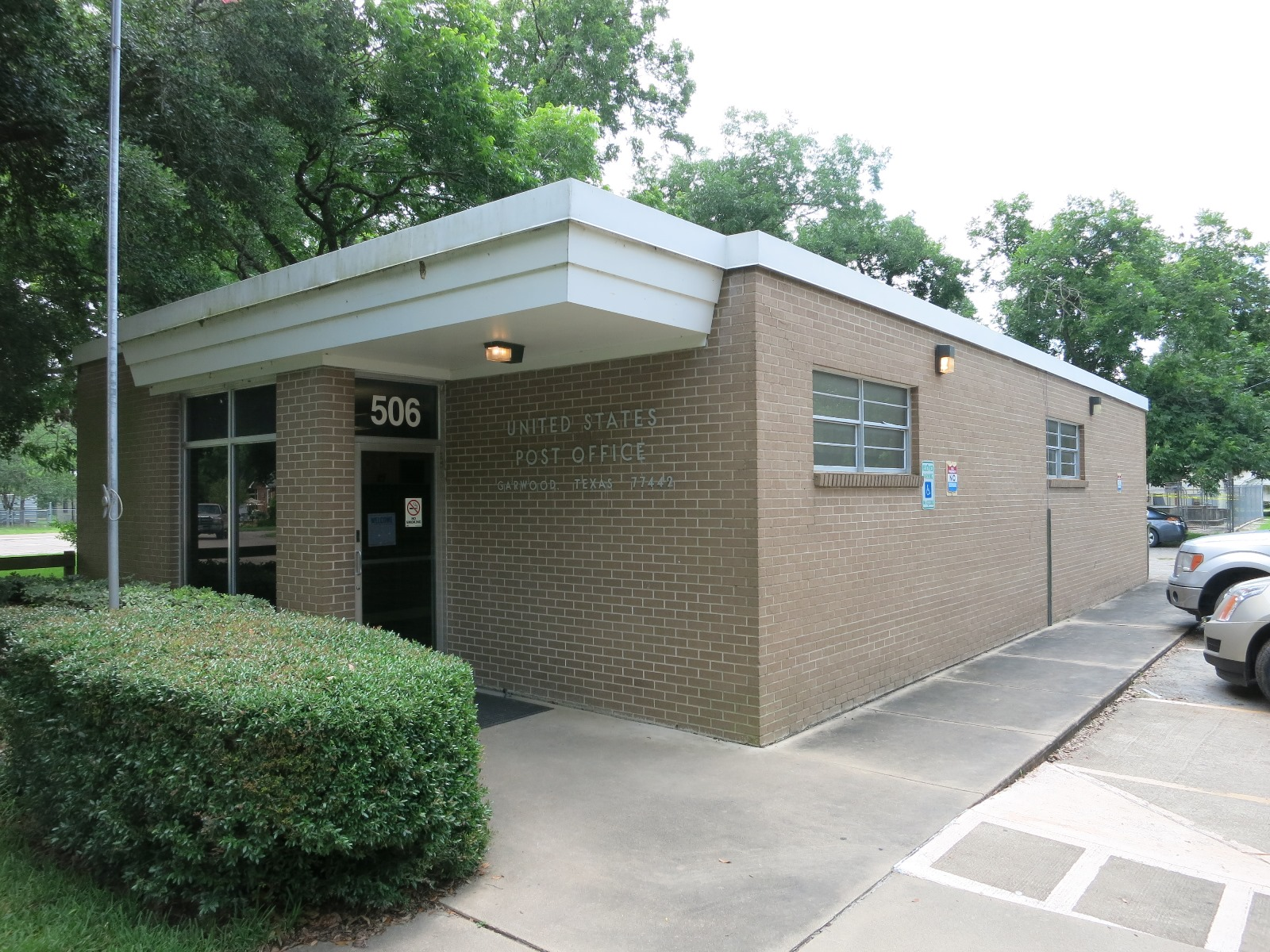
US post office is located on Arthur Street.

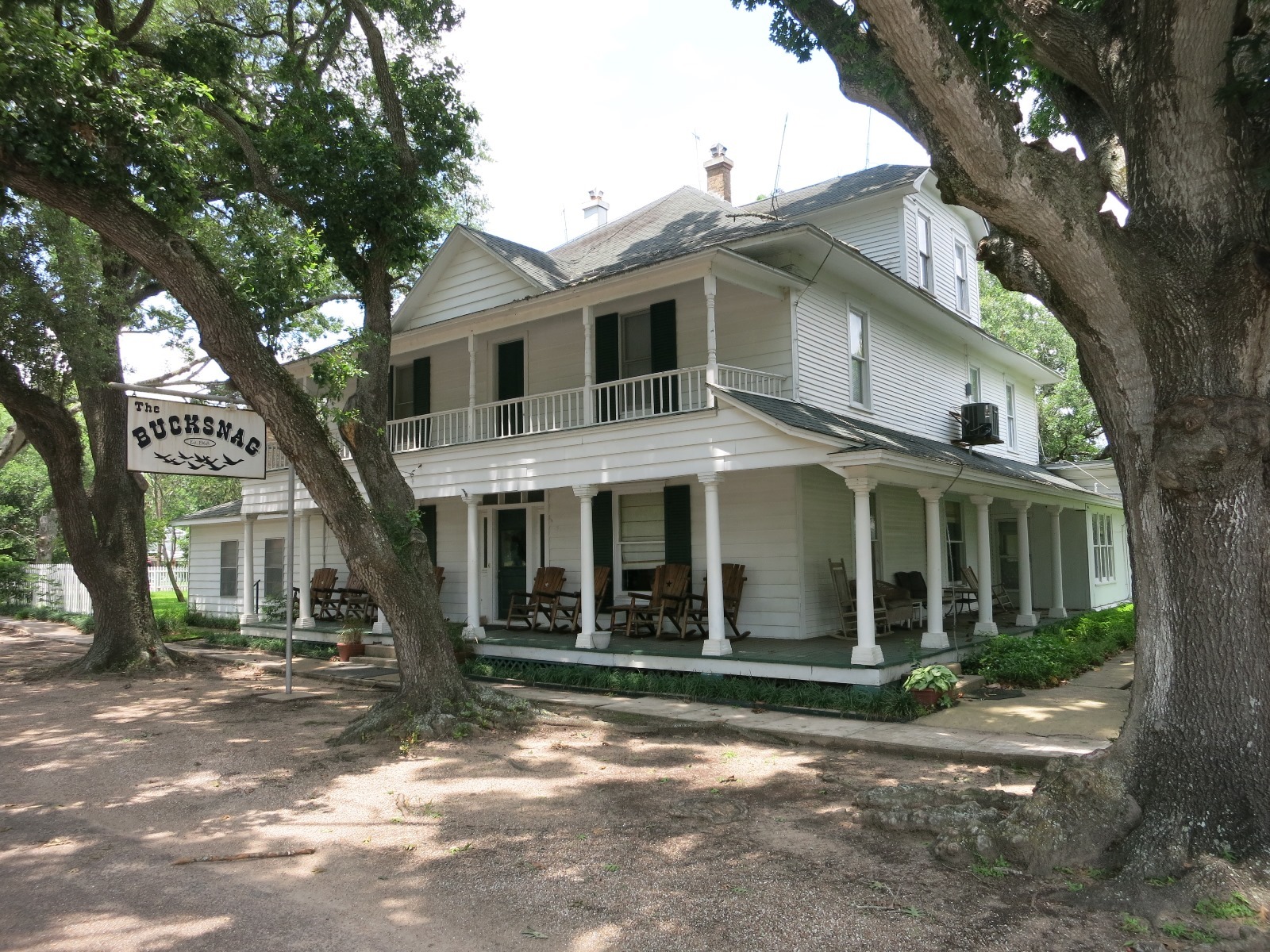
Bucksnag Hunting Club is in a grand old house.

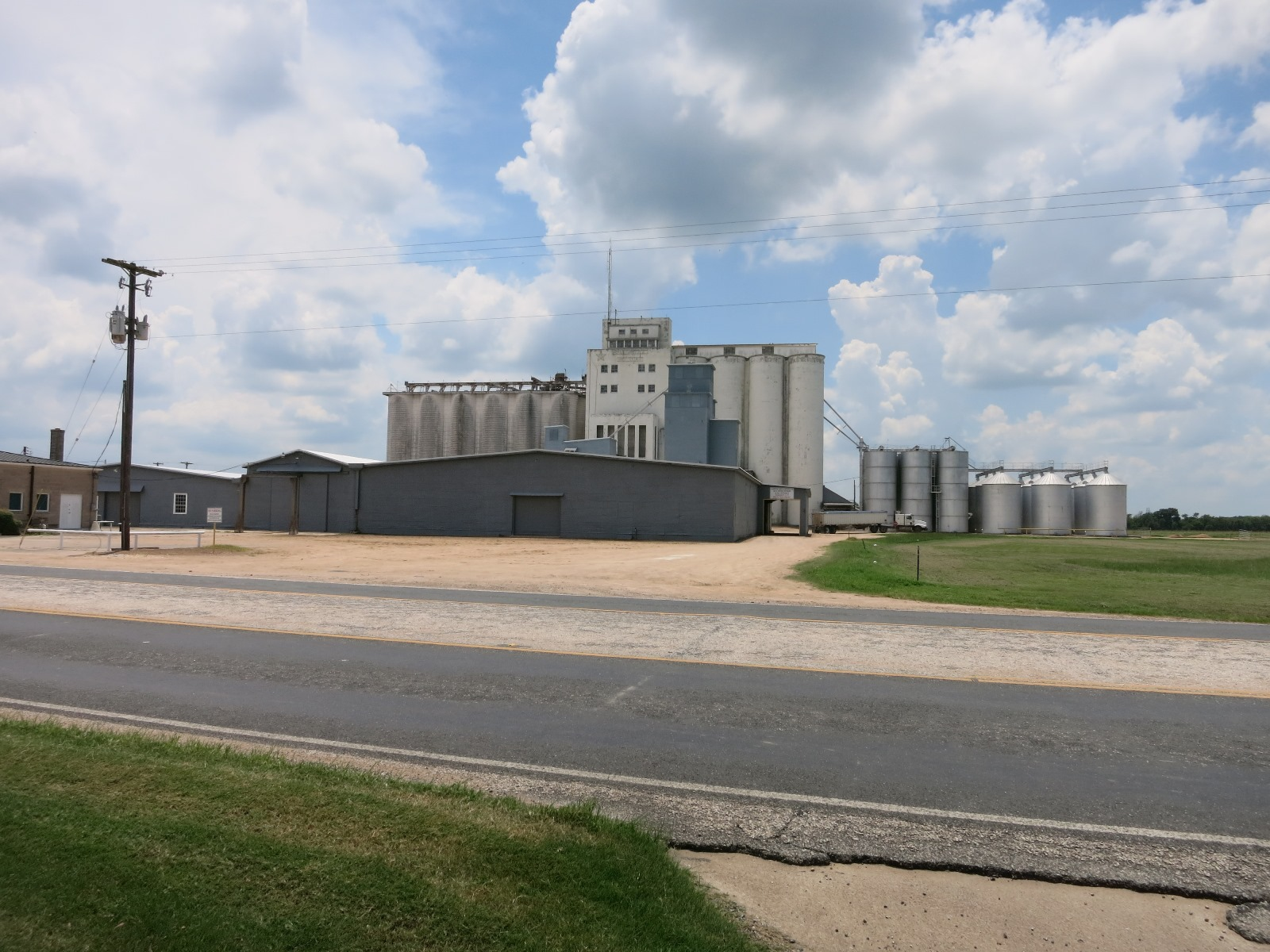
Silos can be seen on Texas 71 across from the school.

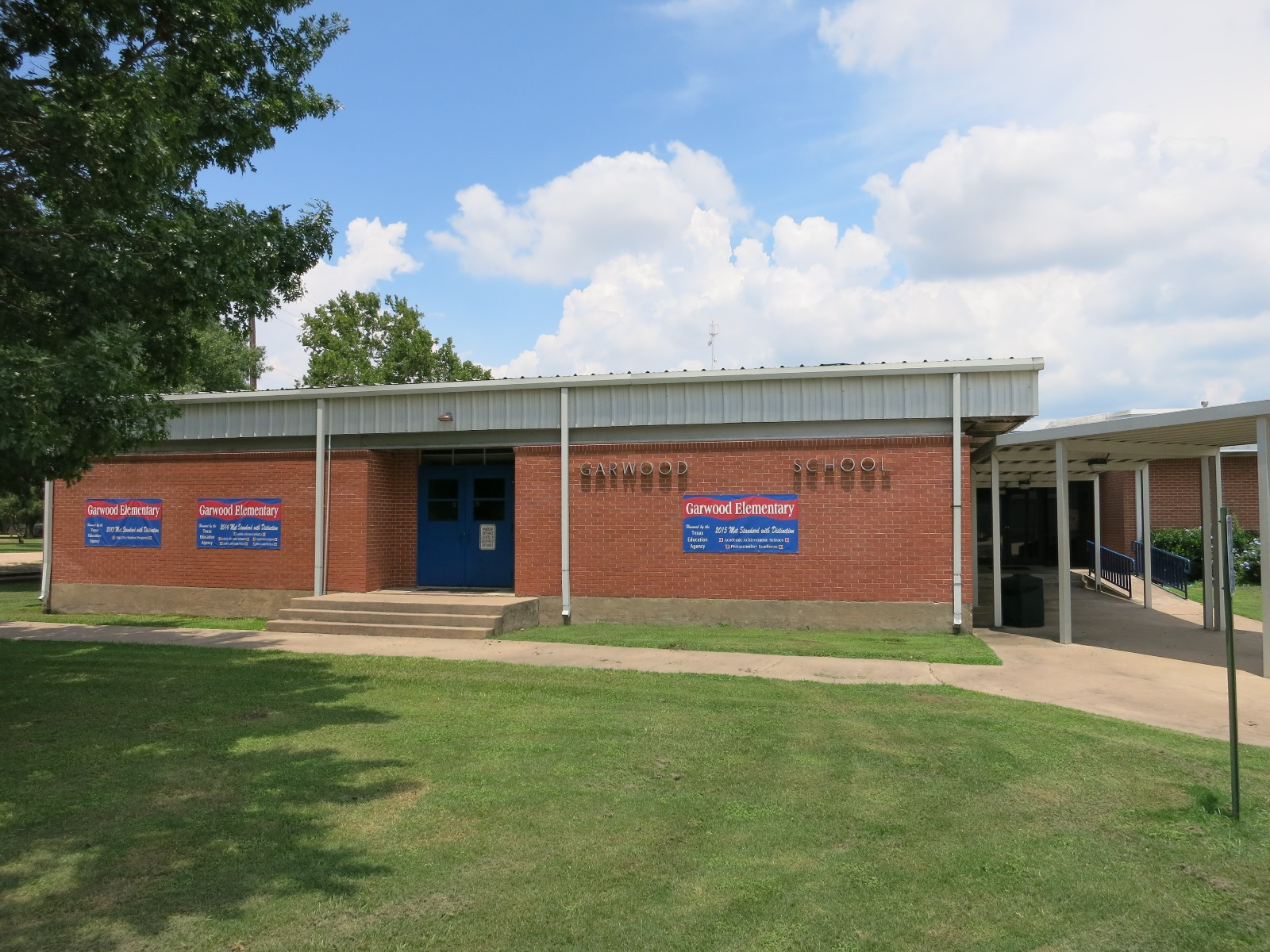
Garwood Elementary School (Rice CISD) on Texas 71
