= Mintz (disambiguation) =

Mintz is a Jewish (Ashkenazic) surname of German origin.

Mintz may also refer to:

- Mintz, Levin, Cohn, Ferris, Glovsky, and Popeo, American attorney firm
- Mintz Peak, Marie Byrd Land, Antarctica

== See also ==
- Mentz
- Minc / Mints / Minz
- Munz / Muntz
