= Písek (disambiguation) =

Písek is a town in Písek District, South Bohemian Region, Czech Republic.

Písek or Pisek may also refer to:

== Czech Republic ==
- Písek (Frýdek-Místek District), a municipality and village in the Moravian-Silesian Region
- Písek (Hradec Králové District), a municipality and village in the Hradec Králové Region
- Písek, a village and part of Líšťany (Plzeň-North District) in the Plzeň Region

== United States ==
- Pisek, North Dakota, a city in Walsh County, North Dakota
- Pisek, Texas, a ghost town in Colorado County, Texas
