= Muenz =

Muenz is a surname. Notable people with the surname include:

- Richard Muenz (born 1948), American actor and baritone

== See also ==
- Munz
