= Bernardo, Texas =

- Unincorporated community
- Location within the state of Texas Bernardo (the United States)
- Coordinates: 29°45′39″N 96°23′32″W
- Country: United States
- State: Texas
- County: Colorado
- Elevation: 253 ft (77 m)
- Time zone: UTC-6 (Central (CST))
  - Summer (DST): UTC-5 (CDT)
- ZIP code: 78933
- Area code: 979
- GNIS feature ID: 1330444

Bernardo is an unincorporated community in northeastern Colorado County, in the U.S. state of Texas. According to the Handbook of Texas, the community had a population of 155 in 2000.

== History ==
German immigrants arrived in Texas in 1845 as members of the Adelsverein and were followed by other German immigrants. Instead of moving to the authorized colonization area, the Fisher-Miller land grant in west central Texas, where many German settlers had already established themselves, decided to stay where the frontier circumstances were less difficult. Because of the topography in the area, Bernardo was formerly known as Bernardo Prairie. It was formerly known as Braden, and among the first inhabitants were several families bearing that name. The community was situated near a major highway connecting Houston to inland towns and settlements. It functioned as a dumping ground for transporting cotton to Mexico during the American Civil War. Nonetheless, it stayed an agricultural and ranching hamlet with sporadic houses and farms rather than growing into a sizable settlement. From 1898 until 1917, Bernardo had its own post office. Bernardo had a general store, a volunteer fire department, and 187 registered voters in its precinct in 1986. Even though individuals from Houston and the neighboring areas were buying land, some of the original settlers' descendants continued to reside in the area. The population was 155 in 1990. In 2000, the population did not change.

== Geography ==
Bernardo is located at the intersection of Farm to Market Road 949 and Bernardo Road between Interstate 10 and Cat Spring, 12 mi (19 km) northeast of Columbus in Colorado County. It is also on the south bank of the San Bernard River.

== Education ==
A Catholic school by the Sisters of Divine Providence was in Bernardo as early as 1872. This school joined the Mentz Catholic School in 1911, then joined the Columbus Independent School District after a public school was built in the area.

== Gallery ==
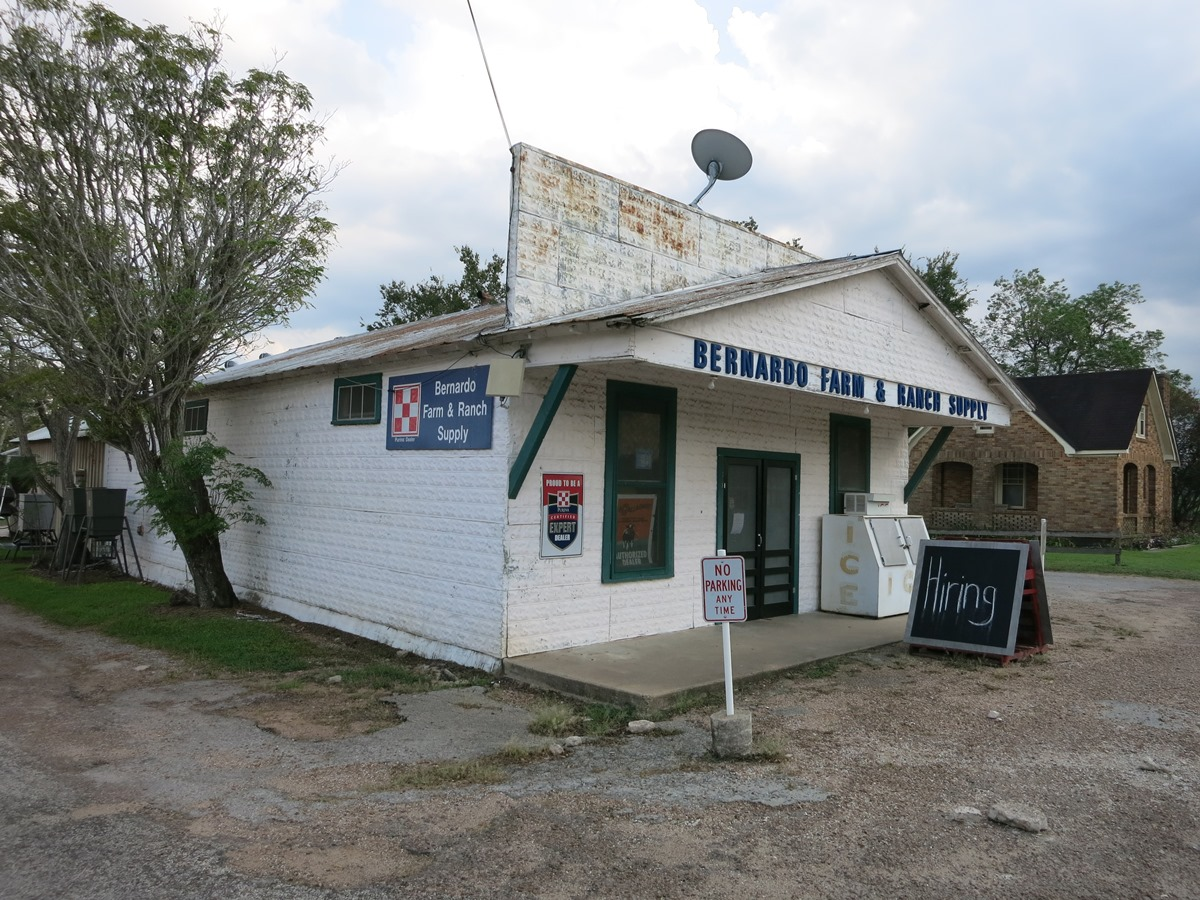
Bernardo Farm & Ranch Supply store on FM 949

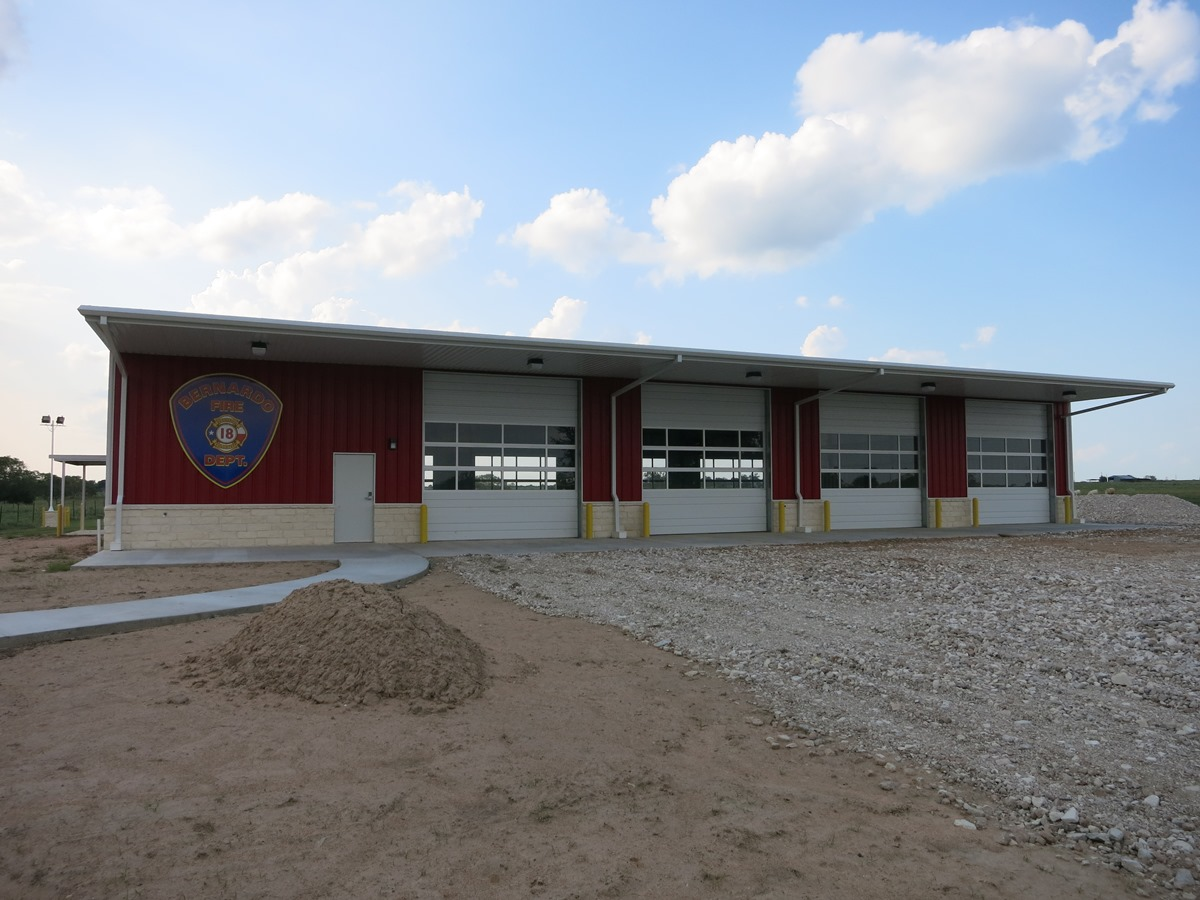
New Bernardo Volunteer Fire Department building

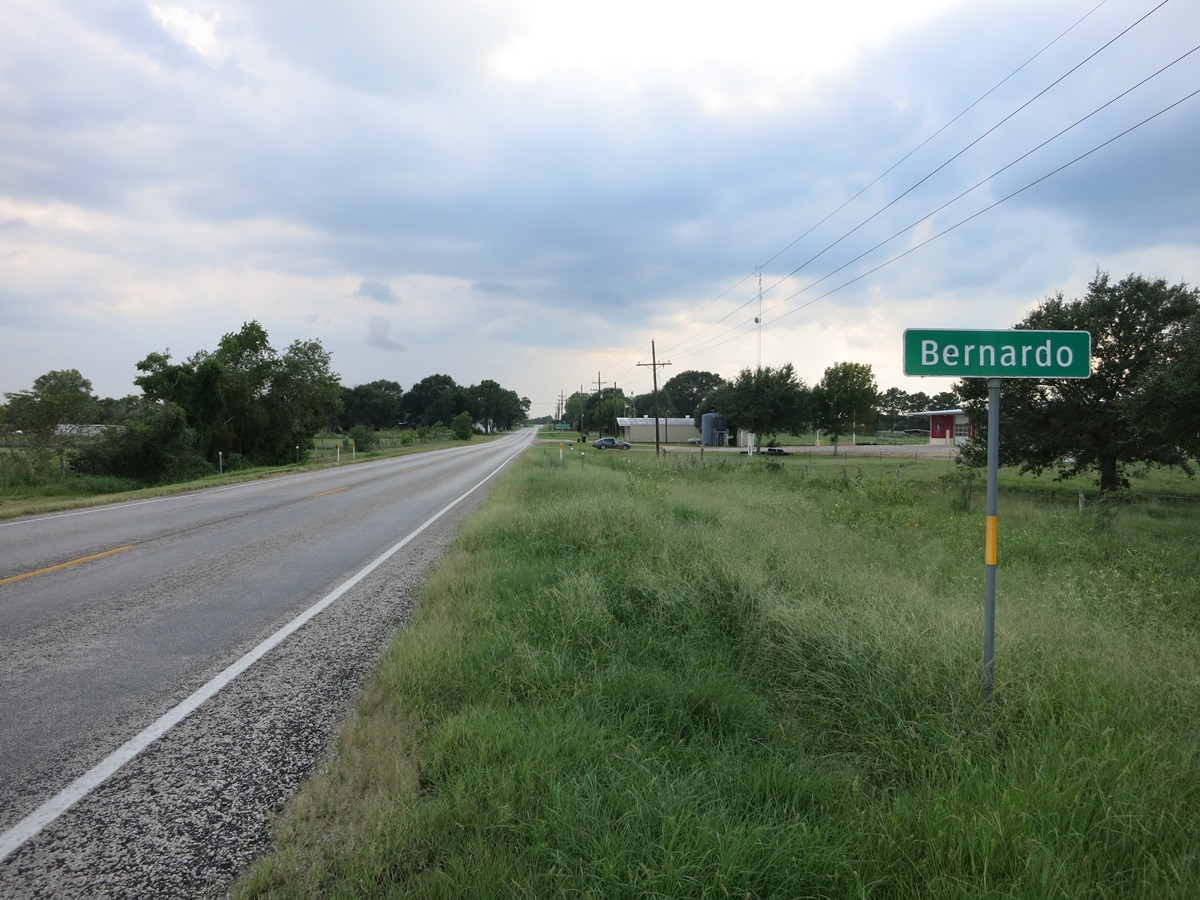
Looking southwest on FM 949
