= Osage, Texas =

Osage, Texas, may refer to:

- Osage, Colorado County, Texas
- Osage, Coryell County, Texas
