= Mentz =

Mentz is a former form of Mainz in Germany. It may also refer to:

== Places ==
- Mentz, New York
- Mentz, Texas

== People ==
- August Mentz (1867–1944), Danish botanist
- Hendrik Mentz (1877–1938), South African politician
- Henno Mentz (born 1979), South African rugby player
- Henry Mentz (1920–2005), American federal district judge, jurist and scholar
- Johann von Mentz (died 1583), Governor of Ösel (1576–1584)
- MJ Mentz (born 1982), South African rugby player (brother of Henno)

== See also ==
- Menz, a former province of Ethiopia
- Mintz
- Mentzer
- Mentzen (surname)
