= Shaws Bend, Texas =

- Unincorporated community
- Location within Texas Location within the United States
- Coordinates: 29°44′12″N 96°38′23″W
- Country: United States
- State: Texas
- County: Colorado
- Elevation: 246 ft (75 m)
- Time zone: UTC-6 (Central (CST))
  - Summer (DST): UTC-5 (CDT)
- Area code: 979
- GNIS feature ID: 1379065

Shaws Bend is an unincorporated community in Colorado County, Texas, United States. According to the Handbook of Texas, the community had a population of 100 in 2000.

== Geography ==
Shaws Bend is located on Farm to Market Road 1890 in a Colorado River bend, 5 mi (8.0 km) northwest of Columbus in north-central Colorado County.

== Education ==
In the 1870s, Shaws Bend had segregated schools for Black and White students. Today, Shaws Bend is served by the Columbus Independent School District.
