= Mentzen (surname) =

Mentzen is a surname. Notable people with the name include:

- Antje Tesche-Mentzen, German painter
- Mieczysław Mentzen, Polish mathematician
- Sławomir Mentzen, Polish politician and leader of the Confederation Liberty and Independence

== See also ==
- Mentz (disambiguation)
- Mentzer
