= Chesterville, Texas =

- Unincorporated community
- Location within the state of Texas Chesterville (the United States)
- Coordinates: 29°36′36″N 96°12′27″W
- Country: United States
- State: Texas
- County: Colorado
- Elevation: 156 ft (48 m)
- Time zone: UTC-6 (Central (CST))
  - Summer (DST): UTC-5 (CDT)
- ZIP code: 77435
- Area code: 979

Chesterville is an unincorporated community in eastern Colorado County, in the U.S. state of Texas. According to the Handbook of Texas, the community had a population of 50 in 2000.

== History ==
The hamlet is the result of a land-development initiative that was started in 1894 when Chicago land entrepreneur John Linderholm bought 60,000 acres (24,000 ha) in the region under the Southern Texas Colonization Company's name. William P. Chester, the surveyor of the area, is the source of the community's name. The process of colonization was successful. A post office was founded in 1895, and residents from several Midwest states moved to the area in collaboration with the railroad. Chesterville had about twenty businesses and numerous churches during its heyday, catering to a population of between 150 and 200 people. However, the land in the area was more suitable for large-scale stock-raising and rice cultivation than for small farms; as a result, Chesterville's population dropped to 25 by 1933 and to 75 by 1914. The post office for the village closed in 1950, and no population numbers were available for several years after 1966, when the reported population was still 25. There was just one company left by the middle of the 1980s to meet the demands of the big rice farms in the region. Still, 50 people were living there in 2000.

== Geography ==
Chesterville is located at the point where Farm to Market Road 1093 crossed the Wharton County line, 8 mi (13 km) east of Eagle Lake towards Wallis in southeastern Colorado County.

== Education ==
Chesterville once had its own school. Today, the community is served by the Rice Consolidated Independent School District.

== See also ==
- Farm to Market Road 2764

== Gallery ==
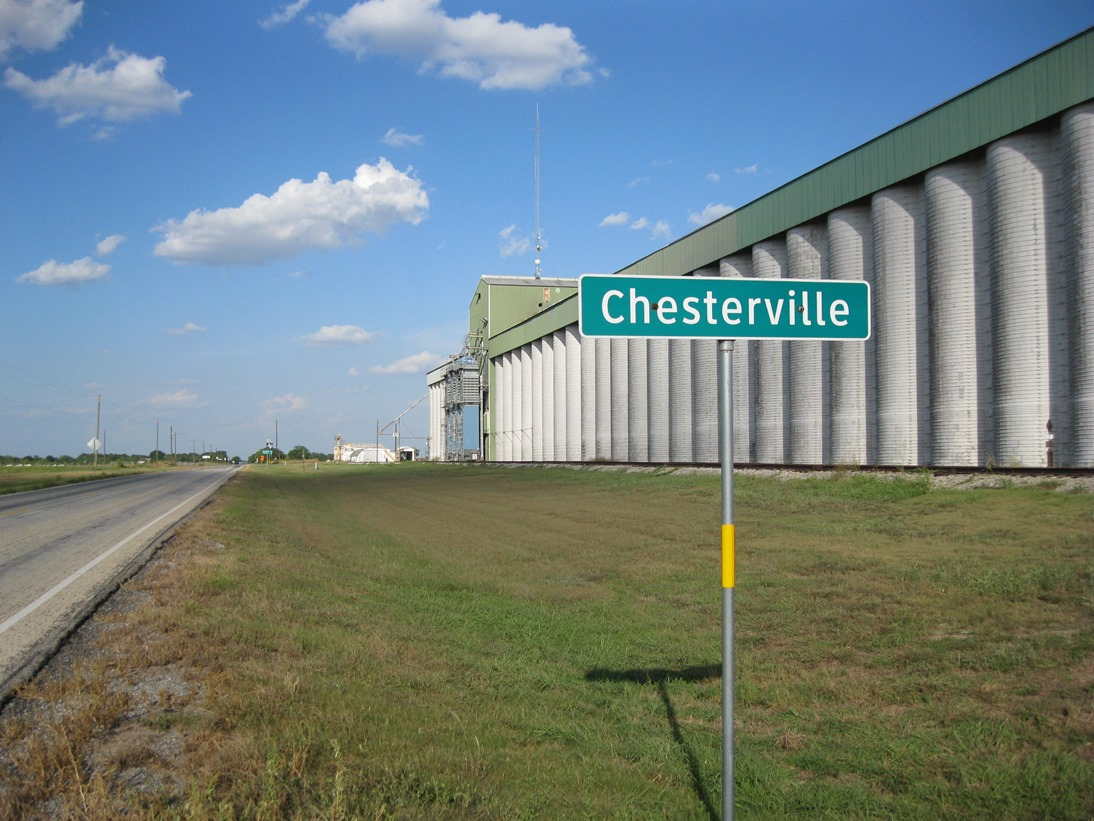
Sign on FM 1093 with grain elevator as backdrop

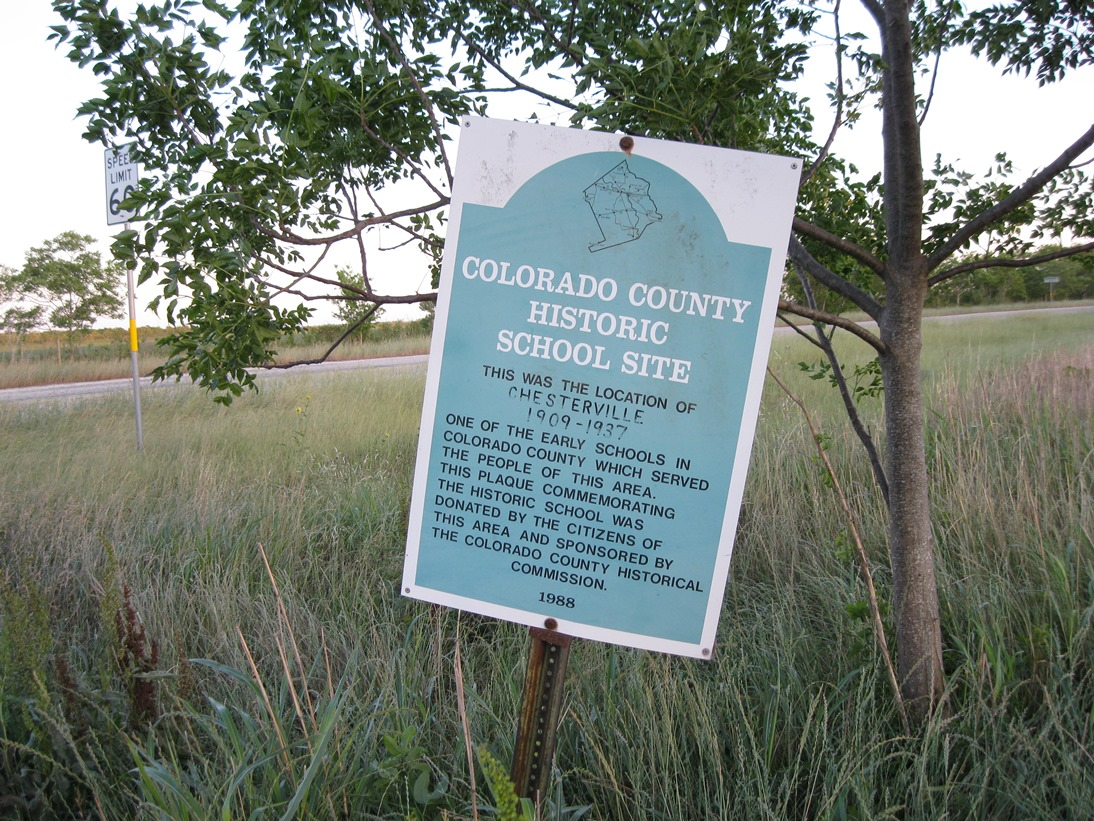
Historical marker commemorating 1909-1937 school

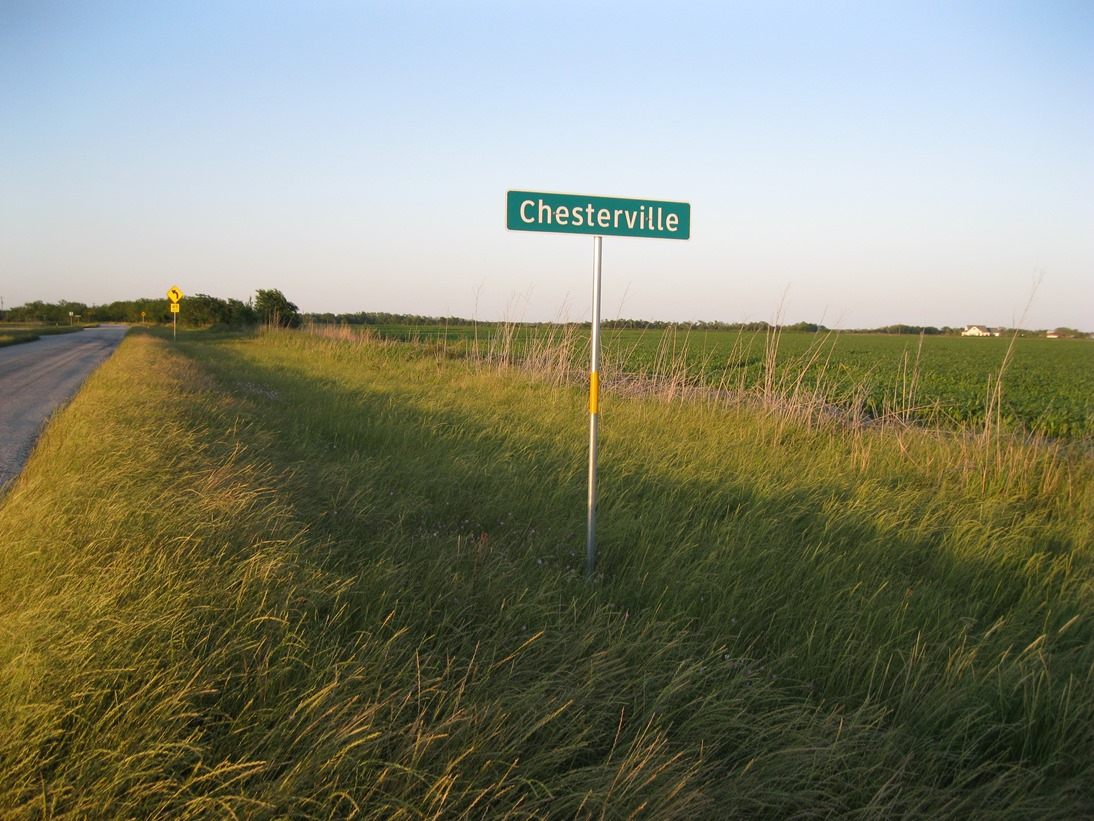
Sign on FM 2764 looking northeast across fields
