= Provident City, Texas =

- Ghost town
- Location within the state of Texas
- Coordinates: 29°16′58″N 96°37′56″W
- Country: United States
- State: Texas
- County: Colorado
- Elevation: 141 ft (43 m)
- Time zone: UTC-6 (Central (CST))
  - Summer (DST): UTC-5 (CDT)
- ZIP code: 77455
- Area code: 979
- GNIS feature ID: 1380402

Provident City is a ghost town in the far southern panhandle of Colorado County in the U.S. state of Texas. The former settlement is located along County Road 190. The town was first settled through a land promotion scheme in 1909 and enjoyed a brief heyday. When the hoped-for railroad obviously would never come to town, people began moving away. The post office closed in 1953, and most of the land was bought up for ranching. The town no longer exists, though the original hotel survives in private hands. Reaching the site requires driving 4.3 miles (6.9 km) on a gravel road from the nearest highway.

== Geography ==
The Geographic Names Information System locates Provident City at 29°16′58″N 96°37′56″W which is near the intersection of County Roads 190 and 248 in Colorado County. The former town is 26.0 miles (41.8 km) southeast of Hallettsville in Lavaca County via FM 530 and County Road 17. After County Road 17 crosses into Colorado County, it becomes County Road 190 and intersects with County Road 248 within a short distance.

== History ==
In 1909, the Provident Land Company of Kansas City began heavily promoting land between Goldenrod Creek and Sandy Creek in Colorado County. As many as 500 families from the American Midwest bought 5- to ten-acre plots, sight unseen. The company built hotels in Ganado and in Provident City to accommodate people interested in buying land in the area. By 1910, the town boasted banks, a broom factory, a cannery, churches, a drugstore, general and grocery stores, a jewelry store, restaurants, a school, and an undertaker. That year, a post office opened. The sandy local soil proved to be ideal for growing melons, cucumbers, and other vegetables. The town counted 150 residents in 1914. By that year, a promised railroad connection clearly would not materialize in the isolated place. During World War I, people began to move to urban centers in search of higher wages. During the Great Depression, many area farms were abandoned and lost through nonpayment of taxes. By 1949, the population had sunk to 30 persons and the post office closed in 1953. Hancock Oil bought most of the property and converted it to ranching operations. By 1986, only the old hotel remained. One source lists Provident City among Texas ghost towns.

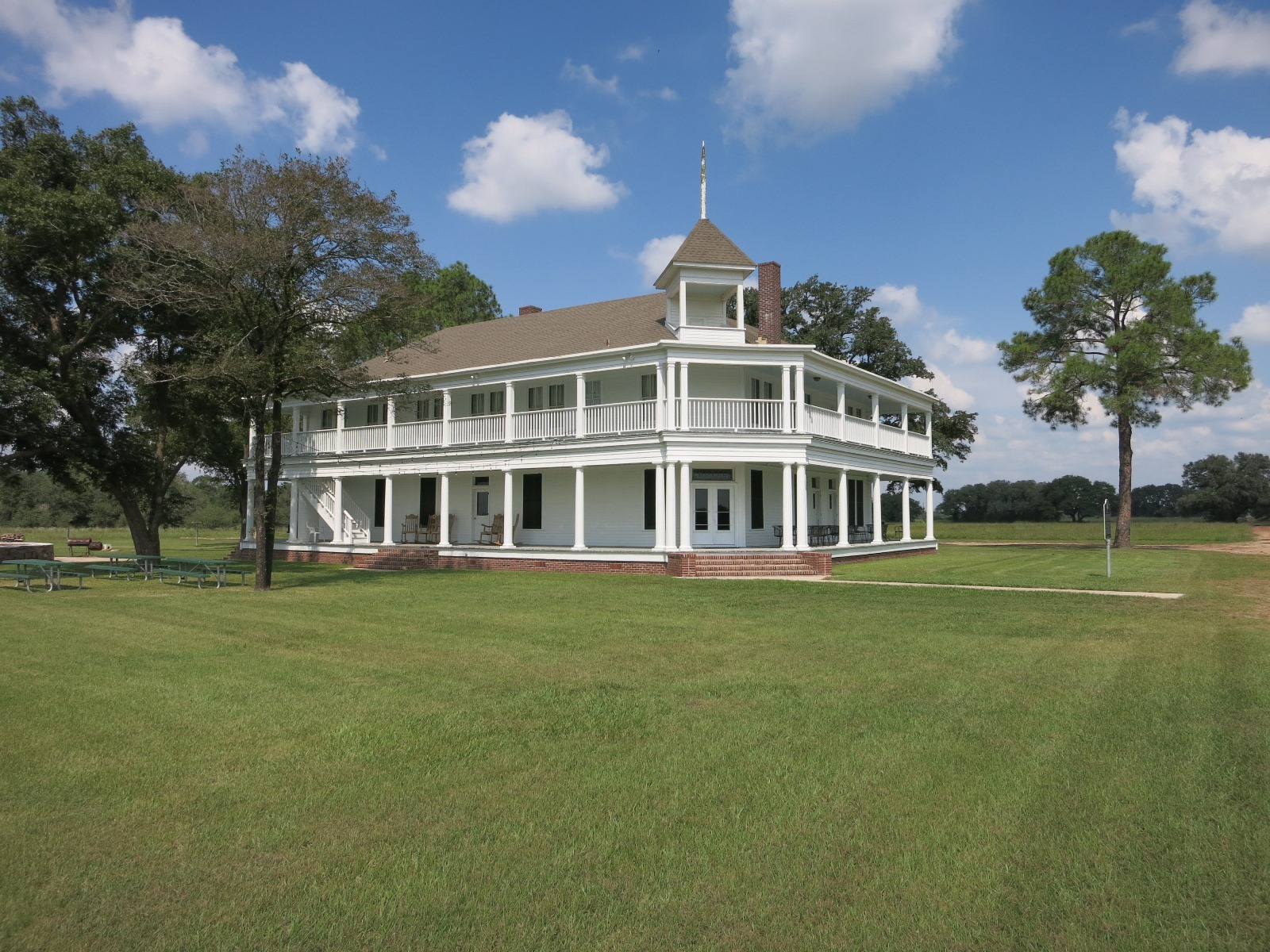
The former Provident City hotel is now in private ownership.

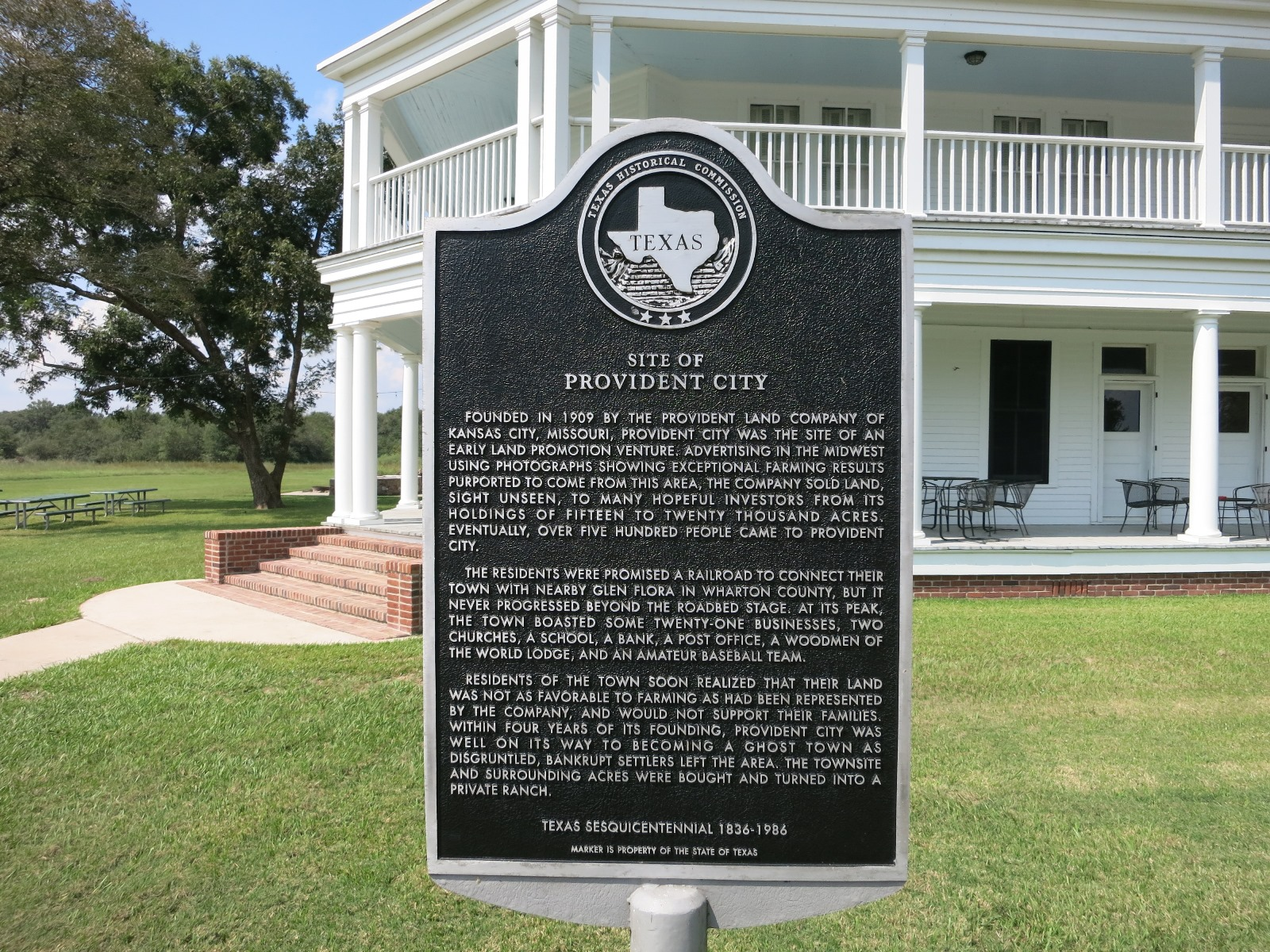
The Texas Historical Commission placed a marker in front of the former hotel.

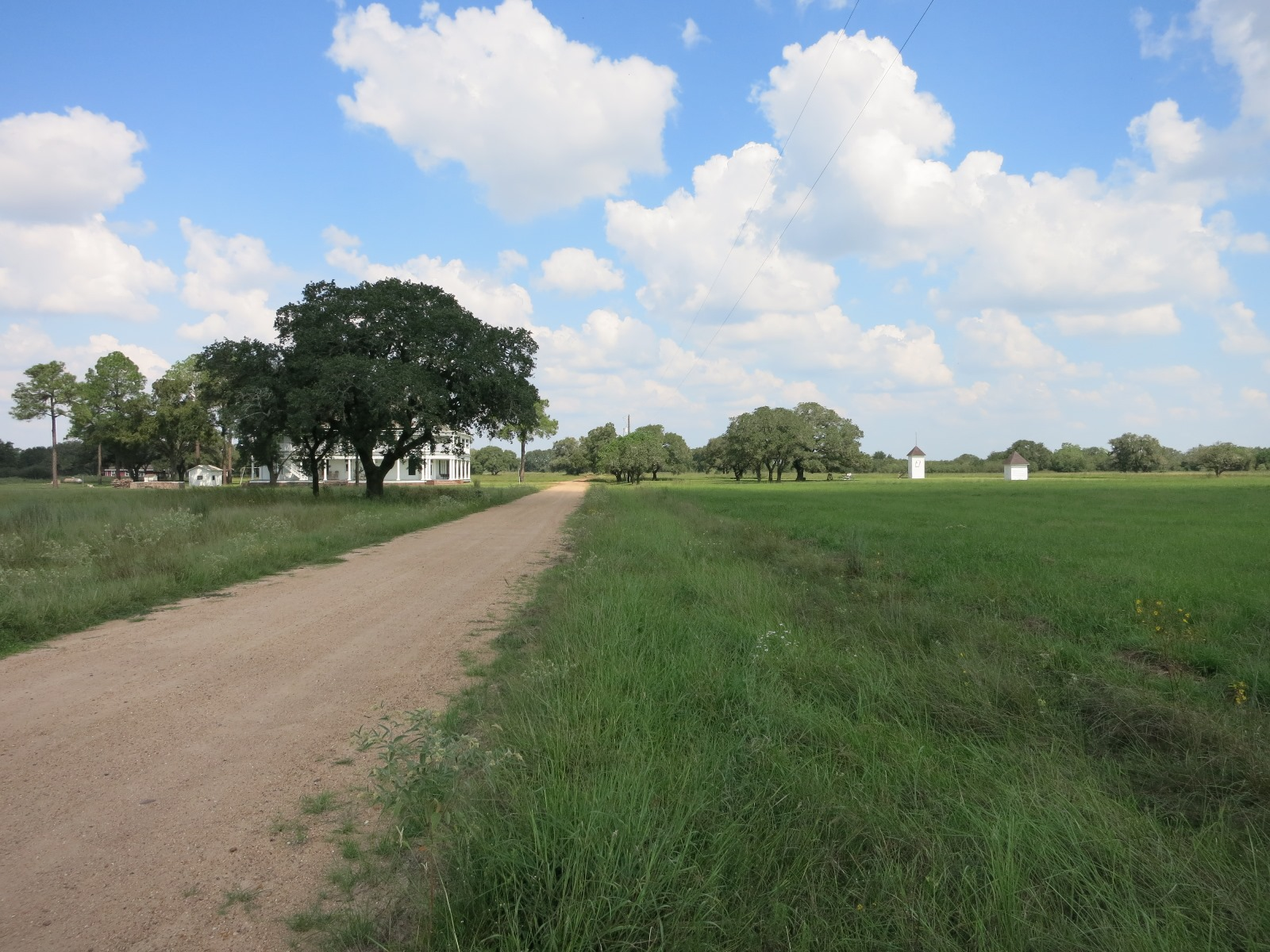
A north-looking view of the area shows the old hotel behind the oak tree at left.

== See also ==
- Danish Heritage Preservation Society
- "Halloween party at the former Provident City hotel". vimeo.com.
