= Lone Oak, Colorado County, Texas =

- Unincorporated community
- Location within Texas Location within the United States
- Coordinates: 29°54′6″N 96°34′55″W
- Country: United States
- State: Texas
- County: Colorado
- Elevation: 364 ft (111 m)
- Time zone: UTC-6 (Central (CST))
  - Summer (DST): UTC-5 (CDT)
- Area code: 979
- GNIS feature ID: 1380105

Lone Oak is an unincorporated community in Colorado County, Texas, United States. According to the Handbook of Texas, the community had a population of 50 in 2000.

== Education ==
Today, Lone Oak is served by the Columbus Independent School District.
