= MINC (disambiguation) =

Minc, MINC, or MinC may refer to:

- MINC, a data specification language.
- MinC, one of three proteins encoded by the minB operon
- Minc (surname)
- Ministério da Cultura (MinC), Brazil's Culture of Ministry
- MINC-11 computer, a PDP-11/03 or PDP-11/23 computer for laboratory applications
