= Colorado County, Texas =

County in Texas, United States

- County
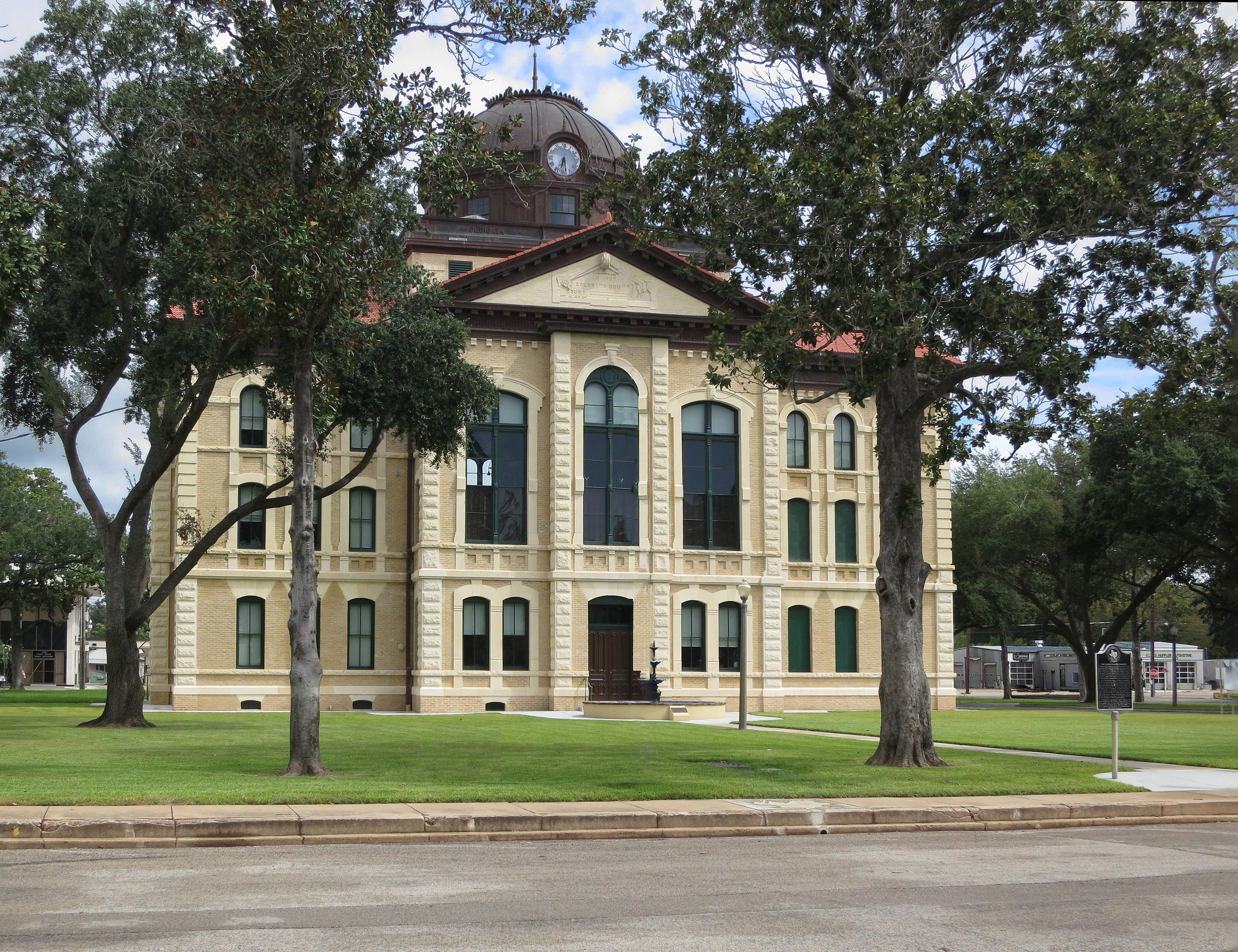
- Colorado County Courthouse in Columbus. Built 1890-1891: this 2014 photo shows restoration to original color scheme made in 2013

- Location within the U.S. state of Texas
- Coordinates: 29°37′N 96°31′W
- Country: United States
- State: Texas
- Founded: 1837
- Named for: Colorado River
- Seat: Columbus
- Largest city: Columbus

Area
  - Total: 974 sq mi (2,520 km^{2})
  - Land: 960 sq mi (2,500 km^{2})
  - Water: 13 sq mi (34 km^{2}) 1.4%

Population (2020)
  - Total: 20,557
  - Estimate (2025): 21,439 ▲
  - Density: 21/sq mi (8.3/km^{2})
- Time zone: UTC−6 (Central)
  - Summer (DST): UTC−5 (CDT)
- Congressional district: 10th
- Website: www.co.colorado.tx.us

Colorado County is a county located in the U.S. state of Texas. As of the 2020 census, its population was 20,557. Its county seat is Columbus. It is named for the Colorado River of Texas. The county was founded in 1836 and organized the next year.

== History ==
The territory that is now Colorado County has been continually inhabited by humans for at least 12,000 years. The Coco branch of the Karaknawa are said to have hunted in the area, while Tonkawa crossed the area from the south.

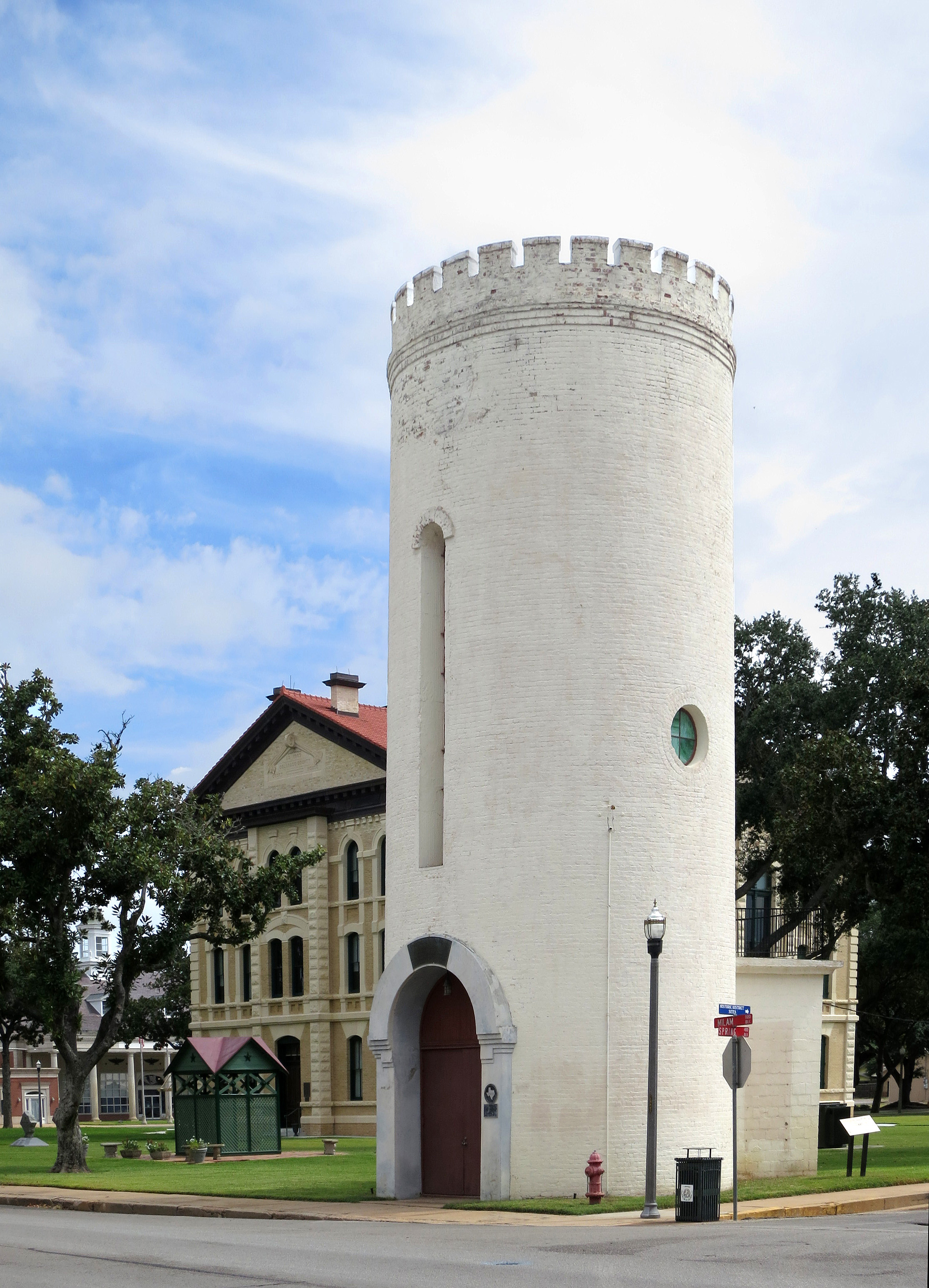
Confederate Memorial Museum, Colorado County, Texas

The first record of a European coming through the area that is now Colorado County was January 20, 1687, when René Robert Cavelier, Sieur de La Salle, camped along Skull Creek. The party located an Indian village and named it Hebemes. The fourth expedition of Alonso De León may have crossed into the area while looking for Fort St. Louis in 1689.

The area was settled by Anglo colonists who were part of Stephen F. Austin's Old Three Hundred starting in 1821. Some families settled near Beeson's Ford, a few miles south of Columbus' present day location. The area was active during the days of the Texas Revolution. Dilue Rose Harris wrote her memoir of the Runaway Scrape from within the boundaries of Colorado County.

The county was one of the original Republic of Texas counties when it formed in 1836. Following the American Civil War, the county had one of the larger populations of African-American freedmen in the state, and was granted a Freedmen's Bureau office in Columbus.

Many European settlers, particularly Germans, as well as Moravians and Bohemians from what became Czechoslovakia, began to settle in the county after the Civil War, although Germans had settled in the area as early as 1830.

== Geography ==
According to the U.S. Census Bureau, the county has a total area of 974 sq mi (2,520 km^{2}), of which 13 sq mi (34 km^{2}) (1.4%) are covered by water.

=== Major highways ===
- Interstate 10
- U.S. Highway 90
- U.S. Highway 90 Alternate
- State Highway 71
- Spur 52

=== Adjacent counties ===
- Austin County (northeast)
- Wharton County (southeast)
- Jackson County (south)
- Lavaca County (southwest)
- Fayette County (northwest)

=== National protected area ===
- Attwater Prairie Chicken National Wildlife Refuge

== Demographics ==
Historical population
Census	Pop.	Note	%±
1850	2,257		—
1860	7,885		249.4%
1870	8,326		5.6%
1880	16,673		100.3%
1890	19,512		17.0%
1900	22,203		13.8%
1910	18,897		−14.9%
1920	19,013		0.6%
1930	19,129		0.6%
1940	17,812		−6.9%
1950	17,576		−1.3%
1960	18,463		5.0%
1970	17,638		−4.5%
1980	18,823		6.7%
1990	18,383		−2.3%
2000	20,390		10.9%
2010	20,874		2.4%
2020	20,557		−1.5%
2025 (est.)	21,439	▲	4.3%
U.S. Decennial Census; 1850–2010 2010 2020

=== Racial and ethnic composition ===
Colorado County, Texas – Racial and ethnic composition Note: the US Census treats Hispanic/Latino as an ethnic category. This table excludes Latinos from the racial categories and assigns them to a separate category. Hispanics/Latinos may be of any race.
Race / Ethnicity (NH = Non-Hispanic)	Pop 1980	Pop 1990	Pop 2000	Pop 2010	Pop 2020	% 1980	% 1990	% 2000	% 2010	% 2020
White alone (NH)	12,722	12,437	13,165	12,496	11,761	67.59%	67.65%	64.57%	59.86%	57.21%
Black or African American alone (NH)	3,395	3,060	2,962	2,636	2,222	18.04%	16.65%	14.53%	12.63%	10.81%
Native American or Alaska Native alone (NH)	21	26	40	24	13	0.11%	0.14%	0.20%	0.11%	0.06%
Asian alone (NH)	18	13	42	75	80	0.10%	0.07%	0.21%	0.36%	0.39%
Native Hawaiian or Pacific Islander alone (NH)	x	x	3	15	0	x	x	0.01%	0.07%	0.00%
Other race alone (NH)	11	14	0	25	41	0.06%	0.08%	0.00%	0.12%	0.20%
Mixed race or Multiracial (NH)	x	x	154	151	450	x	x	0.76%	0.72%	2.19%
Hispanic or Latino (any race)	2,656	2,833	4,024	5,452	5,990	14.11%	15.41%	19.74%	26.12%	29.14%
Total	18,823	18,383	20,390	20,874	20,557	100.00%	100.00%	100.00%	100.00%	100.00%

=== 2020 census ===
As of the 2020 census, the county had a population of 20,557. The median age was 45.6 years, with 21.7% of residents under 18 and 24.2% were 65 or older. For every 100 females, there were 99.0 males, and for every 100 females 18 and over there were 96.4 males.

The racial makeup of the county was 64.1% White, 11.4% Black or African American, 0.5% American Indian and Alaska Native, 0.4% Asian, <0.1% Native Hawaiian and Pacific Islander, 12.4% from some other race, and 11.2% from two or more races. Hispanic or Latino residents of any race comprised 29.1% of the population.

About 0.1% of residents lived in urban areas, while about 100.0% lived in rural areas.

Of the 8,138 households in the county, 28.4% had children under 18 living in them, 53.4% were married-couple households, 18.3% were households with a male householder and no spouse or partner present, and 24.1% were households with a female householder and no spouse or partner present. About 26.6% of all households were made up of individuals and 14.4% had someone living alone who was 65 or older.

About 18.6% of the 9,992 housing units were vacant. Among occupied housing units, 77.8% were owner-occupied and 22.2% were renter-occupied. The homeowner vacancy rate was 1.9% and the rental vacancy rate was 9.0%.

=== 2000 census ===
As of the 2000 census, 20,390 people, 7,641 households, and 5,402 families were residing in the county. The population density was 21 people/mi^{2} (8.1 people/km^{2}). The 9,431 housing units averaged 10 per square mile (3.9/km^{2}). The racial makeup of the county was 72.79% White, 14.80% African American, 0.37% Native American, 0.21% Asian, 10.06% from other races, and 1.78% from two or more races. About 19.74% of the population were Hispanics or Latinos of any race.

Of the 7,641 households, 31.1% had children under 18 living with them, 56.3% were married couples living together, 10.9% had a female householder with no husband present, and 29.3% were not families. About 26.2% of all households were made up of individuals, and 14.4% had someone living alone who was 65 or older. The average household size was 2.56, and the average family size was 3.08.

In the county, the age distribution was 25.6% under 18, 8.9% from 18 to 24, 23.8% from 25 to 44, 23.1% from 45 to 64, and 18.60% who were 65 or older. The median age was 39 years. For every 100 females, there were 95.30 males. For every 100 females 18 and over, there were 92.40 males.

The median income for a household in the county was $32,425 and for a family was $41,388. Males had a median income of $30,063 versus $20,014 for females. The per capita income for the county was $16,910. About 12.3% of families and 16.2% of the population were below the poverty line, including 21.0% of those under 18 and 15.80% of those 65 or over.

== Communities ==
=== Cities ===
- Columbus (county seat)
- Eagle Lake
- Weimar

=== Census-designated place ===
- Garwood
- Glidden
- Nada
- Rock Island
- Sheridan

=== Unincorporated communities ===
- Alleyton
- Altair
- Bernardo
- Borden
- Chesterville
- Eldridge
- Frelsburg
- Hillcrest
- Lone Oak
- Mentz
- Oakland
- Shaws Bend

=== Ghost towns ===
- Matthews
- Osage
- Pisek
- Provident City

== Politics ==
Like many southern counties, Colorado County was predominantly Democratic prior to the 1960s and predominantly Republican since then. The last Democrat to carry the state was Jimmy Carter in 1976; George W. Bush, Mitt Romney, and Donald Trump all received more than 70% of the vote in the county.

United States presidential election results for Colorado County, Texas
Year	Republican		Democratic		Third party(ies)	
Year	No.	%	No.	%	No.	%
1912	106	7.24%	1,204	82.18%	155	10.58%
1916	358	24.17%	1,041	70.29%	82	5.54%
1920	477	19.27%	765	30.91%	1,233	49.82%
1924	681	21.54%	2,105	66.57%	376	11.89%
1928	891	33.22%	1,787	66.63%	4	0.15%
1932	331	10.79%	2,715	88.47%	23	0.75%
1936	372	20.50%	1,435	79.06%	8	0.44%
1940	1,166	41.00%	1,674	58.86%	4	0.14%
1944	638	20.59%	1,517	48.97%	943	30.44%
1948	900	28.53%	1,316	41.71%	939	29.76%
1952	3,237	61.19%	2,043	38.62%	10	0.19%
1956	2,691	61.62%	1,648	37.74%	28	0.64%
1960	1,909	44.95%	2,299	54.13%	39	0.92%
1964	1,918	34.41%	3,650	65.48%	6	0.11%
1968	2,296	42.22%	1,976	36.34%	1,166	21.44%
1972	3,495	69.66%	1,502	29.94%	20	0.40%
1976	2,991	49.23%	3,028	49.84%	56	0.92%
1980	3,520	58.75%	2,377	39.68%	94	1.57%
1984	4,528	64.95%	2,428	34.83%	15	0.22%
1988	3,723	56.41%	2,847	43.14%	30	0.45%
1992	3,286	45.88%	2,442	34.10%	1,434	20.02%
1996	3,381	49.90%	2,795	41.25%	599	8.84%
2000	4,913	67.77%	2,229	30.75%	107	1.48%
2004	5,488	71.37%	2,161	28.10%	41	0.53%
2008	5,795	69.38%	2,508	30.03%	50	0.60%
2012	6,026	74.24%	2,029	25.00%	62	0.76%
2016	6,325	74.30%	1,987	23.34%	201	2.36%
2020	7,472	74.91%	2,420	24.26%	83	0.83%
2024	7,824	78.29%	2,108	21.09%	62	0.62%

United States Senate election results for Colorado County, Texas1
Year	Republican		Democratic		Third party(ies)	
Year	No.	%	No.	%	No.	%
2024	7,554	76.16%	2,207	22.25%	158	1.59%

United States Senate election results for Colorado County, Texas2
Year	Republican		Democratic		Third party(ies)	
Year	No.	%	No.	%	No.	%
2020	7,367	74.49%	2,362	23.88%	161	1.63%

Texas Gubernatorial election results for Colorado County
Year	Republican		Democratic		Third party(ies)	
Year	No.	%	No.	%	No.	%
2022	6,084	80.63%	1,395	18.49%	67	0.89%

== Education ==
School districts include:

- Columbus Independent School District
- Hallettsville Independent School District
- Rice Consolidated Independent School District
- Weimar Independent School District

The Texas Legislature assigns areas in Columbus, Rice Consolidated, and Weimar ISDs to Wharton County Junior College. The legislation does not state where Hallettsville ISD areas are assigned.

== See also ==
- List of museums in East Texas
- National Register of Historic Places listings in Colorado County, Texas
- Recorded Texas Historic Landmarks in Colorado County
