= Mintz =

Mintz is a Jewish (Ashkenazic) surname of German origin. Its etymology may be connected to the German city of Mainz. Other spelling variants are Mints, Minc, Minz and Münz.

Notable people with the surname include:

- Beatrice Mintz (1921–2022), American embryologist
- Binyamin Mintz (1903–1961), Israeli politician
- Charles Mintz (1896–1940), American film producer and distributor
- Dan Mintz (born 1981), American actor and comedian
- Dan Mintz (executive) (born 1965), American filmmaker, producer and businessman
- David Mintz (disambiguation), multiple people
- Elliot Mintz (born 1945), American broadcast personality and publicist
- Herman Mintz of Mintz, Levin, Cohn, Ferris, Glovsky, and Popeo, American attorney firm
- Grafton K. Mintz (1925–1983), American writer and translator
- Jordan Mintz, former vice president and General Counsel for Corporate Development at Enron Corporation
- Joshua Mintz (born 1965), Mexican television executive
- Morton Mintz (1922–2025), American investigative journalist
- Noah Mintz (born 1970), Canadian musician
- Sam Mintz (1897–1957), American screenwriter
- Shlomo Mintz (born 1957), Israeli violin virtuoso, violist and conductor
- Sidney Mintz (1922–2015), American anthropologist

== Compound surnames ==
- Tanhum Cohen-Mintz (1939–2014), Latvian-born Israeli basketball player
- Uri Cohen-Mintz (born 1973), Israeli basketball player
- Christopher Mintz-Plasse (born 1989), American actor, comedian and musician

== See also ==
- Mentz
- Minc / Mints / Minz
- Munz / Muntz
