= Muntz =

Muntz or Müntz is a surname. Notable people with the surname include:

== Muntz ==
- George Frederic Muntz (1794–1857), industrialist and MP from Birmingham, England
  - Muntz metal, an alloy which he invented
  - Philip Henry Muntz, his brother, also an MP
  - Sir Philip Muntz, 1st Baronet, his son
    - See also Muntz Baronets
- H. M. Muntz (1800s), musician and collector from Birmingham, England
  - Muntz Stradivarius, an antique violin
- Alan Muntz (1899–1985), British consulting aeronautical engineer
- Earl "Madman" Muntz (1914–1987), American merchandiser of cars and consumer electronics, electrical engineer
  - Muntz Car Company
  - Muntz Stereo-Pak, in magnetic tape sound recording
  - Muntzing, removing excess components of an electronic appliance
- Laura Muntz Lyall (1860–1930), Canadian impressionist painter
- Rob Muntz (born 1963), Dutch comedian
- Rolf Muntz (born 1969), Dutch golfer

=== Fictional characters ===
- Nelson Muntz, on The Simpsons
- Charles Muntz, main antagonist of Up

== Müntz ==
- Eugène Müntz (1845–1902), Alsace-born art historian
- Herman Müntz (1884–1956), Polish-Jewish mathematician
  - Müntz–Szász theorem

== See also ==
- Munz (disambiguation)
- Mintz
- Minz
