= Mentzer =

Mentzer is a surname. Notable people with the surname include:

- Denise Mentzer, American politician from Michigan
- Ethan Mentzer, member of The Click Five
- Frank Mentzer, American fantasy author
- John Thomas Mentzer, American marketing professor
- Mike Mentzer, American bodybuilder
- Ray Mentzer, American bodybuilder, brother of Mike
- Steven Mentzer, American politician in Pennsylvania
- Susanne Mentzer, operatic mezzo-soprano
- William C. Mentzer, aeronautical engineer

== See also ==
- Mentzer Building
- Mentzer index
- Mentzen (surname)
