= Minc (surname) =

Minc is a surname, variant of Mintz. Notable people with the surname include:

- Alain Minc (1949–), French businessman, political advisor, and author
- Carlos Minc (1951–), Brazilian geographer and politician
- Henryk Minc (1919–2013), Polish-American mathematician
- Hilary Minc (1905–1974), Polish economist and member of Communist Party of Poland

== See also ==
- Mints
- Mintz
