= Pisek, Texas =

- Ghost town
- Location within the state of Texas Pisek (the United States)
- Coordinates: 29°55′00″N 96°34′59″W
- Country: United States
- State: Texas
- County: Colorado
- Elevation: 291 ft (89 m)
- Time zone: UTC-6 (Central (CST))
  - Summer (DST): UTC-5 (CDT)
- ZIP code: 77950
- Area code: 979

Pisek (or Lone Oak, Sandy Point, or Nickols) is a ghost town in northern Colorado County, in the U.S. state of Texas. The former settlement, now a ghost town, was abandoned after 1941 when the inhabitants moved to Lone Oak on Farm to Market Road 1291. The site of Pisek is on a railroad between Fayetteville in Fayette County and New Ulm in Austin County.

== Geography ==
Pisek was situated in extreme northern Colorado County near where the BNSF Railway crosses Fischer-Buller Road. Boggy Creek runs to the northwest through the site before turning southwest and emptying into Cummins Creek. Area roads include Lutonsky Lane, Buxkemper Road, 10th Street and Stokes Road to the northeast and Schmidt and Kickler Roads to the south. The junction of FM 1291 and Fischer-Buller Road is 1.1 miles (1.8 km) south of the railroad crossing. New Ulm is 7.7 miles (12.4 km) east of the junction of FM 1291 and Fischer-Buller Road, while Fayetteville is 5.8 miles (9.3 km) west of the same place.

== History ==
The community called Pisek existed in the 1880s and boasted two commercial establishments. It was located where Lone Oak now exists, along FM 1291 roughly 3 miles (4.8 km) in each direction from the Fayette and Austin County lines. In 1887, when the Missouri, Kansas and Texas Railway completed its line to Boggy Tank and built a turntable at the site, the mostly Czech and German inhabitants of Pisek moved there. The railroad tried to name the new town Sandy Point, but eventually the name Pisek was adopted (after the Czech town of Písek). Between 1896 and 1907 the community had a post office. During that period the settlement also had a saloon, cottonseed warehouse, and a few stores. While the town was a railhead it prospered, but after the railroad was completed to Houston, the residents began to move back to the original location. In 1941 the last store closed and moved away. The railroad renamed the site Nickols. The new community of Lone Oak was named for a single oak tree that stood near an important intersection. Its population was 50 in 2000.

About 3 miles (4.8 km) to the east, there is a state historical marker that commemorates Mary Theresa Hennecke Juergens. Mary and her husband Conrad came to Texas in 1833 and built a cabin. As Mexican armies invaded Texas during the Texas Revolution, most of the settlers fled the area in the Runaway Scrape. The Juergens family decided to stay but the pregnant Mary and her two stepsons were kidnapped by a band of Karankawa Indians. Mary gave birth in captivity and she and her daughter Ann Margaret were later ransomed for $300 at a trading post on the Red River. The boys were never recovered and Conrad soon died. Mary remarried and lived near Frelsburg until 1871 when she moved to Ohio. She died there in 1891.

== See also ==
There is a 1940s era Colorado County map at the following link.

- "Texas Escapes: Chesterville, Texas". TexasEscapes.com - Blueprints for Travel, LLC. 2010.
