= David Mintz =

David Mintz may refer to:

- David B. Mintz (fl. 1805–1806), American Methodist minister
- David Hammerstein Mintz (born 1955), American-born Spanish politician
- David Mintz, New York restaurateur and founder of Tofutti Brands
- David Liebe Hart (born 1957, uses the name David Liebe Mintz), American outsider musician, street performer, artist, puppeteer and actor
- David Mintz (judge) (born 1959), judge of the Supreme Court of Israel
