= Mints (surname) =

Mints is a surname, variant of Mintz. Notable people with the surname include:

- Aleksandr Mints, Soviet radiophysicist and engineer
- Boris Mints, Russian business oligarch
- Grigori Mints (June 7, 1939 – May 29, 2014) was a Russian philosopher and mathematician
- Isaak Mints, Soviet historian
- Lloyd Mints (1888–1989), American economist
- Roman Mints, British violinist
- Zara Mints (1927–1990), Jewish Russian philologist
- Lev Mironovich Mints (1937–2011), Soviet and Russian ethnographer, teacher, journalist, and writer

== Fictional characters ==
- Lev Khristoforovich Mints from Veliky Guslyar

== See also ==
- Mintz
- Minc
