= Munz =

Munz may refer to:

== People ==
- Bernhard Münz (1856–1919), Austrian philosopher and librarian
- Peter Munz (1921–2006), German-New Zealander philosopher and historian
- Philip A. Munz (1892-1974), U.S. botanist, taxonomist and educator
- Mieczysław Munz (1900–1976), Polish-U.S. pianist
- Moses Münz (c. 1750–1831), Hungarian rabbi
- Volker Münz (born 1964), German politician (AfD)

== Other ==
- Maritime Union of New Zealand (MUNZ), a trade union in New Zealand
- Munz, a chocolate brand owned by Maestrani

== See also ==
- Muntz (disambiguation)
- Müntz (disambiguation)
- Minz
- Mintz
