= Osage, Colorado County, Texas =

Osage, Texas
- Ghost town
- Location within the state of Texas
- Coordinates: 29°44′28″N 96°42′54″W
- Country: United States
- State: Texas
- County: Colorado
- Elevation: 325 ft (99 m)
- Time zone: UTC-6 (Central (CST))
  - Summer (DST): UTC-5 (CDT)
- ZIP code: 78962
- Area code: 979
- GNIS feature ID: 1343321

Osage is a ghost town in northwestern Colorado County in the U.S. state of Texas. The one-time settlement was situated on Harvey Creek near the junction of County Roads 205 and 208 a few miles to the northeast of Weimar. At the time of the Civil War, the community was substantial enough to provide a company of soldiers to a Texas regiment in the Confederate States Army. A notable school flourished in Osage starting in the 1870s, but in that decade, the railroad was built through Weimar, instead. By 1900, the local commercial establishments had moved to Weimar and the town faded out of existence. In 2013, the area was sparsely settled.

== Geography ==
The Geographic Names Information System places the Osage Cemetery at 29°44′28″N 96°42′54″W which is near the intersection of County Roads 205 and 208 in Colorado County. This location is 6.2 miles (10.0 km) northeast of the center of Weimar via FM 155 and County Roads 202, 204, 201 and 208. The Colorado River flows a few miles to the north and east. The only other landmarks in the area are the Old Osage Cemetery, a few hundred yards to the northeast of the Osage Cemetery and the Adkins Cemetery, on County Road 201.

== History ==
The first Anglo-American settlers in the region were Tom Hubbard and his family, who came from Mississippi in 1851. They began farming along Harvey Creek, which formed part of a land grant to Henry Austin, cousin of Stephen F. Austin. A major influx of Scotch-Irish and English immigrants from Laurel, Mississippi, arrived in a 36-wagon caravan in 1855. After building homes and bringing in the first harvest the following year, their leader, Dr. Samuel D. McLeary, named the community Osage after the Osage orange trees found in the area. In the early part of the Civil War, Osage and other area communities supplied the men who formed Company A of the 5th Texas Cavalry Regiment. In 1862, the town boasted a blacksmith, cotton gin, a number of well-built homes, several stores, and a Confederate States of America post office. E. B. Carruth opened a school at Osage in 1874, and it soon became locally famous, drawing students from a 100-mile radius who boarded with area families. However, the Galveston, Harrisburg and San Antonio Railroad was built west from Columbus and the new town of Weimar was established on the railroad in 1873. Between that year and 1900, every business abandoned Osage and moved about 4 miles (6.4 km) southwest to Weimar. By the 1980s, only a few scattered farms and ranches remained in the area. One source dubs Osage a ghost town.
