= Minz =

Minz is a surname. Notable people with the surname include:

- Abraham ben Judah Minz (c. 1440–1520), Italian rabbi
- Judah ben Eliezer ha-Levi Minz (c. 1405–1508), Italian rabbi
- Moses ben Isaac ha-Levi Minz, German rabbi of the 16th century
- Moses Minz (c. 1750–1831), Hungarian rabbi

== See also ==
- Mintz
- Muntz
