= Mentz, Texas =

- Unincorporated community
- Location within the state of Texas Mentz (the United States)
- Coordinates: 29°45′01″N 96°26′13″W
- Country: United States
- State: Texas
- County: Colorado
- Elevation: 285 ft (87 m)
- Time zone: UTC-6 (Central (CST))
  - Summer (DST): UTC-5 (CDT)
- ZIP code: 78935
- Area code: 979
- GNIS feature ID: 1378665

Mentz is an unincorporated community in northeastern Colorado County, in the U.S. state of Texas. According to the Handbook of Texas, the community had a population of 100 in 2000.

== History ==
The majority of the community's settlers were German Catholics from Büdesheim, Hesse, who arrived around 1846. The Roman Catholic Diocese of Mainz produced a large number of the initial settlers. The settlement was first known as Neu Mainz by the Mainz Society, before changing to Mentz. In 1858, a tiny church was constructed by the settlers and given the name St. Roch after a chapel located near Büdesheim and Bingen. The post office serving the area was first founded in 1853 under the name San Bernard, changed to New Mainz in 1860, and closed in 1866. It was then reopened as Mentz in 1889, closed in 1896, reopened the following year, and moved to Alleyton in 1913. Mentz had the church building, a rectory, a cemetery, a church hall, and some picnic buildings in 1986. There was also a baseball park on the premises. Mentz had 167 registered voters in its precinct. The population was 100 in 2000.

On September 4, 2011, a fire blazed through Mentz. It consumed 1,800 acres (730 ha), 11 homes, 40 outbuildings, and about 38 vehicles. It was contained a few days later.

== Geography ==
Mentz is located at the intersection of Mentz and Frelsburg roads, approximately 7 miles (11 km) northeast of Columbus in Colorado County.

== Education ==
The Sisters of Divine Providence operated a Catholic School in the community from 1872 through 1916. Today, the community is served by the Columbus Independent School District.

== Gallery ==
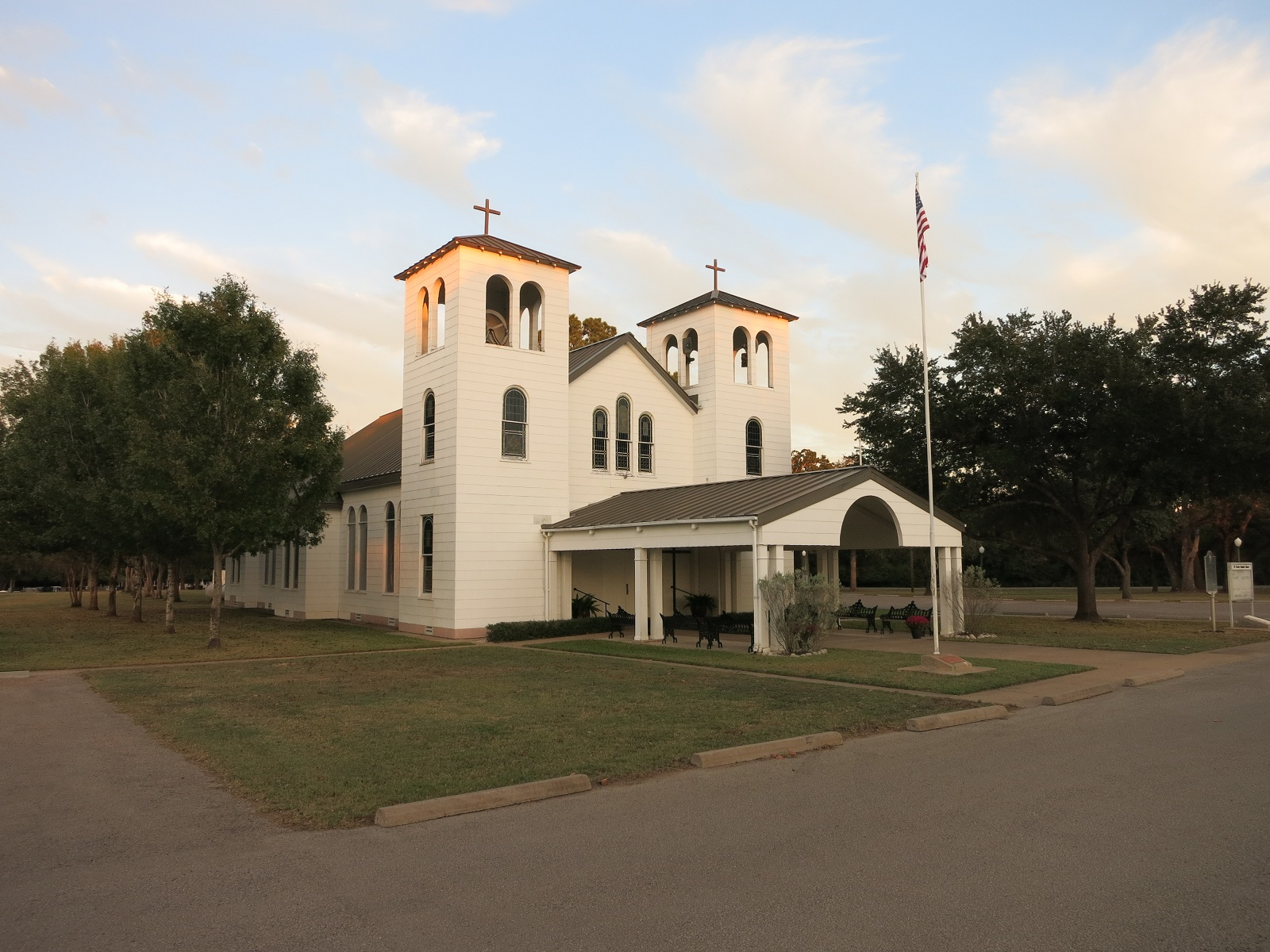
St. Roch Catholic Church is near the intersection of Frelsburg and Mentz Roads.

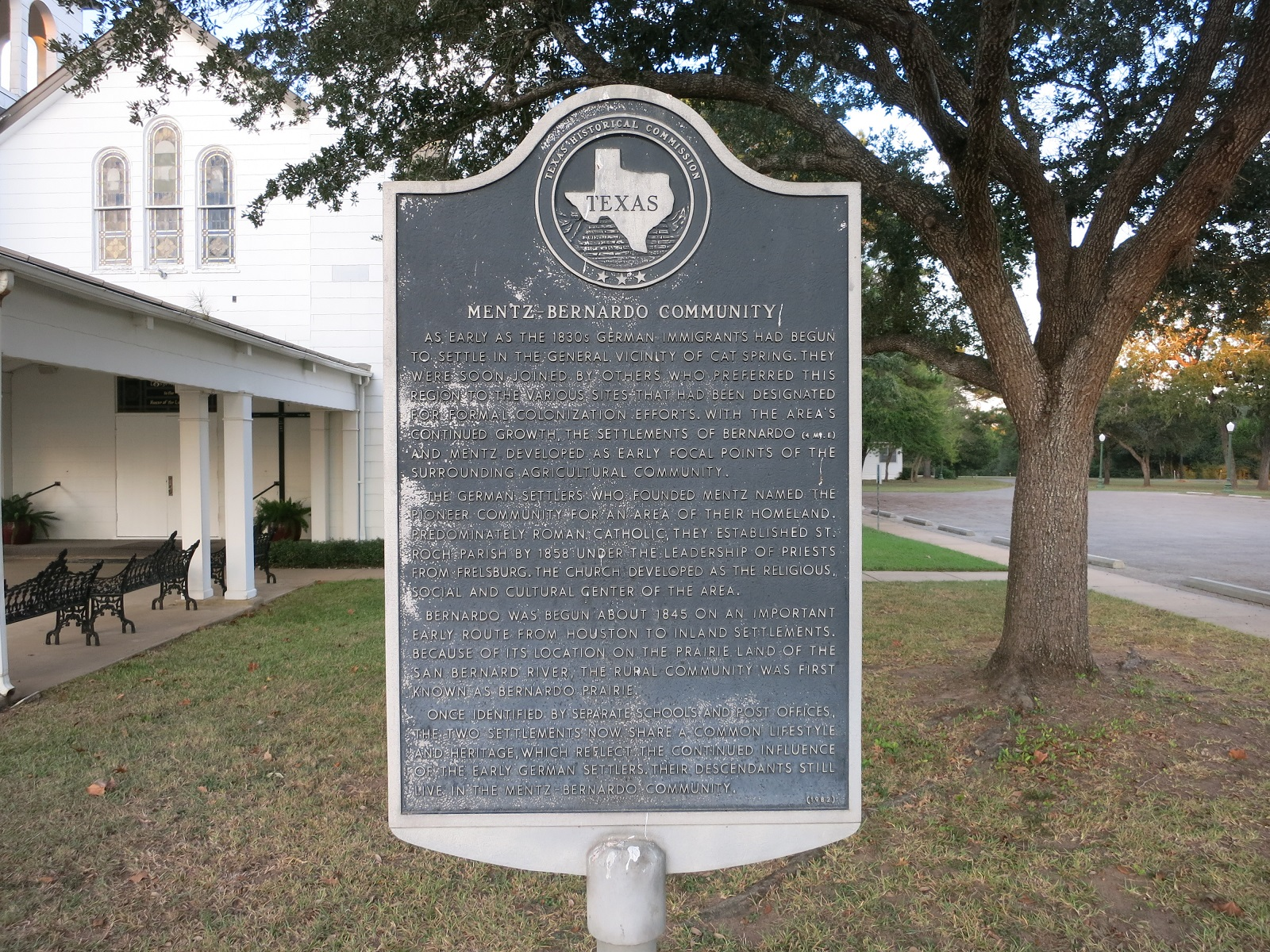
State historical marker describes the history of the Bernardo and Mentz communities.

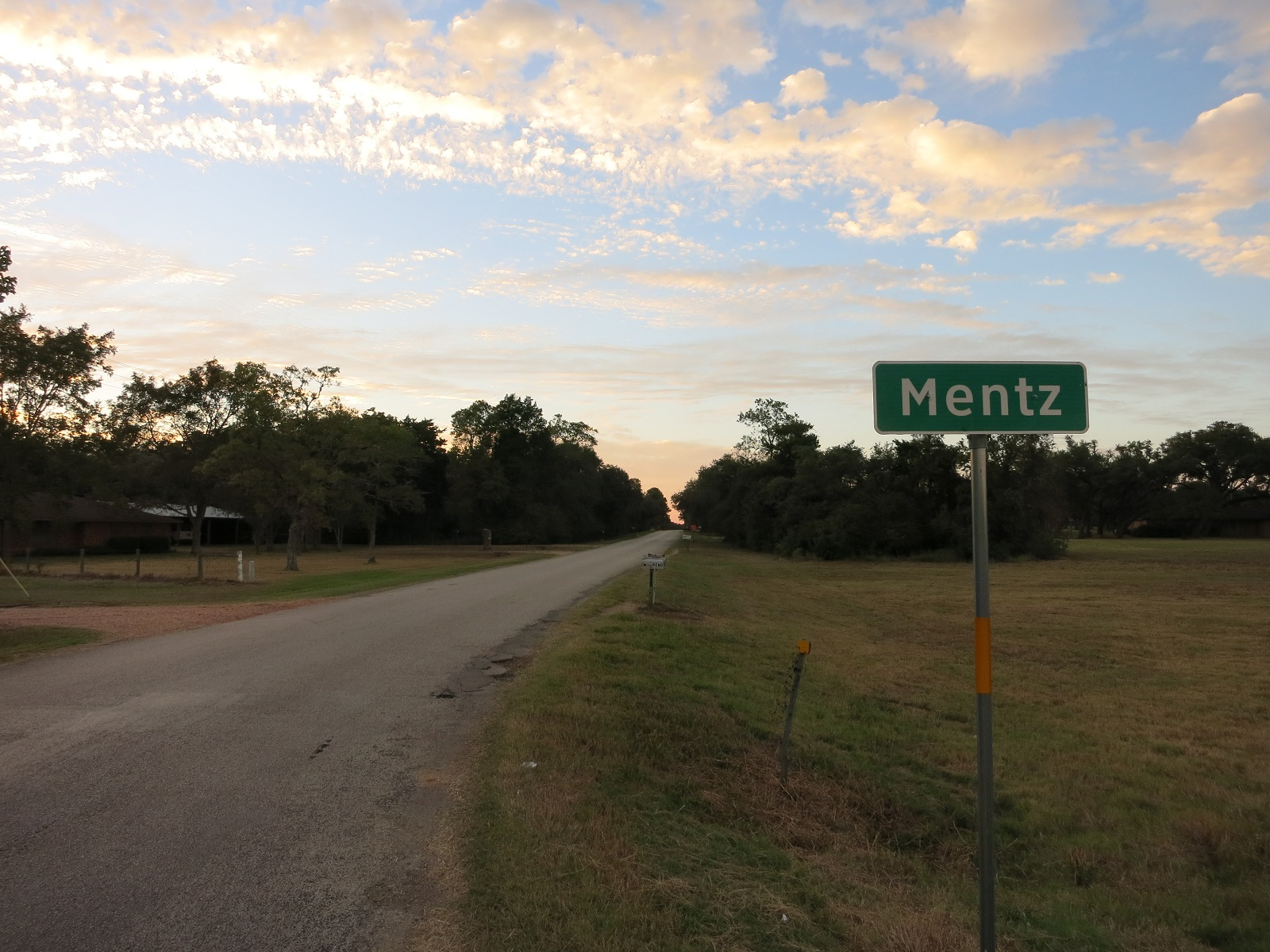
Mentz sign is at FM 949 and Frelsburg Road.
