= Hockley, Texas =

Unincorporated community in Harris County, Texas, United States

Coordinates: 30°01′37″N 95°50′40″W

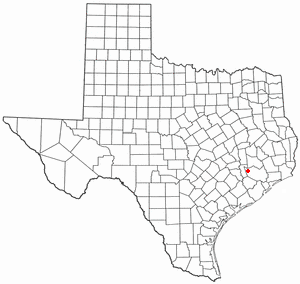
Location of Hockley, Texas

Hockley is an unincorporated community located in Harris County, Texas, United States, on Texas State Highway 6 and U.S. Route 290, about five miles (8.0 km) southeast of Waller and 36 mi (57.9 km) northwest of downtown Houston.

== Description ==
The community serves as the main hub for railway traffic serving Houston, Austin, and many parts of Central Texas. The Southern Pacific (now known as Union Pacific) rail line is one of the community's major employers. The community is surrounded by grain farms and cattle ranches. The ZIP Code for Hockley is 77447.

== History ==
George Washington Hockley established Hockley in 1835. In 1906, a salt dome was discovered near Hockley and mined, especially for salt.

== Economy ==
In September 2008, Hewlett-Packard (HP) acquired 97 acres (39 ha) of land near Hockley in a proposed 389-acre (157 ha) industrial park planned by John Beeson of Beeson Properties and Monzer Hourani of Medistar Corp. It paid an undisclosed sum to Beeson and Hourani, the land's previous owners. HP's proposed $250 million facility would be near the intersection of Betka Road and U.S. Highway 290, in close proximity to the Harris County-Waller County line, 18 miles (29 km) from HP's main greater Houston offices, and northwest of the city of Houston.

== Infrastructure and government ==
Hockley is located in Harris County Precinct 4; as of 2023, Lesley Briones serves as the commissioner of the precinct.

The United States Postal Service operates the Hockley Post Office at 17210 Warren Ranch Road.

== Parks and recreation ==
The county operates the Hockley Community Center at 28515 Old Washington Road. In 1982, the county bought 24 acres (97,000 m^{2}) of land for a maintenance center and a community center. Bob Eckels, then the commissioner of Precinct 3, got a grant from the U.S. Department of Housing and Urban Development. Hermes Reed Hindman – Architects, Inc. developed the building and AIA Engineers and Contractors, Inc. served as the contractor. Construction ended in 1986.

The county operates Hockley Park at 28515 Old Washington Road at the community center site.

== Education ==
Hockley is within the Waller Independent School District.

Schools serving Hockley include:

- Waller High School (unincorporated Harris County)
- Waller Junior High School (Waller) and Wayne C. Schultz Junior High (Unincorporated Harris County) are the two junior high schools of the district. They take sections of the surrounding area.
- Elementary schools with Hockley addresses (unincorporated areas) include Roberts Road Elementary School, and Evelyn Turlington Elementary School, and which each take portions of the area.

Portions of Harris County in Waller ISD are assigned to Blinn College. Blinn operates the Waller-Harris County Campus.

Rosehill Christian School now located in the Rose Hill area, was first founded in Hockley in 1989.

== Notable people ==
- Hockley was the home to eight-time world-champion calf roper Fred Whitfield for several years. He is the first African American to win the world championship and was also named the PRCA All-Around Champion in 1999. It is also the location of racing legend A. J. Foyt's ranch. Foyt is the first 4-time winner of the Indy 500 and a Daytona 500 champion. A. J. Foyt IV also calls Hockley home. A. J. Foyt the IV is a 6-time starter in the Indianapolis 500 and an NFL Scout for the Indianapolis Colts.
