= Shiloh, Waller County, Texas =

Unincorporated community in Texas, US

Shiloh is an unincorporated community in unincorporated northeastern Waller County, Texas, United States, approximately 1.5 miles (2.4 km) north of Prairie View along Farm to Market Road 1098. The community grew up around the Shiloh Baptist Church, which was established in 1871.

== Education ==
The settlement is within Waller Independent School District.

All of Waller County is in the service area of Blinn College.
