= Darrell Hawkins =

American basketball coach and player

Personal information
- Born: October 30, 1969 (age 57) Houston, Texas
- Listed height: 6 ft 5 in (1.96 m)

Career information
- High school: Waller (Waller, Texas)
- College: Arkansas (1988–1993)
- NBA draft: 1993: undrafted
- Position: Forward
- Coaching career: 2002–2006

Career history

Coaching
- 2002–2005: Prairie View A&M (assistant)
- 2005–2006: Prairie View A&M (interim)

Career highlights
- Third-team All-SEC (1993)

Darrell Hawkins (born October 30, 1969) is an American former professional basketball player and coach. He played college basketball for the Arkansas Razorbacks. Hawkins played professionally in the United States, Europe and China.

== Early life ==
Hawkins was born in Houston and raised in Prairie View, Texas. He attended Waller High School and earned all-state honors when he averaged 27.0 points and 15.0 rebounds per game during his senior season.

== Playing career ==
Hawkins played for the Arkansas Razorbacks from 1988 to 1993. He tore his Achilles tendon four games into the 1990–91 season and missed the rest of the season. On March 6, 1991, Hawkins was suspended by head coach Nolan Richardson for the first three games of the 1991–92 season when he had a woman in his athletic dorm. The incident had emerged when the woman made allegations of sexual assault against Hawkins and three other members of the Razorbacks basketball team, who were all suspended from the team for the season on April 11, 1991. The police investigation found no evidence that a crime had been committed and charges were not filed so the suspensions were lifted in November 1991.

Hawkins returned as the Razorbacks' sixth man during his junior season and averaged 6.7 points per game. He was named as a team captain during his senior season and averaged 13.3 points as he was named to the third-team all-Southeastern Conference (SEC). Hawkins shares the NCAA Division I men's basketball tournament single-game record for most steals with eight in a 1993 game against the Holy Cross Crusaders. (Note: The record is shared with Grant Hill of the Duke Blue Devils (1993) and Duane Clemens of the Ball State Cardinals (2000).)

During his time with the Razorbacks, Hawkins helped Arkansas win several titles, to include three consecutive Southwest Conference (SWC) regular season championships in 1989, 1990, and 1991, as well as three consecutive SWC tournament championships during that time. Arkansas moved to the Southeastern Conference (SEC) beginning in the 1991-92 school year, and Hawkins helped the Hogs win the SEC Western Division championship in 1992 and 1993, plus the SEC regular season title in 1992. Arkansas played in the NCAA Tournament every year Hawkins was in Fayetteville. The Razorbacks advanced to the 2nd Round in 1989, made it to the 1990 Final Four after winning the Midwest Regional championship, the Elite Eight in 1991, back to the 2nd Round in 1992, and the 1993 Sweet Sixteen in his senior season.

Hawkins played professionally in the Continental Basketball Association and the United States Basketball League. He played overseas in China and Europe.

== Coaching career ==
Hawkins served as an assistant coach for the Prairie View A&M Panthers under head coach Jerome Francis from 2002 to 2005. After Francis' resignation, he was appointed as interim head coach for the Panthers on May 26, 2005. Hawkins amassed a 5–24 record during the 2005–06 season.

Hawkins served as an administrative assistant for the Houston Cougars from 2006 to 2010.
