= Joplo Bartu =

American football player (born 1989)

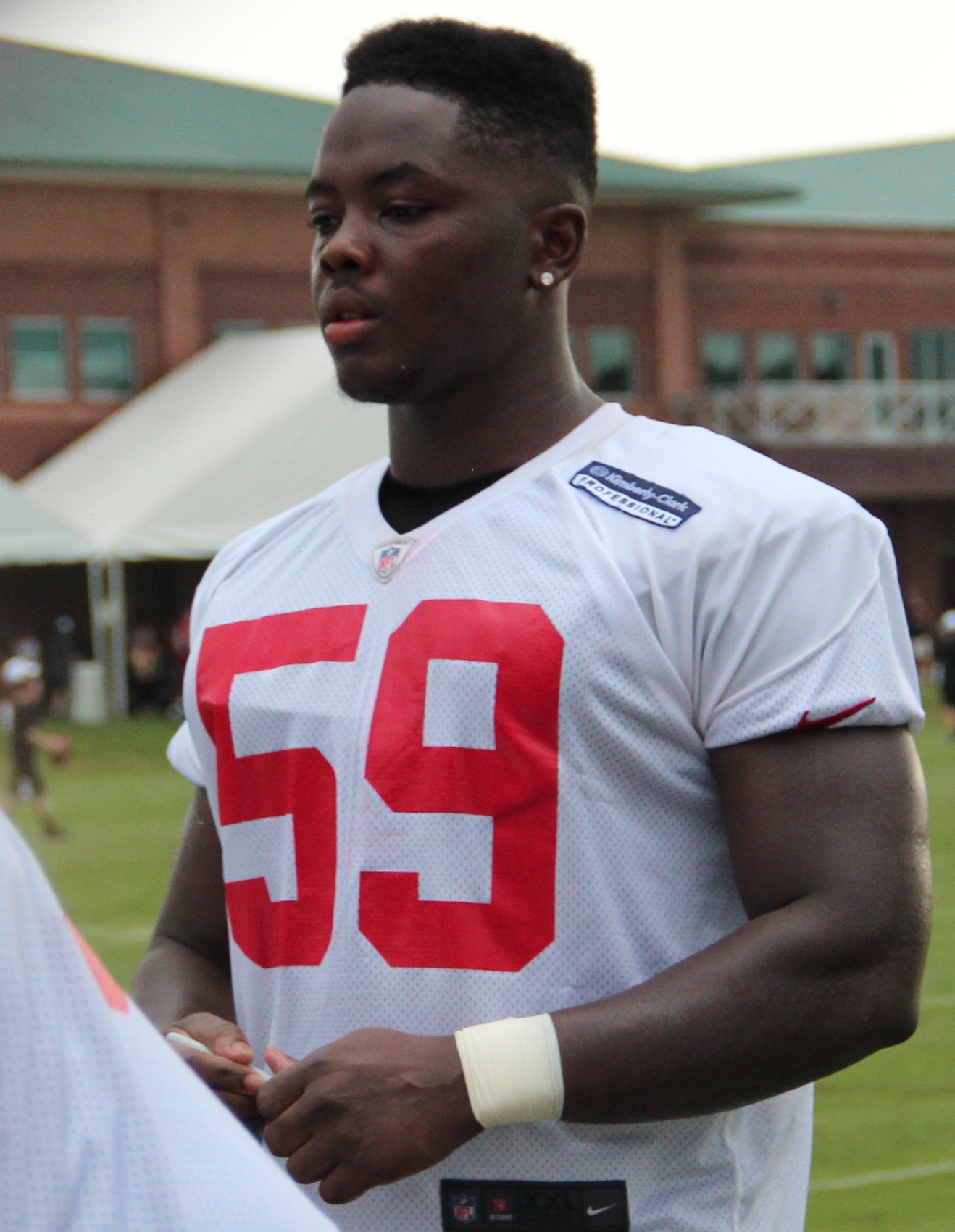
- Bartu with the Atlanta Falcons in 2013

No. 59, 54
- Position: Linebacker

Personal information
- Born: October 3, 1989 (age 37); Seattle, Washington, U.S.
- Listed height: 6 ft 2 in (1.88 m)
- Listed weight: 245 lb (111 kg)

Career information
- High school: Waller (TX)
- College: Texas State
- NFL draft: 2013: undrafted

Career history
- Atlanta Falcons (2013–2015); Jacksonville Jaguars (2015); Arizona Cardinals (2016)

Awards and highlights
- Second-team All-WAC (2012)

Career NFL statistics
- Total tackles: 179
- Sacks: 4.5
- Fumble recoveries: 2
- Pass deflections: 1
- Stats at Pro Football Reference

Joplo Johnny Bartu (born October 3, 1989) is an American former professional football player who was a linebacker in the National Football League (NFL). He played college football for the Texas State Bobcats. He was signed by the Atlanta Falcons as an undrafted free agent in 2013.

== Early life ==
Bartu was born in Seattle, Washington, on October 3, 1989, to Esther Sando. His mother was seven months pregnant when she immigrated from Monrovia, Liberia, to get a better education for herself and family. The name "Joplo" comes from a Liberian warrior, meaning "strength". At the age of one, Joplo moved from Seattle, Washington to Prairie View, Texas, located just outside the Houston area.

Bartu grew up in a low-income neighborhood with his two brothers and three sisters. At the age of 8, his mother registered Joplo and his older brother, Wellington, to play Pop Warner Football. Joplo did not attend a single game. Instead, he went to all of Wellington's games and watched as his older brother became a local star of the league. The following season Joplo, now understanding football, became one of the most talented little league players in Waller County.

As a freshman in high school, at 5'6" and 135 lbs, Bartu started off on the freshmen B-Team for Waller High School. After a couple games, he moved up and started as a running back on the freshmen A-Team. During the summer of his freshmen year, Joplo grew over six inches, becoming a standout hybrid wide receiver while playing free-safety for the Waller Bulldogs varsity squad. In his senior year, he helped lead the team to the Texas State Playoffs where they made Waller History by advancing past the 3rd round, previously set by his brother's 2004 class. Eventually, they lost a nail-biter in the State-Quarterfinals with a 10–4 record under coach Jim Phillips. Being recruited by many Division I schools across the U.S., Bartu opted to follow his brother's footsteps by committing to Texas State University.

== College career ==
At Texas State University, Bartu was a four-year starter for the Bobcats and was recruited as a free safety out of high school. However, Bartu was switched to linebacker after he gained over 20 pounds during his redshirt year. He was moved to defensive end for half of his senior year. When Bartu moved back to linebacker halfway through the season, he posted 62 tackles in four games. In his final collegiate game, Bartu finished with 17 tackles, 8 tackles for loss, 4 sacks and a forced fumble for a touchdown against New Mexico State. His performance earned him National Player of the Week by collegefootballperformance.com and he received All-WAC honors.

== Professional career ==
=== Atlanta Falcons ===
==== 2013 season ====
In his rookie season, Bartu and fellow undrafted rookie Paul Worrilow started at linebacker due to the injuries of Sean Weatherspoon and Kroy Biermann. He recorded 96 tackles and 3.5 sacks. He was nicknamed "High Top Jop" by Sean Weatherspoon on the 1st episode of "D-Block" in 2013, because of his Kid 'n Play style haircut.

Bartu saw action in all 16 games with 13 starts during his rookie season. Ranked third on the team with 96 total tackles (53 solo) while tying for the club lead with seven tackles for loss. Also added 3.5 sacks and one pass defense. His 3.5 sacks are the second most by an undrafted rookie in team history trailing Buddy Moor, who tallied four sacks in 1987 (sacks became an official stat in 1982). Led all NFL undrafted rookies with 3.5 sacks in 2013. Saw action in his first NFL game against the Saints where the Atlanta defense totaled 77 tackles and 7 tackles for loss at New Orleans. Saw extensive action for the first time in his career and delivered with eight tackles (six solo), two tackles for loss, one pass defended, and one quarterback hit against St. Louis (9/15). Had his first career start in the NFL against the dolphins and posted 6 tackles (1 solo), one quarterback hit, one pass break up and teamed up with Akeem Dent for a sack in the fourth quarter at Miami (9/22). Notched the first full sack of his career when he brought down Smith for a three-yard loss. Bartu split one sack with LB Akeem Dent at Miami in Week 3. Bartu finished the game with six tackles (three solo) with one tackle for loss and one sack against the Jets (10/7). Led the defense with 13 total tackles (eight solo) and two quarterback hits. Bartu and DE Jonathan Massaquoi combined for a five-yard sack on QB Mike Glennon against Tampa Bay (10/20). DT Peria Jerry and Bartu combined to bring down QB Carson Palmer for a nine-yard loss, giving the Falcons their third consecutive game with three-or-more sacks. Also added six tackles (four solo). Finished the game with six tackles (one solo), including an eight-yard sack of QB Russell Wilson against Seattle (11/10). He ranks second on the team with 3.5 sacks and has recorded at least one half-sack in four of the last five games. Additionally, Bartu leads all undrafted rookie defenders in the NFL with 3.5 sacks. Stated for the defense and finished the game with two tackles (two solo) against Buffalo (12/1). Credited with five tackles (four solo) against the Packers at Green Bay (12/8). Credited with six tackles (three solo) and one quarterback hit against the Redskins (12/15). Bartu had one of the best games of his young career, collaring 11 total tackles (10 solo) with one tackle for loss and one quarterback hit at San Francisco (12/23).

At the conclusion of the 2013 season, Bartu was ranked as the #1 undrafted free agent rookie of the 2013 Draft Class by Bleacher Report.

==== 2014 season ====
In Bartu's second season he played all 16 games logging 83 combined tackles, 47 tackles solo and 36 assisted. He also had one sack and two fumble recoveries.

==== 2015 season ====
On November 27, 2015, Bartu was waived by the Falcons to make room for place kicker Shayne Graham.

=== Jacksonville Jaguars ===
On December 7, 2015, Bartu signed with the Jacksonville Jaguars. On August 29, 2016, Bartu was waived by the Jaguars.

=== Arizona Cardinals ===
On September 28, 2016, Bartu was signed by the Cardinals. He was released with an injury settlement by the Cardinals on November 22, 2016.

== NFL career statistics ==
Legend
**Bold**	Career high

Year	Team	Games		Tackles					Interceptions					Fumbles			
Year	Team	GP	GS	Cmb	Solo	Ast	Sck	TFL	Int	Yds	TD	Lng	PD	FF	FR	Yds	TD
2013	ATL	**16**	13	**85**	**47**	**38**	**3.5**	**8**	0	0	0	0	**1**	0	0	0	0
2014	ATL	**16**	**14**	82	**47**	35	1.0	2	0	0	0	0	0	0	**2**	0	0
2015	ATL	7	1	11	9	2	0.0	1	0	0	0	0	0	0	0	0	0
2015	JAX	3	0	1	1	0	0.0	0	0	0	0	0	0	0	0	0	0
2016	ARI	7	0	0	0	0	0.0	0	0	0	0	0	0	0	0	0	0
		49	28	179	104	75	4.5	11	0	0	0	0	1	0	2	0	0

== Personal life ==
Joplo is the middle child of 5 siblings: Precious (oldest sister), Wellington (older brother), Bindu (younger sister), Lawrence (younger brother) and Lula (youngest sister).

In October 2013, Bartu was told that his mother was sick and had three months to live. On December 29, 2013, Bartu's mother died from breast cancer. His mother would text the verses Psalms 18:1-3 every Sunday morning before each game. He now has the verses tattooed on his arm in her honor.
