= Pine Island, Texas =

- Town
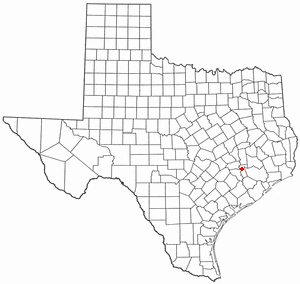
- Location of Pine Island, Texas

- Coordinates: 30°3′48″N 96°1′23″W
- Country: United States
- State: Texas
- County: Waller

Area
  - Total: 9.36 sq mi (24.24 km^{2})
  - Land: 9.34 sq mi (24.20 km^{2})
  - Water: 0.015 sq mi (0.04 km^{2})
- Elevation: 200 ft (60 m)

Population (2020)
  - Total: 1,077
  - Density: 115.3/sq mi (44.50/km^{2})
- Time zone: UTC-6 (Central (CST))
  - Summer (DST): UTC-5 (CDT)
- ZIP code: 77445
- Area code: 979
- FIPS code: 48-57615
- GNIS feature ID: 1388558
- Website: pineislandtx.gov

Pine Island is a town in Waller County, Texas, United States near the intersection of Farm to Market Road 359 and Farm to Market Road 3346. The population was 1,077 at the 2020 census. It is not affiliated with the uninhabited island of the same name in Lake Livingston.

== Geography ==
Pine Island is located at 30°3′48″N 96°1′23″W (30.063433, –96.022968). According to the United States Census Bureau, the town has a total area of 9.3 square miles (24.2 km^{2}), of which 9.3 square miles (24.2 km^{2}) is land and 0.11% is water.

The western boundary of the town is formed by Clear Creek, which flows from north to south. U.S. Route 290 Business on either side of FM 359 is part of the northern town limit. Cochran Road from north of Brumlow Road south to Betka Road forms the eastern boundary. The southern boundary is formed by Betka Road and an irregular line running west to Clear Creek.

== Demographics ==
Historical population
Census	Pop.	Note	%±
1990	571		—
2000	849		48.7%
2010	988		16.4%
2020	1,077		9.0%
U.S. Decennial Census; 2020 Census

As of the census of 2000, there were 849 people, 295 households, and 225 families residing in the town. The population density was 91.0 inhabitants per square mile (35.1/km^{2}). There were 333 housing units at an average density of 35.7 per square mile (13.8/km^{2}). The racial makeup of the town was 73.14% White, 12.13% African American, 0.82% Native American, 0.59% Asian, 10.48% from other races, and 2.83% from two or more races. Hispanic or Latino of any race were 22.03% of the population.

There were 295 households, out of which 36.6% had children under the age of 18 living with them, 62.0% were married couples living together, 11.2% had a female householder with no husband present, and 23.4% were non-families. 15.6% of all households were made up of individuals, and 6.4% had someone living alone who was 65 years of age or older. The average household size was 2.88 and the average family size was 3.21.

In the town, the population distribution was as follows: 28.5% were under the age of 18, 9.2% were between 18 and 24, 28.0% were between 25 and 44, 23.2% were between 45 and 64, and 11.1% were 65 or older. The median age was 34 years. For every 100 females, there were 108.1 males. For every 100 females aged 18 and over, there were 102.3 males.

The median income for a household in the town was $45,000, and the median income for a family was $50,714. Males had a median income of $34,167 versus $31,250 for females. The per capita income for the town was $18,597. About 4.7% of families and 7.2% of the population were below the poverty line, including 7.8% of those under age 18 and 4.8% of those age 65 or over.

== Education ==
The Town of Pine Island is served by the Waller Independent School District.

Zoned schools include:

- Waller High School
- Waller Junior High School
- Herman T. Jones Elementary School (Prairie View)

All of Waller County is in the service area of Blinn College. Blinn operates the Waller-Harris County Campus.
