= Second Corinth, Texas =

- Unincorporated community
- Location within Texas Location within the United States
- Coordinates: 30°08′36″N 96°07′03″W
- Country: United States
- State: Texas
- County: Waller
- Elevation: 200 ft (61 m)
- Time zone: UTC-6 (Central (CST))
  - Summer (DST): UTC-5 (CDT)
- Area code: 979
- GNIS feature ID: 1379048

Second Corinth is an unincorporated community in Waller County, Texas, United States. Second Corinth is 3.9 miles (6.3 km) northwest of Hempstead.

All of Waller County is in the service area of Blinn College.
