= Jason Phillips (linebacker) =

American football player (born 1986)

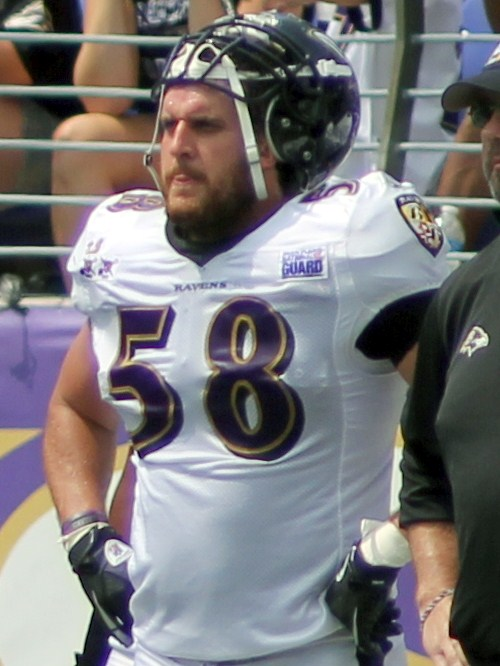
- Philips with the Baltimore Ravens in 2011

No. 58, 53
- Position: Linebacker

Personal information
- Born: February 14, 1986 (age 40); Waller, Texas, U.S.
- Listed height: 6 ft 1 in (1.85 m)
- Listed weight: 236 lb (107 kg)

Career information
- High school: Waller (TX)
- College: TCU
- NFL draft: 2009: 5th round, 137th overall pick

Career history
- Baltimore Ravens (2009−2011); Carolina Panthers (2011−2012); Philadelphia Eagles (2013)

Awards and highlights
- 2× First-team All-MW (2006, 2008); 2× Second-team All-MW (2005, 2007)

Career NFL statistics
- Total tackles: 31
- Forced fumbles: 2
- Stats at Pro Football Reference

Jason Wesley Phillips (born February 14, 1986) is an American former professional football player who was a linebacker in the National Football League (NFL). He was selected by the Baltimore Ravens in the fifth round of the 2009 NFL draft. He played college football at Texas Christian University (TCU).

Phillips was also a member of the Carolina Panthers and Philadelphia Eagles.

== Early life ==
Phillips played quarterback and linebacker at Waller High School in Waller, Texas, where he was coached by his father, Jim Phillips. He also served as the Bulldogs' long snapper. As a senior in 2003, he threw for 1,070 yards and rushed for 1,291 to earn District 18-4A MVP honors. He also ran track at Waller, and was a regional qualifier in the 110 meter hurdles.

== College career ==
Once at TCU, Phillips redshirted in 2004 as a fullback. In 2005, he was moved to linebacker and immediately earned a starting job. His first collegiate game was a 17-10 win against Oklahoma in Norman. That year, Phillips led the Horned Frogs in tackles and helped them win their first-ever Mountain West Conference Championship. He became the first freshman in conference history to be named All-MWC, as a Second-team selection. He was also named MWC Freshman of the Year by College Football News and Second-team Freshman All-America by The Sporting News. As a sophomore in 2006, Phillips was named First-team All-MWC and was second on the team in tackles.

Heading into his junior season, he started all 25 games of his college career. Recently Dave Campbell's Texas Football selected Phillips to their 2007 Preseason All-Texas College Team.

=== College awards and honors ===
- Second-team All-MWC (2005)
- First-team All-MWC (2006, 2007, and 2008)

== Professional career ==
=== Baltimore Ravens ===
Phillips was drafted by the Baltimore Ravens with the first pick (137th overall) in the fifth round of the 2009 NFL draft.

On September 17, 2011, he was waived by Baltimore.

=== Carolina Panthers ===
The Carolina Panthers claimed Phillips off of waivers on September 19.

=== Philadelphia Eagles ===
Phillips signed with the Philadelphia Eagles on March 12, 2013.

On July 29, 2013, Phillips tore his right anterior cruciate ligament (ACL) in the Eagles' first training camp of the preseason. On August 19, 2014, Phillips was released in the first round of roster cuts.

== Personal life ==
Phillips and his wife, Brooke, were married in March 2026.
