= Sunny Side, Waller County, Texas =

Sunny Side
- Unincorporated community
- Location in United States Location in Texas
- Coordinates: 29°53′19″N 96°04′09″W
- Country: United States
- State: Texas
- County: Waller
- Elevation: 144 ft (44 m)

Population (2009)
  - Total: 250
- Time zone: UTC-6 (CST)
  - Summer (DST): UTC-5 (CDT)

Sunny Side is an unincorporated community in Waller County, Texas, United States. According to the Handbook of Texas, the community had an estimated population of 120 in 2000.

All of Waller County is in the service area of Blinn College.
