= Fields Store, Texas =

Unincorporated community in Texas, US

Coordinates: 30°08′41″N 95°57′22″W

Fields Store is an unincorporated community in northeastern Waller County, Texas, United States.

The community is located at the junction of Farm to Market Road 362 North and Farm to Market Road 1488.

== Education ==
The settlement is within Waller Independent School District.

Schools serving Field Store include:

- Waller High School (Unincorporated Harris County)
- Wayne C. Schultz Junior High School (Unincorporated Harris County)
- Fields Store Elementary School (Unincorporated Waller County)

All of Waller County is in the service area of Blinn College. Blinn operates the Waller-Harris County Campus.
