= Carl A. Urbantke =

American minister and founder of Blinn College

- Born: Carl August Urbantke; December 3, 1831; Bielitz, Austrian Silesia (now Bielsko-Biała, Poland)
- Died: July 12, 1912 (aged 80); Brenham, Texas, U.S.
- Resting place: Brenham, Texas
- Occupations: Methodist minister; Educator; Author; Pioneer
- Years active: c. 1853–1912
- Known for: Founding role in Blinn Memorial College; memoir of early Texas life
- Notable work: Texas is the Place for Me

Carl August Urbantke (December 3, 1831 – July 12, 1912) was an Austrian-born American Methodist minister, educator, author, and pioneer settler in Texas. He is best known for his role in the establishment of Blinn Memorial College in Brenham, Texas, and for his autobiography Texas is the Place for Me, a detailed firsthand account of German-speaking immigration and frontier life in nineteenth-century Texas.

== Early life and education ==
Urbantke was born in Bielitz, Austrian Silesia, into a family of cloth weavers. He attended a Lutheran parochial school, where he received an education through the age of fourteen. Economic hardship caused by the decline of traditional weaving trades, combined with political unrest following the revolutions of 1848 and the prospect of extended military service, contributed to his decision to emigrate.

== Emigration and settlement in Texas ==
In August 1853, Urbantke emigrated to the United States aboard a ship bound for Texas. He arrived during a yellow fever outbreak and was disembarked upriver from Galveston to avoid the epidemic. He initially worked in railroad construction, farming, milling, and other forms of manual labor common to frontier settlements.

By the mid-1850s, Urbantke had purchased land along Mill Creek in what is now Austin County, Texas, where he constructed a log home and began farming. Over time, he brought members of his family from Europe to join him in Texas, establishing a permanent homestead.

== Ministry and religious work ==
In 1867, Urbantke entered the ministry of the Methodist Episcopal Church, in the north, following the American Civil War. He was drawn to the denomination in part because of its opposition to slavery and its support for German-language religious materials.

Urbantke served as a circuit-riding minister, traveling extensively across south-central Texas. His ministry included preaching, pastoral care, and organizing congregations across a wide geographic area, including regions stretching from Houston to Austin and Waco. His memoir records the challenges of frontier ministry, including long travel distances, illness, and natural disasters such as hurricanes and floods.

== Blinn Memorial College ==
Urbantke played an important role in the establishment of Blinn Memorial College in Brenham during the 1880s. The institution was founded as a German-Methodist school intended to educate teachers and ministers. Urbantke worked closely with other Methodist leaders and helped lay the organizational and spiritual foundations of the college, which later evolved into the public Blinn College system.

Blinn College is recognized as the oldest operating junior college in Texas.

== German Methodist community leadership ==
Urbantke was active in German Methodist communities throughout central Texas, including Millheim, Cat Spring, Industry, and Grassyville. These communities helped preserve German language, culture, and religious life among immigrant settlers.

A German Methodist church associated with these congregations was later relocated to Brenham and now stands as part of the Brenham Presbyterian Church historic complex. The structure has been documented by the U.S. Library of Congress through the Historic American Buildings Survey.

== Autobiography ==
Urbantke completed his autobiography in German in 1902 under the title Texas ist der rechte Platz für mich. The work chronicles his emigration, frontier experiences, religious conversion, and decades of ministry in Texas. An English translation by his daughter, Ella Urbantke Fischer, was published posthumously and has been cited by historians as a valuable primary source on nineteenth-century German-Texan settlement and religious life.

== Death and legacy ==
Urbantke died on July 12, 1912, in Brenham, Texas, and was buried there. His writings continue to be used by historians and genealogists studying German immigration, frontier settlement, and the development of Methodist institutions in Texas.

== Works ==
- Texas is the Place for Me: The Autobiography of a German Immigrant Youth (1902; English edition published 1970)
