= Gabe Hall =

American football player (born 2001)

No. 96 – Philadelphia Eagles
- Position: Defensive tackle
- Roster status: Practice squad

Personal information
- Born: January 12, 2001 (age 25); Waller, Texas, U.S.
- Listed height: 6 ft 6 in (1.98 m)
- Listed weight: 295 lb (134 kg)

Career information
- High school: Waller
- College: Baylor (2019–2023)
- NFL draft: 2024: undrafted

Career history
- Philadelphia Eagles (2024–present)

Awards and highlights
- Super Bowl champion (LIX)
- Stats at Pro Football Reference

Gabriel Hall (born January 12, 2001) is an American professional football defensive tackle for the Philadelphia Eagles of the National Football League (NFL). He played college football for the Baylor Bears.

== Early life ==
Hall attended high school at Waller. Coming out of high school, Hall was rated as a three-star recruit where he decided to commit to play college football for the Baylor Bears.

== College career ==
In Hall's freshman season in 2019, he played in just three games after suffering an injury, totaling three tackles and a blocked kick. Hall made just two tackles during the 2020 season. During the 2021 season versus Kansas State, Hall had a breakout game tallying three sacks. During the 2021 season, Hall notched 18 tackles, with seven going for a loss, six sacks, and a forced fumble. In week nine of the 2022 season, Hall notched three sacks in a win over Texas Tech. For his performance on the week, he was named the Big-12 defensive player of the week. Hall finished the 2022 season with 37 tackles with five and a half being for a loss, four and a half sacks, two pass deflections, a fumble recovery, and a touchdown. Heading into the 2023 season, Hall was named preseason third-team all Big-12. Hall was also named to the Nagurski Trophy watch list in the 2023 preseason.

== Professional career ==
Pre-draft measurables
Height	Weight	Arm length	Hand span	Wingspan	40-yard dash	10-yard split	20-yard split	20-yard shuttle	Three-cone drill	Vertical jump	Broad jump
6 ft 6 in (1.98 m)	291 lb (132 kg)	34 1/2 in (0.88 m)	9 1/2 in (0.24 m)	6 ft 11 5/8 in (2.12 m)	5.03 s	1.72 s	2.88 s	4.67 s	7.65 s	31.5 in (0.80 m)	9 ft 7 in (2.92 m)
All values from NFL Combine

Hall was signed by the Philadelphia Eagles as an undrafted free agent on May 3, 2024. He was also selected by the San Antonio Brahmas as the seventh overall selection in the 2024 UFL draft on July 17. He was waived on August 27, and re-signed to the practice squad. Hall won a Super Bowl championship when the Eagles defeated the Kansas City Chiefs 40–22 in Super Bowl LIX. Hall signed a reserve/future contract with Philadelphia on February 14, 2025.

Hall made the Eagles' initial 53-man roster in 2025, but was waived on September 9, 2025 and re-signed to the practice squad two days later. He signed a reserve/future contract with Philadelphia on January 12, 2026.

On August 29, 2026, Hall was waived by the Eagles as a part of final roster cuts. Two days later, the Eagles re–signed Hall to their practice squad. On September 22, Hall was released by Philadelphia, but re-signed a week later.
