= Waller High School =

Location
- 20950 Field Store Road; Waller, Texas 77484; United States; 30°4′43″N 95°55′12.6″W

Information
- School type: Public high school
- Established: 1887
- School district: Waller Independent School District
- Principal: Christopher Oldham
- Teaching staff: 166.72 (FTE)
- Grades: 9-12
- Enrollment: 2,846 (2023–2024)
- Student to teacher ratio: 17.07
- Colors: Maroon and white
- Athletics conference: UIL Class AAAAAA
- Mascot: Bulldogs
- Newspaper: Waller ISD News Bits (online)
- Website: Waller High School website

Waller High School is a public high school in unincorporated Harris County, Texas, north of Waller, and classified as a 6A school by the UIL. It is part of the Waller Independent School District and serves students from Waller, Pine Island, Prairie View, unincorporated sections of Waller County (including Fields Store), and unincorporated sections of Harris County (including Hockley). In 2013, the school was rated "Met Standard" by the Texas Education Agency.

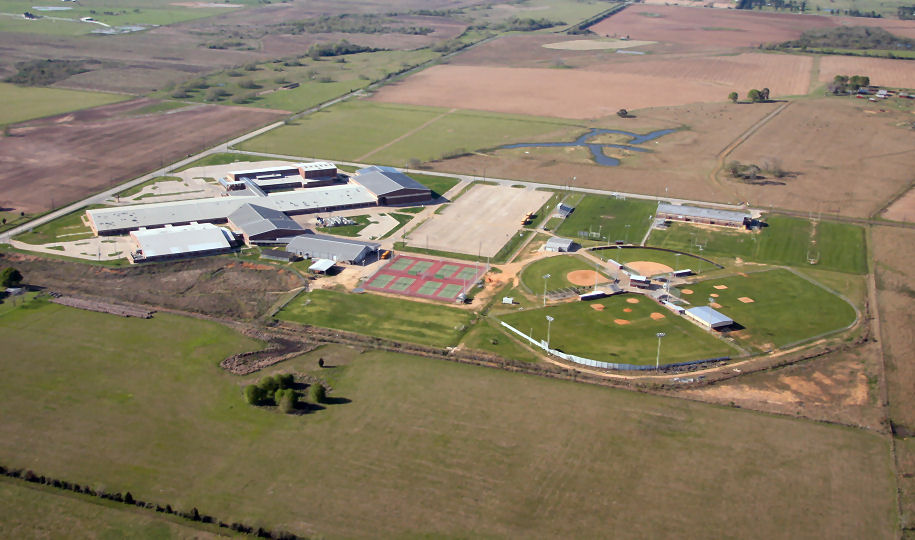
Aerial photo of Waller High School, 21 March 2008

== Academics ==
The 2003-2004 Waller High School Computer Science Team won the UIL 4A State Championship.

The 2004-2005 Waller High School Computer Science Team won the UIL 4A State Championship.

The 2004-2005 Waller High School Computer Science Team won the TCEA Large School (4A-5A) State Co-Championship.

The 2020-2021 Waller High School Social Studies Team won the UIL 5A State Championship.

The 2021-2022 Waller High School Current Events Team won the UIL 5A State Championship.

The 2022-2023 Waller High School Accounting Team won the UIL 6A State Championship

The 2022-2023 Waller High School Literary Criticism Team won the UIL 6A State Championship

The 2023-2024 Waller High School Accounting Team won the UIL 6A State Championship

The 2023-2024 Waller High School Literary Criticism Team won the UIL 6A State Championship

The Waller High School UIL Academic Team won the district sweepstakes championship in 2002, 2011, 2012, 2013, 2019, and 2021.

The Waller High School UIL Academic Team won the region sweepstakes championship in 2023

The Wall High School UIL Academic Team won second runner-up 6A state sweepstakes honors in 2024

The Waller High School Football Team made the 2025-2026 Playoffs

== Athletics ==
The 2007-08 Waller girls' wrestling team won both the 2008 State Duals title as well as District 22-5A and Region III-5A titles.

The 2007 Bulldog football team went 4 rounds deep in the playoffs, losing to Dayton in the regional final.

The 2008-09 girls' basketball team ended a 20+ year playoff drought by advancing to the postseason.

The district also has a new 10,000 seat stadium adjacent to the high school which opened on August 28, 2009.

== 2012 shooting threat ==
On March 20, 2012, former student Trey Eric Sesler shot and killed his mother, father and brother. He then drove to Waller High School and had planned to shoot students at the school, however he backed out as it got "too real".

== Notable alumni ==
- Joplo Bartu - linebacker for the Arizona Cardinals of the National Football League
- A. J. Foyt IV - former Indy Car Driver
- Gabe Hall – American college football defensive tackle for the Philadelphia Eagles, formerly the Baylor Bears
- Bomani Jones - ESPN personality
- Jason Phillips - former linebacker for the Philadelphia Eagles of the National Football League
- DJ Premier - Record Producer and DJ
