= Prairie View, Texas =

Prairie View
- City
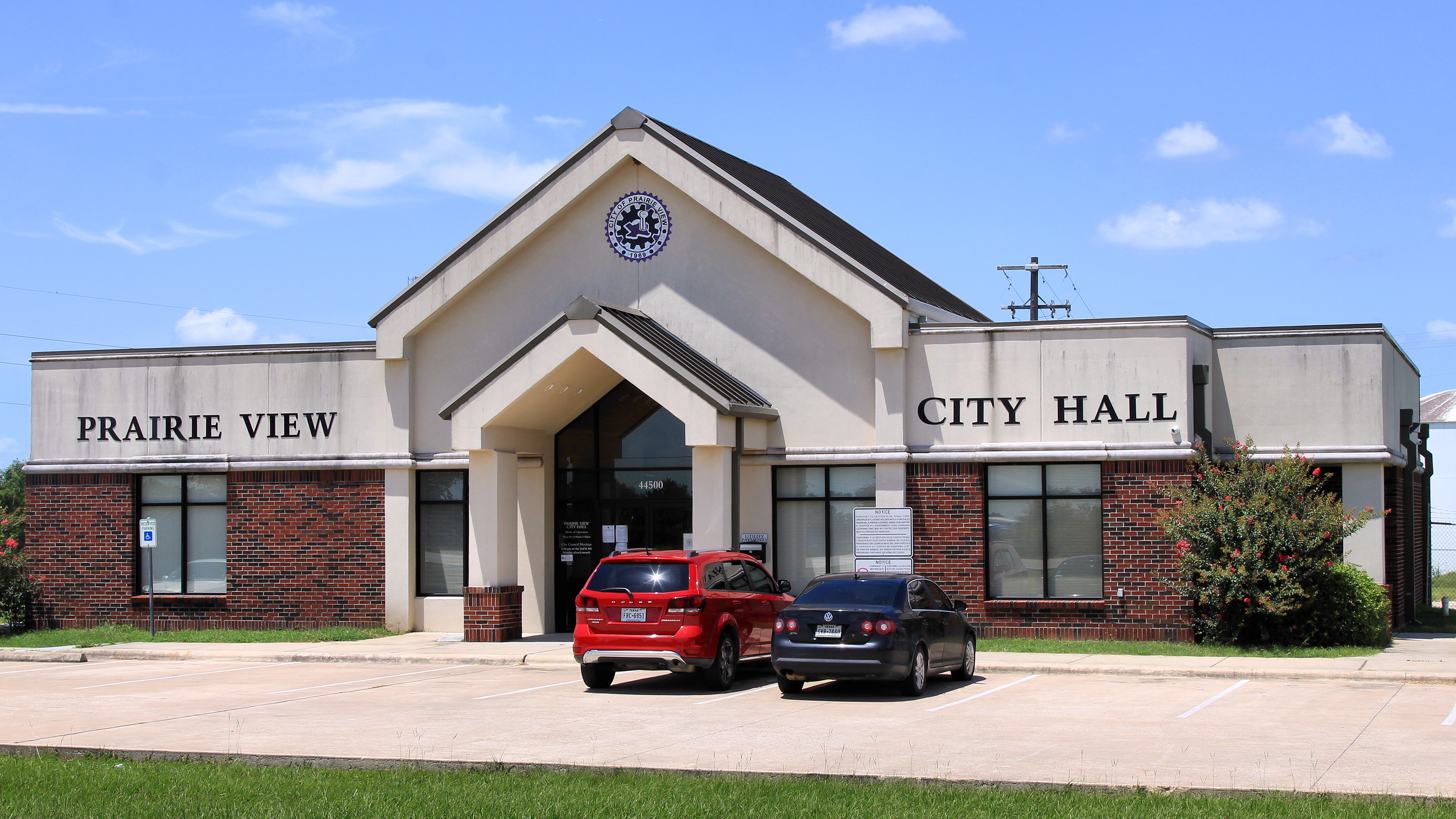
- Prairie View City Hall

- Location of Prairie View, Texas
- Coordinates: 30°4′56″N 95°59′30″W
- Country: United States
- State: Texas
- County: Waller

Government
  - Type: Council-Manager
  - Mayor: no incumbent

Area
  - Total: 7.35 sq mi (19.03 km^{2})
  - Land: 7.35 sq mi (19.03 km^{2})
  - Water: 0 sq mi (0.00 km^{2})
- Elevation: 269 ft (82 m)

Population (2020)
  - Total: 8,184
  - Estimate (2025): 8,969
  - Density: 946.2/sq mi (365.34/km^{2})
- Time zone: UTC-6 (Central (CST))
  - Summer (DST): UTC-5 (CDT)
- ZIP code: 77446
- Area code: 936
- FIPS code: 48-59336
- GNIS feature ID: 1344521
- Website: www.prairieviewtexas.gov

Prairie View is a city in Waller County, Texas, United States, situated on the northwestern edge of the Houston–Pasadena–The Woodlands metropolitan area. The population was 8,184 at the 2020 census.

Prairie View A&M University, the second-oldest public university in Texas, is based in the city.

== Geography ==
Prairie View is located at 30°4′56″N 95°59′30″W (30.082131, –95.991788).

According to the United States Census Bureau, the city has a total area of 7.2 square miles (18.7 km^{2}), all land. The city is bisected by US 290 and is neighbored by Hempstead to the west, Waller to the east, and Pine Island to the south.

== Demographics ==
Historical population
Census	Pop.	Note	%±
1960	2,326		—
1970	3,796		63.2%
1980	3,993		5.2%
1990	4,004		0.3%
2000	4,410		10.1%
2010	5,576		26.4%
2020	8,184		46.8%
U.S. Decennial Census

=== Racial and ethnic composition ===
Prairie View city, Texas – Racial and ethnic composition Note: the US Census treats Hispanic/Latino as an ethnic category. This table excludes Latinos from the racial categories and assigns them to a separate category. Hispanics/Latinos may be of any race.
Race / Ethnicity (NH = Non-Hispanic)	Pop 2000	Pop 2010	Pop 2020	% 2000	% 2010	% 2020
White alone (NH)	116	147	184	2.63%	2.64%	2.25%
Black or African American alone (NH)	4,113	4,884	6,712	93.27%	87.59%	82.01%
Native American or Alaska Native alone (NH)	4	6	31	0.09%	0.11%	0.38%
Asian alone (NH)	19	19	17	0.43%	0.34%	0.21%
Native Hawaiian or Pacific Islander alone (NH)	0	1	1	0.00%	0.02%	0.01%
Other race alone (NH)	7	1	118	0.16%	0.02%	1.44%
Mixed race or Multiracial (NH)	34	91	51	0.77%	1.63%	0.62%
Hispanic or Latino (any race)	117	427	1,070	2.65%	7.66%	13.07%
Total	4,410	5,576	8,184	100.00%	100.00%	100.00%

=== 2020 census ===
As of the 2020 census, Prairie View had a population of 8,184 people, a median age of 20.3 years, 7.5% of residents were under the age of 18, and 4.2% of residents were 65 years of age or older; for every 100 females there were 56.7 males, and for every 100 females age 18 and over there were 55.1 males age 18 and over. The census counted 918 households, including 353 families, residing in the city.

0.0% of residents lived in urban areas, while 100.0% lived in rural areas.

Of those households, 30.4% had children under the age of 18 living in them, 28.8% were married-couple households, 29.2% were households with a male householder and no spouse or partner present, 38.7% were households with a female householder and no spouse or partner present, about 29.1% of all households were made up of individuals, and 9.8% had someone living alone who was 65 years of age or older.

There were 1,307 housing units, of which 29.8% were vacant. The homeowner vacancy rate was 3.5% and the rental vacancy rate was 27.5%.

Racial composition as of the 2020 census
Race	Number	Percent
White	289	3.5%
Black or African American	6,722	82.1%
American Indian and Alaska Native	61	0.7%
Asian	18	0.2%
Native Hawaiian and Other Pacific Islander	1	0.0%
Some other race	820	10.0%
Two or more races	273	3.3%

=== 2000 census ===
As of the census of 2000, there were 4,410 people, 694 households, and 360 families residing in the city. The population density was 611.0 inhabitants per square mile (235.9/km^{2}). There were 834 housing units at an average density of 115.6 per square mile (44.6/km^{2}). The racial makeup of the city was 3.47% White, 93.51% African American, 0.18% Native American, 0.43% Asian, 1.36% from other races, and 1.04% from two or more races. Hispanic or Latino of any race were 2.65% of the population.

There were 694 households, out of which 21.3% had children under the age of 18 living with them, 32.1% were married couples living together, 15.4% had a female householder with no husband present, and 48.0% were non-families. 32.3% of all households were made up of individuals, and 13.1% had someone living alone who was 65 years of age or older. The average household size was 2.42 and the average family size was 3.21.

In the city, the population was spread out, with 9.1% under the age of 18, 68.2% from 18 to 24, 10.3% from 25 to 44, 6.5% from 45 to 64, and 5.9% who were 65 years of age or older. The median age was 21 years. For every 100 females, there were 88.4 males. For every 100 females age 18 and over, there were 87.9 males.

The median income for a household in the city was $24,805, and the median income for a family was $36,071. Males had a median income of $25,882 versus $21,161 for females. The per capita income for the city was $8,219. About 13.2% of families and 24.4% of the population were below the poverty line, including 18.2% of those under age 18 and 14.9% of those age 65 or over.

== Government and infrastructure ==
The City of Prairie View was established in 1969 with the motto: "Productive, United, Indomitable." The city is operated by a mayor-council government of the strong-mayor format. The format functions with the Mayor serving as both Chair of the City Council and Chief Executive of the city's administration.

As of October 2025 there is no mayor listed, and an acting city manager listed on the city website. The city practices zoning to control land use and improve quality of life. The city has hired Butler Planning Services (BPS) to develop a Geographic Information System (GIS) which will aid the city staff in mapping the community. The city is also considering a partnership with BPS and another planning firm, IPS Group, to develop a new Comprehensive Plan.

=== County, state, and federal representation ===
The United States Postal Service Prairie View Post Office is located at 21212 Farm to Market Road 1098 Loop.

== Education ==
=== Colleges and universities ===
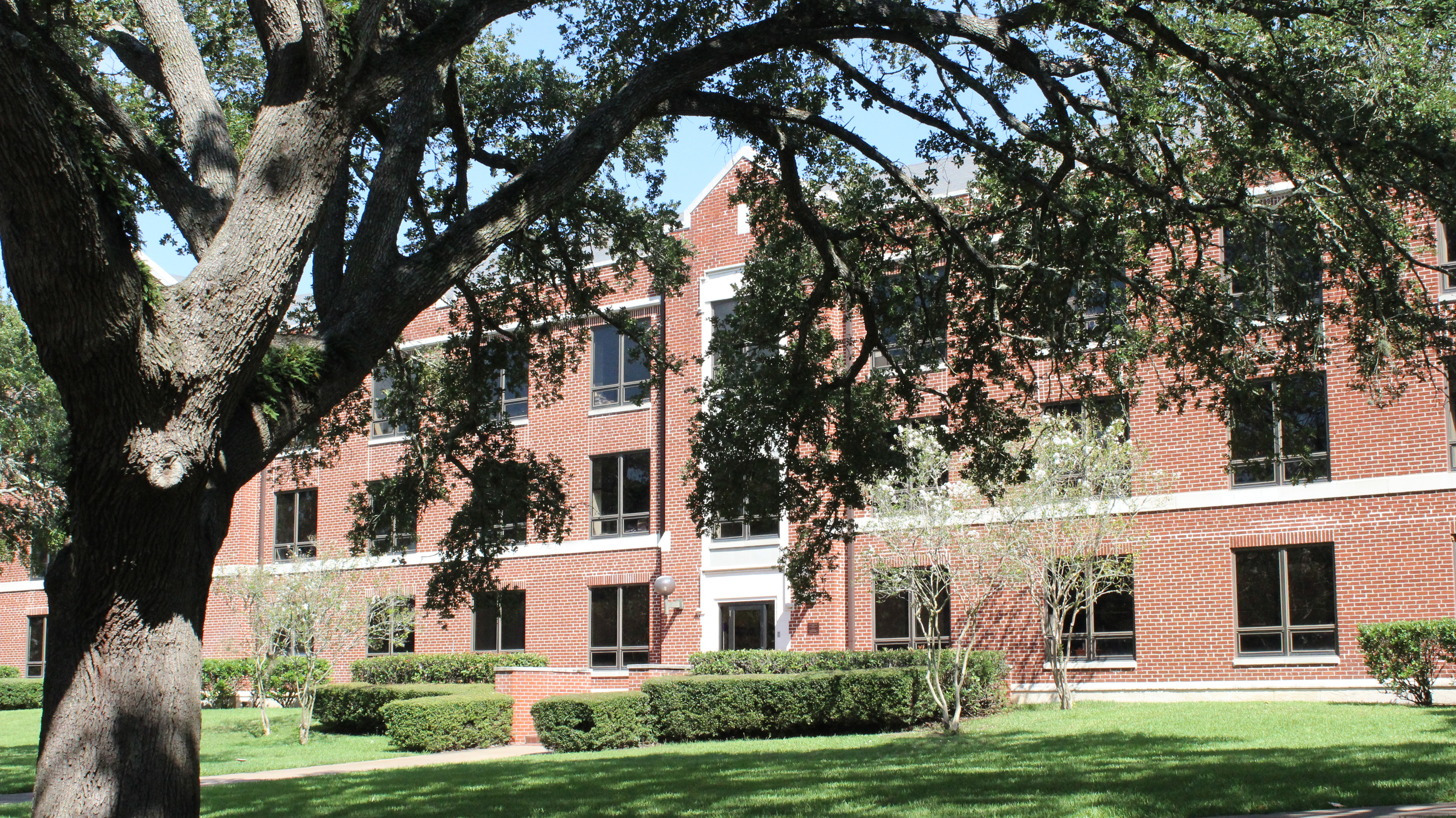
Evans Hall at Prairie View A&M University

Prairie View is home to Prairie View A&M University. The university was established in 1876 as a historically black college under the Morill Land-Grant Acts, making it the first public institution of higher learning in Texas to educate African-Americans. Prairie View A&M grants both graduate and undergraduate degrees in more than 50 majors and is classified as a Doctoral/Research University by the Carnegie Foundation. As of fall 2022, Prairie View A&M is the largest HBCU in the state and one of the largest in the country with nearly 9,500 students, approximately 83% Black/African-American.

Blinn College is the designated community college for residents of the Waller Independent School District. Blinn operates the Waller-Harris County Campus.

=== Primary and secondary schools ===
The City of Prairie View is served by the Waller Independent School District.

Schools serving Prairie View include:

- Waller High School (Unincorporated Harris County)
- As of 2024 most of Prairie View is zoned to Wayne C. Schultz Junior High School (Unincorporated Harris County), while portions south of Business 290 are zoned to Waller Junior High School (Waller)
- Herman T. Jones Elementary School (Prairie View)

== Transportation ==
Greyhound Bus Lines serves the Prairie View Station at Unco Food Store.

== Parks and recreation ==
In September 2018 a cricket complex in Prairie View was scheduled to open. It was established by Pakistani American Tanweer Ahmed.

== Sister cities ==
Prairie View's sister cities are:

- Aseseeso, Ghana
- Guachené, Colombia
- Manta, Colombia
- Pabellón de Arteaga, Mexico
- Punta Gorda, Belize
