= Waller Independent School District =

School district in Texas, United States

Address
- 2214 Waller Street Waller, Texas, 77484; United States

District information
- Type: Public
- Grades: PK–12
- Schools: 9
- NCES District ID: 4844430

Students and staff
- Students: 9,283 (2023–2024)
- Teachers: 599.58 (on an FTE basis) (2023–2024)
- Staff: 661.98 (on an FTE basis) (2023–2024)
- Student–teacher ratio: 15.48 (2023–2024)

Other information
- Website: www.wallerisd.net

Waller Independent School District is a public school district based in Waller, Texas (USA).

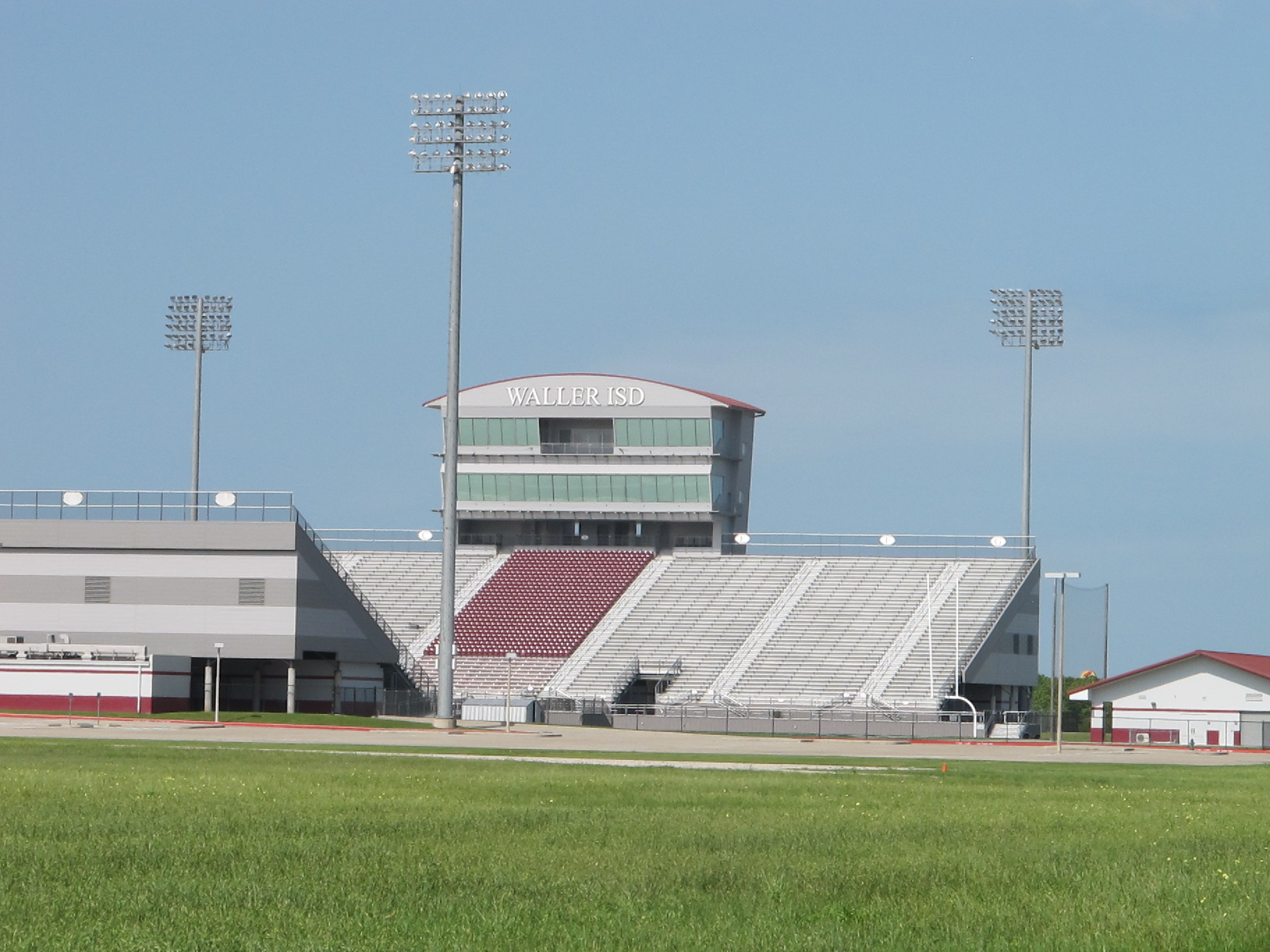
Daikin Stadium, 2016

In addition to Waller, the district serves the cities of Prairie View and Pine Island. In addition, it serves unincorporated sections of Waller County, including Fields Store, and unincorporated sections of Harris County, including Hockley.

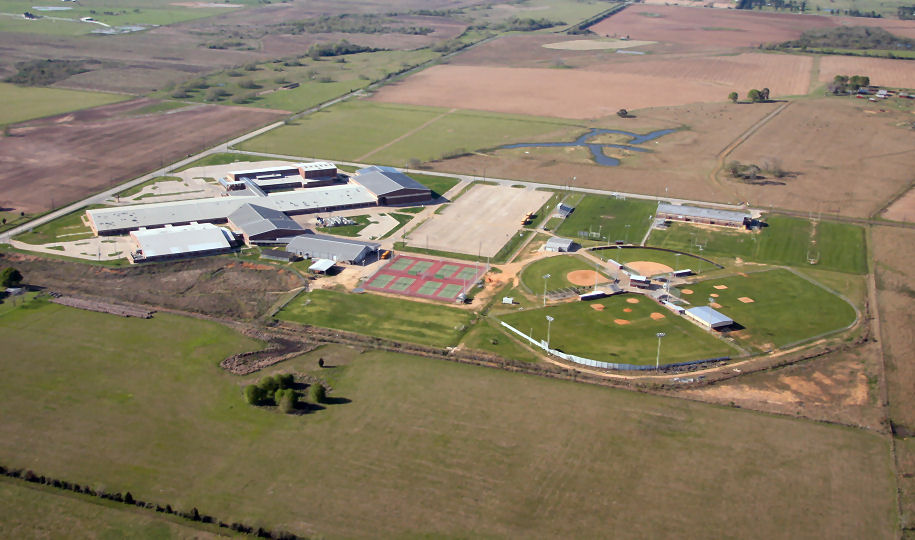
Aerial photo of Schultz Jr. High School (formerly Waller High School).

In 2013, Waller ISD and all 8 schools earned the highest Texas Education Agency accountability rating, 'Met Standard.' Five schools received 8 Academic Achievement Distinction Designations. In 2010, the school district was rated "Recognized" by the Texas Education Agency. The ISD American football teams play at the 10,000-capacity Daikin Stadium.

== Schools ==
=== Secondary schools ===
- Waller High School (unincorporated Harris County, near Waller) 30°4′43″N 95°55′12.6″W
- Warren Ranch High School (future - to open in 2028) (Hockley, unincorporated Harris County)
- Waller Junior High School (Waller)
- Wayne C. Schultz Junior High School (Waller)

=== Primary schools ===
Primary schools cover pre-Kindergarten through 5th Grade.

- Fields Store Elementary School (Fields Store, Unincorporated Waller County)
- I. T. Holleman Elementary School (Waller)
- Herman T. Jones Elementary School (Prairie View)
- Roberts Road Elementary School (Hockley, unincorporated Harris County)
- Turlington Elementary School (Hockley, unincorporated Harris County)
- Bryan Lowe Elementary School (Hockley, unincorporated Harris County)
- Richard T. McReavy Elementary School (Hockley, unincorporated Harris County)
- Mary Alice Cure Elementary (Waller)
