= Waller, Texas =

City in Harris and Waller counties in Texas, United States

- City
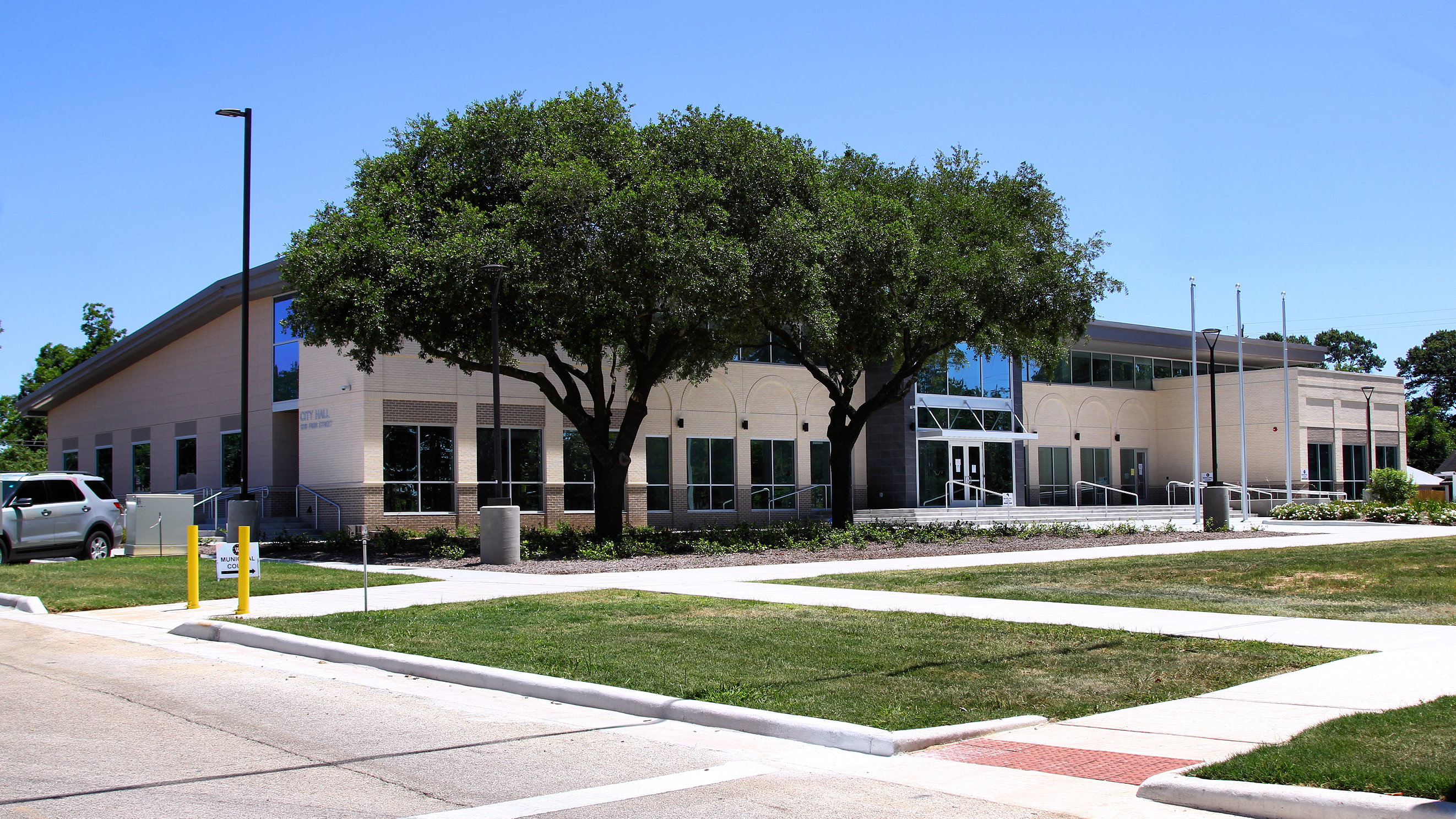
- Waller City Hall, June 2020

- Location in Harris County and the state of Texas
- Coordinates: 30°3′32″N 95°55′35″W
- Country: United States
- State: Texas
- Counties: Waller, Harris

Area
  - Total: 3.72 sq mi (9.64 km^{2})
  - Land: 3.69 sq mi (9.55 km^{2})
  - Water: 0.035 sq mi (0.09 km^{2})
- Elevation: 253 ft (77 m)

Population (2020)
  - Total: 2,682
  - Estimate (2022): 3,117
  - Density: 946/sq mi (365.3/km^{2})
- Time zone: UTC-6 (Central (CST))
  - Summer (DST): UTC-5 (CDT)
- ZIP code: 77484
- Area code: 936
- FIPS code: 48-76228
- GNIS feature ID: 1349400
- Website: www.wallertexas.gov

Waller is a city in Harris and Waller counties in Texas, United States, that is within the Houston–Pasadena–The Woodlands metropolitan area. Its population was 2,682 at the 2020 U.S. census. The Waller area is located along U.S. Route 290 (Northwest Freeway) 41 miles (66 km) northwest of downtown Houston.

== Geography ==
Waller is located at 30°3′32″N 95°55′35″W (30.058752, –95.926336). Most land development within Waller is located near the historic town center. However, businesses oriented toward travelers are beginning to locate along the U.S. Route 290 corridor.

According to the United States Census Bureau, the city has a total area of 2.1 square miles (5.4 km^{2}), of which 0.004 square miles (0.01 km^{2}), or 0.22%, is covered by water.

=== Climate ===
The climate in this area is characterized by hot, humid summers and generally mild to cool winters. According to the Köppen climate classification, Waller has a humid subtropical climate, Cfa on climate maps.

== Demographics ==
Historical population
Census	Pop.	Note	%±
1950	715		—
1960	900		25.9%
1970	1,123		24.8%
1980	1,241		10.5%
1990	1,493		20.3%
2000	2,092		40.1%
2010	2,326		11.2%
2020	2,682		15.3%
U.S. Decennial Census; 1850–1900 1910; 1920 1930 1940; 1950 1960 1970; 1980 1990 2000; 2010

=== Racial and ethnic composition ===
Waller city, Texas – Racial and ethnic composition Note: the US Census treats Hispanic/Latino as an ethnic category. This table excludes Latinos from the racial categories and assigns them to a separate category. Hispanics/Latinos may be of any race.
Race / Ethnicity (NH = Non-Hispanic)	Pop 2000	Pop 2010	Pop 2020	% 2000	% 2010	% 2020
White alone (NH)	1,185	1,170	1,133	56.64%	50.30%	42.24%
Black or African American alone (NH)	445	467	458	21.27%	20.08%	17.08%
Native American or Alaska Native alone (NH)	5	13	10	0.24%	0.56%	0.37%
Asian alone (NH)	18	20	19	0.86%	0.86%	0.71%
Native Hawaiian or Pacific Islander alone (NH)	0	0	0	0.00%	0.00%	0.00%
Other race alone (NH)	0	6	32	0.00%	0.26%	1.19%
Mixed race or Multiracial (NH)	17	32	81	0.81%	1.38%	3.02%
Hispanic or Latino (any race)	422	618	949	20.17%	26.57%	35.38%
Total	2,092	2,326	2,682	100.00%	100.00%	100.00%

=== 2020 census ===
As of the 2020 census, 2,682 people, 1,021 households, and 789 families resided in the city. The median age was 35.0 years; 27.0% of residents were under the age of 18 and 14.2% of residents were 65 years of age or older. For every 100 females there were 91.8 males, and for every 100 females age 18 and over there were 86.4 males age 18 and over.

0.0% of residents lived in urban areas, while 100.0% lived in rural areas.

There were 1,021 households in Waller, of which 39.4% had children under the age of 18 living in them. Of all households, 41.3% were married-couple households, 19.5% were households with a male householder and no spouse or partner present, and 35.7% were households with a female householder and no spouse or partner present. About 27.1% of all households were made up of individuals and 11.0% had someone living alone who was 65 years of age or older.

There were 1,120 housing units, of which 8.8% were vacant. The homeowner vacancy rate was 0.5% and the rental vacancy rate was 5.7%.

Racial composition as of the 2020 census
Race	Number	Percent
White	1,307	48.7%
Black or African American	475	17.7%
American Indian and Alaska Native	26	1.0%
Asian	22	0.8%
Native Hawaiian and Other Pacific Islander	0	0.0%
Some other race	484	18.0%
Two or more races	368	13.7%
Hispanic or Latino (of any race)	949	35.4%

=== 2010 census ===
As of the 2010 census, Waller had a population of 2,326.

=== 2000 census ===
At the census of 2000, 2,092 people, 768 households, and 530 families were residing in the city. The population density was 1,401.1 inhabitants per square mile (541.0/km^{2}). The 842 housing units averaged 563.9 units per square mile (217.7 units/km^{2}). The racial makeup of the city was 66.20% White, 21.70% African American, 0.29% Native American, 0.86% Asian, 9.89% from other races, and 1.05% from two or more races. Hispanics or Latinos of any race were 20.17% of the population.

Of its 768 households, 37.0% had children under 18 living with them, 50.0% were married couples living together, 14.2% had a female householder with no husband present, and 30.9% were not families. About 21.1% of all households were made up of individuals, and 7.9% had someone living alone who was 65 or older. The average household size was 2.72 and the average family size was 3.19.

In the city, the population was distributed as 28.9% under 18, 15.4% from 18 to 24, 28.5% from 25 to 44, 17.7% from 45 to 64, and 9.5% who were 65 or older. The median age was 29 years. For every 100 females, there were 98.1 males. For every 100 females age 18 and over, there were 94.5 males.

The median income for a household in the city was $33,162, and for a family was $42,569. Males had a median income of $30,337 versus $21,250 for females. The per capita income for the city was $14,860. About 14.3% of families and 18.3% of the population were below the poverty line, including 26.9% of those under age 18 and 11.3% of those age 65 or over.

== Media ==
The Waller Times, the only newspaper in Waller, is located at 2323 Main Street.

== Government and infrastructure ==
The current mayor of Waller is Danny L. Marburger; he has actively served for 33 years

The United States Postal Service Waller Post Office is located at 40090 U.S. Route 290 Business.

== Education ==
Waller is served by the Waller Independent School District. The Waller city limits includes several schools.

- I. T. Holleman Elementary School is located in the Waller city limits. The boundary of Jones Elementary School in Prairie View extends into the Waller townsite. Areas in the Waller extraterritorial jurisdiction extend into the zones for Fields Store Elementary School and Turlington Elementary School.
- Waller Junior High School is in the city limits. Areas in the Waller ETJ extend into the zone for W.C. Schultz Junior High School.
- All of Waller ISD is assigned to Waller High School (unincorporated Harris County).

Blinn College is the designated community college for residents of the Waller Independent School District, and all residents of Waller County. Blinn operates the Waller-Harris County Campus, using Schultz Junior High as the venue to offer classes; this began in 2023.

Melanee Smith Memorial Library is the public library for Waller. There is a proposed addition for an attached museum.

== Transportation ==
Skydive Houston Airport is located south of Waller in unincorporated Waller County.

== Notable people ==
- A. J. Foyt, auto racing driver
- Gabe Hall, American college football defensive tackle for the Baylor Bears
- Daniel Johnston, musician, lived here until his death on September 11, 2019
- Bomani Jones, sports journalist at ESPN
- Amy Adams Strunk, owner of the Tennessee Titans

== See also ==
- List of municipalities in Texas
