= Waller County, Texas =

County in Texas, United States

- County
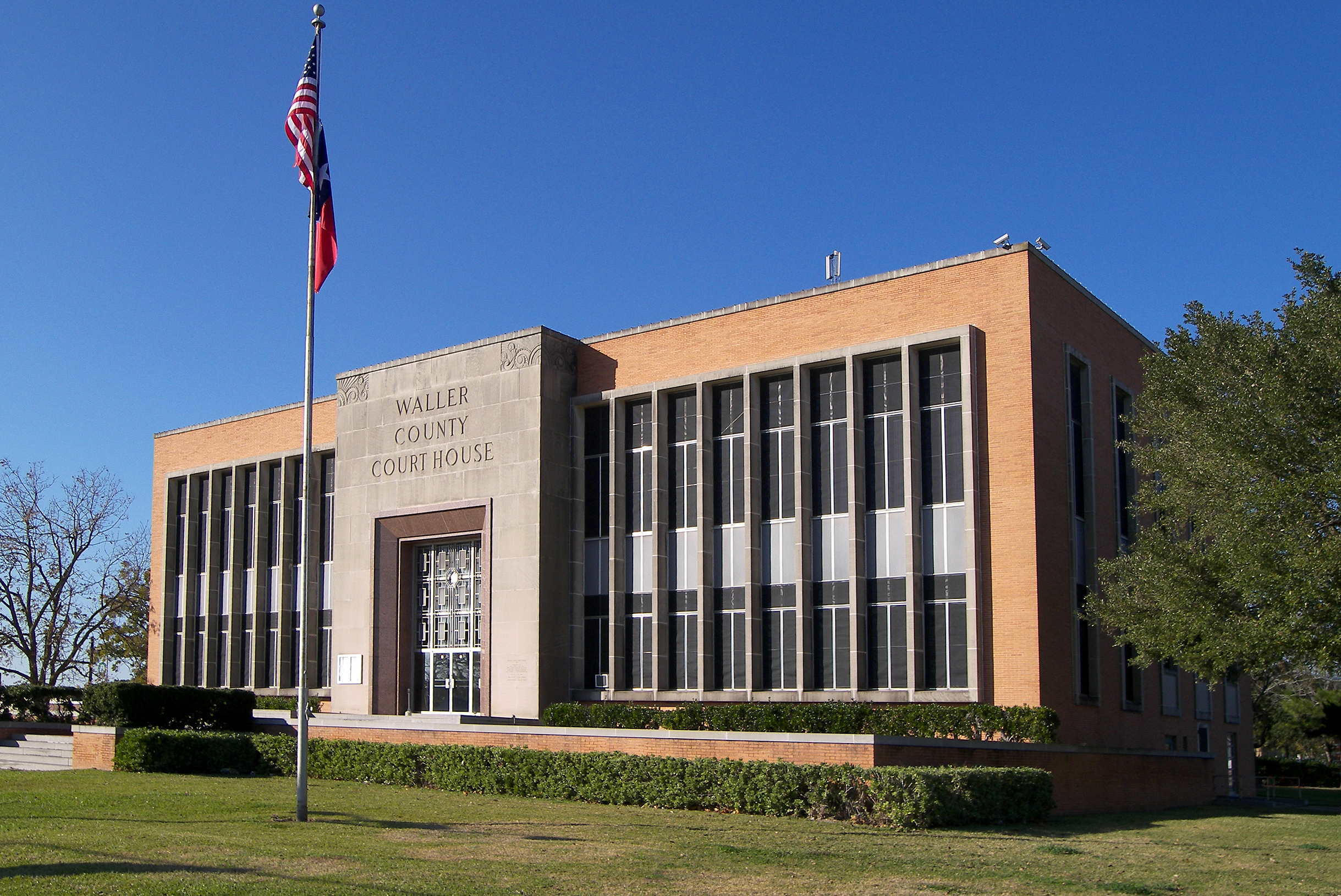
- The Waller County Courthouse in Hempstead

- Location within the U.S. state of Texas
- Coordinates: 30°01′N 95°59′W
- Country: United States
- State: Texas
- Founded: 1873
- Named for: Edwin Waller
- Seat: Hempstead
- Largest city: Prairie View

Area
  - Total: 518 sq mi (1,340 km^{2})
  - Land: 513 sq mi (1,330 km^{2})
  - Water: 4.4 sq mi (11 km^{2}) 0.8%

Population (2020)
  - Total: 56,794
  - Estimate (2025): 69,858 ▲
  - Density: 111/sq mi (42.7/km^{2})
- Time zone: UTC−6 (Central)
  - Summer (DST): UTC−5 (CDT)
- Congressional district: 10th
- Website: www.co.waller.tx.us

Waller County is a county in the U.S. state of Texas. As of the 2020 census, its population was 56,794. Its county seat is Hempstead. The county was named for Edwin Waller, a signer of the Texas Declaration of Independence and first mayor of Austin.

Waller County is included in the Houston–Pasadena–The Woodlands metropolitan statistical area. It is home of the Prairie View A&M University.

== Geography ==
According to the U.S. Census Bureau, the county has a total area of 518 square miles (1,340 km^{2}), of which 4.4 square miles (11 km^{2}) (0.8%) are covered by water.

=== Adjacent counties ===
- Grimes County (north)
- Montgomery County (northeast)
- Harris County (east)
- Fort Bend County (south)
- Austin County (west)
- Washington County (northwest)

== Communities ==
=== Cities ===
- Brookshire
- Hempstead (county seat)
- Katy (partly in Harris and Fort Bend Counties)
- Pattison
- Prairie View
- Waller (partly in Harris County)

=== Town ===
- Pine Island

=== Unincorporated areas ===
- Fields Store
- Monaville
- Second Corinth
- Shiloh
- Sunny Side

== Demographics ==
Historical population
| Census | Pop. | Note | %± |
|---|---|---|---|
| 1880 | 9,024 | | — |
| 1890 | 10,888 | | 20.7% |
| 1900 | 14,246 | | 30.8% |
| 1910 | 12,138 | | −14.8% |
| 1920 | 10,292 | | −15.2% |
| 1930 | 10,014 | | −2.7% |
| 1940 | 10,280 | | 2.7% |
| 1950 | 11,961 | | 16.4% |
| 1960 | 12,071 | | 0.9% |
| 1970 | 14,285 | | 18.3% |
| 1980 | 19,798 | | 38.6% |
| 1990 | 23,390 | | 18.1% |
| 2000 | 32,663 | | 39.6% |
| 2010 | 43,205 | | 32.3% |
| 2020 | 56,794 | | 31.5% |
| 2025 (est.) | 69,858 | ▲ | 23.0% |
U.S. Decennial Census; 1850–2010 2010–2020

=== Racial and ethnic composition ===
Waller County, Texas – Racial and ethnic composition Note: the US Census treats Hispanic/Latino as an ethnic category. This table excludes Latinos from the racial categories and assigns them to a separate category. Hispanics/Latinos may be of any race.
| Race / Ethnicity (NH = Non-Hispanic) | Pop 1980 | Pop 1990 | Pop 2000 | Pop 2010 | Pop 2020 | % 1980 | % 1990 | % 2000 | % 2010 | % 2020 |
|---|---|---|---|---|---|---|---|---|---|---|
| White alone (NH) | 10,285 | 11,956 | 16,289 | 19,260 | 23,494 | 51.95% | 51.12% | 49.87% | 44.58% | 41.37% |
| Black or African American alone (NH) | 8,240 | 8,738 | 9,496 | 10,537 | 12,104 | 41.62% | 37.36% | 29.07% | 24.39% | 21.31% |
| Native American or Alaska Native alone (NH) | 19 | 20 | 88 | 141 | 210 | 0.10% | 0.09% | 0.27% | 0.33% | 0.37% |
| Asian alone (NH) | 41 | 66 | 121 | 213 | 785 | 0.21% | 0.28% | 0.37% | 0.49% | 1.38% |
| Native Hawaiian or Pacific Islander alone (NH) | x | x | 3 | 9 | 10 | x | x | 0.01% | 0.02% | 0.02% |
| Other race alone (NH) | 64 | 18 | 26 | 54 | 314 | 0.32% | 0.08% | 0.08% | 0.12% | 0.55% |
| Mixed race or Multiracial (NH) | x | x | 296 | 455 | 1,391 | x | x | 0.91% | 1.05% | 2.45% |
| Hispanic or Latino (any race) | 1,149 | 2,592 | 6,344 | 12,536 | 18,486 | 5.80% | 11.08% | 19.42% | 29.02% | 32.55% |
| Total | 19,798 | 23,390 | 32,663 | 43,205 | 56,794 | 100.00% | 100.00% | 100.00% | 100.00% | 100.00% |

=== 2020 census ===
As of the 2020 census, the county had a population of 56,794. The median age was 33.0 years. 23.9% of residents were under the age of 18 and 12.9% of residents were 65 years of age or older. For every 100 females there were 92.1 males, and for every 100 females age 18 and over there were 89.5 males age 18 and over.

The racial makeup of the county was 46.6% White, 21.6% Black or African American, 1.1% American Indian and Alaska Native, 1.4% Asian, <0.1% Native Hawaiian and Pacific Islander, 16.3% from some other race, and 12.9% from two or more races. Hispanic or Latino residents of any race comprised 32.5% of the population.

22.6% of residents lived in urban areas, while 77.4% lived in rural areas.

There were 17,298 households in the county, of which 39.5% had children under the age of 18 living in them. Of all households, 57.0% were married-couple households, 16.7% were households with a male householder and no spouse or partner present, and 21.8% were households with a female householder and no spouse or partner present. About 19.4% of all households were made up of individuals and 8.4% had someone living alone who was 65 years of age or older.

There were 19,522 housing units, of which 11.4% were vacant. Among occupied housing units, 75.1% were owner-occupied and 24.9% were renter-occupied. The homeowner vacancy rate was 1.9% and the rental vacancy rate was 13.3%.

=== 2000 census ===
As of the 2000 census, 32,663 people, 10,557 households, and 7,748 families resided in the county. The population density was 64 people per square mile (25 people/km^{2}). The 11,955 housing units averaged 23 units per square mile (8.9 units/km^{2}). The racial makeup of the county was 57.83% White, 29.25% Black or African American, 0.49% Native American, 0.38% Asian, 0.02% Pacific Islander, 10.28% from other races, and 1.76% from two or more races. About 19.42% of the population was Hispanic or Latino of any race.

Of the 10,557 households, 35.1% had children under 18 living with them, 55.7% were married couples living together, 13.0% had a female householder with no husband present, and 26.6% were not families. About 21.0% of all households were made up of individuals, and 7.5% had someone living alone who was 65 or older. The average household size was 2.79, and the average family size was 3.25.

In the county, the population was distributed as 25.70% under 18, 18.10% from 18 to 24, 26.40% from 25 to 44, 20.50% from 45 to 64, and 9.40% who were 65 or older. The median age was 30 years. For every 100 females, there were 98.70 males. For every 100 females 18, and over, there were 96.10 males.

The median income for a household in the county was $38,136, and for a family was $45,868. Males had a median income of $34,447 versus $25,583 for females. The per capita income for the county was $16,338. About 11.50% of families and 16.00% of the population were below the poverty line, including 20.00% of those under age 18 and 12.30% of those age 65 or over.

== Economy ==
Igloo Corporation, a manufacturer of cooling and portable refrigeration products, is headquartered in unincorporated Waller County between Brookshire and Katy. In 2004, Igloo announced that it was consolidating its corporate, distribution, and manufacturing operations in Waller County.

Goya Foods has its Texas offices in an unincorporated area of the county near Brookshire.

== Politics and government ==
United States presidential election results for Waller County, Texas
| Year | Republican | | Democratic | | Third party(ies) | |
| Year | No. | % | No. | % | No. | % |
|---|---|---|---|---|---|---|
| 1912 | 144 | 16.78% | 594 | 69.23% | 120 | 13.99% |
| 1916 | 182 | 22.03% | 636 | 77.00% | 8 | 0.97% |
| 1920 | 167 | 13.36% | 674 | 53.92% | 409 | 32.72% |
| 1924 | 203 | 13.89% | 1,239 | 84.80% | 19 | 1.30% |
| 1928 | 376 | 42.68% | 504 | 57.21% | 1 | 0.11% |
| 1932 | 89 | 6.94% | 1,192 | 92.91% | 2 | 0.16% |
| 1936 | 111 | 11.08% | 889 | 88.72% | 2 | 0.20% |
| 1940 | 300 | 21.96% | 1,065 | 77.96% | 1 | 0.07% |
| 1944 | 190 | 13.23% | 1,007 | 70.13% | 239 | 16.64% |
| 1948 | 448 | 27.42% | 812 | 49.69% | 374 | 22.89% |
| 1952 | 1,487 | 54.01% | 1,264 | 45.91% | 2 | 0.07% |
| 1956 | 1,426 | 59.49% | 929 | 38.76% | 42 | 1.75% |
| 1960 | 1,115 | 49.18% | 1,101 | 48.57% | 51 | 2.25% |
| 1964 | 980 | 31.12% | 2,167 | 68.82% | 2 | 0.06% |
| 1968 | 958 | 27.86% | 1,684 | 48.97% | 797 | 23.18% |
| 1972 | 2,263 | 58.95% | 1,538 | 40.06% | 38 | 0.99% |
| 1976 | 1,992 | 40.97% | 2,828 | 58.17% | 42 | 0.86% |
| 1980 | 3,019 | 46.71% | 3,329 | 51.51% | 115 | 1.78% |
| 1984 | 4,116 | 51.69% | 3,828 | 48.07% | 19 | 0.24% |
| 1988 | 3,607 | 47.31% | 3,957 | 51.90% | 60 | 0.79% |
| 1992 | 3,065 | 33.84% | 4,270 | 47.14% | 1,723 | 19.02% |
| 1996 | 3,559 | 41.28% | 4,535 | 52.60% | 528 | 6.12% |
| 2000 | 5,686 | 52.37% | 5,046 | 46.47% | 126 | 1.16% |
| 2004 | 7,679 | 55.32% | 6,145 | 44.27% | 57 | 0.41% |
| 2008 | 8,265 | 53.30% | 7,153 | 46.12% | 90 | 0.58% |
| 2012 | 9,244 | 58.13% | 6,514 | 40.96% | 144 | 0.91% |
| 2016 | 10,531 | 62.74% | 5,748 | 34.25% | 505 | 3.01% |
| 2020 | 14,260 | 62.73% | 8,191 | 36.03% | 283 | 1.24% |
| 2024 | 17,077 | 61.96% | 10,183 | 36.95% | 301 | 1.09% |

United States Senate election results for Waller County, Texas1
| Year | Republican | | Democratic | | Third party(ies) | |
| Year | No. | % | No. | % | No. | % |
|---|---|---|---|---|---|---|
| 2024 | 16,385 | 59.71% | 10,432 | 38.01% | 625 | 2.28% |

United States Senate election results for Waller County, Texas2
| Year | Republican | | Democratic | | Third party(ies) | |
| Year | No. | % | No. | % | No. | % |
|---|---|---|---|---|---|---|
| 2020 | 14,219 | 63.31% | 7,725 | 34.40% | 514 | 2.29% |
| 2026 | 11,868 | 49.97% | 11,431 | 48.13% | 452 | 1.90% |

Texas Gubernatorial election results for Waller County
| Year | Republican | | Democratic | | Third party(ies) | |
| Year | No. | % | No. | % | No. | % |
|---|---|---|---|---|---|---|
| 2022 | 11,381 | 68.13% | 5,100 | 30.53% | 223 | 1.34% |
| 2026 | 12,348 | 52.00% | 11,045 | 46.51% | 355 | 1.49% |

=== United States Congress ===
| Senators | Name | Party | First Elected | Level |
|---|---|---|---|---|
| Senate Class 1 | John Cornyn | Republican | 2002 | Senior Senator |
| Senate Class 2 | Ted Cruz | Republican | 2012 | Junior Senator |
| Representatives | Name | Party | First Elected | Area(s) of Waller County Represented |
| District 10 | Michael McCaul | Republican | 2004 | Entire county |

=== Texas Legislature ===
==== Texas Senate ====
District 18: Lois Kolkhorst (R)- first elected in 2014.

==== Texas House of Representatives ====
District 3: Cecil Bell, Jr. (R)- first elected in 2013.

=== Voting controversies ===
A history of controversies exists regarding the reluctance of county officials to allow students attending historically black Prairie View A&M University to vote in Waller County.

As reported by the US District Court (Southern District of Texas, Corpus Christi Division) in Veasey v Perry, October 2014 (CIVIL ACTION NO. 13-CV-00193), pp 6–7 verbatim:

- In 1971, after the 26th Amendment extended the vote to those 18 years old and older, Waller County, which was home to Prairie View A&M University (PVAMU), a historically Black university, became troubled with race issues. Waller County's tax assessor and voter registrar prohibited students from voting unless they or their families owned property in the county. This practice was ended by a three-judge court in 1979.
- In 1992, a county prosecutor indicted PVAMU students for illegally voting, but dropped the charges after receiving a protest from the DOJ.
- In 2003, a PVAMU student ran for the commissioner's court. The local district attorney and county attorney threatened to prosecute students for voter fraud—for not meeting the old domicile test. These threatened prosecutions were enjoined, but Waller County then reduced early voting hours, which was particularly harmful to students because the election day was during their spring break. After the NAACP filed suit, Waller County reversed the changes to early voting and the student narrowly won the election.
- In 2007–08, during then Senator Barack Obama's campaign for president, Waller County made a number of voting changes without seeking clearance. The county rejected "incomplete" voter registrations and required volunteer deputy registrars (VDRs) to personally find and notify the voters of the rejection. The county also limited the number of new registrations any VDR could submit, thus limiting the success of voter registration drives. These practices were eventually prohibited by a consent decree.

In 2018, the NAACP Legal Defense Fund filed a lawsuit in U.S. district court, alleging that the county's early-voting plan unduly limits early voting opportunities for students at Prairie View A&M. On October 10, Jacob Aronowitz, a field director for Democratic U.S. House candidate Mike Siegel, delivered a letter from Siegel, which indicated a solution to attempts to keep students at Prairie View A&M University from voting, to a clerk on the county executive's staff. As a result, Aronowitz was arrested for what he was told was "48 hour investigative detention."

=== Law enforcement ===
As of 2021 the current sheriff is Troy Guidry, who was elected in 2020. The previous sheriff was Glenn Smith, who had been sheriff since 2008. Smith was previously chief of the police department of Hempstead, where he had been fired by the town council after allegations that he and four white officers had exhibited racism and police brutality during the arrest of a 35-year-old black man.

In November 2021, a 16 year old was charged with six counts of aggravated assault for crashing into six people on bicycles while attempting to roll coal. All four of the riders were hospitalized for their injuries, two of them being airlifted. According to attorneys hired by the injured, the injuries included "broken vertebrae, cervical and lumbar spinal injuries, broken collar bones, hands, and wrists [requiring surgical intervention], multiple traumatic brain injuries, lacerations, soft tissue damage, road rash, and extensive bruising" The Waller county district attorney, Elton Mathis, released a statement about the handling of the case by the Waller Police Department in which he said "This case was not handled appropriately by the investigating agency. PERIOD." According to his statement, the Texas Department of Public Safety urged the local police to treat the scene as a crime scene, and to contact the district attorney's office. Despite this, the local police released the 16 year old without doing an investigation.

== Education ==
School districts serving Waller County include:

- Hempstead Independent School District
- Royal Independent School District
- Katy Independent School District (portions of the district are in other counties)
- Waller Independent School District (portions of the district are in other counties)

Brazos Valley Sudbury School was previously in operation in Waller County.

Blinn College is the designated community college for all of the county. Additionally, areas within Katy ISD are designated as the zone for Houston Community College.

Prairie View A&M University is the only university located within the county.

== Media ==
The Waller Times publishes local community news, school news, and sports news weekly on Mondays. It was founded in 1991 and is still family owned and operated.

== Transportation ==
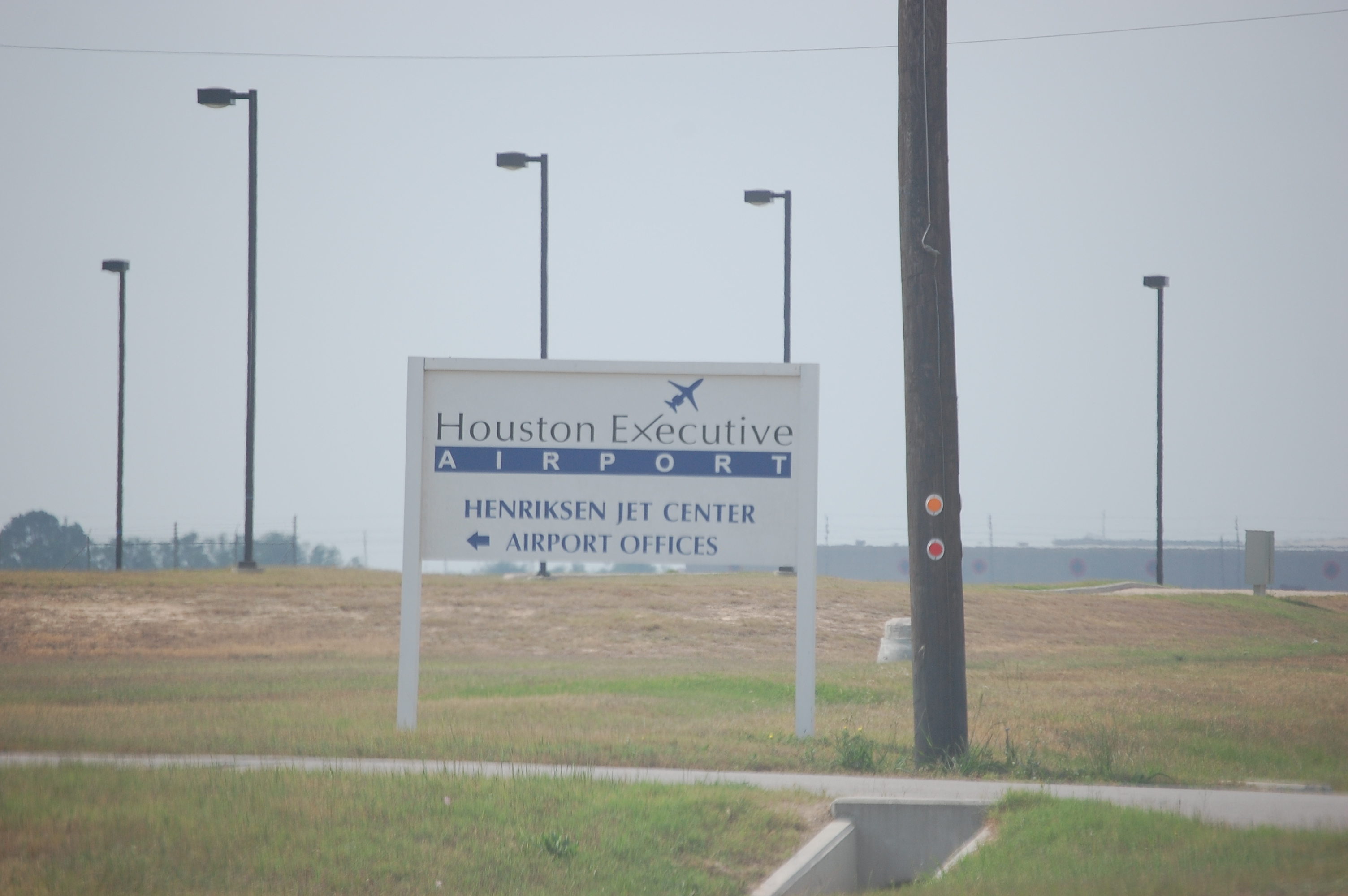
Houston Executive Airport

=== Major highways ===
- Interstate 10
- U.S. Highway 90
- U.S. Highway 290
- State Highway 6
- State Highway 159

The TTC-69 component (recommended preferred) of the once-planned Trans-Texas Corridor went through Waller County.

=== Airports ===
Houston Executive Airport is located between Brookshire and Katy in an unincorporated area. Skydive Houston Airport (Skylake Airport) is located south of Waller in an unincorporated area.

The Houston Airport System stated that Waller County is within the primary service area of George Bush Intercontinental Airport, an international airport in Houston in Harris County. In addition William P. Hobby Airport in Houston and in Harris County has commercial airline service.

== See also ==
- List of museums in the Texas Gulf Coast
- National Register of Historic Places listings in Waller County, Texas
- Recorded Texas Historic Landmarks in Waller County
- Death of Sandra Bland
