= Blinn College =

Junior college in Brenham, Texas, U.S.

- Type: Public Junior college
- Established: 1884
- Accreditation: SACS
- Chancellor: Mary Hensley
- Students: 18,301 (Fall 2023)
- Location: Brenham, Texas, United States; 30°9′35″N 96°24′26″W
- Colors: Blue and white
- Nickname: Buccaneers
- Website: www.blinn.edu
- Blinn College Historic District
- U.S. National Register of Historic Places
- U.S. Historic district
- Location within Texas Location within the United States
- Location: Roughly bounded by Third, Jackson, Fifth, Green, College, and High, Brenham, Texas
- Area: 16 acres (6.5 ha)
- Built: c. 1840
- Architect: Multiple
- Architectural style: Late 19th and 20th Century Revivals, Early 20th Century Movements
- MPS: Brenham MPS
- NRHP reference No.: 90000446
- Added to NRHP: March 29, 1990

Blinn College is a public junior college in Brenham, Texas, with additional campuses in Bryan, Schulenburg, Sealy, and Waller. Brenham is Blinn's original and main campus, with housing and athletics.

== History ==
- Main Building, Blinn College
- U.S. National Register of Historic Places
- U.S. Historic district – Contributing property
- Recorded Texas Historic Landmark
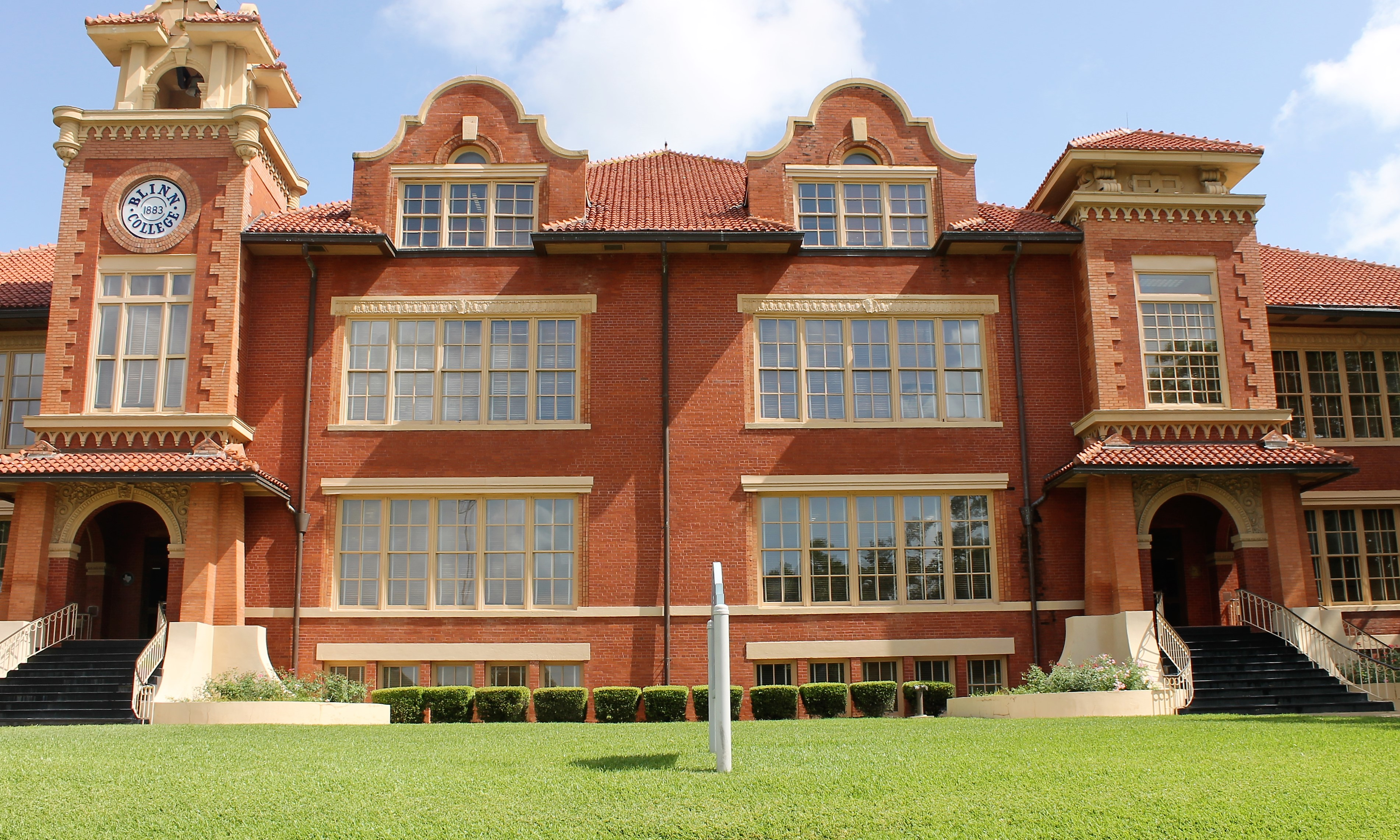
- Main Building in 2016
- Location: 804 College Ave., Brenham, Texas
- Coordinates: 30°09′35″N 96°24′19″W
- Area: 1 acre (0.40 ha)
- Built: 1906
- Built by: C.W. Raper
- Architect: Charles H. Page
- Architectural style: Spanish Revival, Texas Commercial
- Part of: Blinn College Historic District (ID90000446)
- NRHP reference No.: 78002998
- RTHL No.: 8303

Significant dates
- Added to NRHP: December 6, 1978
- Designated CP: March 29, 1990
- Designated RTHL: 1962

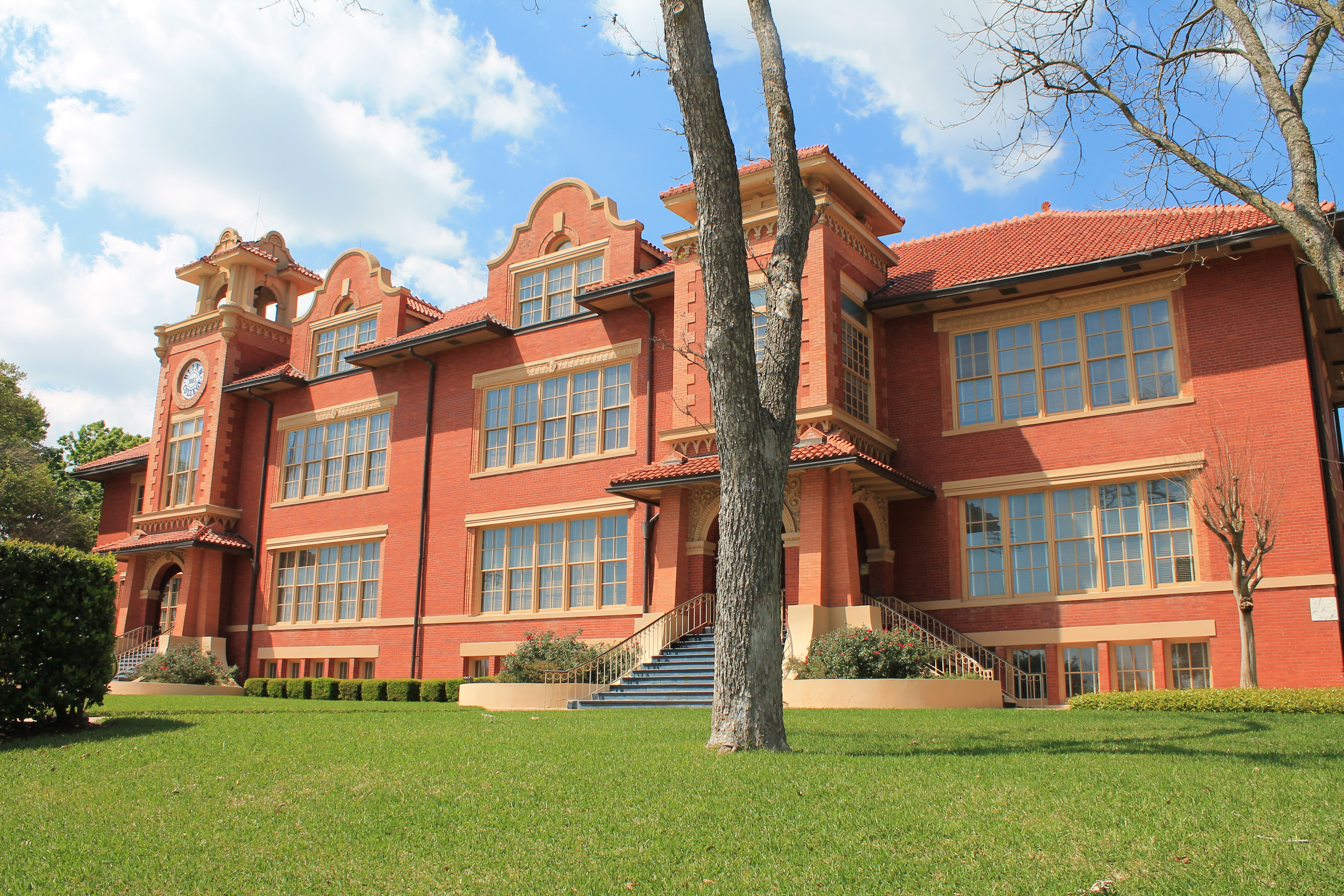
Old Main

Blinn was founded in 1883 as Mission Institute by local minister Carl Urbantke with an original class of three ministerial students. It was affiliated with the Southern German Conference of the Methodist Episcopal Church, and became coeducational in 1888. In 1889, the institute's name was changed to Blinn Memorial College in honor of the Reverend Christian Blinn, who had donated a considerable sum of money to make the school possible. Blinn was a wealthy minister and immigrant from Germany, who funded several German Methodist efforts, including the building of the Blinn Memorial Methodist Episcopal Church in New York City.

In 1927, the board of trustees, under leadership of President Philip Deschner, organized a junior college. In 1930, Blinn merged with Southwestern University of Georgetown. In 1934, a new charter was procured by the citizens of Brenham, and a private, nonsectarian junior college was organized as Blinn College, with nine regents as the board of control. In February 1937, all connections with Southwestern University and the Methodist denominations were severed.

On June 8, 1937, voters in Washington County levied a property tax for the creation of a public junior college district. Blinn thus became the first county-owned junior college district in Texas. The college continues to operate as one of the largest of some 50 public community college districts in Texas. After some early struggles (including the campus nearly closing in 1946 due to fiscal issues), the college began to grow and do well under the leadership of Dr. Thomas Morris Spencer, one of the early public junior college pioneers in Texas. When he left the college in 1957, it was on a firm fiscal footing.

=== Campuses ===
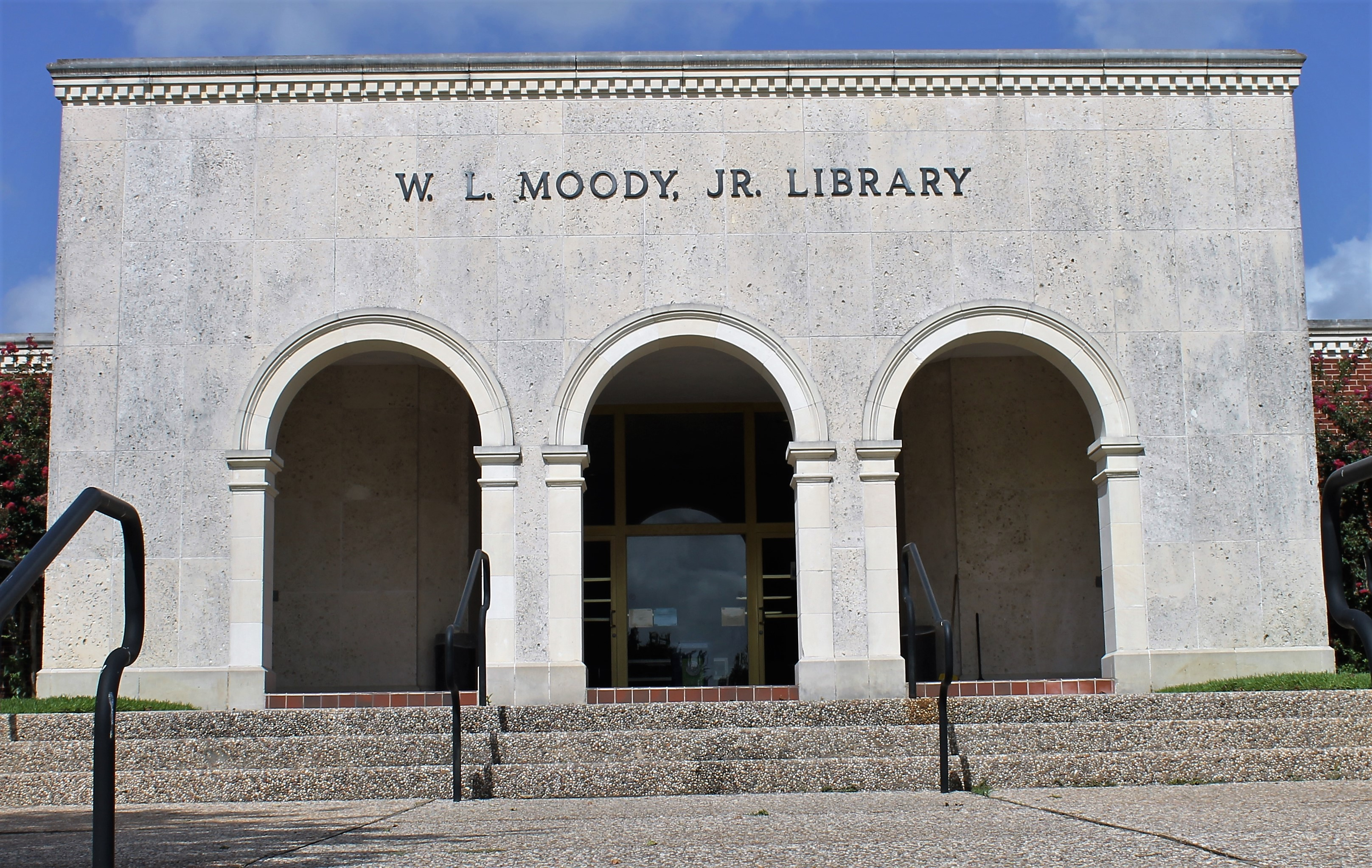
The W. L. Moody, Jr. Library in Brenham

Blinn has six campuses in Brenham, Bryan (Villa Maria Road), RELLIS (SH 47 in Bryan, shared with Texas A&M University), Schulenberg, Sealy, and Waller.

The Bryan campus was established in 1970, and by the early 1980s, a third campus opened in College Station. In 1997, the Villa Maria Road campus opened in Bryan, consolidating the programs that were located in the Townshire Shopping Center in Bryan and the Woodstone Center in College Station. The third Brazos County site, located in the former Bryan post office, continues to house the dental hygiene, radiologic technology, and workforce education programs. The original three buildings on the Bryan campuses were expanded to six, and in 2002, the former Schulman Theater was purchased and converted to classroom space, known as the College Park Campus (CPC). The Schulenburg campus opened in 1997 and the Sealy campus opened in 2005.

In 2015, Blinn announced that it would cancel expansion plans at the Villa Maria campus and open new facilities at the Texas A&M RELLIS Campus, instead. The groundbreaking ceremony for the Blinn College educational building took place on March 31, 2017. In 2022, Blinn opened a new $32 million administration building at RELLIS, incorporating 19 new classrooms in addition to offices for student enrollment.

In 2023, Blinn opened the Waller campus in the former Waller High School.

== Service area ==
The Texas Legislature defined the service area of the college as:

- All of the following counties: Brazos, Burleson, Grimes, Madison, Waller, and Washington
- Austin County, except for areas in Brazos ISD (legislation uses "Wallis-Orchard", the district's former name)
- Fayette County, except for areas in Smithville ISD
- Lee County, except for areas in Elgin ISD
- Portions of Bastrop County within Lexington ISD
- Portions of Harris County within Waller ISD
- Portions of Milam County within Gause ISD, Lexington ISD, and Milano ISD
- Portions of Montgomery County within Richards ISD
- Portions of Robertson County within Bryan ISD, Franklin ISD, Hearne ISD, and Mumford ISD
- Portions of Walker County within Richards ISD
- Portions of Williamson County within Lexington ISD

Of those areas, the only portion within the college's taxation area, which means the only portion eligible for in-district tuition, is Washington County.

== Academics ==
Blinn offers more than 150 degree and certificate programs. The college is accredited by the Southern Association of Colleges and Schools to award associate's degrees.

=== Transfer ===
Blinn has the highest transfer rate in Texas, sending students to institutions such as Texas A&M University, Sam Houston State University, Texas State University, the University of Texas, and the University of Houston. Its transfer rate to four-year universities is 49% compared to the state average of 27%. Blinn transfers more students to Texas A&M University than any other two-year college. Blinn technical students score among the best in the state on board and licensure exams.

In 2001, Blinn and Texas A&M University established the first co-enrollment program of its kind with the Transfer Enrollment at Texas A&M (TEAM) Program. TEAM students enroll in one or two A&M courses at a time, while taking the rest of their courses at Blinn. After 60 credit hours and meeting academic standards, students are guaranteed transfer to A&M, with the opportunity to transfer before 60 credits/2 years. In 2013, the program was awarded the Texas Higher Education Coordinating Board's Recognition of Excellence, and in 2014 it received the THECB Star Award.

== Student profile ==
Student body composition as of Fall 2021
Race and ethnicity	Total
White	58%
Hispanic	25%
Black	7%
Other (Note: Other consists of Multiracial Americans and those who prefer to not say)	6%
Asian	3%
Nonresident alien	1%
Economic diversity
Low-income (Note: The percentage of students who received an income-based federal Pell grant intended for low-income students.)	79%
Affluent (Note: The percentage of students who are a part of the American middle class at the bare minimum.)	21%

For fall 2021, the college district enrolled 8,779 full-time and 17,909 total students. The student body was 49% male and 51% female. The largest program was Liberal Arts, followed by Agriculture then Nursing, all associates degrees.

== Community impact ==
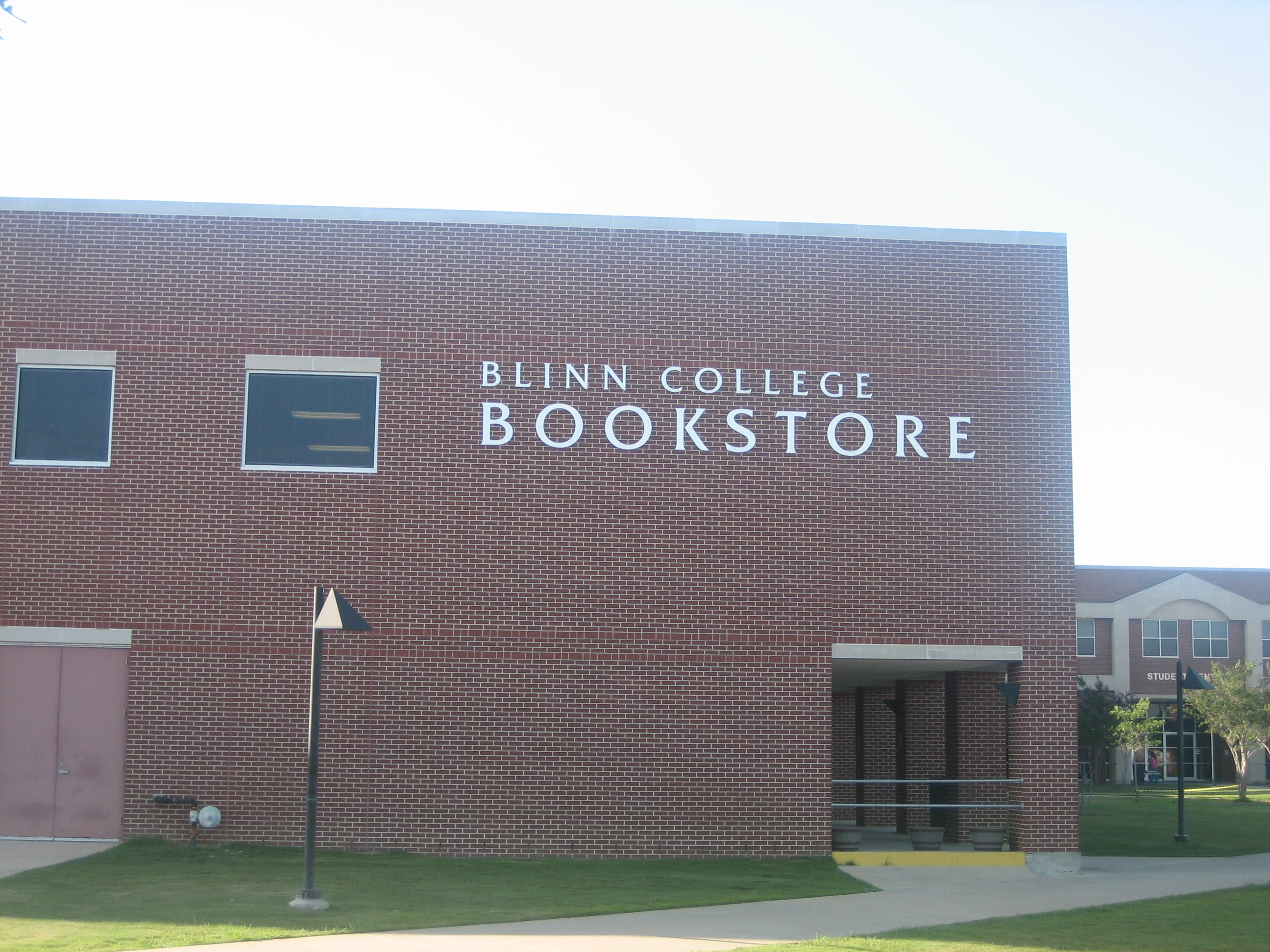
Blinn College Bryan campus bookstore.

Economic Modeling Specialists International (EMSI) conducted a 2014 study which concluded that Blinn made a $345.3 million impact in its service area, including $239.5 million in added income by former students employed in the regional workforce, $61.3 million in College operations spending and $44.5 million in student spending. The report found that Blinn has made an impact of $247.4 million in Bryan-College Station, $83 million in Brenham, $11.1 million in Schulenburg and $3.9 million in Sealy.

Blinn has also been recognized for its community service. In 2011, Blinn received the Carnegie Foundation for the Advancement of Teaching Community Engagement Classification, and in 2012 it was the only community college in the state of Texas to be named to the President's Higher Education Community Service Honor Roll. Each year, Blinn devotes a day to community service, called the Blinn Blitz, and hundreds of students participate in local community service projects.

== Athletics ==
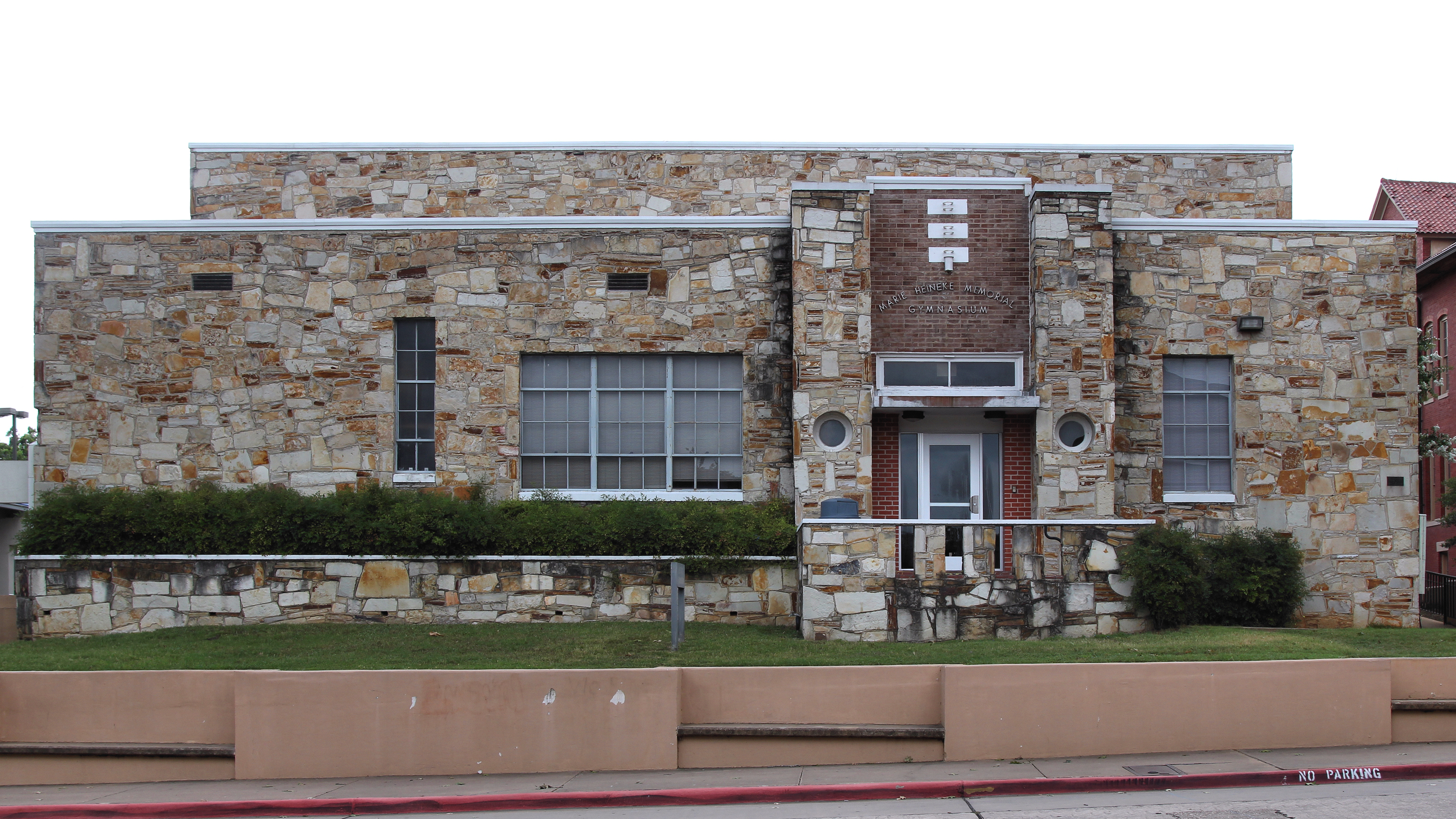
The stone Marie Heineke Memorial Gym is a product of the Work Projects Administration.

The home campus in Brenham has offered intercollegiate athletics since 1903 and has won 50 national championships since 1987. The Blinn Buccaneers compete in football, men's and women's basketball, baseball, softball, volleyball, men's and women's soccer, men's and women's golf, men's and women's cross country, cheerleading, and dance. The Division I football program is tied for the fourth most NJCAA national championships, with wins in 1995, 1996, 2006, and 2009. The last of which was won with Cam Newton. The volleyball team won the NJCAA championship in 2008, 2011, 2013 and 2014. The baseball team captured its first national championship in 2024. The softball team consistently makes the national tournament. Blinn's award-winning cheer and dance teams have won 18 combined NJCAA, NCA, and NDA National Championships since 2014.

== Notable alumni ==
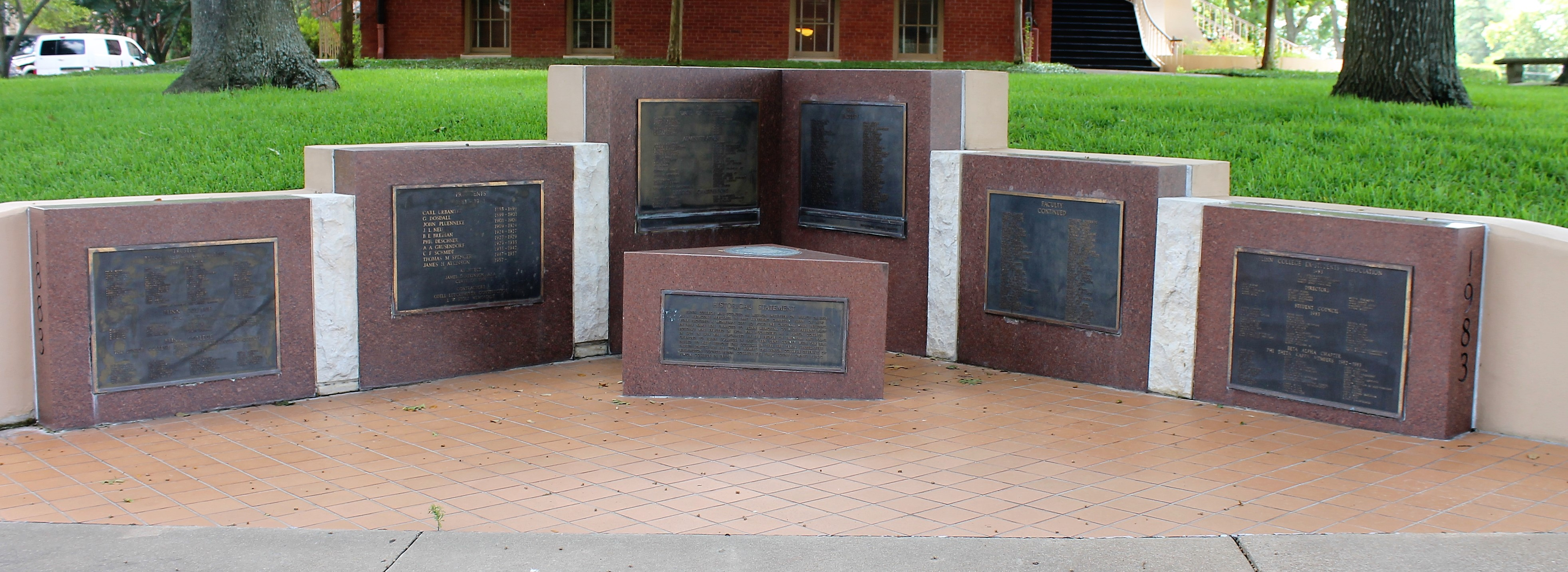
Cornerstone plaques commemorate people from Blinn's history

=== Inventor ===
- Abraham Louis Levin (Class of 1903), physician and inventor of the Levin Tube

=== Politicians ===
- Dan Kubiak (Class of 1959), State representative from Rockdale, 1969-1983 and 1991-1998
- Leon Toubin, member of Blinn College's board of trustees

=== Pop culture ===
- Big Pokey, rapper
- Ty Hardin, actor
- Henry Thomas, actor

=== Athletes ===
==== Baseball ====
- Don Baylor
- Josh Beckett
- Chris James
- Bryce Miller

==== Basketball ====
- Chris "Birdman" Andersen
- Oliver Lafayette
- Tony Skinn

==== Football ====
- Josh Ashton
- John Baker
- Michael Bishop
- Lyle Blackwood
- Chris Brazzell
- Eric Brown
- Shockmain Davis
- Tim Denton
- Danny Gray
- Mike Green
- Roderick Green
- Marion Grice
- Xavier Hutchinson
- Chris Johnson
- James Johnson
- Quincy Morgan
- Shane Nelson
- Cam Newton
- Damion Ratley
- Khiry Robinson
- Bernard Scott
- Kendall Sheffield
- Vantz Singletary
- Justin Tuggle
- Dede Westbrook
- James Wright

==== Track and Field ====
- James Beckford, winner of the silver medal in long jump at the 2004 Olympics
- Tim Montgomery, Olympic sprinter
- Godfrey Siamusiye, distance runner

== See also ==
- National Register of Historic Places listings in Washington County, Texas
- Recorded Texas Historic Landmarks in Washington County
