= Monaville Independent School District =

School district in Texas, United States

Monaville Independent School District was a former school district in Waller County, Texas. It was established in 1930 as a consolidation of the Monaville School (Monaville Community School District or School District No. 13) and the nearby Sunnyside School along with other rural schools. The Bracy Island and Aurora areas had previously consolidated with Monaville. By 1953 the district was dissolved, with portions going to the Pattison Independent School District and the Hempstead Independent School District; the area rural population experienced a population decline beginning with the Great Depression.
