= Johnny Holland =

American football player and coach (born 1965)

San Francisco 49ers
- Title: Defensive run game coordinator

Personal information
- Born: March 11, 1965 (age 61); Bellville, Texas, U.S.
- Listed height: 6 ft 2 in (1.88 m)
- Listed weight: 221 lb (100 kg)

Career information
- Position: Linebacker (No. 50)
- High school: Hempstead (Hempstead, Texas)
- College: Texas A&M
- NFL draft: 1987: 2nd round, 41st overall pick

Career history

Playing
- Green Bay Packers (1987–1993)

Coaching
- Green Bay Packers (1995–1997) Defensive quality control; Green Bay Packers (1998) Special teams coach; Green Bay Packers (1999) Linebackers coach; Seattle Seahawks (2000) Assistant special teams/assistant strength and conditioning; Seattle Seahawks (2001–2002) Linebackers coach; Detroit Lions (2003–2004) Defensive assistant; Detroit Lions (2005) Linebackers coach; Houston Texans (2006–2010) Linebackers coach; Virginia Destroyers (2011) Linebackers coach; Oakland Raiders (2012) Linebackers coach; Saskatchewan Roughriders (2013) Linebackers coach; BC Lions (2014–2015) Linebackers coach; Cleveland Browns (2016) Inside linebackers coach; San Francisco 49ers (2017) Linebackers coach; San Francisco 49ers (2018–2020) Outside linebackers coach/run game specialist; San Francisco 49ers (2021–2025) Linebackers coach; San Francisco 49ers (2026–present) Defensive run game coordinator

Awards and highlights
- Super Bowl champion (XXXI); Green Bay Packers Hall of Fame (2001); Consensus All-American (1985); First-team All-SWC (1986); UFL champion (2011)

Career NFL statistics
- Games: 103
- Sacks: 3.5
- Interceptions: 9
- Stats at Pro Football Reference

Johnny Ray Holland (born March 11, 1965) is an American professional football coach and former linebacker who currently serves as the defensive run game coordinator for the San Francisco 49ers of the National Football League (NFL). Holland played in the NFL as a linebacker for the Green Bay Packers from 1987 to 1993. He was inducted into the Green Bay Packers Hall of Fame.

Holland played college football for the Texas A&M Aggies and was selected in the second round of the 1987 NFL draft. He won a Super Bowl with the Packers. He is also an inductee into the Texas A&M Hall of Fame and the Cotton Bowl Hall of Fame.

== Playing career ==
=== High school ===
Holland is a graduate of Hempstead High School in Hempstead, Texas. While attending Hempstead High, Holland was a letterman in several sports. He became an All-State player in both football and basketball, while simultaneously becoming a top-10 student. Holland is the first of only three Hempstead High School alumni to play in the NFL, the other being Harvey Williams and Tre Turner.

=== College ===
Prior to his professional football career, Holland was a four-year letterman at Texas A&M University in College Station, Texas. There, he was a three-year starter and was Texas A&M's all-time leading tackler until his record was broken in 1998 by Dat Nguyen.

=== NFL ===
Pre-draft measurables
Height	Weight	Arm length	Hand span	40-yard dash	10-yard split	20-yard split	20-yard shuttle	Vertical jump	Broad jump	Bench press
6 ft 1 3/4 in (1.87 m)	226 lb (103 kg)	33 in (0.84 m)	10 1/4 in (0.26 m)	4.76 s	1.64 s	2.75 s	4.36 s	33.5 in (0.85 m)	10 ft 4 in (3.15 m)	16 reps
All values from NFL Combine

Holland was a second-round draft pick (41st overall) for the Green Bay Packers in 1987. He posted over 100 tackles for six consecutive seasons while playing for Green Bay. He retired from play after the 1993 season. He was inducted into the Green Bay Packers Hall of Fame in 2001.

== Coaching career ==
After retiring as a linebacker for Green Bay, Holland moved on to an NFL coaching career, beginning as a defensive quality control coach for the Packers from 1995 to 1997. He went on to coach special teams in 1998 and linebackers in 1999. He helped to lead the Packers to back-to-back NFC championships following the 1996 and 1997 seasons and an NFL championship in Super Bowl XXXI.

In 2000, Holland moved on to the Seattle Seahawks, where he served as the assistant special teams and assistant strength and conditioning coach. He returned to his more familiar role as linebackers coach in 2001 and 2002. For the 2003 season, Holland moved to the Detroit Lions. In Detroit, he was defensive assistant coach from 2003 to 2004 and linebackers coach in 2005. Holland returned his home state of Texas in 2006. He was the linebackers coach for the Houston Texans until being fired in 2011.

In 2012, Holland was hired by new Raiders head coach Dennis Allen to coach the team's linebackers. On December 31, 2012, he was relieved of his duties. Holland joined the BC Lions of the Canadian Football League (CFL) as a linebackers coach on February 19, 2014, after 17 years of coaching in the NFL. He returned to the NFL in 2016 as linebackers coach of the Cleveland Browns under head coach Hue Jackson.

Holland began serving as the linebackers coach for the San Francisco 49ers in the 2017 season. On April 9, 2026, it was announced that Holland would become the team's defensive run game coordinator.

== Family ==
Holland is married to Faith Holland and is the father of Jordan Holland and Joli Holland.
