= Liendo Plantation =

Historic plantation in southeast Texas

- U.S. National Register of Historic Places
- Recorded Texas Historic Landmark
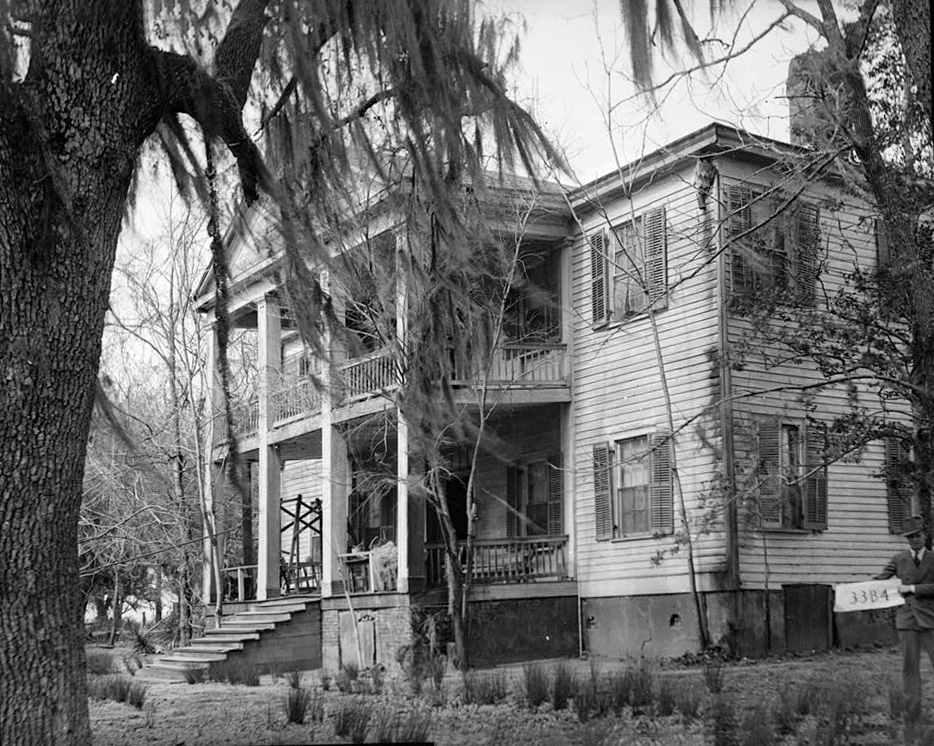
- HABS image of Liendo Plantation

- Location within Texas Location within the United States
- Nearest city: Hempstead, Texas
- Coordinates: 30°5′47″N 96°1′47″W
- Area: 9 acres (3.6 ha)
- Built: 1853
- Architect: Leonard W. Groce
- Architectural style: Greek Revival
- NRHP reference No.: 71000970
- RTHL No.: 9395

Significant dates
- Added to NRHP: June 21, 1971
- Designated RTHL: 1964

Liendo Plantation is a historic cotton plantation in Waller County, Texas, United States. Named after its original owner, José Justo Liendo, the plantation was purchased in 1873 by sculptor Elisabet Ney and her husband, physician Edmund Montgomery.

The plantation home was given a state historical marker in 1936, and the entire plantation was designated a Recorded Texas Historic Landmark in 1964. The site was added to the National Register of Historic Places on June 21, 1971.

== History ==
The land that is now Liendo Plantation was granted to José Justo Liendo in 1828, when the region was a part of Mexico. In 1841, Leonard Waller Groce purchased the plot, making the land into a working cotton plantation, adding a plantation house to the site in 1853. During the American Civil War, the Confederate States Army used the complex as "Camp Groce," first as a training camp and then as a military prison.

== The Civil War and aftermath ==
=== 1861–1862 ===
The Confederate Military Post of Hempstead was established in the Spring of 1861. Numerous camps of instruction were established east of town along Clear Creek. Camp Hebert was established on the eastern bank of Clear Creek and south of Washington Road. Camp Hebert was the earliest camp in the area and served as the headquarters of the Post of Hempstead early in the war.

Camp Groce CSA was established in the spring of 1862 on Liendo Plantation on the eastern bank of Clear Creek as a camp of instruction for Confederate infantry recruits. Originally named Camp Liendo, the name was changed to Camp Groce in honor of Leonard Waller Groce, the owner of Liendo Plantation and the enslaver of over 100 people. A contract to construct the barracks at Camps Groce and Hebert was let in February 1862. Numerous Confederate infantry regiments were organized, trained, and equipped at Camps Groce and Hebert. The camps were abandoned in the spring of 1862 due to their sickly locations. Camp Groce was reused as a military camp until the spring of 1863 but was again abandoned. From 1861 to 1863, nearly 200 Confederate soldiers fell sick at Camps Groce and Hebert and died. Many were taken to the Post Hospital in the Planter's Exchange Hotel located at the southwest corner of 12th and Wilkins Streets in downtown Hempstead. Many died in the hospital, and almost all of them were buried on McDade Plantation west of town, which became the hospital cemetery.

=== 1863 ===
In June 1863, the Confederate Army re-opened Camp Groce prison camp for US Army prisoners captured in the Battles of Galveston (January 1, 1863) and Sabine Pass I (January 21, 1863). The Confederacy also sent US prisoners of war taken at the Battle of Sabine Pass II (September 8, 1863) to Camp Groce. In 1863, the Confederate Army imprisoned 427 US prisoners of war. That year 21 prisoners died; most were buried northeast of the camp, where most still rest.

=== 1864 ===
In May 1864, the Confederacy re-opened Camp Groce to imprison 148 U.S. Army prisoners of war captured at the Battle of Calcasieu Pass, Louisiana. The prisoners included the crew of the USS Granite City and USS Wave, Tinclad #45, and 37 soldiers. The Confederate Army sent about 40 soldiers from the 1st Texas US Cavalry to Camp Groce in June 1864 and transferred 506 more US prisoners to Camp Groce from Camp Ford in August 1864. Yellow fever and other diseases affected the prisoners. They were moved to Camp Gillespie near Bellville in late September 1864 and then to Camp Felder, 6.5 miles north-northwest of Chappell Hill, Texas. 221 prisoners died or were missing from Camps Groce, Gillespie, and Felder in 1864. 444 were paroled in December 1864.

1863: 427 POWs, 21 died, 2 escaped 1864: 683 POWs, 147 died, 28 missing, 18 escaped, 13 deserted to the enemy, 14 status unknown, and 1 political prisoner held by CS authorities until released in May 1865.

Totals: 1,110 POWs held, 168 died, 28 missing, 20 escaped, 13 deserted to the enemy, 14 status unknown

At least 277 Confederate soldiers died or went missing in and around Hempstead, Texas, during the Civil War.

Most US and CS soldiers who died in and around Hempstead, Texas, during the Civil War are buried in the area. They are buried in 3 primary locations in and around Camp Groce and west of town on the old McDade Plantation Cemetery on Austin Branch Road near Sorsby Road. A Texas State Historical Marker is entitled "Union Army POW Cemetery". Still, numerous US Navy POWs were buried there, along with multiple Confederate soldiers who died in the hospitals in downtown Hempstead.

Recently, a Waller County Historical Marker was placed within the boundaries of Camp Groce. It is located east of FM 359, just south of Clear Creek. Entitled "Camp Groce Cemetery," the marker commemorates the deaths and burial location of US prisoners of war and Confederate soldiers who died and were buried within the boundaries of Camp Groce. Also, the Washington County Historical Commission has placed a Texas State Historical Marker, "Camp Felder", on the west side of FM 1155 north of Chappell Hill, Texas, to commemorate Camp Felder CSA.

=== 1865 ===
About 8,000 Confederate soldiers from Walker's Division (commanded by Maj. Gen. John H. Forney) were ordered to Hempstead from Louisiana in March 1865. Upon the arrival of the division on March 24–30, 1865, the division began waiting for Confederate President Jefferson Davis to arrive to make the Last Stand of the Confederacy at Hempstead, Texas. Lee surrendered on April 9, 1865, Johnston surrendered on April 26, 1865, and Davis was captured in Georgia on May 10, 1865, all of which compelled Confederate Maj. Gen. Kirby Smith to surrender the Department of the Trans-Mississippi on June 2, 1865. All Confederate forces in Hempstead and all other CS posts in Texas mostly went home. Immediately after the surrender of CS forces in Texas, it took about a month before US troops entered the state. The first US forces to arrive in Hempstead after the war was the 29th Illinois Volunteer Infantry Regiment. The 29th was relieved by the 37th Illinois Volunteer Infantry Regiment that garrisoned the US Post of Hempstead, Texas, well into 1866.

In August 1865, Maj. Gen. George A. Custer arrived in Hempstead with a division of volunteer US cavalry. The division camped in and around Liendo Plantation for about two months before moving to Austin or was mustered out of the service at Hempstead in 1865–66. The cavalry regiments under the command of Custer at Hempstead were the 1st Iowa, 2nd Wisconsin, 7th Indiana, and the 5th and 12th Illinois Cavalry. Company K of the 37th Illinois Volunteer Infantry occupied the town and guarded the railroad line until the regiment was mustered out in May 1866. The headquarters of the US Post of Hempstead was located in town and not at Liendo Plantation.

US Forces fanned out and set up camps in numerous towns. Their mission was to parole former Confederate troops, collect CS property, and establish law and order. However, many former CS troops did not report for their paroles and fled to Mexico. The volunteer US regiments stationed in Texas were nearly gone from the state by the end of 1865.

=== 1866–1869 ===
In 1866, the 1st Battalion, Companies A and B of the 17th US Infantry, was stationed at Hempstead. The battalion arrived for duty in Hempstead in the Fall of 1866. They set up camp north of the US Post Office in downtown Hempstead. Their mission was primarily in support of the Freedmen's Bureau. In the Fall of 1867, a yellow fever epidemic devastated the civilian population of Hempstead, and nearly 40 soldiers of the 17th US Infantry died as well.

On March 4, 1873, the plantation and home were purchased by German American sculptor Elisabet Ney and Scottish American physician and scientist Edmund Montgomery, a married couple moving to Texas from Georgia. Ney and Montgomery occupied the plantation from 1873 through Montgomery's death in 1911, though from 1892 Ney largely removed to Austin, Texas. Both are buried on the grounds.

== See also ==
- National Register of Historic Places listings in Waller County, Texas
- Recorded Texas Historic Landmarks in Waller County
