= National Register of Historic Places listings in Waller County, Texas =

Location of Waller County in Texas

This is a list of the National Register of Historic Places listings in Waller County, Texas.

This is intended to be a complete list of properties listed on the National Register of Historic Places in Waller County, Texas. There are seven properties listed on the National Register in the county along with one property that has been removed. One property is a Recorded Texas Historic Landmark. The remainder belonged to a Multiple Property Submission of buildings on the campus of Prairie View A&M University.

This National Park Service list is complete through NPS recent listings posted September 11, 2026.

== Current listings ==
The locations of National Register properties may be seen in a mapping service provided.

| | Name on the Register | Image | Date listed | Location | City or town | Description |
|---|---|---|---|---|---|---|
| 1 | L.C. Anderson Hall | L.C. Anderson Hall | June 3, 1999 (#99000611) | L.W. Minor St., building #0541; 30°05′38″N 95°59′26″W | Prairie View | Prairie View A&M University MPS |
| 2 | W.R. Banks Library | W.R. Banks Library | June 3, 1999 (#99000612) | L.W. Minor St., building #0508; 30°05′36″N 95°59′21″W | Prairie View | Prairie View A&M University MPS |
| 3 | Annie Laurie Evans Hall | Annie Laurie Evans Hall | June 3, 1999 (#99000613) | L.W. Minor St., building #0544; 30°05′37″N 95°59′25″W | Prairie View | Prairie View A&M University MPS |
| 4 | Hilliard Hall | | June 3, 1999 (#99000614) | A.G. Cleaver St., building #0537; 30°05′42″N 95°58′48″W | Prairie View | Prairie View A&M University MPS |
| 5 | Liendo Plantation | Liendo Plantation | June 21, 1971 (#71000970) | 2 mi (3.2 km). NE of Hempstead off FM 1488; 30°05′47″N 96°01′47″W | Hempstead vicinity | Recorded Texas Historic Landmark |
| 6 | Veterinary Hospital | Veterinary Hospital | June 3, 1999 (#99000617) | E.M. Norris St., building #0517; 30°05′37″N 95°59′03″W | Prairie View | Prairie View A&M University MPS |
| 7 | G.R. Woolfolk Social and Political Science Building | G.R. Woolfolk Social and Political Science Building | June 3, 1999 (#99000616) | A.G. Cleaver St., building #0503; 30°05′41″N 95°59′20″W | Prairie View | Prairie View A&M University MPS |

=== Former listings ===
| | Name on the Register | Image | Date listed | Date removed | Location | City or town | Description |
|---|---|---|---|---|---|---|---|
| 1 | Foster Hall | | December 7, 1979 (#79003021) | June 3, 1999 | Prairie View A&M Campus | Prairie View | |

== See also ==
- National Register of Historic Places listings in Texas
- Recorded Texas Historic Landmarks in Waller County
