= Monaville, Texas =

Unincorporated community in Texas, US

Coordinates: 29°57′03″N 96°02′20″W

Monaville is an unincorporated community in Waller County, Texas, United States, at the intersection of FMs 359 and FM 1887. The town was named for its founder's daughter in 1886.

== History ==
The town was founded by Daniel C. Singletary, who opened a grocery store in 1886. Singletary named the settlement after his daughter Mona. The community boasted a post office from 1886 to 1913, when it closed. At this time, Monaville had a school and a cotton gin. In 1941, a total of 75 persons lived in the town. By 1987, the community had a single business and the residents engaged in agricultural pursuits, including raising cattle. Between 1990 and 2000, the population remained steady at 180.

== Geography ==
Monaville is located 7.3 miles (11.7 km) south of Pine Island on FM 359 at the intersection of FM 1887. FM 359 crosses over Harris Creek a short distance to the north. The next town to the south on FM 359 is Pattison. From Monaville, FM 1887 goes west and then north to Hempstead. FM 1887 does not continue to the east; the highway's eastern extension is Richard Frey Road. The Monaville Cemetery is located to the west at Holik and Kerr Roads.

== Education ==
Monaville is within the Hempstead Independent School District.

By 1893 the Monaville School had been established as part of the Monaville Community School District a.k.a. School District No. 13. In 1930 the Monaville Independent School District formed due to consolidations; it was dissolved by 1953.

All of Waller County is in the service area of Blinn College.
