= Madison Kilpatrick =

American political leader (1829–1910)

- Born: October 1829; Alabama, US
- Died: December 1, 1910 (aged 81); Waller County, Texas, US
- Burial place: Oakwood Cemetery, Hempstead, Texas, US
- Occupation: Political leader

Madison "Matt" Kilpatrick (October 1829 – December 1, 1910) was an American politician.

== Biography ==
Kilpatrick was born into slavery in Alabama, in October 1829. He married his wife Bettie Bradford in 1863, after he and his owner moved to Louisiana. He later moved to Austin County, Texas, eventually moving onto a 400-acre farm in Hempstead for the remainder of his life. He had 7 children with his wife, and owned a blacksmith shop.

A Republican, he served as the first treasurer of Waller County, being elected in 1873 and December 1876. He died on December 1, 1910, aged 81, in Waller County, and was buried in Oakwood Cemetery in Hempstead. A commemorative plaque was installed in Hempstead in 1973.
