= Lillie Elizabeth Drennan =

- Born: Lillie Elizabeth McGee; January 9, 1897; Galveston, Texas
- Died: September 10, 1974 (aged 77); Hempstead, Texas
- Occupation: truck driver

Lillie Elizabeth Drennan (née McGee; January 9, 1897 – September 10, 1974) was an American truck driver and businesswoman. She was the co-founder of the Drennan Truck Line, a member of the Texas Women's Press Association and the Texas Transportation Association in the United States. She is considered the first American woman to receive a truck driver's license and to operate a trucking company.

== Biography ==
She was born at John Sealy Hospital in Galveston, Texas. Her mother gave her up for adoption shortly after birth. Drennan was adopted by Francis Carolyn and Nicholse McGee. At the age of thirteen, she dropped out of school and began working as a telephone operator. A few years later, she contracted scarlet fever, which probably caused almost complete hearing loss, requiring her to use a hearing aid from the age of twenty-two. In March 1928, she and her second husband, Williard Ernest Drennan, formed a trucking company to take advantage of the nearby oil boom near Hempstead. Their business quickly grew and a second truck driver was needed, and Lillie became the driver. After their divorce in 1929, she remained the sole owner of Drennan Truck Line until 1934 and the owner of a soft drink bottling plant. After the Railroad Commission began to more closely monitor the motor transportation business, she obtained a truck driver's license in 1929. The examining board was reluctant to grant her a license, fearing that her hearing impairment might jeopardize traffic safety. She called this a gender bias, arguing, "If any man can beat my record, I'll just get out of here." Drennan Truck Line operated for nearly twenty-four years, during which she had to fend off competitors and officials who did not believe women were suited to the profession. Together with her drivers, most of whom were African-American, they transported everything from explosives to beverages throughout East Texas, over all sorts of terrain. Lillie sometimes drove for more than forty-eight hours without sleep or rest, yet she never had an accident. Joe Carrington, a well-known insurance carrier for the Texas Transportation Company, wrote in 1946 that he knew of no other truck driver with a safety record comparable to Lillie's.

She received safety awards from the Railroad Commission and the Texas Motor Transportation Association. During World War II, the United States Army recognized Lillie's success in her recruitment campaign to attract female truck drivers to the Quartermaster Corps. She also demonstrated her driving skills as a guest participant in the "Roadeo" obstacle course at the Dallas State Fairgrounds in September 1950. Throughout her long career, Lillie received media attention in magazines, newspapers, and on radio broadcasts.

In 1943, she even visited Hollywood, which was to make a film based on her life, but production never took place. On May 17, 1946, the Hempstead News dedicated a special edition to her, calling her "a twentieth-century pioneer who has all the colours of Annie Oakley and who lives the life of a tough woman on the front lines." The town of Hempstead honoured Lillie with a banquet on Six-Shooter Junction Day, May 23, 1946, attended by such notables as Texas Department head Homer Garrison, Director of the Department of Homeland Security, and future Governor Beauford Jester.

== Journalistic activity ==
Lillie wrote articles for the Hempstead News about flowers and their culture, and in 1939 she became a member of the Texas Women's Press Association. She was also a member of the Texas Transportation Association and an honorary member of the Houston Freight Carriers. She also lectured to students at Prairie View A&M University about her experiences in transportation.

She sold her company in September 1952, then operated a store on U.S. Highway 290 in Hempstead.

== Death ==
Lillie Elizabeth Drennan died on September 10, 1974, in Hempstead and was buried in the local cemetery.

== Family life ==
On December 18, 1912, at the age of fifteen, she married William Barney Jackson, had a son with him, and divorced in 1914. She was married to Willard Ernest Drennan from July 17, 1917, to June 1929. Her last marriage, to S. B. Boulawar, lasted from 1931 to 1943.
