= Edmund Montgomery =

Scottish–American physician and philosopher

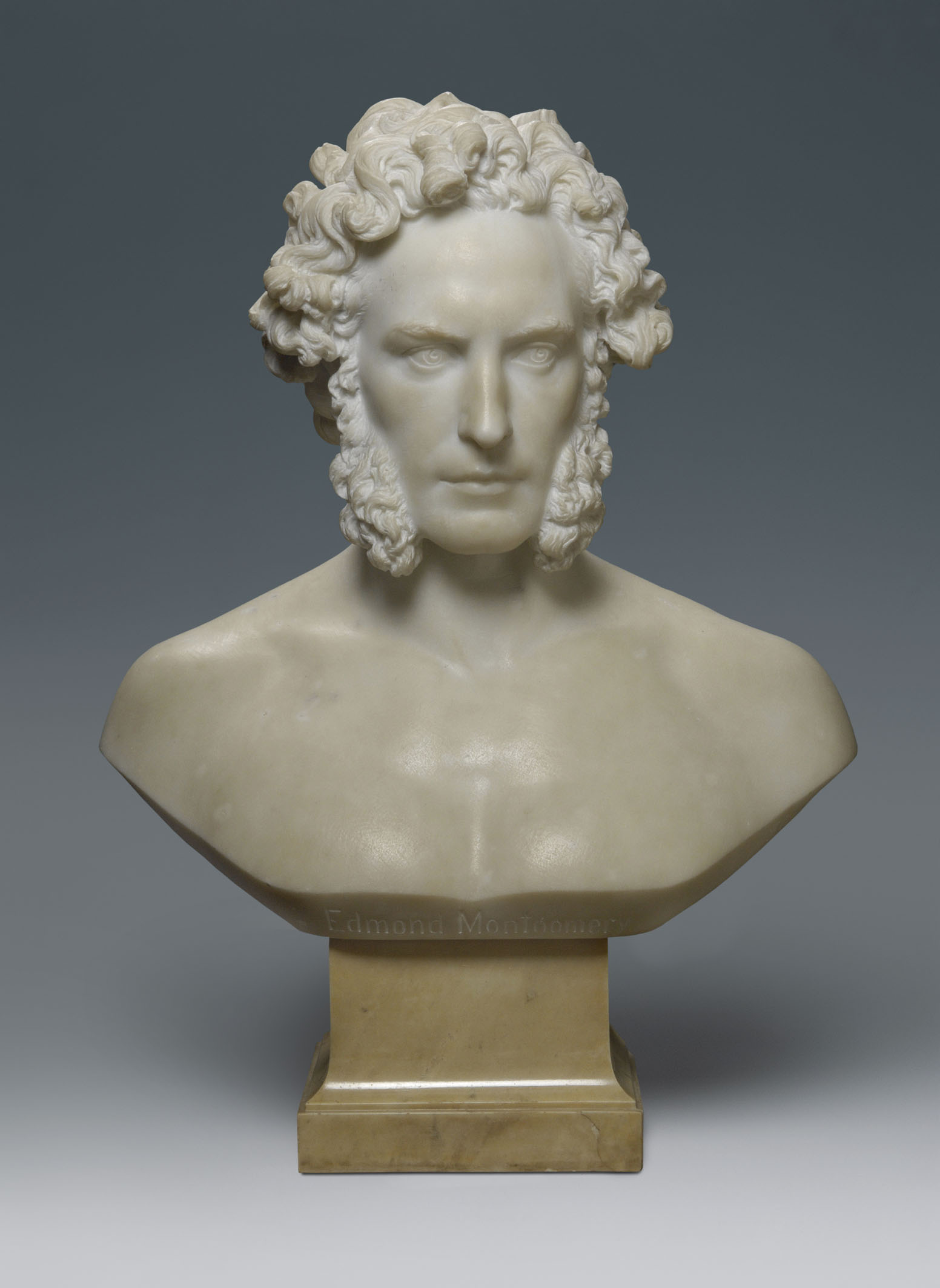
- Edmund Montgomery 1864 bust by Elisabet Ney
- Born: March 19, 1835; Edinburgh, Scotland
- Died: April 17, 1911 (aged 76); Hempstead, Texas, U.S.
- Citizenship: Scottish-American
- Education: University of Heidelberg (1852–1855); University of Berlin (1855–1856); University of Bonn (1856–1857); University of Würzburg (1857–1858)
- Spouse: Elisabet Ney
- Children: Arthur Montgomery, Lorne Ney Montgomery

Edmund Duncan Montgomery (March 19, 1835 – April 17, 1911) was a Scottish-American philosopher, scientist and physician. He was the husband of German-American sculptor Elisabet Ney.

== Early life ==
Montgomery was born on 19 March 1835, in Edinburgh, Scotland. His parentage is unknown, but the Elisabet Ney Museum relates the possibility that he was the son of Isabella Davidson (or Montgomery) and a prominent Scottish jurist, Duncan McNeill, 1st Baron Colonsay. He and his mother lived in Paris and Frankfurt, supplemented by a trust fund for him.

By the time he entered his teens, he began to be interested in the philosophical works of Arthur Schopenhauer. While still living in Frankfurt and only 13 years old, he participated in the Revolutions of 1848 in the German states.

== Education ==
In 1852, Montgomery studied medicine at the University of Heidelberg, where he did lab work under Robert Bunsen and came under the influence of Christian Kapp, Ludwig Andreas Feuerbach and Jacob Moleschott. He later attended lectures by Johannes Peter Müller at the University of Berlin during his 1855–1856 enrollment. While studying in Bonn 1856–1857, he attended influential lectures of Hermann von Helmholtz.

== Medical practice ==
Montgomery received his MD degree from the University of Würzburg on February 18, 1858.

Montgomery interned at Prague and Vienna. He served his residency at the German Hospital, Dalston (London) and Bermondsay Dispensary. While doing biological research, he became Curator of the St Thomas' Hospital and Demonstrator of Morbid Anatomy. He was elected to the Royal College of Physicians of London in 1862.

After being diagnosed with tuberculosis in 1863, Montgomery left the Royal College of Physicians of London and established medical practices on the resort island of Madeira (1863–1865), in Menton (1866) on the French Riviera, and also in Rome (1867) and Munich (1868), while continuing to do his research. A life annuity allowed him to retire from medical practice in 1869, and devote the rest of his life to philosophy, scientific research, and writing.

== Medicine ==
Montgomery's work in medicine included the study of cell theory.

== Philosophy ==
Montgomery's study of philosophy complemented his work as a physical scientist. He saw life as the ability of certain chemical compounds to resist damage. He commented on conceptions of knowledge and self in over sixty journal articles and five books. He was an advocate of humanitarianism and a "religion of life," focusing on the idea that man must not ignore the potential of his own yet-to-be-completed evolutionary process.

The two most significant papers written by Montgomery were his Refutation of Kant From the Standpoint of the Empirical (1870) and The Revelation of Present Experience (1910).

In the former, Montgomery convincingly refutes Immanuel Kant's a priori, the lynchpin of Kant's system, and in the latter, he insists that all knowledge (no exceptions) is based on the evidence provided by the senses.

Montgomery was an advocate of non-Darwinian evolution and organicism. He was also cited as a defender of vitalism. He authored The Vitality and Organization of Protoplasm (1904) and Philosophical Problems in the Light of Vital Organization. He has been described as a pioneer of organicism.

== Personal life ==
While a student at the University of Heidelberg in 1853, Montgomery began a courtship with sculptor Elisabet Ney, who was visiting friends in the city. They were married at the British consulate in Madeira on November 7, 1863.

Montgomery was diagnosed with tuberculosis in 1863. By 1870, the Franco-Prussian War had begun. In the autumn of that year, Ney became pregnant with their first child. Montgomery received a letter from his friend, Baron Carl Vicco Otto Friedrich Constantin von Stralendorff of Mecklenburg-Schwerin, who had moved to Thomasville, Georgia, with his new wife, Margaret Elizabeth Russell of Boston, Massachusetts, declaring the location "Earth's paradise." On January 14, 1871, Ney and Montgomery, accompanied by their housekeeper, Cenci, emigrated to Georgia, to a colony promoted as a resort for consumptives. Their first son, Arthur (1871–1873) was born there, and second son, Lorne (1872–1913), was born in Red Wing, Minnesota, during one of their travels. Baron and Baroness von Stralendorff returned to Wismar, Germany, where he died on July 1, 1872.

In 1873, Ney traveled alone to Texas. With the help of German Consul Julius Runge in Galveston, Ney was shown Liendo Plantation near Hempstead in Waller County. On March 4, 1873, Montgomery and the rest of the family arrived, and he purchased it. While he tended to his research, Ney ran it for the next twenty years. Their son, Arthur, died of diphtheria in 1873.

Montgomery was involved in an advisory capacity in the founding of Prairie View A&M, originally called Prairie View Normal School.

Montgomery became a naturalized United States citizen, and thereafter became active in local politics and events. He served two terms as Waller County Road Commissioner and oversaw the building of an iron bridge across the Brazos River. In 1903, he was elected president of the Texas Academy of Science.

== Death ==
Montgomery died on April 17, 1911, after suffering a number of strokes and is buried next to Ney at Liendo.

== Published works and/or papers housed at Southern Methodist University ==
- An Address to the People… (date unknown)
- The Corngrowers of Tomorrow (date unknown)
- The Epistemological Task (date unknown)
- Fichte (date unknown)
- The Groundwork of Ethics (date unknown)
- Ethics (date unknown)
- Concerning Psycho-Parallelism (date unknown)
- Stereometrie (1851)
- On the Formation of the So-Called Cells in Animal Bodies (1867)
- Die Kant’sche Erkenntniss Lehre Widerlegt Vom Standpunkt Der Empirie (Munchen: Verlag con C. Ackermann) (1870)
- Die Kant’sche Erkenntnisslehre widerlegt vom Standpunkt der Empirie (1871)
- The Elementary Functions and the Primitive Organization of Protoplasm (St. Thomas’s Hospital Reports IX) (1879)
- The Dependence of Quality of Specific Energies (Mind, Vol. V) (1880)
- The Unity of Organic Individual (Mind) (1880)
- Zur Lehre von der Muskelcontraktion (Pfluger’s Archive fur Physiologie) (1881)
- The Substantiality of Life (Mind) (1881)
- Are We Cell Aggregates? (Mind') (1882)
- Causation and Its Organic Condition (Mind, Vol. VI ) (1882)
- Hunger (The Index) (December 25, 1884)
- The Object of Knowledge (Mind) (1885)
- Transcendentalism and Evolution (The Index) (March 26, 1885)
- Space and Touch (Mind) (1885)
- Our Personality (The Index) (April 2, 1885)
- Uber das Protoplasma Einiger Elemeentarorganismen (Jenaishe Zeitschrift fur Naturwissenschaft) (1885)
- Mental Activity (Mind) (1889)
- True Democracy (New Occasions) (June, 1893)
- The Psychological Significance of Dreams (Religio-Philosophical Journal) (September 30, 1893)
- To be Alive, What is it? (Monist) (1895)
- The Integration of Mind (Mind) (1895)
- Are We Conscious Automata? (Proceedings of the Texas Academy of Science) (1897)
- Molecular Theories of Organic Reproduction (Proceedings of the Texas Academy of Science) (1897)
- The Vitality and Organization of Protoplasm (Austin, Texas: Gammel-Statesman Publishing Company) (1904)
- 'Neovitalism (Proceedings of the Texas Academy of Science) (1904)
- Anent Psychophysical Parallelism, (American Journal of Psychology) (April, 1905)
- Philosophical Problems in the Light of Vital Organization (1907)
- The Revelation of Present Experience (1908)
- The Revolution of Present Experience (Boston: Sherman, French & Company) (1910)
- Letters to Religio-Philosophical Journal, The Open Court; The New Ideal; The Conservator; and the Hempstead News, (1887–1911)

== Additional sources ==
- Montgomery, Edmund (1910). The Revelation Of Present Experience. Kessinger Publishing, LLC. ISBN 978-1-161-83981-4.
- Loggins, Vernon (1946). Two romantics and their ideal life;: Elisabet Ney, sculptor; Edmund Montgomery, philosopher. The Odyssey Press.
- Keeton, Morris T (1950). The Philosophy of Edmund Montgomery. University Press in Dallas.
- Stephens, Ida Kendrick (1951). The Hermit Philosopher of Liendo. Southern Methodist University Press.
- Montgomery, Edmund (2010). The Vitality and Organization of Protoplasm (Reprint ed.). General Books LLC. ISBN 978-1-154-88565-1.
- Montgomery, Edmund (2010). Philosophical Problems in the Light of Vital Organization (Reprint ed.). Nabu Press. ISBN 978-1-146-06222-0.
