= Jordan Holland =

American football player (born 1995)

Profile
- Position: Cornerback

Personal information
- Born: March 15, 1995 (age 31); Missouri City, Texas
- Listed height: 5 ft 10 in (1.78 m)
- Listed weight: 190 lb (86 kg)

Career information
- High school: Missouri City (TX) Elkins
- College: Prairie View A&M
- NFL draft: 2016: undrafted

Career history
- Billings Wolves (2016); Cleveland Gladiators (2017); Edmonton Eskimos (2018); San Antonio Commanders (2019)*; San Francisco 49ers (2019)*
- * Offseason or practice squad member only

Jordan Rashad Holland (born March 15, 1995) is an American former professional football cornerback. He is the son of outside linebackers coach and run game specialist Johnny Holland for the San Francisco 49ers. He played college football at Prairie View A&M University in Texas and attended Elkins High School in Missouri City, Texas. He was a member of the Billings Wolves, Cleveland Gladiators, Edmonton Eskimos, San Antonio Commanders, and San Francisco 49ers.

== Professional career ==
On August 26, 2019, Holland signed with the San Francisco 49ers. He was waived during final roster cuts on August 30, 2019.
