= Hempstead High School (Texas) =

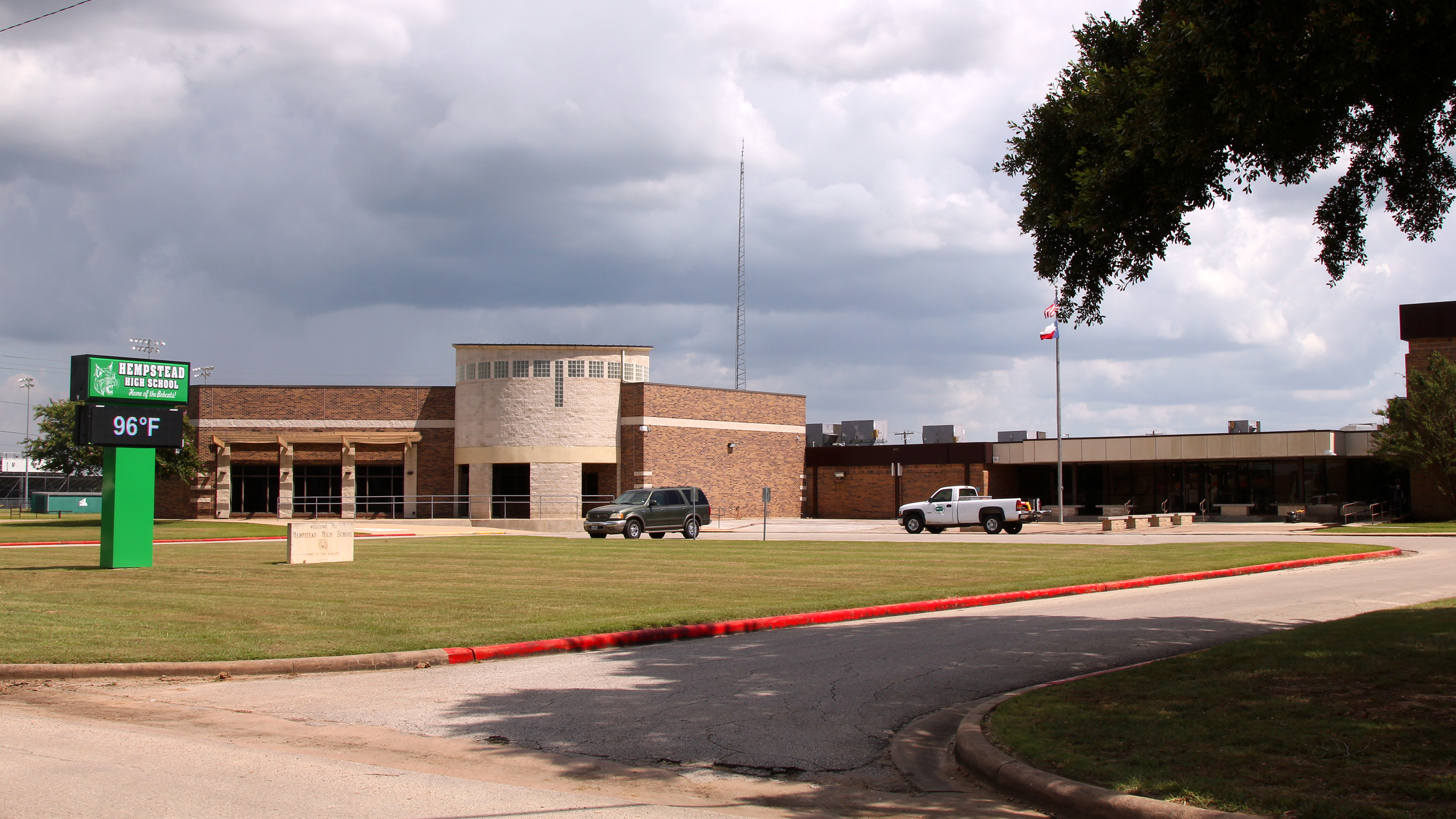

Location
- 801 Donaho St. Hempstead, Texas 77445-1007; United States; 30.0834°N 96.0768°W

Information
- School type: Public high school
- School district: Hempstead Independent School District
- Principal: LAKESHA MORGAN
- Teaching staff: 37.75 (FTE)
- Grades: 9-12
- Enrollment: 447 (2023–2024)
- Student to teacher ratio: 11.84
- Colors: Kelly Green & White
- Athletics conference: UIL Class 3A
- Mascot: Bobcat
- Website: Hempstead High School

Hempstead High School is a public high school located in the city of Hempstead, Texas, United States and classified as a 3A school by the UIL. It is a part of the Hempstead Independent School District located in northwestern Waller County. In 2015, the school was rated "Improvement Required" by the Texas Education Agency.

== Athletics ==
The Hempstead Bobcats compete in these sports -

Football, Baseball, Softball, Volleyball, Cross Country, Soccer, Basketball, Powerlifting, Golf & Track.

=== State Finalist ===
- Football
  - 2011(2A/D1)

In March 2012, Head football and track coach Ricky Sargent came under fire for allowing students to be left behind at a restaurant in Giddings Texas after a track meet. According to reports, two seniors exited their bus after being told not to. Coach Sargent was notified and OKed the bus to depart without the two students. Sargent would later that night drive to Giddings to stay with the students until parents could arrive. He later met with the parents and apologized for the incident. After hearing of the situation, officials with the Hempstead Independent School District called a special meeting for April 9, 2012 whereby Coach Sargent was fired and the four coaches on the bus were given a 30 day suspension without pay. One week later, the school board reversed their decision and reinstated Coach Sargent and the other coaches.

== Theater ==
- One Act Play
  - 2012(2A)
