= Hempstead Independent School District =

School district in Texas, United States

Address
- 1440 13th Street Hempstead, Texas, 77445; United States

District information
- Type: Public
- Grades: PK–12
- Schools: 3
- NCES District ID: 4822920

Students and staff
- Students: 1,582 (2023–2024)
- Teachers: 107.66 (on an FTE basis) (2023–2024)
- Staff: 150.56 (on an FTE basis) (2023–2024)
- Student–teacher ratio: 14.69 (2023–2024)

Other information
- Website: www.hempsteadisd.org

Hempstead Independent School District is a public school district based in Hempstead, Texas, United States. The school district has three schools and an early childhood learning center.

The district serves Hempstead and unincorporated areas in Waller County, including Monaville. Despite a small school population, the district covers a large rural area.

In 2009, the school district was rated "academically acceptable" by the Texas Education Agency.

In the 2015-2016 school year, the school district had a very close call with being closed, and possibly integrated with neighboring Waller ISD or Navasota ISD, but the district has since recovered.

== Schools ==
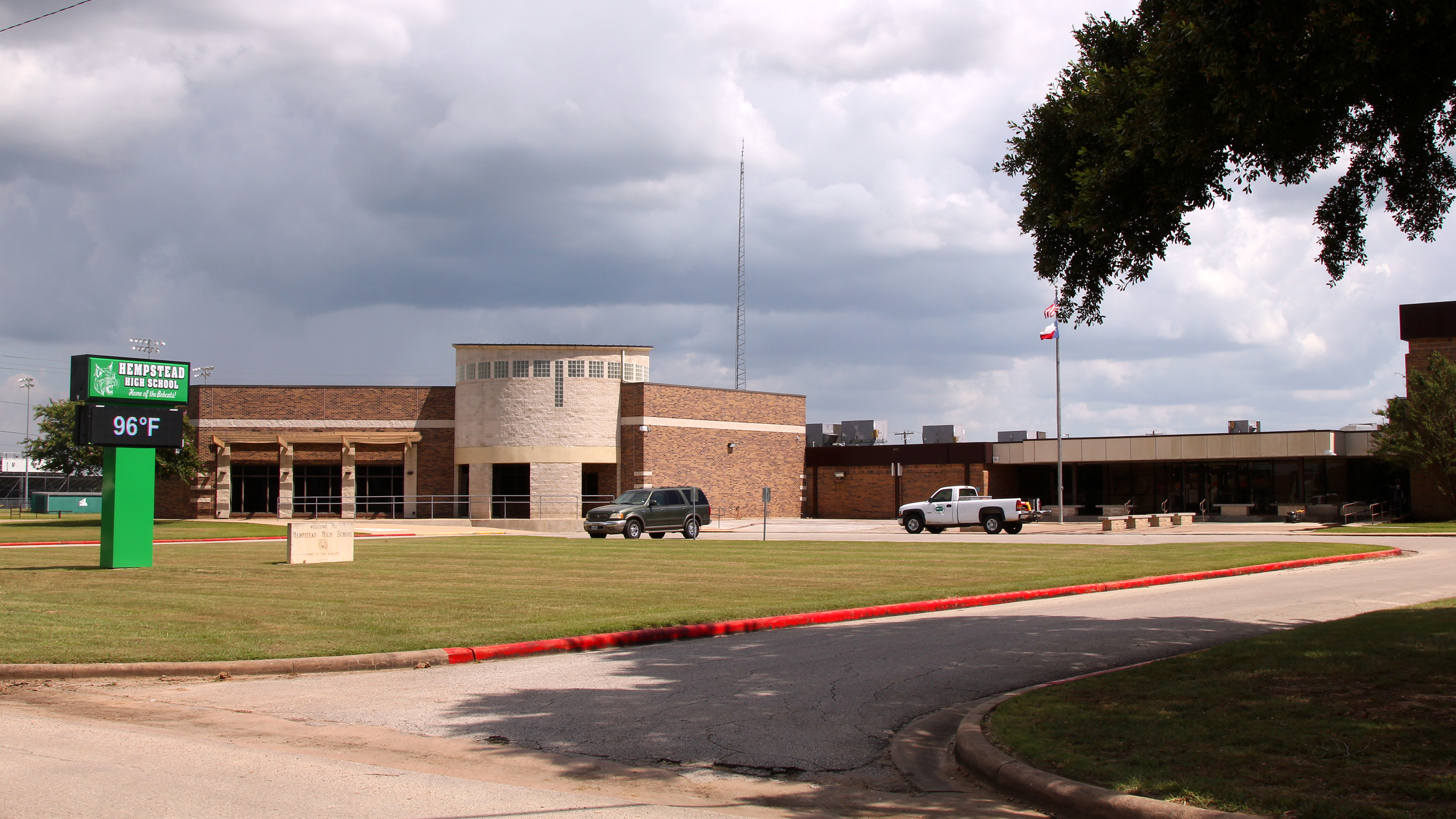
Hempstead High School

- Hempstead High (grades 9-12)
- Hempstead Middle (grades 6-8)
- Hempstead Elementary (kindergarten-grade 5)
- Hempstead Early Childhood Center (prekindergarten ages 3-4)

As of 2014, 360 students attended Hempstead Middle School, 54% of them being Hispanic.
