= Hempstead, Texas =

Hempstead
- City
- City of Hempstead, Texas
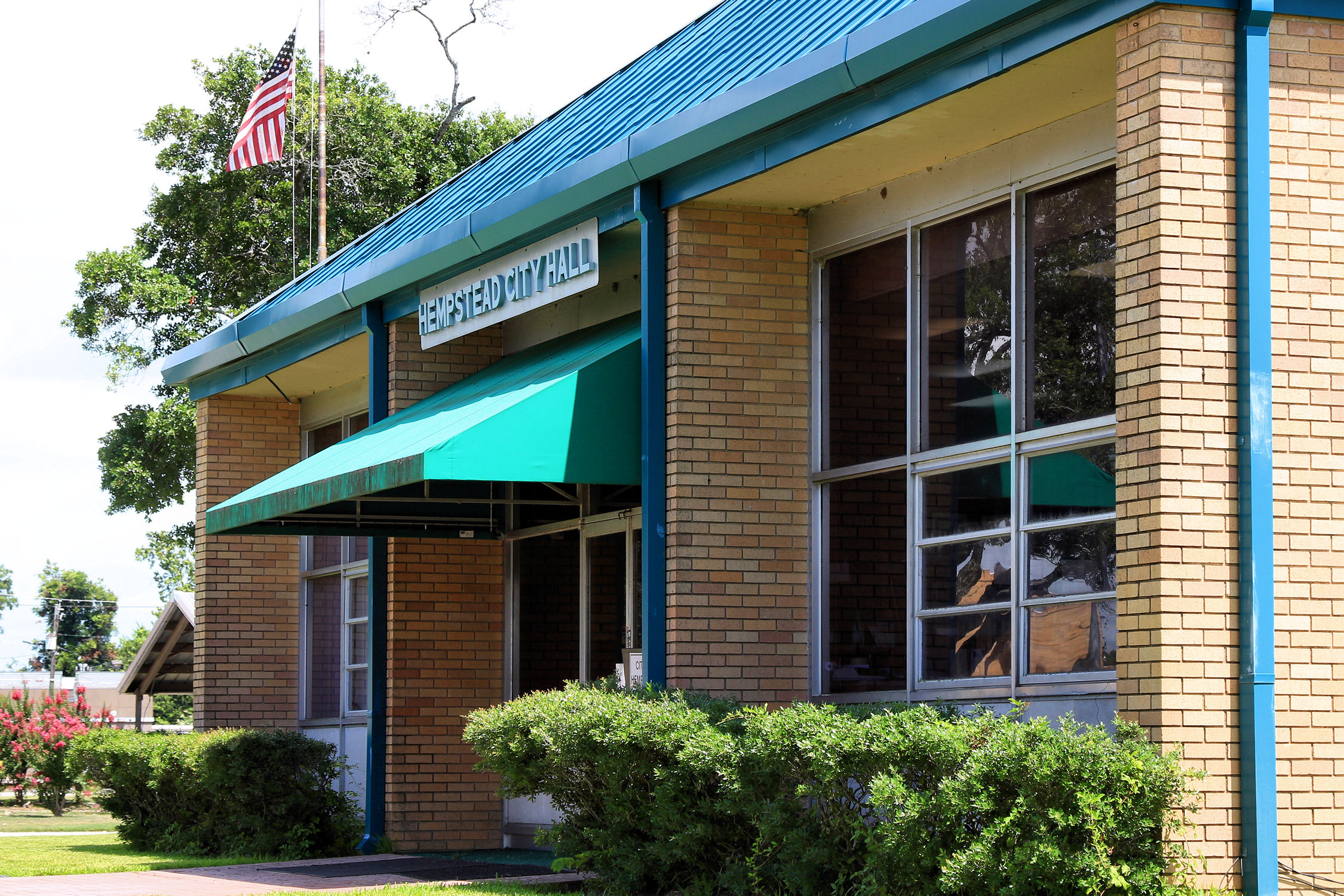
- Hempstead City Hall
- Nickname: Watermelon Capital of Texas
- Location in the state of Texas
- Coordinates: 30°5′29″N 96°4′53″W
- Country: United States
- State: Texas
- County: Waller
- Incorporated: Originally incorporated November 10, 1858, re-incorporated June 10, 1935

Government
  - Mayor: Katherine Ward

Area
  - Total: 6.56 sq mi (16.99 km^{2})
  - Land: 6.55 sq mi (16.97 km^{2})
  - Water: 0.012 sq mi (0.03 km^{2})
- Elevation: 227 ft (69.1 m)

Population (2020)
  - Total: 5,430
  - Density: 1,275.4/sq mi (492.42/km^{2})
- Time zone: UTC-6 (CST)
  - Summer (DST): UTC-5 (CDT)
- ZIP code: 77445
- Area code: 979
- FIPS code: 48-33200
- GNIS feature ID: 1337592
- Website: www.hempsteadcitytx.gov

Hempstead is a city in and the county seat of Waller County, Texas, United States. As of the 2020 census, Hempstead had a population of 5,430. It is part of the Houston–Pasadena–The Woodlands metropolitan area.

== History ==
On December 29, 1856, Richard Rodgers Peebles and James W. McDade organized the Hempstead Town Company to sell lots in the newly established community of Hempstead, which was located at the projected terminus of Houston and Texas Central Railway. Peebles named Hempstead after Dr. G. S. B. Hempstead, Peebles's brother-in-law. Peebles and Mary Ann Groce Peebles, his wife, contributed 2,000 acres (8.1 km^{2}) of the estate of Jared E. Groce, Jr., for the community. On June 29, 1858, the Houston and Texas Central Railway was extended to Hempstead, causing the community to become a distribution center between the Gulf Coast and the interior of Texas. On November 10 of that year, Hempstead incorporated. The Washington County Railroad, which ran from Hempstead to Brenham, enhanced the city upon its completion.

=== American Civil War and aftermath ===
==== 1861–1862 ====
The Confederate Military Post of Hempstead was established in the spring of 1861. Numerous camps of instruction were established east of town along Clear Creek. Camp Hebert was established on the eastern bank of Clear Creek and south of Washington Road. Camp Hebert was the earliest camp in the area, and served as the headquarters of the Post of Hempstead early in the war.

Camp Groce CSA was established in the spring of 1862 nearby on Liendo Plantation on the eastern bank of Clear Creek as a camp of instruction for Confederate infantry recruits. Originally named Camp Liendo, the name was changed to Camp Groce in honor of Leonard Waller Groce, the owner of Liendo Plantation, and the owner of over 100 slaves. A contract to construct the barracks at Camps Groce and Hebert was let in February 1862. Numerous Confederate infantry regiments were organized, trained, and equipped at Camps Groce and Hebert. In the spring of 1862, the camps were abandoned due to their sickness-inducing locations. Camp Groce was reused as a military camp until spring 1863, but was again abandoned. From 1861 to 1863, nearly 200 Confederate soldiers fell sick at Camps Groce and Hebert and died. Many were taken to the Post Hospital in the Planter's Exchange Hotel located at the southwest corner of 12th and Wilkins Streets in downtown Hempstead. Many died in the hospital and almost all of them are buried on McDade Plantation west of town, which became the hospital cemetery.

==== 1863 ====
In June 1863, Camp Groce was reopened as a prison camp for Union prisoners captured in the Battles of Galveston (January 1, 1863) and Sabine Pass I (January 21, 1863). The Union prisoners of war taken at the Battle of Sabine Pass II (September 8, 1863) were also sent to Camp Groce; 427 Union prisoners were held at Camp Groce in 1863 and 21 died. Most of the dead were buried northeast of camp where most of them still rest today.

==== 1873 ====
German-American sculptor Elisabet Ney and her husband, Scottish physician and philosopher Edmund Montgomery, purchased the Liendo plantation where their family and they split time between there and their home in Austin for the next 20 years. Ney died and was buried at Liendo.

=== 20th century to present ===
Hempstead is famous for its watermelon crop, and until the 1940s, the town was the top shipper of watermelons in the United States. Billy DiIorio was known as the Watermelon King and Angelina DiIorio was known as the Watermelon Queen. Both resided in Hempstead. The town holds an annual Watermelon Festival in July.

Hempstead is also known for its early 20th-century rough-and-tumble character. The town was informally called Six Shooter Junction.

The town has grown in recent years because of its relative closeness to Houston along U.S. Highway 290. The current economy is based on county government, shipping, and a small but growing industrial base. The town has rebounded in its population since 2010.

One of the town's residents was Lillie E. Drennan, who in 1929 became the first woman to hold a commercial driver's license in Texas. She ran a regional hauling company called the Drennan Truck Line while maintaining an excellent driving record. Drennan received periodic attention in national newspapers and radio broadcasts.

== Geography ==
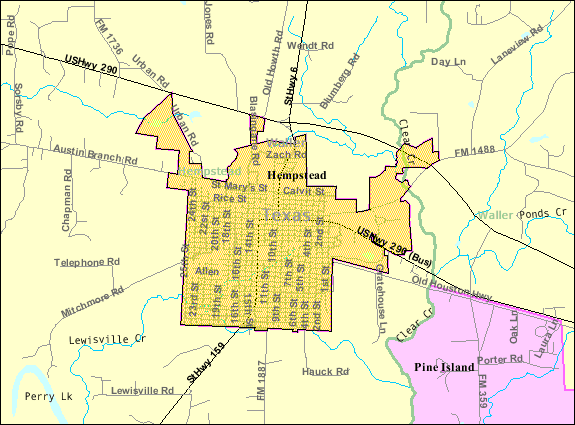
Map of Hempstead

Hempstead is located at 30°5′29″N 96°4′53″W (30.091427, –96.081252). According to the United States Census Bureau, the city has a total area of 5.0 square miles (12.9 km^{2}), of which 0.04 square mile (0.1 km^{2}) (0.40%) is covered by water.

== Location ==
The community, located at the junctions of U.S. Highway 290, Texas State Highway 6, and Texas State Highway 159, is about 50 miles northwest of downtown Houston. The population was 5,770 at the 2010 census.

== Highways ==
- US 290
- SH 6
- SH 159
- FM 1488

== Demographics ==
Historical population
Census	Pop.	Note	%±
1880	1,612		—
1890	1,671		3.7%
1940	1,674		—
1950	1,395		−16.7%
1960	1,505		7.9%
1970	1,891		25.6%
1980	3,456		82.8%
1990	3,551		2.7%
2000	4,691		32.1%
2010	5,770		23.0%
2020	5,430		−5.9%
U.S. Decennial Census

=== 2020 census ===
As of the 2020 census, there were 5,430 people, 1,946 households, and 1,734 families residing in the city. The median age was 32.6 years; 28.3% of residents were under 18 and 12.7% were 65 or older. For every 100 females, there were 93.4 males, and for every 100 females 18 and over, there were 89.9 males 18 and over.

About 90.1% of residents lived in urban areas, while 9.9% lived in rural areas.

Of the 1,946 households in Hempstead, 38.2% had children under 18 living in them, 39.7% were married-couple households, 20.6% were households with a male householder and no spouse or partner present, and 34.6% were households with a female householder and no spouse or partner present. About 26.6% of all households were made up of individuals, and 11.5% had someone living alone who was 65 years of age or older.

The city had 2,294 housing units, of which 15.2% were vacant. The homeowner vacancy rate was 3.2% and the rental vacancy rate was 15.4%.

Racial composition as of the 2020 census
Race	Number	Percentage
White	1,520	28.0%
Black or African American	1,790	33.0%
American Indian and Alaska Native	55	1.0%
Asian	35	0.6%
Native Hawaiian and other Pacific Islander	6	0.1%
Some other race	1,289	23.7%
Two or more races	735	13.5%
Hispanic or Latino (of any race)	2,375	43.7%

=== 2010 census ===
As of the 2010 census, 5,770 people, 2,010 households, and 1,360 families resided in the city. The population density was 1,040.8 inhabitants per square mile (401.9/km^{2}). The 2,220 housing units averaged 400.7 per square mile (154.7/km^{2}). The racial makeup of the city was 36.8% White (including 22.5% non-Hispanic/Latino), 38.9% African American, 1.4% Native American, 0.6% Asian, 0.1% Pacific Islander, 20.2% from other races, and 2.2% from two or more races. Hispanics or Latinos of any race were 37.4% of the population.

Of the 2,010 households, 36.4% had children under 18 living with them, 37.7% were married couples living together, 22.8% had a female householder with no husband present, and 32.3% were not families. About 25.5% of all households were made up of individuals, and 9.2% had someone living alone who was 65 or older. The average household size was 2.81, and the average family size was 3.42.

In the city, the population was distributed as 30.6% under 18, 14.7% from 18 to 24, 25.3% from 25 to 44, 20.1% from 45 to 64, and 9.3% who were 65 or older. The median age was 27.9 years. For every 100 females, there were 95 males. For every 100 females 18 and over, there were 90.4 males.

The median income in the city for a household was $35,859. In 2008–2012, the per capita income for the city was $15,888. About 25.4% of the population was below the poverty line.

== Economy ==
Until February 2009, the Lawrence Marshall car dealership was Hempstead's largest employer. The sudden closure of the dealership led the city to reconsider capital projects such as sewer upgrades and city park upgrades.

== Government and infrastructure ==
Hempstead is the county seat of Waller County. The United States Postal Service Hempstead Post Office is located at 901 12th Street.

The Hempstead Police Department was established in 1981, replacing the town marshal. It has 19 full-time and five reserve officers. In early 2007, the department's head, R. Glenn Smith, was given a two-week, unpaid suspension and six months' probation because of allegations that four officers and he, all white, had exhibited racism and police brutality during the arrest of a 35-year-old black man. In March 2008, he was fired by the town council. He then ran for and was elected sheriff of Waller County.

In February 2009, the mayor pro tem and an alderman resigned as a result of an investigation into bribery and kickbacks in awarding contracts.

== Education ==
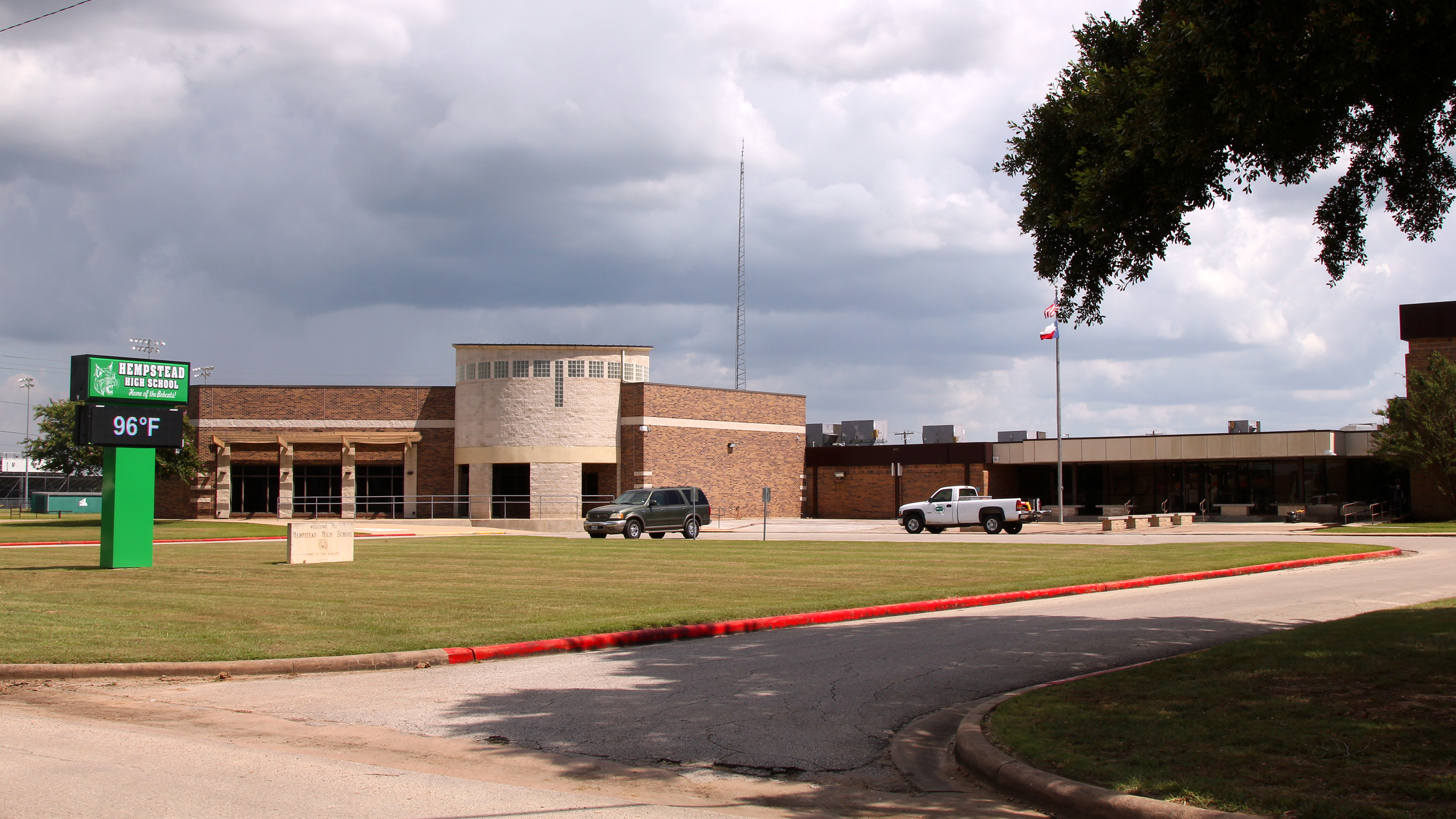
Hempstead High School

The City of Hempstead is served by the Hempstead Independent School District. Hempstead High School is the public high school.

All of Waller County is in the service area of Blinn College.

The Waller County Library System operates the Hempstead Library.

The one private Christian school in Hempstead is the Community Christian Academy. The grades of study offered are kindergarten through fifth grade.

== Climate ==
The climate in this area is characterized by hot, humid summers and generally mild to cool winters. According to the Köppen climate classification, Hempstead has a humid subtropical climate, Cfa on climate maps.

== Notable people ==
- Cynthia Bond (born 1961), author and actress
- Kevin Carroll (born 1969), American football player
- Norris Wright Cuney (1846–1898), politician
- Lillie Elizabeth Drennan (1897–1974), truck driver
- Alfred C. Finn (1883–1964), architect
- Pamelya Herndon (born 1952), attorney, accountant and politician
- Johnny Holland (born 1965), American player and coach
- Madison Kilpatrick (1829–1910), politician
- Edmund Montgomery (1835–1911), physician and philosopher
- Pat Newnam (1880–1938), baseball player
- Buster Pickens (1916–1964), pianist
- Terrence Toliver (born 1988), American football player
- Harvey Williams (born 1967), American football player

== Gallery ==
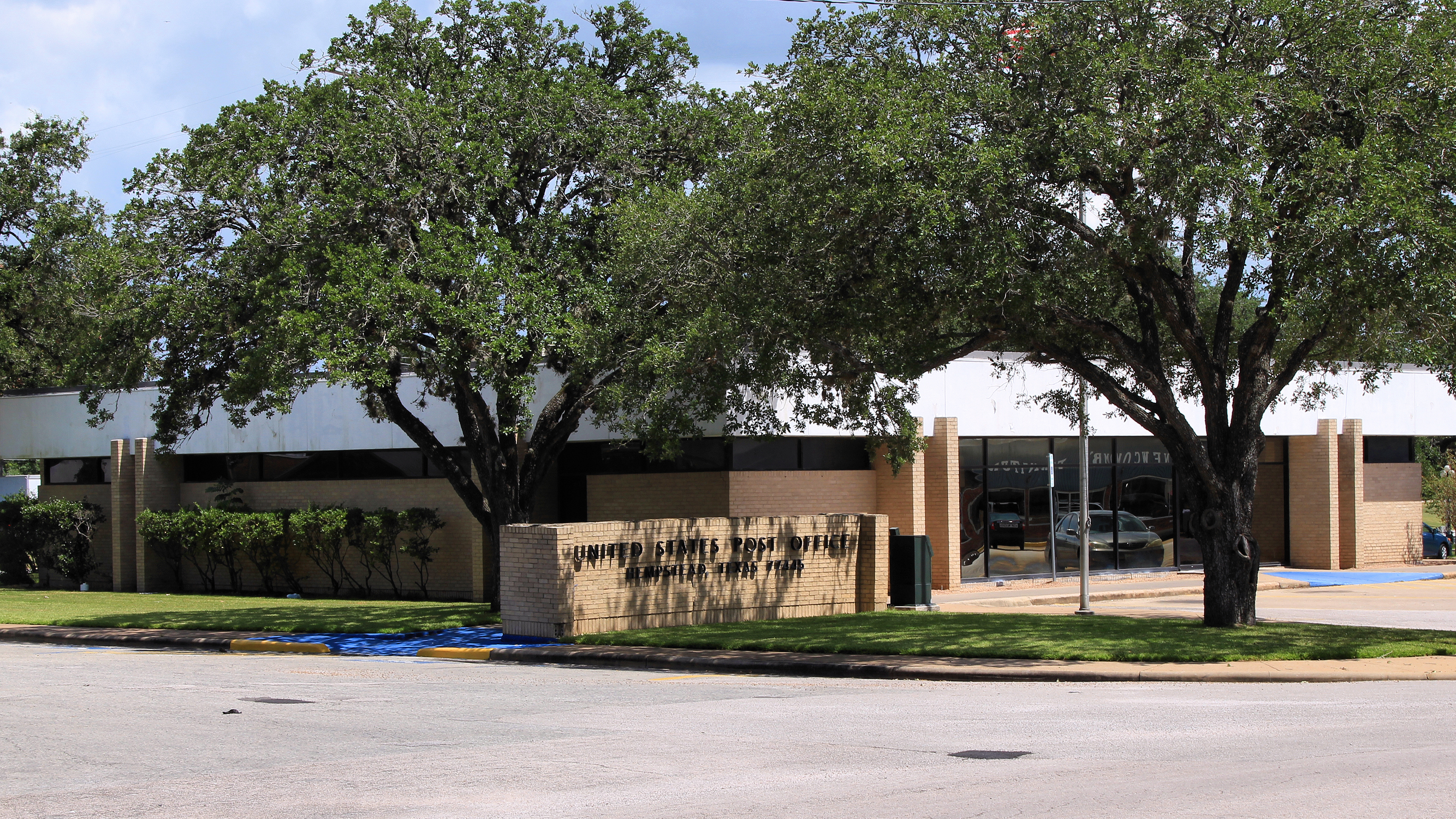
Post Office

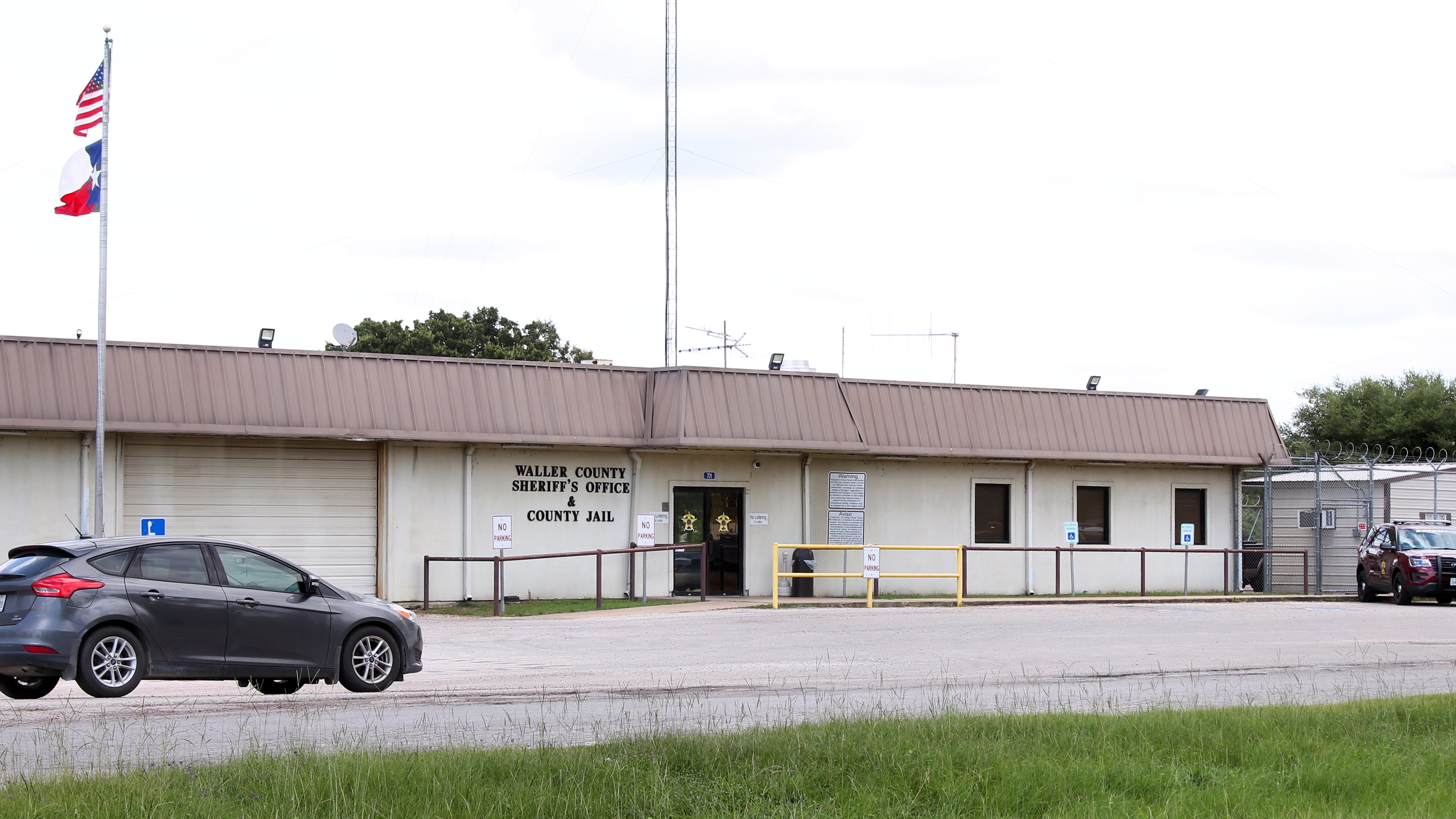
Walker County Sheriff's Office and County Jail
